= Impeachment in the Philippines =

Process of accusing a high-ranking official

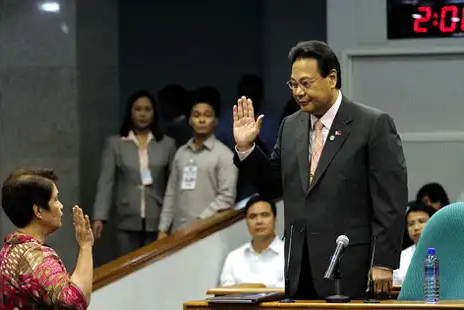
Chief Justice Renato Corona takes the witness stand during his 2012 impeachment trial. He was later convicted and dismissed, marking the only completed impeachment of a Philippine official to date.

In the Philippines, impeachment is a power granted by the Constitution, allowing Congress to formally charge a high-ranking government official with an impeachable offense, which refers to serious misconduct that may warrant removal from office. Officials subject to impeachment include the president, the vice president, justices of the Supreme Court, members of the constitutional commissions, and the ombudsman. Grounds for impeachment include culpable violation of the Constitution, treason, bribery, graft and corruption, betrayal of public trust, and other high crimes.

Although "impeachment" is commonly used to describe the entire process of removing an official, it formally refers to the indictment stage, the initial phase in which formal charges are brought. The House of Representatives has the exclusive power to initiate impeachment cases. An official is considered impeached when at least one-third of all House members vote in favor of the articles of impeachment, the formal document detailing the charges. However, because the legislative agenda is controlled by a simple majority, it may be procedurally difficult for a minority bloc of lawmakers to bring such charges to a floor vote.

Following impeachment by the House, the Senate convenes as an impeachment court to try the official and determine guilt. If convicted by a two-thirds majority vote, the official is removed from office and may be permanently disqualified from holding future government positions.

Some civil society organizations emphasize that impeachment proceedings uphold democratic values and serve as a safeguard for accountability and governance.

== Scope of impeachment ==
=== Impeachable officials ===
An impeachable official is a high-ranking public officer who can only be removed from their position through the impeachment process. Under Article XI, Section 2 of the 1987 Constitution, this exclusive list is strictly limited to the following:

- The president
- The vice president
- Members of the Supreme Court (the chief justice and associate justices)
- Members of the constitutional commissions (the Civil Service Commission, Commission on Elections, and Commission on Audit)
- The ombudsman

This list is exclusive and cannot be modified by legislation. Public officers and employees who are not on this list cannot be impeached. Instead, they are subject to removal from office through regular legal and administrative procedures.

The roster of impeachable officials has varied in previous constitutions. Under the 1935 Constitution established during the Commonwealth period, impeachable officials included the president, the vice president, members of the Supreme Court, and the auditor general. Under the 1973 Constitution promulgated during the martial law era, the list was limited to the president, members of the Supreme Court, and members of the constitutional commissions.

=== Impeachable offenses ===
Under Article XI, Section 2 of the Constitution, an impeachable official may be removed from office on any of the following exclusive grounds:

- Culpable violation of the Constitution
A serious overstep or blatant ignorance of the Constitution. It must be "culpable," meaning the act is of a character that is inherently "worthy of punishment." It excludes violations that were made unintentionally, mistakenly, or in good faith.
- Treason
Betraying the country, especially by providing aid to an enemy during war. The Revised Penal Code defines it as a crime committed by "any Filipino citizen who levies war against the Philippines or adheres to her enemies, giving them aid or comfort within the Philippines or elsewhere."
- Bribery
Providing or accepting anything valuable intended to influence the actions of a public official. The Revised Penal Code defines two forms. Direct bribery is committed by "any public officer who shall agree to perform an act constituting a crime, in connection with the performance of his official duties, in consideration of any offer, promise, gift or present received by such officer, personally or through the mediation of another." Meanwhile, indirect bribery is committed by "any public officer who shall accept gifts offered to him by reason of his office."
- Graft and corruption
The exploitation of a government position or official authority for personal gain. A violation of the Anti-Graft and Corrupt Practices Act (Republic Act No. 3019), such as when a public official acquires money or property that significantly exceeds their legal income, regardless of whose name the assets are registered under.
- Other high crimes
Any serious illegal actions that harm the country, or the survival or operations of government. In American jurisprudence, high crimes are acts serious enough to suggest a "grave violation of the trust imposed" on the impeachable official, whether or not the act is a chargeable crime.
- Betrayal of public trust
A broad concept covering actions that undermine the integrity of public office. It empowers Congress to remove unfit officials for misconduct outside strict legal definitions. Legal author Hector de Leon notes this includes non-punishable violations of the oath of office that cost popular support. The 1986 Constitutional Commission intended the term to cover acts bringing the office into disrepute, such as betraying the public interest, inexcusable negligence, tyrannical abuse of power, malfeasance or misfeasance, cronyism, and favoritism.

Because impeachment is fundamentally a political process rather than a strictly legal proceeding, the exact definitions and scope of these offenses are determined or interpreted by the elected members of the Congress, rather than trained judges. While some of these grounds are statutory crimes—offenses formally defined in existing laws, such as the Revised Penal Code and the Anti-Graft and Corrupt Practices Act—Congress is not strictly bound by their technical legal definitions during an impeachment trial.

In its 2003 ruling in Francisco Jr. v. House of Representatives, the Supreme Court explicitly refused to define "other high crimes" and "betrayal of public trust." The court ruled that defining these terms is a "non-justiciable political question," which it defined as an issue "to be decided by the people in their sovereign capacity, or in regard to which full discretionary authority has been delegated to the Legislature or executive branch of the Government."

With the exception of "betrayal of public trust," the Constitution characterizes all other grounds for impeachment as high crimes, which influences the standard of proof required during a trial. The roster of impeachable offenses has expanded through successive constitutions. The original four grounds—culpable violation of the Constitution, treason, bribery, and other high crimes—have been recognized since the 1935 Constitution. Graft and corruption was later added under the 1973 Constitution, while betrayal of public trust was introduced in the current 1987 Constitution.

== Impeachment procedure ==
Flowchart summarizing the impeachment process from the House of Representatives to the Senate

The procedure for impeachment in the Philippines is governed by a combination of constitutional mandates, parliamentary rules, and jurisprudential interpretations. The Constitution establishes the fundamental framework: the House of Representatives holds the exclusive power to initiate impeachment cases—requiring a minimum one-third vote to formally adopt and transmit articles of impeachment—while the Senate holds the sole authority to try and decide them. Beyond this overarching House-to-Senate pipeline, the Constitution grants both chambers the autonomy to promulgate their own specific rules of procedure. The precise mechanics of the process are dictated by the rules adopted by the respective chambers—currently, as of April 2026, the House rules of the 19th Congress (as adopted by the 20th Congress) and the Senate rules of procedure as of March 2026. Furthermore, the application of these rules is strictly guided by Supreme Court rulings, which have established binding legal interpretations for previously ambiguous constitutional terms, such as the exact moment of "initiation" for a complaint and the legal counting of "session days."

=== Filing of verified complaint ===
The power to initiate cases of impeachment belongs exclusively to the House of Representatives, the lower chamber of Congress. This initial phase begins with the filing of a case, formally called a "verified complaint," which must be sworn under oath and based on either personal knowledge or authentic records. A verified complaint can be introduced in one of three ways:

1. By any member of the House
2. By any citizen, provided their complaint is endorsed by any member of the House
3. Through a resolution of impeachment filed directly by at least one-third of all members of the House

If the complaint is introduced through the third mode, it is automatically constituted as the articles of impeachment and is immediately transmitted to the Senate. Otherwise, the complaint must go through scrutiny by the House Committee on Justice first.

=== House justice committee deliberations ===
After the verified complaint is initially filed with the Office of the Secretary-General, it is transmitted it to the speaker of the House. Upon receipt, the speaker must include the complaint in the chamber's order of business within ten session days. Within three session days thereafter, the complaint must be formally referred to the House Committee on Justice.

==== Sufficiency in form, substance, and grounds ====
In cases where multiple complaints are filed against the same official, the committee first convenes to consolidate them. Through a series of separate proceedings, the committee evaluates the complaint to determine:

1. Whether it is sufficient in form;
2. Whether it is sufficient in substance; and
3. Whether there are sufficient grounds

A complaint is deemed sufficient in form if it is properly signed by the complainant, verified under oath (affirming that the allegations are based on personal knowledge or authentic records), and formally endorsed by a member of the House of Representatives through a resolution. If the committee finds it insufficient in form, the complaint is returned to the secretary-general within three session days alongside a written explanation, effectively dismissing the complaint.

Only if the complaint passes the test of form does the committee assess its sufficiency in substance. This step determines whether the allegations in the complaint, assuming they are true, actually constitute recognized impeachable offenses that fall under the committee's jurisdiction. If it fails this test, the complaint is dismissed.

Once a complaint is deemed sufficient in both form and substance, the committee issues a notice to the accused official (the respondent), accompanied by a copy of the complaint. The respondent is given ten days to file a formal answer, which may include their legal defenses; filing a motion to dismiss is strictly prohibited at this stage. If the respondent fails to submit an answer within the deadline, this failure is legally treated as a general denial of all accusations. Upon receiving the respondent's answer, the complainants have three days to file a reply. The respondent then has three days from the receipt of the reply to submit a rejoinder. Throughout this pleading period, both parties submit their affidavits, counter-affidavits, and all supporting documentary evidence.

Unlike the assessment of sufficiency in substance—which relies exclusively on the allegations within the complaint—the determination of "sufficiency of grounds" evaluates the totality of the pleadings, taking into account the complaint, the answer, the reply, and the rejoinder. If the committee determines that sufficient grounds exist, it proceeds to conduct formal hearings where evidence is presented and witnesses are examined. Conversely, if the grounds are deemed insufficient, the case is dismissed.

==== Hearing proper ====
During the formal impeachment hearing, often referred to as the hearing proper, the House Committee on Justice examines witnesses and documentary evidence. The committee has the authority to issue compulsory processes—including subpoenas—to compel the attendance of witnesses and the production of relevant documents. Additionally, the committee chairperson may limit the time allocated for the direct and cross-examination of witnesses.

The primary purpose of these hearings is to determine whether there is probable cause to impeach the accused official. After all evidence has been presented, the committee may require both parties to submit memoranda summarizing their respective arguments before a final resolution is made. Upon concluding these proceedings, the committee members vote on whether probable cause exists. If a majority of all committee members votes in favor, the committee submits a formal report to the House plenary—the full assembly of all House representatives. This report includes a resolution detailing the specific articles of impeachment. Otherwise, the committee submits a report accompanied by a resolution recommending the dismissal of the complaint.

=== House plenary vote ===
Once the House Committee on Justice submits its report and corresponding resolution, the entire House of Representatives conducts a plenary vote. This vote occurs regardless of whether the committee's resolution recommends impeachment or the dismissal of the complaint. During this process, the vote is conducted by roll call, with the House secretary-general formally recording the vote of each member.

If the committee's report is favorable, an affirmative vote of at least one-third of all House members is required to adopt the articles of impeachment and transmit them to the Senate. Conversely, if the committee recommended dismissal, the House plenary may still override this recommendation with the same one-third affirmative vote. Should the override succeed, the committee is formally required to draft the articles of impeachment for transmittal to the Senate. In either scenario, if the one-third vote threshold is not met, the impeachment complaint is dismissed.

=== Senate trial ===
Upon the transmittal of the articles of impeachment from the House of Representatives, the Constitution mandates that the trial by the Senate shall "forthwith proceed." The Constitution grants the Senate the sole authority to try and decide impeachment cases.

During an impeachment trial, the House acts as the prosecutor, represented by a panel of 11 members selected from its own members., who may be assisted by private lawyers given they are supervised directly by the panel.. The impeached official is defended by his or her own chosen counsel.

==== Convening the impeachment court ====
The presiding officer of the trial depends on the official being impeached. If the Philippine president is on trial, the chief justice presides but does not vote. In such case, the Senate president formally requests the chief justice to attend at a specified time and place for the consideration of the articles of impeachment. For all other officials, the Senate president serves at the presiding officer.

Before considering the articles of impeachment and beginning the trial, the presiding officer takes a prescribed oath and subsequently administers an oath or affirmation to all senators to do "impartial justice according to the Constitution and laws of the Philippines." The senators are required by the rules to "observe political neutrality," defined as exercising their duty "without unfair discrimination and regardless of party affiliation or preference."

==== Summons and pleadings ====
Following the organization of the Senate as an impeachment court, a writ of summons is issued to the impeached official, incorporating the articles of impeachment and directing them to appear at a schedule and venue decided by the Senate. The official is given a non-extendible period of 10 days after receiving the summons to file an answer to the articles of impeachment. The prosecutors then have a non-extendible period of 5 days to file a reply.

If the impeached official fails to appear or fails to file an answer, the trial proceeds as if a "not guilty" plea had been entered. Conversely, if a "guilty" plea is entered, the Senate may immediately enter a judgement without further proceedings.

==== Conduct of the trial ====
At 2:00 pm (or another hour designated by the Senate) on the scheduled day, the Senate suspends its regular legislative business to formally notify the House of Representatives that the upper chamber is ready to proceed. The secretary of the Senate is responsible for recording the proceedings. Throughout the trial, the doors of the Senate must remain open to the public; however, visitors are required to observe strict silence, and failure to do so may result in eviction.

The presentation of the case begins with opening statements. To maintain order, these initial remarks are limited to one representative from the prosecution and one from the defense.

During the trial, both sides present their arguments, documents, and witnesses. The impeached official is not required to appear in person or take the witness stand. When witnesses are called, they are administered a specific oath to tell the truth. To ensure an organized process, the direct examination (the initial questioning by the party who called the witness) is conducted by a single person, followed by cross-examination by one person from the opposing side.

Unlike in regular court trials where judges infrequently interject, the senators act as "senator-judges" and can actively participate by questioning witnesses, prosecutors, or defense counsels. To keep the trial moving, this questioning is strictly limited to two minutes per senator. All formal procedural requests—such as motions, objections, and applications—must be addressed directly to the presiding officer. If disputes arise over preliminary matters or interlocutory questions (legal issues that must be resolved before the trial can conclude), each side is given a maximum of one hour to argue their stance.

Once the presentation of evidence concludes, the trial moves to final arguments on the merits, where both sides summarize the core facts and legal points of the case. These closing arguments may be delivered by up to two persons from each side, with the House of Representatives holding the right to both open and close this final phase.

==== Voting and final judgment ====
The Senate must fully complete the trial for all the articles of impeachment before any voting can commence. The presiding officer states the question for each article separately. During the roll call vote, each senator must rise as their name is called and explicitly declare "guilty" or "not guilty." If they choose to, senators are allowed up to two minutes to explain the reasoning behind their vote.

To secure a conviction, at least two-thirds of all members of the Senate must vote "guilty" on a given article. If this supermajority is reached on any single article, the Senate pronounces a judgment of conviction, which results in the official's immediate removal from office and disqualification from holding any future government positions. If no single article receives the required two-thirds vote, a judgment of acquittal (a formal declaration that the charges were not sustained) is entered. Regardless of the outcome, Senate rules explicitly prohibit any motion to reconsider the final vote, meaning the decision is final and cannot be reopened.

== Limits and issues ==
=== House of Representatives proceedings ===
==== One-year bar rule and definition of "initiation" ====
The one-year bar rule is a provision in the Philippine Constitution stating that "no impeachment proceedings shall be initiated against the same official more than once within a period of one year." If an impeachment complaint is dismissed at any stage, the accused official effectively gains a one-year immunity against new impeachment efforts. The Supreme Court has noted that this limitation exists to prevent the abuse of the impeachment mechanism for partisan political ends, ensuring that proceedings are conducted fairly and with respect for the accused's constitutional rights.

The exact point at which an impeachment proceeding is deemed "initiated"—thereby triggering the one-year bar—has been the subject of significant legal debate. In its 2003 ruling on the attempted impeachment of Chief Justice Hilario Davide Jr. (Francisco Jr. v. House of Representatives), the Supreme Court ruled that "initiation" refers to the act of filing the complaint coupled with the House taking initial action on it, specifically by referring the complaint to the House Committee on Justice. However, this interpretation was subsequently utilized as a political shield during the administration of President Gloria Macapagal Arroyo; her allies would preemptively file weak impeachment complaints that were swiftly dismissed, deliberately triggering the one-year ban to block legitimate complaints.

In 2011 (Gutierrez v. House of Representatives), the Court clarified that the one-year bar is not violated if the House Committee on Justice entertains multiple complaints received around the same time, provided they are treated as a single, consolidated proceeding. This standard was reaffirmed in 2026, establishing that filing multiple complaints against the same official is permissible as long as they are properly consolidated into one case.

The mechanics of the one-year bar became a central issue during the 2025 impeachment proceedings against Vice President Sara Duterte, who faced four separate complaints in the House of Representatives. The first three complaints were filed by various groups, while a fourth complaint was directly endorsed by the required one-third of House members. The Supreme Court ultimately voided the impeachment arising from the fourth complaint, ruling that the House's handling of the first three complaints had already triggered the one-year bar.

In its final 2026 ruling on the Duterte case, the Supreme Court expanded upon its previous definitions and detailed strict standards for what constitutes the "initiation" of an impeachment. Initiation is now deemed to occur when any of the following happens:

- A verified complaint is formally referred to the House Committee on Justice;
- A properly endorsed complaint is not placed in the House order of business within the mandated 10 session days, or is not referred to the Committee within three session days after being placed in the order of business; or
- The House takes no action before Congress adjourns sine die (indefinitely) without transmitting articles of impeachment to the Senate.

Applying these rules to Sara Duterte's 2025 impeachment, the Supreme Court ruled that because the House of Representatives failed to include the first three complaints in its order of business within the constitutionally mandated 10-session-day window, those complaints were legally "initiated" by default, thereby barring the fourth complaint from proceeding.

In practice, the Supreme Court interprets the one-year bar as a rolling 12-month period rather than a strict calendar year (that is, from January 1 to December 31). For example, in the Duterte impeachment case, because the Court determined the handling of the first three complaints officially triggered the one-year bar on February 5, 2025, it ruled that no new impeachment proceedings could commence against her until February 6, 2026.

==== Timeline and definition of "session days" ====
The Philippine Constitution mandates strict timelines, measured in "session days," for the House of Representatives to process an impeachment complaint:

- Once a verified complaint is filed, it must be included in the House's order of business within ten session days.
- After being placed in the order of business, the complaint must be referred to the House Committee on Justice within three session days.
- The Committee on Justice then has a maximum of 60 session days from the date of that referral to conduct its investigation, hold hearings, and submit its formal report to the House.
- Upon receiving the committee's report, the House must calendar the resolution for consideration within ten session days.

The precise legal definition of what constitutes a "session day" was previously a subject of debate. Historically, the House of Representatives argued that "session days" referred exclusively to specific days dedicated to legislative business, which should be legally distinguished from standard "calendar" or "working" days. Under this interpretation, the chamber maintained that a single session day could legally stretch across multiple calendar days if the legislative session was merely suspended rather than formally adjourned.

However, in its final 2026 ruling on the impeachment of Sara Duterte, the Supreme Court rejected this parliamentary interpretation. The Court established that a "session day" must be strictly defined as any calendar day on which the House of Representatives actually convenes and holds a session.

=== Supreme Court jurisdiction and intervention ===
Article VIII, Section 1 of the 1987 Constitution grants the Supreme Court an "expanded certiorari jurisdiction," which the Court has since used to justify its intervention in impeachment disputes. Constitutional framer Rene Sarmiento supported the view that the Supreme Court can and should step in to resolve petitions that question the legislature's compliance with specific provisions in the Constitution. Former Ombudsman and Supreme Court Justice Conchita Carpio-Morales similarly asserted that this expanded jurisdiction allows the Court to intervene—"as long as the question is not political"—whenever there is an actual controversy involving the demandable rights of the people or when the impeachment court commits a "grave abuse of discretion."

In 2025, the Supreme Court utilized this power to bar the impeachment of Vice President Sara Duterte, issuing its final ruling on the matter in 2026. This intervention drew sharp criticism from lawmakers. Representative Leila de Lima argued that the Court had "crossed from interpretation into legislation" by creating "new rules, new times, and new consequences that are nowhere found in the text," specifically referring to the Court's expanded definition of when a complaint is legally "initiated." Similarly, Senate President Tito Sotto accused the judiciary of "overreach" for prescribing procedural rules for Congress to abide by. Sotto argued that the Court had effectively "amended" the Constitution through its ruling, famously calling future impeachments "an impossible dream."

=== Senate trial mechanics ===
==== "Forthwith" trial ====
The "forthwith" clause is found in Article XI, Section 3(4) of the Philippine Constitution. It dictates that if a verified complaint or resolution of impeachment is filed by at least one-third of all members of the House of Representatives, it automatically constitutes the articles of impeachment, and the "trial by the Senate shall forthwith proceed."

This clause was a new addition to the 1987 charter; it did not exist in the 1935 or 1973 Philippine constitutions, nor is it found in the US Constitution. In the official Filipino language translation of the Constitution, "forthwith" is rendered as "dapat isunod agad" (lit. 'right away'). The framers of the Constitution intentionally used this phrasing to convey immediacy and urgency in the proceedings.

The primary constitutional debate surrounding the "forthwith" clause is whether it compels the Senate to immediately convene and conduct an impeachment trial even if Congress is currently on a legislative recess. This issue came to a head during the 2025 impeachment of Sara Duterte, when the articles of impeachment were transmitted to the Senate on the last session day before the 19th Congress went on a three-month recess. Then-Senate President Francis Escudero maintained that no impeachment trial could take place while Congress is on recess, arguing that the Senate must be in active session to legally convene as an impeachment court. Escudero further pointed out that no previous Congress had ever convened during a recess to start an impeachment proceeding, citing the precedents set by the cases of former Chief Justice Renato Corona and former Ombudsman Merceditas Gutierrez.

Conversely, legal scholars and civil society groups pressured the Senate to strictly abide by the Constitution, arguing that "forthwith" means immediately and not merely at the Senate's convenience. Rene Sarmiento, a framer of the 1987 Constitution, asserted that the Senate must conduct the trial immediately regardless of its legislative calendar. Emphasizing the doctrine of constitutional supremacy, he argued that internal Senate rules must yield to the explicit constitutional command to "forthwith proceed."

Former Senate President Franklin Drilon offered a different perspective, noting that the Senate cannot exercise its plenary powers or formally constitute itself as an impeachment court while on recess. However, he asserted that a proper way to comply with the "forthwith" clause without violating parliamentary rules would be for the Philippine president to call a special session of Congress specifically to initiate the trial. Conchita Carpio-Morales, a former Ombudsman and Supreme Court justice, agreed that "forthwith" means without delay, but noted a legal complication with Drilon's workaround: because special sessions are constitutionally reserved for urgent legislative matters, and impeachment is a non-legislative function, a trial still cannot be legally conducted during a recess.

==== Remand of impeachment articles ====
During the 2025 impeachment of Sara Duterte, the Senate convened as an impeachment court on June 10, 2025, just days after resuming its session following a recess. However, instead of commencing the trial forthwith, the Senate voted 18–5 to remand—or formally return—the articles of impeachment to the House of Representatives. This procedure was unprecedented, as such a mechanism exists nowhere in the Constitution nor in the Senate's established rules of procedure. The return of the articles, which was likened to the remand process used in standard appellate courts, was proposed by Senator Alan Peter Cayetano. He argued that the House needed to certify it had not violated the Constitution during its drafting process and confirm it still intended to pursue the trial.

The move to remand drew immediate criticism. Representative Lorenz Defensor, serving as a House impeachment prosecutor, stated that it set a "dangerous precedent," while Senator Risa Hontiveros warned the action amounted to a "functional dismissal" of the impeachment case. Constitutional law experts, including Howard Calleja and Lorna Kapunan, also argued against the move, asserting that the Constitution does not grant the Senate the authority to review or remand articles of impeachment once they have been formally transmitted.

In response, Senate President Francis Escudero defended the decision, asserting that the Senate, when sitting as an impeachment court, is sui generis (in a class of its own) and is empowered to dictate its own ad hoc procedures provided they are approved by a vote of its members. Reginald Tongol, the official spokesperson for the impeachment court, framed the remand as an "action of liberality." He argued it was a fair compromise that allowed the House to rectify alleged procedural deficiencies, rather than having the Senate exercise its absolute power to dismiss the complaint entirely. The initial motion to dismiss—which Cayetano later amended into the motion to remand—was originally introduced by Senator Ronald dela Rosa. Dela Rosa argued that the House needed to clarify its proceedings because several earlier, stalled complaints filed against Duterte in the lower chamber potentially violated the constitutional ban on initiating multiple impeachment proceedings within a single year.

=== Resignation and perpetual disqualification ===
Historically, the Senate's practice has been to terminate or forego an impeachment trial once the respondent resigns. In 2001, the impeachment trial of President Joseph Estrada was interrupted by the EDSA II mass protests. Following his departure from office, the Senate declared the impeachment court functus officio (having fulfilled its purpose) and terminated the trial, with senators reasoning that the primary goal of the trial—removing the president from office—had already been achieved. In 2011, Ombudsman Merceditas Gutierrez resigned after being impeached by the House but before her Senate trial could begin. Consequently, the Senate "archived" the case and no longer proceeded with the trial. Similarly, in 2017, Commission on Elections Chairman Andres Bautista resigned just as the House plenary voted to override the dismissal recommendation and prepare the articles of impeachment against him, and the Senate did not take further action.

Despite these past practices, legal experts and former officials argue that strategic resignation should not automatically preclude or cancel a trial because of the disqualification clause found in the 1987 Constitution. Article XI, Section 3(7) explicitly states that judgment in impeachment cases shall extend to removal from office and disqualification to hold any office under the Republic of the Philippines. According to former Senate President Franklin Drilon, while resignation renders the issue of removal from office moot, the question of perpetual disqualification remains a live and valid issue that the Senate has the power to resolve. University of the Philippines law professor Theodore Te notes that while disqualification is an accessory penalty in criminal law, it is a main, separate consequence of a conviction in impeachment. Otherwise, he notes, if an official can simply resign to evade a guilty verdict, they bypass the constitutional safeguard of disqualification and remain free to hold public office again. This loophole was clearly demonstrated when Joseph Estrada, whose trial was aborted, was later pardoned and successfully ran for Mayor of Manila. House Committee on Justice chair Gerville Luistro similarly remarked that disqualification from future office is one of two principal penalties, and impeachment proceedings should continue until the Senate trial.

In a differing view, Antonio Carpio, former senior associate justice of the Supreme Court, believes the perpetual disqualification penalty will no longer apply if the impeached official resigns from office.

== History of impeachment complaints ==
=== Third Republic ===
President Elpidio Quirino was accused in 1949 of using government fund to renovate Malacañang Palace, using government funds to purchase furniture for the Presidential Palace and linking him to alleged diamond smuggling. At the time, a Congressional committee rejected this complaint for lack of factual and legal basis.

In 1964, President Diosdado Macapagal was accused of illegally importing rice to build public support in an election, illegally dismissing officials, using the military to intimidate the political opposition, and ordering the deportation of an American businessman who was in the custody of Congress in violation of the separation of governmental powers. Despite investigation, a Congressional committee dismissed all the charges.

=== Fourth Republic ===
President Ferdinand Marcos was accused by 56 lawmakers on 1985 of graft, economic plunder, unexplained wealth, granting monopolies to cronies, and other crimes. The following day, the National Assembly committee dismissed the complaints after roughly five hours of discussions for continuing unsupported conclusions.

=== Fifth Republic ===
President Corazon Aquino was accused by lawmakers in 1988 of graft and violating the Constitution. The charges were rejected by Congress the following month due to lack of evidence.

President Joseph Estrada was accused of bribery, graft and corruption, betrayal of public trust, and culpable violation of the Constitution. In the formal proceedings, the House of Representatives choose 11 members to act as prosecutors while the Senate would be required to have entire membership sit in as impeachment judges. On November 13, 2000, then-House Speaker Manny Villar sent the articles of impeachment to the Senate for the impeachment trial following a successful motion in the lower chamber.

The impeachment trial started on December 7, 2000, which was presided by then-Chief Justice Hilario Davide, Jr. but was aborted on January 16, 2001, after the House private prosecutors walked out from the impeachment proceedings, to protest against the perceived dictatorial tendency of the eleven senator-judges, who supported President Estrada. The walkout led to Second EDSA Revolution and the downfall of President Estrada.

President Gloria Macapagal Arroyo faced multiple impeachment complaints in 2005, 2006, 2007, and 2008 for different accusations such as lying, cheating, and stealing during 2004 presidential election against opposition candidate Fernando Poe, Jr. among other charges. However, all impeachment cases failed due to absence of one third vote from the members of Congress.

President Benigno Aquino III was charged with four impeachment complaints in 2014 with regards to the Disbursement Acceleration Program (DAP) as it was declared unconstitutional by the Supreme Court. In addition, the Enhanced Defense Cooperation Agreement (EDCA) between the Philippines and United States was also cited in the impeachment complaints but the House Justice Committee ultimately rejected them due to lack of substance.

In 2017 and 2019, impeachment complaints had been filed against both President Rodrigo Duterte and Vice President Leni Robredo but faced a lack of evidence.

In February 2025, Vice President Sara Duterte was formally impeached by the House of representatives after the complaint received a two-thirds majority vote. House Speaker Martin Romualdez announced that he would immediately transmit the documents to the Senate. Senate President Francis Escudero said that the upper chamber would follow due process and only begin the trial after his fellow Senators returned from their break which would take place after the 2025 midterms had already concluded.

=== Other government officials ===
Ombudsman Aniano Desierto was criticized by some for not aggressively investigating and prosecuting cases of corruption. The impeachment failed.

COMELEC commissioner Luzviminda Tancangco was accused of graft and corruption, betrayal of public trust and culpable violation of the Constitution. She allegedly showed bias for the multi-billion-peso voters registration and information system (VRIS) project, deciding to undertake it despite the lack of funds.

Chief Justice Hilario Davide, Jr. was accused of culpable violation of the Constitution, betrayal of the public trust and other high crimes.

COMELEC Chairman Benjamin Abalos was accused of ZTE national broadband network (NBN) deal and Hello Garci controversy but resigned eventually.

Ombudsman Merceditas Gutierrez was impeached on March 22, 2011, on charges of the office's underperformance and failure to act on several cases during then-President Gloria Macapagal Arroyo's administration. The first impeachment complaint against Gutierrez was filed in 2009, but was dismissed later in that year in a House dominated by Arroyo's Lakas Kampi CMD party.

In December 2011, 188 of the 285 members of the House of Representatives voted to transmit the 56-page Articles of Impeachment against Supreme Court Chief Justice Renato Corona.

Commission on Elections Chairman Andres Bautista had filed a resignation on October 11, 2017, but with effectivity date on December 31, 2017. But due to not stating immediate effectivity of the resignation, on the same day, the House of Representatives still voted to impeach the poll chief with 137 votes (more than 1/3 votes) from the House, overturning a justice committee resolution that earlier dismissed the complaint against him. Bautista eventually made his resignation effective later in the month, before the Senate convened as an impeachment court.

Impeachment proceeding of Chief Justice Maria Lourdes Sereno was terminated after she was removed on May 11, 2018, via quo warranto by a special en banc session of the Supreme Court which also ruled that the Chief Justice post vacant; the petition alleged Sereno's appointment was void ab initio due to her failure in complying with the Judicial and Bar Council requirements.

Supreme Court Associate Justice Marvic Leonen was charged in 2020, of a impeachment complaint filed by Edwin Cordevilla, the secretary-general of the Filipino League of Advocates for Good Government, in relations to the alleged failure to file his Statement of Assets and Liabilities (SALN) and supposed delays in resolution of cases, including the ones pending before the House of Representatives Electoral Tribunal, but the House Justice Committee rejects the complaint due to insufficiency in form.

=== Public officials impeached ===
These are the people who were impeached by the House of Representatives in plenary. To date, Corona's removal as Chief Justice and disqualification from public office is the only instance where the impeachment process has been completed. Estrada's impeachment trial ended prematurely, while Gutierrez and Bautista resigned before the Senate convened as an impeachment court. Sara Duterte's trial was halted upon the archiving of the Articles of Impeachment. Duterte is also the first Philippine official to be impeached twice.

#	Date of Impeachment	Accused	Filed by	Result
1	November 13, 2000	Joseph Estrada; President of the Philippines	Opposition bloc led by House Minority Leader Feliciano Belmonte Jr.	House of Representatives approved the Articles of Impeachment with 115 affirmative votes. Trial aborted on January 17, 2001, Declared as resigned by the Supreme Court and left office on January 20, 2001.
2	March 22, 2011	Merceditas Gutierrez; Ombudsman	31 civil society leaders led by former Senate President Jovito Salonga and Bagong Alyansang Makabayan	House of Representatives approved the Articles of Impeachement by the vote of 241–47 with 4 abstentions. Resigned on April 29, 2011, before trial by the Senate.
3	December 12, 2011	Renato Corona; Chief Justice of the Supreme Court	Former Akbayan representative Risa Hontiveros, Jun Lozada, Juan Carlo Tejano, and Leah Navarro	Removed and disqualified by the Senate on May 29, 2012, by the vote of 20–3.
4	October 11, 2017	Andres Bautista; Chairman of the Commission on Elections	Former Kabayan representative Harry Roque	House of Representatives approved the Articles of Impeachment by the vote of 137–75 with 2 abstentions. Resigned on October 23, 2017, before trial by the Senate.
5	February 5, 2025	, Sara Duterte; Vice President of the Philippines	Consolidation of complaints filed by former Magdalo representative Gary Alejano, civil society leaders, Bagong Alyansang Makabayan, lawyers, and religious leaders	House of Representatives approved the Articles of Impeachment with 215 affirmative votes. Impeachment trial was halted upon the archiving of the Articles of Impeachment by the Senate by a vote of 19–4 and 1 abstention.
5	May 11, 2026	, Sara Duterte; Vice President of the Philippines	Consolidation of complaints filed by the religious sector led by Joel Saballa, et al. and Nathaniel Cabrera	House of Representatives approved the Articles of Impeachment by the vote of 257–25 with 9 abstentions. Impeachment trial in the Senate is ongoing.

== See also ==
- Quo warranto petition against Maria Lourdes Sereno, removal of an impeachable official via quo warranto petition
