= Impeachment of Merceditas Gutierrez =

2011 Philippine charging of the Ombudsman

- The Ombudsman building
- Accused: Merceditas Gutierrez, Ombudsman of the Philippines
- Proponents: Former Senate President Jovito Salonga, Bagong Alyansang Makabayan and 31 civil society leaders
- Date: 22 March – 29 April 2011
- Outcome: Impeached by the House of Representatives; Gutierrez resigns from office
- Charges: Betrayal of public trust; Culpable violation of the constitution

Impeachment vote by the House of Representatives (March 22, 2011)
- Votes in favor: 212 / 284 (75%)
- Votes against: 46 / 284 (16%)
- Not voting: 4 / 284 (1%)
- Result: Impeachment successful

The Philippine Ombudsman Merceditas Gutierrez was impeached by the House of Representatives on charges of the office's alleged underperformance and failure to act on several cases during the presidency of Gloria Macapagal Arroyo. She became the second official after President Joseph Estrada in 2000 to be impeached.

While the first impeachment complaint against her was filed in 2009, it was dismissed later in that year in a 14th Congress dominated by Arroyo's Lakas Kampi CMD party. In 2010, with the election of Benigno Aquino III of the Liberal Party as president and the concurrent elections to the House of Representatives and the subsequent political realignment, two impeachment cases against her were voted as sufficient in form, substance and grounds, and the House of Representatives Committee on Justice had found probable cause on alleged betrayal of public trust as based on the two complaints.

On March 22, 2011, the House of Representatives voted to impeach Gutierrez, sending the committee report as the Articles of Impeachment to the Senate, which would have acted as an impeachment court. A vote of at least two-thirds (16) of all senators (24) was required to convict Gutierrez and remove her from office. Gutierrez, however, resigned on April 29, 2011, thereby canceling the impeachment trial in the Senate.

== Background ==
Step	Votes needed	Total members
Approval by the Committee on Justice*: Sufficient in form; Sufficient in substance; Sufficient in grounds; Determination of probable cause	28	55
Approval by the House of Representatives	95	284
Conviction by the Senate	16	24
*While only a majority of the regular members (28) is needed to pass a vote, the votes of the ex officio members such as the Deputy Speakers are counted.

The ombudsman is one of the several impeachable officials: the others being the president, vice president, justices of the Supreme Court and the members of the constitutional commissions (Audit, Civil Service and Elections). The following acts are considered as impeachable offenses: culpable violation of the Constitution, treason, bribery, graft and corruption, other high crimes, and betrayal of public trust. Furthermore, only one "impeachment proceeding" is allowed to be held against an official in a year, although the definition of the term "impeachment proceeding" and "year" have been debated. The House of Representatives has the sole power to impeach, while the Senate has the sole power to try the impeached official. The House of Representatives needs one-third of its members to impeach an official, while the Senate needs to muster two-thirds of its members to convict.

== 2009 case ==
In 2005, Merceditas Gutierrez was appointed by President Gloria Macapagal Arroyo as ombudsman, succeeding outgoing Simeon Marcelo who had resigned. After her appointment, several figures of the Arroyo administration were involved in political scandals such as the NBN-ZTE controversy, the Fertilizer Fund scam, the Euro Generals scandal, among others.

In 2009, a group of civil society personalities led by former Senate President Jovito Salonga filed an impeachment case against Gutierrez on March 2. The complaint, referred to the Committee on Justice headed by Arroyo's partymate at Lakas Kampi CMD Matias Defensor, Jr. of Quezon City, cited these issues:

- Deliberate and inordinate action in the World Bank road project worth US$33 million
- Deliberately ignoring the Supreme Court's ruling dismissing the deal between Mega Pacific Corporation and then Commission on Elections chairman Benjamin Abalos worth PHP1.3 billion
- Filing late and defective information that undermined the cases against former Justice Secretary Hernando Perez, who was charged with extorting money from former Manila Rep. Mark Jimenez
- Gross inexcusable inaction on the cases filed by the Senate, former solicitor general Francisco Chavez and murdered journalist Marlene Garcia-Esperat on the Fertilizer Fund scam worth PHP1 billion;
- Failing to promptly resolve the Euro Generals scandal case despite evidence and admission by the Philippine National Police comptroller, Director Eliseo de la Paz
- Committing grave abuse in dismissing and suspending local government officials, specifically Iloilo Governor Niel Tupas, Sr. and Bataan Governor Enrique Garcia.

On November 18, the House Committee on Justice dismissed the case; while deeming the complaint "sufficient in form," it was deemed as not "sufficient in substance." The committee report stated that "The factual allegations are, at best, a rehash of the allegations for the impeachable offense of betrayal of public trust," and that the suspensions of Tupas and Garcia were justifiable. The report was brought to the plenary on November 18.

== 2010 cases ==
In 2010, two impeachment cases were filed against Gutierrez, both by left-leaning parties: first from Akbayan Citizens' Action Party and one from the Bagong Alyansang Makabayan (BAYAN; New Patriotic Alliance). These two complaints were referred to the Committee on Justice which is now chaired by Iloilo's 5th district representative Niel Tupas, Jr. of President Aquino's Liberal Party at August 22.

While Akbayan and BAYAN are both left-leaning parties, they are ideological rivals.

=== Complaints ===
==== Akbayan complaint ====
In July 2010, former Akbayan representative Risa Hontiveros-Baraquel led the filing of an impeachment complaint against Gutierrez. The complaint cited these issues:

- Low conviction rate of the ombudsman
- Failure to act promptly on the Philippine National Broadband Network controversy
- Incurred inexcusable delay in the investigation on the death of ensign Philip Pestaño
- Legitimized the arrest of Hontiveros by the police at the height of the Hello Garci scandal
- Failure to investigate Arroyo's PHP1 million dinner at New York's Le Cirque restaurant
- Failure to act on the Mega Pacific scandal, among others
- Refusal to grant ready access to public records such as the Statement of Assets, Net Worth and Liabilities of former Pampanga Rep. Mikey Arroyo.

==== BAYAN complaint ====
BAYAN filed their own case on early August 2010. Led by Renato Reyes, BAYAN cited these issues on their complaint:

- Failure to act on the Fertilizer Fund scam
- Failure to act on the Euro Generals scandal
- Failure to act on the Mega Pacific scandal

=== Sufficient in form and substance ===
The House of Representatives' Committee on Justice voted on September 1, 2010, that the two complaints are sufficient in form. With the result, further hearings would be held to determine if the two complaints are sufficient in substance.

A week later, the committee voted that the two complaints are sufficient in substance: the first complaint passed via a 41–14 vote, while the second complaint passed with a 41–16 vote, with Pwersa ng Masang Pilipino (PMP; Force of the Filipino Masses)'s Rufus Rodriguez of Cagayan de Oro's 2nd district abstaining as he refused to recognize the second complaint. The committee vote was the first time an impeachment complaint was deemed to be sufficient in substance since the Arroyo presidency. The minority bloc tried to delay the vote by objecting the approval of the minutes, and denying that they were supplied with copies of the complaints, even if their staff had earlier stated that they had received them. Lakas Kampi CMD's Simeon Datumanong of Maguindanao's 2nd district insisted that the second complaint be barred; Majority leader Neptali Gonzales II of Mandaluyong answered that while the constitution forbids two impeachment proceedings, it does not forbid two impeachment complaints, adding that the two complaints can be consolidated for they were simultaneously referred to the committee.

On the same day, Iloilo 4th district Representative Ferjenel Biron and former Iloilo vice governor Rolex Suplico of the Nacionalista Party disclosed that Tupas had a pending case on the ombudsman, and that he should recuse himself from the proceedings. Suplico filed a complaint against Tupas on the latter's alleged "ghost seminars" while he was still a member of the Iloilo Provincial Board. Tupas defeated Suplico in the 2010 Iloilo 5th district House of Representatives election, while Biron defeated Tupas' father in the 2010 Iloilo 4th district House of Representatives election.

=== Supreme Court's status quo ante order ===
How the justices voted
Justice	Granting	Lifting	Reconsideration
Corona	Concurred	Dissented	Dissented
Carpio	Dissented	Concurred	Concurred
Carpio-Morales	Dissented	Concurred	Concurred
Mendoza	On leave	Concurred	Concurred
Abad	Concurred	Concurred	Concurred
Sereno	Dissented	Concurred	Concurred
Nachura	On leave	Concurred	Concurred
Villarama	Concurred	Concurred	Concurred
Brion	On leave	Dissented	Dissented
Bersamin	Concurred	Dissented	Dissented
De Castro	On leave	Dissented	Dissented
Peralta	Concurred	Dissented	Dissented
Del Castillo	Concurred	Concurred partially	Concurred partially
Perez	Concurred	Concurred partially	Concurred partially
Velasco	Concurred	Recused	Recused
Concurrence	8	7	7
Dissention	3	5	5

On September 13, Gutierrez filed a petition for certiorari and prohibition to the Supreme Court to stop the impeachment proceedings against her. Gutierrez cited the one-year ban hearing more than one impeachment proceedings. Tupas said that in a previous decision, the Supreme Court allowed two separate complaints initiated at the same time. The next day, the court granted Gutierrez a status quo ante order, or all parties should observe the conditions prior to the proceedings, thereby suspending impeachment proceedings against her.

The representatives protested the status quo ante order, with Akbayan representative Walden Bello saying that "it is an interference with the prerogative of a co-equal branch of government," adding that only Congress can "promulgate" its own rules on impeachment. Speaker of the House of Representatives Feliciano Belmonte (Liberal, Quezon City–4th) had earlier said that while it respects the court's decision, the House of Representatives will proceed with its impeachment proceedings. The move was seen to benefit Gutierrez, and former president and now Pampanga 2nd district representative Arroyo;

Five months later on February 15, 2011, the Supreme Court dismissed their status quo ante order, "thereby effectively allowing the House committee on justice to proceed with the impeachment," said court spokesman Midas Marquez. There were seven justices concurring, five dissenting, and another two concurring on allowing the first of the complaints from proceeding; Justice Presbitero Velasco recused himself as his son is a member of the House of Representatives (representing Marinduque as member of the Lakas-Kampi). Marquez said that while there were two separate complaints, "there is only one proceeding." The court ruled that since Gutierrez can still file an answer, hence there was no violation of due process.

However, further hearings were held off as the Supreme Court as not given a final decision on Gutierrez's petition. Speaker Belmonte said that the committee cannot meet until the court's decision is finalized. Meanwhile, the executive announced that it would not interfere with the proceedings at the House of Representatives. On February 22, the committee voted to resume their impeachment hearings in a 21–5 vote, after a meeting with Belmonte, who became convinced that the committee can proceed even without the court's final decision, as stated by Deputy Speaker Lorenzo Taňada III of the Liberal Party from Quezon's 4th district.

Supreme Court Justice Maria Lourdes Sereno later disclosed that the Supreme Court did not debate on the merits on Gutierrez's petition, saying that "several members of the court" had not seen the petition, and that no resolution was made; spokesman Marquez just delivered a news conference to announce the court's ruling. Sereno is the sole appointee of President Aquino; the other 14 justices are appointed by Arroyo.

=== Sufficient grounds ===
A day before the committee (February 28) met to decide if the two complaints are sufficient in grounds, Gutierrez filed before the Supreme Court a motion for reconsideration.

At the hearing, Alagad party-list representative Rodante Marcoleta questioned if the committee should wait for the court's decision on Gutierrez's motion for reconsideration. After the minutes of the previous meeting was approved, Nacionalista Party member Marc Douglas Cagas IV from Davao del Sur's 1st district motioned to reconsider the approval of the minutes, which was denied by vice chairperson Rodolfo Fariñas (Nacionalista, Ilocos Norte–1st) since Cagas was absent at the previous meeting. After several minutes of arguing whether to wait for a Supreme Court decision, Rodolfo Albano (Lakas-Kampi, Isabela–1st) motioned to wait for the decision; the motion was defeated 8–37. Tupas read a letter submitted by Gutierrez, and the representatives debated anew on whether to wait for the court's decision; Fariñas later bared his plan on filing impeachment cases against the justices for not reading Gutierrez's petition before issuing the status quo ante order. The committee ultimately voted that both complaints were sufficient in grounds, with the first complaint passing on a 41–12 vote, and the second complaint approved on a 42–12 decision.

=== Determination of probable cause ===
The day before the hearing for the determination of probable cause, the Liberal Party members of the House of Representatives adapted a position to support the impeachment proceedings at a meeting where President Aquino attended. Apart from the Liberals, seven representatives from militant parties support the impeachment of Gutierrez.

Gutierrez, who had been boycotting the hearings of the committee, instead sent her lawyer and a reply at the March 8 hearing. On her reply, she stated that "She cannot produce documents because this would render, according to her, moot and academic the issues raised in the motion for reconsideration with the Supreme Court," said Tupas, quoting Gutierrez. She further said that the subpoena given to her was oppressive, and that she has confidentiality of records. She instead attended a press conference of the Catholic Bishops Conference of the Philippines where she branded the committee as a "kangaroo court," citing that as a reason for her non-appearance. Gutierrez said that the proceedings were a "partisan political exercise," and that she denied asking for support of Representative Arroyo and her allies in the House of Representatives.

At the hearing, the representatives from the minority hit the lack of due process accorded to Gutierrez, and the railroading of the proceedings. To emphasize the point, minority leader Edcel Lagman (Lakas-Kampi, Albay–1st) and Pedro Romualdo (Lakas-Kampi, Camiguin) brought with them a stack of documents two feet high delivered to them the day before, on which they have to read to make an intelligent assessment of the complaints. Representative from Iloilo's 2nd district Augusto Syjuco asked Tupas to recuse himself as he has a pending case before the ombudsman, but Tupas dismissed his request. Deputy Speaker Raul Daza (Liberal, Northern Samar–1st) remarked that Gutierrez had already been given enough time to respond to the complaints.

While the hearing was ongoing, the Supreme Court dismissed Gutierrez's motion for reconsideration as the committee did not violate the one-year ban on multiple impeachment proceedings, with the spokesman explaining that "These two complaints were received (by the Justice committee) at the same time. Provided there is only one proceeding – regardless of number of complaints – the impeachment proceeding can go on," adding that the decision was final and no more appeals would be accepted. After the committee was notified of the court's decision, the committee decided to put to a vote in determining probable cause. The first (Akbayan's) complaint was voted upon first, and passed with a 39–12 vote and one abstention, while the BAYAN complaint also passed via 39–6 vote, with one abstention; the abstentions came from Lagman.

==== Result of the vote ====
These were the results of the votes according to the Justice Committee:

Representative	Party	Bloc	District	First complaint	Second complaint
Rodolfo Fariñas	Nacionalista	Majority	Ilocos Norte–1st	For	For
Miro Quimbo	Liberal	Majority	Marikina–2nd	For	For
Reynaldo Umali	Liberal	Majority	Oriental Mindoro–2nd	For	For
Andres Salvacion, Jr.	Liberal	Majority	Leyte–3rd	For	For
Roy Loyola	Liberal	Majority	Cavite–3rd	For	For
Ronald Cosalan	Liberal	Majority	Benguet	For	For
Carlo Lopez	Liberal	Majority	Manila–2nd	For	For
Winston Castelo	Liberal	Majority	Quezon City–2nd	For	For
Joseph Emilio Abaya	Liberal	Majority	Cavite–1st	For	For
Henedina Abad	Liberal	Majority	Batanes	For	For
Ma. Evita Arago	Liberal	Majority	Laguna–3rd	For	For
Jocelyn Limkaichong	Liberal	Majority	Negros Oriental–1st	For	For
Irvin Alcala	Liberal	Majority	Quezon–2nd	For	For
Teodoro Baguilat, Jr.	Liberal	Majority	Ifugao	For	For
Eleandro Madrona	Nacionalista	Majority	Romblon	For	For
Ma. Theresa Bonoan-David	Lakas–Kampi	Majority	Manila–4th	For	For
Alfredo Marañon III	Lakas–Kampi	Majority	Negros Occidental–2nd	For	For
Arthur Defensor	Lakas–Kampi	Majority	Iloilo–3rd	For	For
Kaka Bag-ao	Akbayan	Majority	Sectoral	For	For
Mylene Garcia-Albano	Liberal	Majority	Davao City–2nd	For	For
Danilo Fernandez	Lakas–Kampi	Majority	Laguna–1st	For	For
Mark Sambar	PBA	Majority	Sectoral	For	For
David Kho	Senior Citizens	Majority	Sectoral	For	For
Isidro Ungab	Liberal	Majority	Davao City–3rd	For	Not around
Roilo Golez	Liberal	Majority	Parañaque–2nd	For	For
Rodolfo Biazon	Liberal	Majority	Muntinlupa	For	For
Teodoro Casiño	Bayan Muna	Majority	Sectoral	For	For
Emmeline Aglipay	DIWA	Majority	Sectoral	For	For
Marcelino Teodoro*	Liberal	Majority	Marikina–1st	For	For
Raul Daza*	Liberal	Majority	Northern Samar–1st	For	For
Lorenzo Tanada III*	Liberal	Majority	Quezon–4th	For	For
Elpidio Barzaga*	Lakas–Kampi	Majority	Dasmariñas (Cavite–4th)	For	For
Sharon Garin	AAMBIS-Owa	Majority	Sectoral	For	For
Maria Isabelle Climaco*	Liberal	Majority	Zamboanga City–1st	For	For
Paolo Javier*	Liberal	Majority	Antique	For	For
Janette Garin*	Lakas–Kampi	Majority	Iloilo–1st	For	For
Roman Romulo*	Lakas–Kampi	Majority	Pasig	For	For
Jorge Banal, Jr.*	Liberal	Majority	Quezon City–3rd	For	For
Sherwin Tugna*	CIBAC	Majority	Sectoral	For	For
Pedro Romualdo	Lakas–Kampi	Majority	Camiguin	Against	Against
Simeon Datumanong	Lakas–Kampi	Minority	Maguindanao–2nd	Against	Against
Rodolfo Albano	Lakas–Kampi	Minority	Isabela–1st	Against	Against
Orlando Fua	Lakas–Kampi	Minority	Siquijor	Against	Not around
Giorgidi Aggabao	NPC	Majority	Isabela–4th	Against	Against
Danilo Suarez	Lakas–Kampi	Minority	Quezon–3rd	Against	Not around
Augusto Syjuco, Jr.*	Lakas–Kampi	Minority	Iloilo–2nd	Against	Against
Jose Aquino*	Lakas–Kampi	Minority	Agusan del Norte–1st	Against	Not around
Amelita Villarosa*	Lakas–Kampi	Majority	Occidental Mindoro	Against	Against
Edcel Lagman*	Lakas–Kampi	Minority	Albay–1st	Abstained	Abstained

*ex-officio members

=== Referral to the plenary ===
Summary of votation

Motion	Akbayan complaint			BAYAN complaint			Votes needed	Date
Motion	Y	N	A	Y	N	A	Votes needed	Date
Sufficient in form	39	1	0	31	9	0	28	September 1, 2010
Sufficient in substance	41	14	0	41	16	1	28	September 7, 2010
Sufficient grounds	41	12	0	42	12	0	28	March 1, 2011
Determination of probable cause	39	12	1	39	6	1	28	March 8, 2011

Motion	Y	N	A	Votes needed	Date
Referral of the committee report	212	46	4	95	March 22, 2011

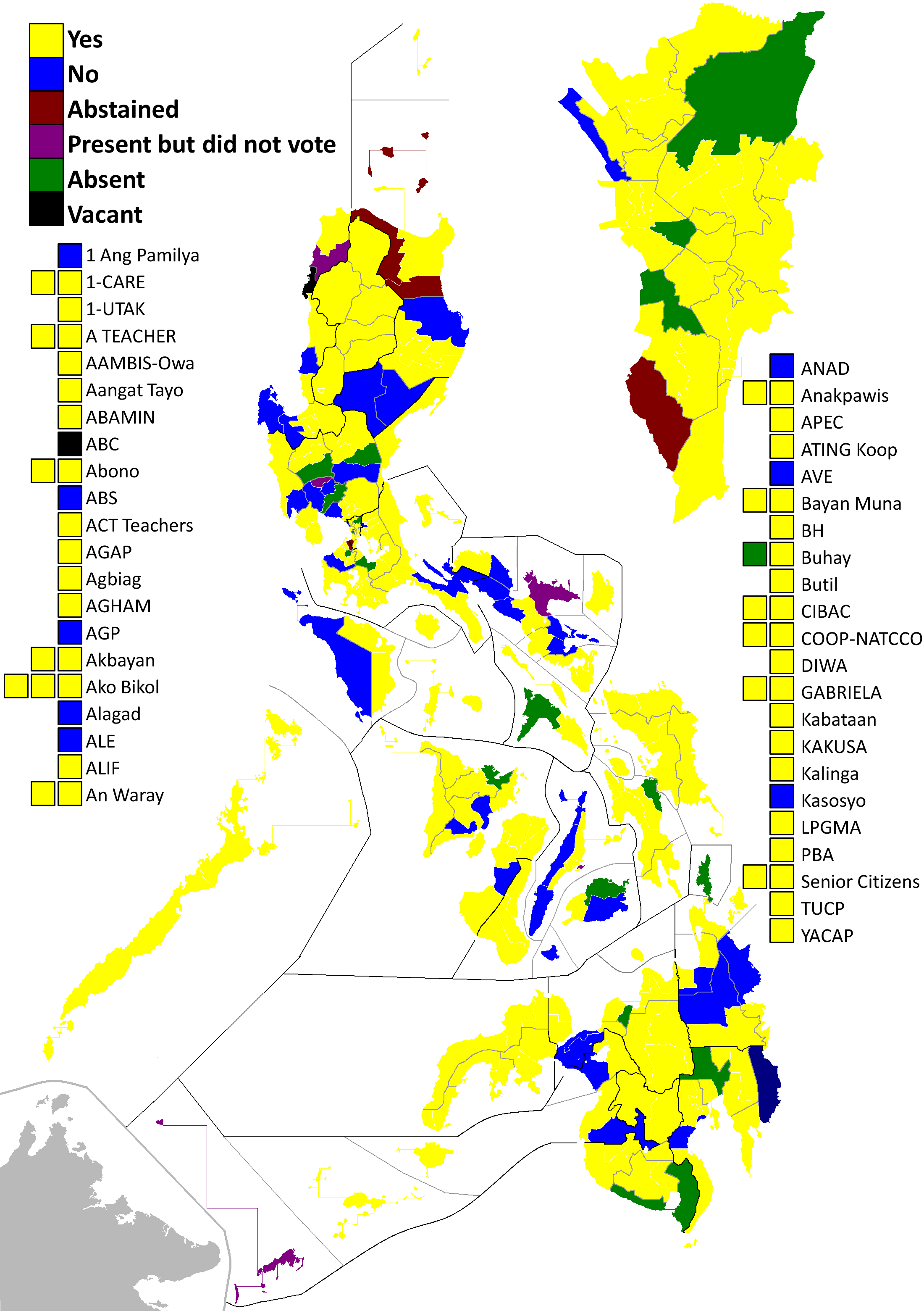
Result of the plenary vote: for sectoral representatives, each box represents one representative, arranged alphabetically. A "yes" vote is colored yellow.

After the committee votes, the committee will submit a committee report to the plenary which shall be voted upon by the entire House. The committee created an 11-man prosecution panel in case the House of Representatives votes to impeach the ombudsman, while a seven-man committee was formed to draft the report.

The senators from the Liberal Party on the hand, say that they were not given instructions on how to deal with an impeachment trial, as there were no senators present at the aforementioned meeting. Sergio Osmeña III said that the president may have to be more discreet on it, while Gregorio Honasan remarked that Aquino should "refrain from making statements that will be misconstrued as partisan statements." Senators Honasan and Osmeña are independents.

Meanwhile, the executive department denied that President Aquino "gave marching orders" to Liberal Party members of the House of Representatives, and that the separation of powers was not violated. This comes as members of the minority bloc criticized Aquino for "dictating" to his allies in the House of Representatives, with Lagman saying that impeachment is not solely political process but is "impressed with judicial process."

The committee report will include the following six allegations that will prove that Gutierrez betrayed the public trust:

- Inaction of the ombudsman in the Fertilizer fund scam
- Inaction of the ombudsman in the Mega Pacific scam
- Inaction of the ombudsman in the Euro Generals scandal
- Failure to make immediate complaints against President Gloria Macapagal Arroyo and her husband Jose Miguel Arroyo due to the Philippine National Broadband Network controversy
- Delay in the investigation of the death of Navy ensign Philip Pestaño
- Low conviction rate of the ombudsman

The following representatives shall compose the House of Representatives' legal team that will present the committee report to the plenary. All are from the Liberal Party unless stated otherwise:

- Niel Tupas, Jr. of Iloilo's 5th district
- Rodolfo Fariñas of Ilocos Norte's 1st district (Nacionalista)
- Reynaldo Umali of Oriental Mindoro's 2nd district
- Lorenzo Tañada III of Quezon's 4th district
- Raul Daza of Northern Samar's 1st district
- Neri Colmenares (Bayan Muna sectoral representative)
- Arlene Bag-ao (Akbayan sectoral representative)
- Joseph Emilio Abaya of Cavite's 1st district
- Another representative to be decided by the plenary

The weekend before the plenary votes on the committee report, Joseph Emilio Abaya, chairman of the Committee on Appropriations, denied accusations that a text attributed to him saying those who would not vote for the impeachment will not receive their share of their pork barrel. Several non-Liberal Party representatives were angry with the text message. Meanwhile, Tupas disclosed that a "high-ranking officer" of the Iglesia ni Cristo had been calling representatives to kill the impeachment complaint, or don't show up at the vote. Bello remarked that this is against the separation of church and state.

On March 21, the House of Representatives tackled the committee's report. Tupas, Daza, Fariñas and Tañada delivered their sponsorship speeches in support of the committee report. After the sponsorship speeches, Representatives Lagman, Suarez, Marcoleta, Carlos M. Padilla, Syjuco, Albano, Mitos Magsaysay and Cagas served as interpellators. In the period of interpellation, Tupas gave way to Fariñas when it was Syjuco's turn to interpellate. Syjuco then accused Tupas of vested interest; Deputy Speaker Arnulfo Fuentebella (NPC, Camarines Sur–4th) reminded him "to avoid attacking personalities," and motioned to strike off Syjuco's remarks from the record for being "unparliamentary language." Syjuco, who called Tupas "a coward," was about to divulge the meeting among Tupas, Tupas Sr., and Gutierrez; Tupas said that as being his godfather at his wedding, he could not face Syjuco. Syjuco later cut short his interpellation, but after accusing Tupas anew of using the impeachment as part of his senatorial ambitions.

Before midnight, the impeachment was put through a vote, after which Deputy Speaker Fuentebella announced the result. With 4 representatives abstaining, 47 against, and 210 for the impeachment, the House impeached Gutierrez. The minority bloc, Nacionalista Party and the NPC did not have a common stand but instead had a "conscience vote." Tañada announced a correction in the tally after some votes were misrecorded, with the revised tally having 212 votes for impeachment, with 46 against and four abstentions. The NPC withdrew the conscience vote and voted for impeachment as a bloc; the newly formed National Unity Party, a party created by Lakas-Kampi defectors was split with some members led by Southern Leyte representative Roger Mercado going against the party's "no" stand. The sectoral representatives also voted for impeachment, in opposition to their leader Rodante Marcoleta (Alagad) who was against. Gutierrez lambasted her impeachment, calling the decision "flimsy" and "lamentable," saying that she did not receive fair treatment and that she is prepared to face the Senate, and blaming "dark" politics with the Justice Committee's undue haste on the proceedings.

The House of Representatives was having a difficult time on naming other members of the prosecution, with Magtanggol Gunigundo I (Lakas-Kampi, Valenzuela–2nd) being added; Elpidio Barzaga (NUP, Dasmariñas (Cavite–4th)) was reportedly considered but his links to Arroyo was seen to be too strong.

== Senate impeachment trial ==
On March 23, Tupas and company, including the two leading complainants, personally submitted to the Senate the Articles of Impeachment. Later that day, the Senate adopted its rules for impeachment, adopting the rules used in the 2000 impeachment of Joseph Estrada with amendments such as maintaining the silence of the visitors and neutrality among the senators.

== Gutierrez's resignation ==
Gutierrez resigned on April 29, personally handling her resignation letter to President Aquino; the president accepted the ombudsman's resignation. With her resignation, the senate canceled the impeachment trial. The senators thanked the ombudsman for "sparing" the country from a "tedious, divisive, and painful" impeachment process; Senate President Juan Ponce Enrile thanked her as the senate can now concentrate on legislative matters.

== See also ==
- Impeachment of Renato Corona
- First and second impeachment of Sara Duterte
