= Andres Bautista =

Filipino former government official

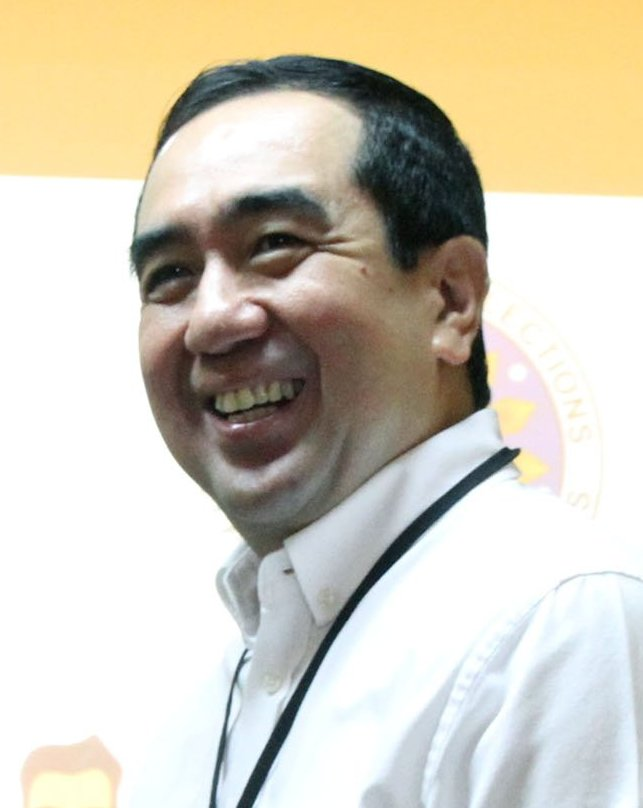
- Bautista in 2017

Chairperson of the Commission on Elections
- In office April 28, 2015 – October 23, 2017
- Appointed by: Benigno Aquino III
- Preceded by: Christian Robert S. Lim (acting); Sixto Brillantes
- Succeeded by: Christian Robert S. Lim (acting); Sheriff Abas

Chairperson of the Presidential Commission on Good Government
- In office September 13, 2010 – April 27, 2015
- Appointed by: Benigno Aquino III
- Preceded by: Camilo Sabio
- Succeeded by: Richard Roger Amurao (Acting)

Personal details
- Born: March 28, 1964 (age 62)
- Spouse: Patricia Cruz (m. 2000, sep. 2013)
- Education: Ateneo de Manila University (B.S. and LL.B); Harvard Law School (LL.M.)
- Occupation: Lawyer; government official; academic administrator

Juan Andres "Andy" Donato Bautista (born March 28, 1964) is a Filipino lawyer and former government official. He served as chairman of the Presidential Commission on Good Government (PCGG) from 2010 to 2015 and then chairman of the Commission on Elections (COMELEC) from 2015 to 2017 in the administration of President Benigno Aquino III. He also previously served as dean of the Far Eastern University Institute of Law.

As COMELEC chairman, Bautista presided over the 2016 general election. During his tenure, COMELEC suffered a data breach 43 days before the election. He also faced allegations of unexplained wealth and acceptance of bribes. Bautista announced his resignation in October 2017 but was nonetheless impeached by the House of Representatives. He then fled to the United States and is being pursued by the National Bureau of Investigation (NBI). In 2023, the United States Department of Homeland Security filed money laundering charges against Bautista for allegedly receiving bribes associated with the 2016 Philippine general election, which were coursed through U.S. accounts. Bautista was also named in the Pandora Papers for having secret offshore wealth.

== Early life and education ==
Bautista was born on March 28, 1964. He earned his Bachelor of Science degree in legal management from Ateneo de Manila University in 1986 and proceeded to earn his Bachelor of Laws from Ateneo Law School as class valedictorian in 1990. He then earned his Master of Laws from Harvard Law School in 1993. While still a law student, Bautista worked as a judicial clerk for Chief Justice Marcelo Fernan from 1989 to 1992.

== Career ==
From 2002 to 2005, Bautista was president of the Philippine Association of Law Schools. He was also a bar reviewer in constitutional law at the National Bar Review Consortium (2003–2008), a lecturer in constitutional law and project finance at the Ateneo Law School and the Far Eastern University Institute of Law, a trustee of the Philippine Judicial Academy, a member of the Supreme Court Committee on Legal Education and Bar Matters, a member of the governing board of the Mandatory Continuing Legal Education Office, vice president for academic affairs of the Philippine Constitution Association, as well as director and corporate secretary of the British Chamber of Commerce.

Bautista was the former dean of the FEU Institute of Law and the Master of Business Administration-Juris Doctor dual degree program of the De La Salle Graduate School of Business and Far Eastern University. Concurrently, he was the chairman of the board of directors of the Makati Shangri-la Plaza Hotel.

In August 2010, Bautista was appointed by President Benigno Aquino III as chairman of the Presidential Commission on Good Government.

In 2012, he was one of the nominees to succeed the impeached Renato Corona as Chief Justice of the Supreme Court of the Philippines.

Bautista is a member of the Consultative Commission on Charter Change, an independent body formed in 2005 by President Gloria Macapagal Arroyo to propose revisions to the 1987 Philippine Constitution.

== Commission on Elections (2015–2017) ==
On April 28, 2015, President Benigno Aquino III signed Bautista's appointment as the new chairman of the Commission on Elections (COMELEC). This appointment played an important role in the 2016 Philippine general election, where many issues and accusations circulated in the media and online social networks about the apparent manipulation of the election results by the Liberal Party, the dominant political party at the time. Following the election, all 6 members of the commission issued a memorandum criticizing Bautista's "failed leadership".

The camp of losing vice-presidential candidate Bongbong Marcos claimed and presented reports of irregularities in the hash code of the data provided by the COMELEC's transparency server. COMELEC explains that this happened as the result of the correction of the character 'Ñ' which did not render properly in the output.

Another accusation claimed by the Marcos camp was the reports of another discrepancy in the data provided by the same transparency server, where the number of votes have been slightly decreased further. Bautista explained that this occurred as the result of their intentional act of removing the "test votes" which were apparently included in the official vote counts by accident, and reported by the transparency server.

In its decision dated December 28, 2016, the National Privacy Commission found the COMELEC guilty of violation of the Data Privacy Act of 2012 for a data breach that led to the leakage of personal data of 1.3 million overseas Filipino voters as well as fingerprints of 15.8 million people and recommended the filing of criminal charges against Bautista under Section 26 of the Act. On March 25, 2021, the Court of Appeals dismissed Bautista's petition for review.

=== Impeachment of Andres Bautista ===
Andres Bautista
- Accused: Andres Bautista, Chairperson of the Commission on Elections
- Proponents: Harry Roque
- Date: 11–23 October 2017
- Outcome: Impeached by the House of Representatives; Bautista resigns from office, subsequently flees to the United States
- Charges: Betrayal of public trust; Culpable violation of the constitution

Impeachment vote by the House of Representatives (October 23, 2017)
- Votes in favor: 137 / 297 (46%)
- Votes against: 75 / 297 (25%)
- Not voting: 2 / 297 (0.7%)
- Result: Impeachment successful

On October 11, 2017, Bautista announced his intention to resign as chairman of the Commission on Elections by the end of the year. Hours after announcing his intent to resign, the House of Representatives voted 137–75–2 to impeach Bautista from the post amid allegations of unexplained wealth. On October 23, President Rodrigo Duterte formally accepted Bautista's resignation. Bautista fled to the United States on November 21, 2017, and refused to return to the Philippines despite a subpoena to attend a Senate probe.

Following a tip from the estranged wife of Bautista, the United States government, through the Department of Homeland Security’s Homeland Security Investigations (HSI), filed money laundering and conspiracy charges against at the United States District Court in the Southern District of Florida on September 19, 2023. His estranged wife, Patricia, claimed Bautista has ill-gotten wealth worth ₱1,000,000,000.

She allegedly received bribes from an unnamed tech company in securing a multimillion-dollar contract related to the 2016 general election. The bribe money was coursed through United States accounts and overseas bank accounts of the tech firm's Taiwan-based vendor. It is known publicly that Smartmatic has been providing the technology infrastructure for the automated elections in the Philippines since 2010.

=== Pandora Papers leak and indictment by the United States ===
Bautista was also included in the Pandora Papers as incorporator of Baumann Enterprises Limited, a company registered in the British Virgin Islands in 2010. Baumann has never been declared in Bautista's Statement of Liabilities, Assets and Net Worth (SALN) from 2010 to 2015.

On August 8, 2024, the United States Department of Justice announced that the Florida US federal grand jury indicted Bautista, including Roger Alejandro Piñate Martinez, a Venezuelan and Florida resident, co-founder of Smartmatic, Elie Moreno and Jose Miguel Velasquez. From 2015 and 2018, Bautista was charged with acceptance of $1 million bribes from the three suspects relating to 2016 Philippine presidential election, in violation of the FCPA, money laundering and international laundering of monetary instruments. The evidence was submitted by the DOJ and the Ombudsman.

Government offices
Preceded by Christian Robert Lim (acting)	COMELEC Chairman; 2015–2018	Succeeded by Sheriff Abas
