= Impeachment of Renato Corona =

2011–2012 Philippine charging of chief justice

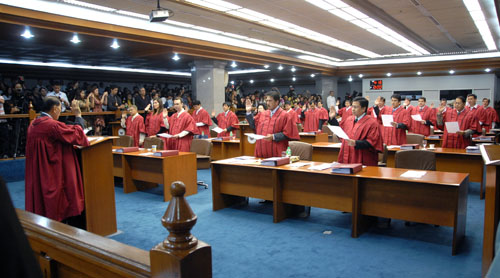
- The Senate of the Philippines convenes as the Impeachment Court
- Accused: Renato Corona (Chief Justice of the Supreme Court of the Philippines)
- Proponents: Risa Hontiveros, Rodolfo Lozada Jr., Juan Carlo Tejano, and Lea Lopez Navarro
- Date: 12 December 2011 – 29 May 2012
- Outcome: Convicted by the Senate of the Philippines and removed from office.
- Charges: Betrayal of public trust; Culpable violation of the constitution; Graft and corruption

Impeachment vote by the House of Representatives (December 12, 2011)
- Votes in favor: 188 / 285 (66%)
- Not voting: 97 / 285 (34%)
- Result: Impeachment successful

Decision by Senate sitting as Impeachment Court (May 29, 2012)
- Votes in favor: 20 / 23 (87%)
- Votes against: 3 / 23 (13%)
- Result: Corona removed and perpetually disqualified from holding of public office.

Renato Corona, the 23rd chief justice of the Supreme Court of the Philippines, was impeached on December 12, 2011. Corona was the third official, after former President Joseph Estrada in 2000 and Ombudsman Merceditas Gutierrez in March 2011, to be impeached by the House of Representatives.

The Senate, convened as an impeachment court, began the impeachment trial on January 16, 2012. This was the second impeachment trial in the history of the Philippines, as Gutierrez had resigned prior to the start of her trial. On May 29, 2012, Corona was found guilty of article two of the articles of impeachment that had been filed against him pertaining to his failure to disclose to the public his statement of assets, liabilities and net worth. He is the first public official who was removed and perpetually disqualified from holding public office.

== Appointment of Corona as chief justice ==
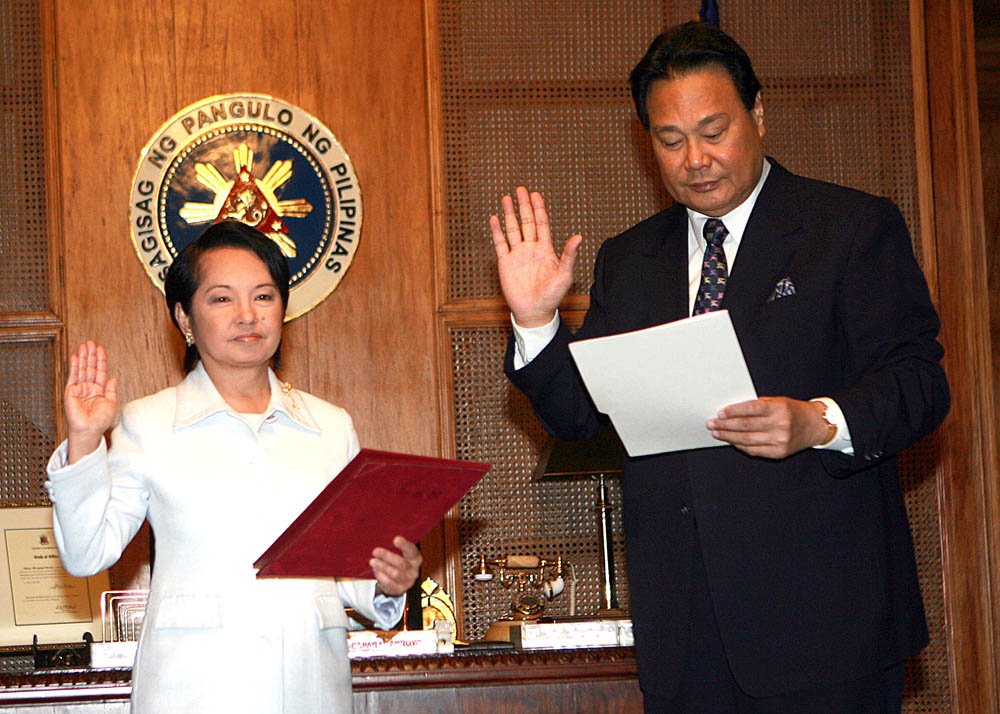
President Gloria Macapagal-Arroyo administers the oath of office to Supreme Court of the Philippines Chief Justice Renato C. Corona at the Malacanang Palace on May 17, 2010.

Chief Justice Reynato Puno was to retire on May 17, 2010, seven days after the presidential election. However, the constitution prohibits President Gloria Macapagal Arroyo from appointing anyone two months before the presidential election up to the end of her term. This caused a suit to be brought to the Supreme Court, in which the high tribunal ruled on March 17, 2010, that the ban on appointments does not cover the judiciary. The court ruled on the case with finality on April 20, 2010, with nine justices concurring, one dissenting and two dismissing the petition for being premature. Chief Justice Puno and Associate Justices Corona and Antonio Carpio abstained from ruling on the case. The court then ordered the Judicial and Bar Council (JBC) to proceed with its nomination process and subsequently submit its shortlist of nominees for the Chief Justice to Arroyo.

Corona was appointed chief justice on May 12, 2010. He was the "most senior" Supreme Court justice among the four nominees of the JBC.

With Benigno Aquino III winning the election, he invited all heads of the three branches of government to his inauguration, although instead of the tradition of him being inaugurated by the chief justice, he instead chose to be sworn in by Associate Justice Conchita Carpio-Morales, the sole dissenter on the case.

== Conflict between Aquino and Corona ==
On December 6, 2011, at the National Criminal Justice Summit at the Manila Hotel, Aquino said in a speech that Corona, who was seated meters away from him, is beholden to Arroyo. Aquino questioned the court's granting of a temporary restraining order lifting the watch list order of the Department of Justice against Arroyo, Arroyo's midnight appointment of Corona, and the ruling of Camarines Sur's two new legislative districts as constitutional despite falling short of the required population set by the Constitution.

== Impeachment ==
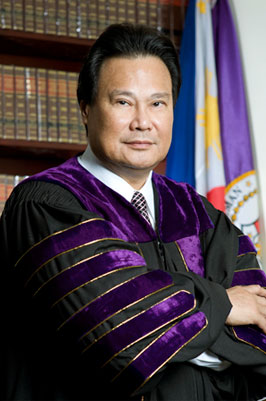
Official portrait of Chief Justice Renato C. Corona

On the December 12, 2011, flag-raising ceremony at the Supreme Court, Corona revealed that there was "a secret plan to oust me from office by any means, fair or foul." Corona said that he would not resign.

Later in the day, a caucus amongst Aquino's allies in the House of Representative was called. Minority leader Edcel Lagman said that discussion amongst Aquino's allies heightened when the Committee on Justice passed an impeachment case involving Associate Justice Mariano del Castillo on his alleged plagiarism. Lagman further said that if the vote passed, he would question its "legal and factual basis." The deputy presidential spokesperson, on the other hand, stated that the Palace "is not privy to the discussions of the Liberal Party in the House."

At the conclusion of the majority bloc's caucus, Committee on Justice chairman Niel Tupas Jr. presented the impeachment complaint; after the presentation, only two representatives asked for more questions, while an overwhelming majority asked to sign the complaint. He said that there were no instructions from the Palace to impeach Corona, nor was the pork barrel of representatives who did not sign would be held back, but he said that he informed the president of their decision to impeach Corona, and that the president supported it. The House of Representatives then voted in session to endorse the complaint, getting 188 votes, well above the one-third (95) of the members required by the Constitution.

Navotas representative Toby Tiangco resigned from the majority bloc, and the chairmanship of the Committee on Metro Manila Development, after the impeachment was passed by the House of Representatives. Tiangco said that the complaint was approved without the members of Congress scrutinizing it. Batangas 2nd District representative Hermilando Mandanas, who did not sign the complaint, was relieved of the chairmanship of the Committee on Ways and Means. Mandanas quoted Speaker Feliciano Belmonte Jr. on saying that the Aquino administration wanted his removal. The majority bloc was not surprised with Tiangco's resignation from the majority, with Majority Leader Neptali Gonzales II describing Tiangco as a "maverick" and has "more than many times identified himself with the minority."

=== Articles of Impeachment ===
These are the Articles of Impeachment against Chief Justice Renato Corona:

#	Case	Violation
1	Partiality and subservience in cases involving the Arroyo administration from the time he was appointed as associate justice to the time of his 'midnight appointment' as chief justice.	Betrayal of public trust
2	Failed to disclose to the public his statement of assets, liabilities and net worth as required under the Constitution.	Betrayal of public trust and/or culpable violation of the constitution
3	Failing to meet and observe the stringent standards under the constitution that provides that "[a] member of the judiciary must be a person of proven competence, integrity, probity, and independence" in allowing the Supreme Court to act on mere letters filed by a counsel which caused the issuance of flip-flopping decisions in final and executory cases; in creating an excessive entanglement with Mrs. Arroyo through her appointment of his wife to office; and in discussing with litigants regarding cases pending before the Supreme Court.	Betrayal of public trust and/or culpable violation of the constitution
4	Blatantly disregarded the principle of separation of powers by issuing a status quo ante order against the House of Representatives in the case concerning the impeachment of then-Ombudsman Merceditas Navarro-Gutierrez.	Betrayal of public trust and/or culpable violation of the constitution
5	Wanton arbitrariness and partiality in consistently disregarding the principle of res judicata in the cases involving the 16 newly created cities, and the promotion of Dinagat Island (sic) into a province.	Betrayal of public trust
6	Arrogating unto himself, and to a committee he created, the authority and jurisdiction to improperly investigate a justice of the Supreme Court for the purpose of exculpating him. Such authority and jurisdiction is properly reposed by the Constitution in the House of Representatives via impeachment.	Betrayal of public trust
7	Partiality in granting a temporary restraining order (TRO) in favor of former president Gloria Macapagal Arroyo and her husband Jose Miguel Arroyo in order to give them an opportunity to escape prosecution and to frustrate the ends of justice, and in distorting the Supreme Court decision on the effectivity of the TRO in view of a clear failure to comply with the conditions of the Supreme Court's own TRO.	Betrayal of public trust
8	Failed and refused to account for the Judiciary Development Fund and Special Allowance for the Judiciary collections.	Culpable violation of the constitution and/or graft and corruption

^* The Prosecution withdrew Articles 1, 4, 5, 6 and 8 on February 29, 2012. The Senate continued to deliberate on Articles 2, 3 and 7.

== Impeachment trial ==
The Senate received the articles of impeachment on December 13. Tupas and Reynaldo Umali delivered the articles of impeachment, with Tupas saying that the process was not railroaded.

Employees of the judiciary staged a court holiday on December 13 in support of Corona; this meant many courts were closed. In a speech delivered in front of Supreme Court employees, Corona branded Aquino as building a dictatorship, stated that he will not quit, and that his conviction will result in Aquino controlling all three branches of government. The Executive replied via Executive Secretary Edwin Lacierda that it was not out to control all branches of government but wanted an independent Supreme Court, told Corona to go on a leave on absence, and that the impeachment is "not an attack on the judiciary. This is a case of accountability against Chief Justice Corona."

=== Legal teams ===
==== Prosecution ====
The prosecution team includes the members of the House of Representatives, who are all members of the majority bloc, with several private prosecutors. Niel Tupas Jr. is the chief of the prosecution team.

Name	Party	District	Article (Primary/secondary)
Raul Daza	Liberal	Northern Samar–1st	1st/2nd
Niel Tupas Jr.	Liberal	Iloilo–5th	None/2nd
Neri Colmenares	Bayan Muna	Party-list	7th/1st
Marilyn Primicias-Agabas	NPC	Pangasinan–6th	2nd/5th
Elpidio Barzaga Jr.	NUP	Dasmariñas	5th/2nd
Giorgidi Aggabao	NPC	Isabela–4th	3rd/8th
Kaka Bag-ao	Akbayan	Party-list	4th/3rd
Reynaldo Umali	Liberal	Oriental Mindoro–2nd	8th/4th
Rodolfo Fariñas	Nacionalista	Ilocos Norte–1st	6th/None
Sherwin Tugna	CIBAC	Party-list	None/3rd, 6th

The prosecutors from the House of Representatives enlisted the help of private practitioners to assist them; this was opposed by the defense, saying that only the prosecutors from the House of Representatives are the "sole prosecutors". The Senate allowed the existence of the private prosecutors citing "matter of rule and precedence". The private prosecutors who are allowed to assist the public prosecutors in impeachment proceedings are:

- Mario Bautista
- Arthur Lim
- Demetrio Custodio
- Jose Benjamin Panganiban
- Clarence Jandoc
- Ernesto Viovicente
- Frederick Vallestero
- Winston Ginez

The prosecution also named representatives Miro Quimbo, Lorenzo Tañada III and Juan Edgardo Angara as their spokespersons.

==== Defense ====
Supreme Court spokesperson Jose Midas Marquez described Corona's defense team as a "powerhouse legal team".

1. Serafin R. Cuevas, former Supreme Court associate justice, trustee of New Era University
2. Jacinto Jimenez, professor at the Ateneo Law School
3. Jose Roy III, former dean and president of the Pamantasan ng Lungsod ng Maynila
4. Eduardo de los Angeles, former dean of the Ateneo Law School
5. German Lichauco II, partner of the Siguion Reyna, Montecillo, Ongsiako law firm
6. Dennis Manalo, partner of the Siguion Reyna, Montecillo, Ongsiako law firm
7. Ramon Esguerra, general counsel of the Integrated Bar of the Philippines
8. Tranquil G.S. Salvador III, former dean of the Pamantasan ng Lungsod ng Pasay
9. Karen Jimeno, formerly of the Quisumbing, Torres, Evangelista firm

Ernesto "Jun" Francisco Jr. quit the defense team for he feared that his previous dealings with Senator Manny Villar will be a reason to question his loyalty to the defense's cause.

=== Opening day ===
The Senate convened as the impeachment court for the first time on December 14. The senators took their oaths before Senate President Juan Ponce Enrile; Enrile was sworn in by Antonio Trillanes, the youngest senator.

=== Holiday recess ===
The next day, the impeachment court served summons to Corona, who was received by the Supreme Court. Four days later, Vicente Millora, a former president of the Integrated Bar of the Philippines (IBP), filed a petition at the Supreme Court questioning the constitutionality of the pending trial, asking for a temporary restraining order (TRO), and to declare the articles of impeachment null and void. Millora contended that the impeachment case did not go through constitutional means as it was passed with "undue haste, railroaded, fast-tracked, and signed but not sworn to by the 188 respondent lawmakers." The prosecutors responded by asking the Supreme Court to dismiss the petition. Additional petitions questioning the constitutionality of the impeachment were filed by Vladimir Cabigao, Danilo Lihaylihay, Oliver Lozano, and Allan Paguia and Homobono Adaza.

The Senate received Corona's answer on December 26 which asked for the Senate to dismiss the case for "failing to meet the requirements of the Constitution." Antonio Carpio, one of the possible replacements for Corona if he is successfully removed, reportedly was assigned the case concerning the constitutionality of the impeachment, with Corona expected to recuse himself from the discussion.

In a press conference, the prosecution team revealed that Corona owns a high-end penthouse condominium unit in Bellagio, Fort Bonifacio, Taguig worth ₱14.51 million in 2009. Tupas asked if this condominium unit is included in Corona's state of assets, liabilities and net worth (SALN), saying that Corona's SALN has been made unavailable to the public. The senators scolded the prosecutors, saying that they are not allowed to discuss the merits of the case so as not to preempt the impeachment trial. This came as an anonymous source disclosed that Corona owned another condominium unit in nearby Bonifacio Ridge worth between ₱5 million and ₱8 million, and a house and lot in Quezon City. The prosecutors agreed to stop issuing statements to the media until the trial's start.

Corona asked the impeachment court for a preliminary hearing; this was the first motion the impeachment court would hear. Meanwhile, the prosecution asked the Senate to subpoena documents on 45 properties allegedly belonging to Corona. Aside from the documents, the prosecution also asked for the appearances of Corona, his wife and children. Quimbo said that "At least 40 of these properties were not declared in Chief Justice Corona's 2002 SALN, the last year when he made such (a) declaration." Corona replied that he owned five pieces of real estate properties, and all appeared on his SALN.

On the other hand, the defense wanted to summon Tupas, Belmonte, Jesus Crispin Remulla, Mandanas, Tiangco and Secretary-General Marilyn Barua-Yap. Ponce Enrile consulted the other senators, asking if they were allowed to summon people connected to the House of Representatives due to "inter-parliamentary courtesy."

=== January ===
==== January 16 ====
On the morning of January 16, the first day the Senate was set to receive the prosecution and defense teams, Corona stated in a speech that "there is no turning back" on the impeachment trial. Corona stated that he did nothing wrong to the president or to the people, that he did not steal from anyone, and that the 45 properties included double entries, properties belonging to his wife and in-laws, and denied the accusation that the World Bank loan was not his responsibility. Corona added that there are people acting in a conspiracy to remove him from office: those who want to prevent the distribution of Hacienda Luisita, a hacienda owned by the family of President Aquino, to its farmer-beneficiaries, a vice presidential candidate who lost the 2010 vice presidential election, and an associate justice who wants to succeed him as chief justice.

The trial started at 2:10 p.m, with Senate President Ponce Enrile, the presiding officer, calling the Senate to order. Two senators, Miriam Defensor Santiago and Loren Legarda, were absent on the first day. Niel Tupas led the public prosecutors in presenting themselves, followed by the private prosecutors, who stated that they are under the complete control of the public prosecutors. Corona's defense also presented themselves, with defense chief Serafin Cuevas presenting Corona at the gallery, and entered a plea of not guilty on behalf of the defendant.

Majority floor leader Tito Sotto moved to tackle the defense's motion for a preliminary hearing. The defense argued that impeachment complaint was "fatally defective" as there was a defect in the verification of the 188 signatures. The presiding officer prohibited Tupas' request allowing private prosecutor Mario Bautista to argue in behalf of the prosecution. Tupas instead was the one who argued for the prosecution, saying that the impeachment complaint was passed according to the rules of the House of Representatives.

Sotto then moved to tackle a motion filed by private lawyer Fernando Perito to cite the prosecution for indirect contempt on their press conference stating that Corona had ill-gotten wealth. The presiding officer also dismissed the request, stating that Perido is not a party to the case. The president officer then requested all parties to refrain from issuing statements relating to the case outside of the impeachment court.

==== January 17 ====
The Senate threw out a motion to subpoena Chief Justice Corona, his wife and family by a vote of 14–6. Initially, the request was decided upon Senate president Ponce Enrile as presiding officer but was contested by Senate minority leader Alan Peter Cayetano citing that there was a need to compel them to testify over allegations that the properties were placed under the names to ill-gotten wealth. Enrile, however said that such a request will forfeit the right of self-incrimination and giving evidence by under duress. Meanwhile, the motion of the defense to deny the appearance of private prosecutors of the prosecution was denied, thereby the prosecution's privilege to retain the use of private prosecutors.

However, the Senate approved subpoenas to the clerk of the Supreme Court Enriqueta Esguerra-Vidal and the register of deeds and land assessors in the cities of Makati, Marikina, Pasay, Parañaque, Quezon City and Taguig, where the alleged properties of Corona are found. The Senate compelled that documents such as the statement of assets, liabilities and net worth, land titles and of the such, be presented to the impeachment court.

The trial was postponed early due to the prosecution's lack of preparation in presenting witnesses to testify the authenticity of documents presented. Cavite Representative Elpidio Barzaga Jr. was to present evidences on the second article. Counsel Serafin Cuevas said that no notice was given to the defense panel to prepare on the second article as the panel was prepared on the manner of the complaint filed.

On the same day, the Supreme Court unanimously deferred its decision on whether to issue a temporary restraining order (TRO) or not to stop the impeachment trial. Five petitions, headed by former Misamis Oriental governor Homobono Adaza were consolidated by the court and required the Senate to comment on the petitions within ten days. Supreme Court spokesperson Jose Midas Marquez said that the court could issue an order at any time and or call for oral arguments. He furthers on that the matter is with the Senate and says the process is ongoing. The petitions were filed due to the alleged railroading of the impeachment complaint against Corona.

==== January 18 ====
Supreme Court clerk of court Enriqueta Esguerra-Vidal, turned over copies of the statements of assets, liabilities and net worth (SALNs) of Chief Justice Corona from the years 2002 to 2010 to the Senate. This was after the constant compelling of senator-judges and the prosecutors. Esguerra-Vidal insisted that she be given permission to release the said documents citing a Supreme Court ruling dated on May 2, 1989; that prohibits "deceptive requests for information" with regard to the release of SALNs of the judiciary. Senate President Ponce Enrile told that she had to comply with the said subpoena and give the said documents to the Senate. Supreme Court spokesperson Jose Midas Marquez would later say that the clerk was not in any legal hurdle as Corona authorized the release of the documents.

Meanwhile, Marianito Dimaandal, head director of the Malacañang Records Office testified and said that SALNs of Chief Justice Corona from 1992 to 2010 exist. As custodian, Dimanadal stated that the SALNs are certified true copies and had attested to their authenticity. Yet, he later said that he was position on the veracity of the contents of the documents.

Defense counsel Cuevas asked the Senate to remove the second article of the complaint. Cuevas said that "The fact alone that there is SALN is proof enough that he has filed and complied with the rules and regulation on the matter, that resolves the problem." Senate president Ponce Enrile clarified that such release of the SALNs is response to the subpoena given to the clerk and doesn't overrule the said article.

The following are the SALNS filed by Chief Justice Corona from 2002 to 2010 with assets declared during those years:

Year of SALN	Date of filing	Assets declared (in terms of PHP)
2002	March 10, 2003	₱14.96 million
2003	April 12, 2004	₱7.359 million
2004	April 25, 2005	₱7.359 million
2005	April 20, 2006	₱8.359 million
2006	September 23, 2007	₱9.559 million
2007	April 11, 2008	₱11.059 million
2008	April 28, 2009	₱12.559 million
2009	April 11, 2010	₱14.559 million
2010	April 29, 2011	₱22.938 million

==== January 19 ====
The prosecution presented Taguig–Pateros Register of Deeds Randy Rutaquio. Rutaquio presented the certificate of title of condominium units at the Bellagio worth ₱14.6 million under the names of Renato and Cristina Corona, and a deed of sale on a Megaworld property sold by the Corona couple to their daughter Ma. Charina. Under cross-examination, Rutaquio said that he was not present when the certificate of title and deed of sale were processed, although these would've gone through him as he passed through the registration of sales.

Senator Alan Peter Cayetano asked the prosecution that if Article II was on Corona's non-disclosure of his SALN, and they did not possess Corona's SALN when they submitted the complaint, how were they able to come up with the complaint; prosecutor Elpidio Barzaga Jr. said the charges were "based on reports". Senator Francis Escudero asked prosecutor Niel Tupas Jr. who wrote the complaints; Tupas answered that it was a collaboration. Escudero said that he was confused since each article must correspond to a singular act, and asked that both prosecution and defense submit a legal memorandum on the matter.

The impeachment court excused Bureau of Internal Revenue (BIR) commissioner Kim Henares as she was not able to bring Corona's tax documents. The prosecution then presented Quezon City acting register of deeds Carlo Alcantara. Alcantata testified that Corona sold his Burgundy property to his daughter Carla Corona-Castillo. Defense counsel Serafin Cuevas told the court that he would cross-examine Alcantara on the next trial day as he would study Alcantara's submitted documents. The prosecution then presented Marikina Register of Deeds Sedfrey Garcia but he was told to return on the next trial day.

==== January 24 ====
While the defense submitted its memorandum regarding Article II, the prosecution failed to submit theirs before the trial began; Presiding Officer Juan Ponce Enrile ordered the prosecution to pass it before the trial starts on the next day. Senator Miriam Defensor Santiago, who has been absent at the trial up to this point, asked both the prosecution and the defense how many witness will they present for the entire trial. When Tupas could not give an answer, Santiago scolded the prosecution, saying that they should "not waste the time of this court." Cuevas stated that they have 15 witnesses and over 20 documents to present.

Tupas then asked Enrile to be "more liberal" in allowing the prosecution to ask questions. Enrile was so offended he offered to resign "if somebody cannot accept his rulings." Tupas said "We just want flexibility to listen to the witnesses." Senator Manuel Villar said that while he believes Enrile was handling the trial well, he can't please everyone. Enrile then approved Santiago's motion asking both the prosecution and defense the exact number of witnesses they will present. Santiago also said that the court should be more liberal in accepting evidence, after what had happened in the impeachment trial of Joseph Estrada where they prevented the opening of the second envelope.

==== January 25 ====
Enrile announced that the court will allow presentation of evidence for paragraphs 2.2 (nondisclosure of SALN) and 2.3 (non-inclusion of properties in the SALN), but not for paragraph 2.4 (alleged ill-gotten wealth) of Article II. The court also allowed the subpoena of the income tax returns of the Corona couple. The prosecution presented BIR Commissioner Kim Henares as their witness although Enrile asked how her testimony will be relevant to the case. In the end, she was allowed to testify although any statement on Corona's ill-gotten wealth will be disallowed. Santiago scolded both the prosecution and defense for long debates.

Private prosecutor Arthur Lim began his direct examination of Henares. The prosecution presented an "alpha list", a document submitted by a company listing its employees, salary, and tax withheld. Enrile allowed the presentation of the Supreme Court's alpha list. Henares stated that the Supreme Court had not kept an alpha list from 2002 to 2005 and gave a testimony on Corona's income and taxes based on the court alpha list from 2006 and 2010 as well as on Corona not having an income tax return. Henares was allowed to present Cristina Corona's income tax return. She testified that Mrs. Corona was a one-time taxpayer for a property transaction on September 9, 2003. Mrs. Corona purchased the property worth 11 million pesos although she had no recorded income that year.

Lim asked if Mrs. Corona was in other alpha lists. The defense objected but Enrile allowed Henares to answer. She testified that Mrs. Corona was in the alpha list of the Camp John Hay Management Corporation where she was the CEO and president. The prosecution presented documents from alleged Corona properties in Taguig, Makati, and Quezon City.

==== January 26 ====
Senator Santiago asked the prosecution on what provisions of the Anti-Graft and Corrupt Practices Act are they charging Corona with. Arthur Lim replied that they are accusing Corona of violating paragraphs (c), (e), and (f) of Section 3 of the law. Santiago answered that these provisions were irrelevant in Article II, since it accuses Corona of not disclosing his SALN. She said that the more appropriate law should have been the Code of Conduct and Ethical Standards for Public Officials and Employees which requires submission of SALN.

The court prohibited all parties to release documents that were merely "marked" as evidence, and cautioned the discussion of the contents of documents. This comes as the income tax returns of the Coronas were brandished on television and on the internet. Senator Escudero asked the court to only cover Corona's acts as chief justice since documents are dated even prior to him becoming one. Enrile replied that the Senate will decide on this on a caucus.

The prosecution continued their direct examination on Henares. She said that the BIR found out that Corona's daughter, Ma. Carla Corona-Castillo, was able to buy an ₱18 million property from her mother Cristina despite only having a monthly taxable income of ₱8,478. Lim asked Henares about the McKinley Hill property in Taguig; she replied that another Corona daughter, Ma. Charina, bought the property from Megaworld Corporation. Henares added that Charina never filed an income tax return, and was a one-time taxpayer, for the McKinley Hill transaction. On the cross-examination, Cuevas asked Henares if the Secretary of Finance told her "durugin mo na si Corona (crush Corona, if possible)." Replies replied "No." Senator Arroyo said that the subsequent investigation of the BIR and the impeachment trial can be "twin moves" against the Coronas.

The senators asked more questions on Henares. Pangilinan questioned if the BIR overlooked other income sources from the Coronas. She replied that the BIR exhausted all efforts, including alpha lists. Cayetano asked if there were any discrepancies with Corona's returns from his SALN; Henares answered that Corona failed to fill up the acquisition cost column, and that Corona included some properties on the next year's SALN instead of the year it was purchased. Henares also said that Corona only had one source of income.

Several senators also cautioned the spokespersons when discussing the merits of the case outside the court. Enrile said "they may discuss the procedure but not the content."

==== January 30 ====
The Senate Secretary, acting as the clerk of court of the Senate sitting as an impeachment court, read the resolution prohibiting the presentation of evidence not related to Corona or to his family, as well as the court's decision not to allow presentation of evidence about Corona's ill-gotten wealth.

Enrile then allowed the prosecutors' motion to present witnesses and evidence on Article III instead of Article I and VII, which was earlier agreed upon. Enrile also allowed the presentation in the articles in the following order: Articles II, III, I, VII, IV, V and VI. Tupas also clarified that they won't present 100 witnesses as earlier reported.

The prosecution presented Megaworld Corporation financial director Giovanni Ng as their witness; he produced the contract to sell on Corona's Bellagio penthouse worth ₱14 million, and the deed of absolute sale of McKinley Hills property to Charina Corona, which was not disclosed in Corona's 2009 SALN. Ng was not able to answer how much was the price of the Bellagio penthouse; private prosecutor Joseph Joemar Perez moved to subpoena Megaworld's senior vice president for marketing on the next hearing. Senator Aquilino Pimentel III asked Perez on why the prosecution was focusing on the cost of the properties, he answered that Ng told them that Corona's 40% discount worth ₱40 million fell under Article III.

When asked by Senator Jinggoy Estrada if Megaworld routinely sells their properties with a discount, Ng said that the company usually gives a 15% discount to buyers who pay on shorter terms; Corona was given a bigger discount since the property needed repairs. Ng, answering a question from Senator Franklin Drilon, said that Charina Corona received a ₱2.3 million discount on the McKinley Hill property. Chief Justice Corona asked the company to put the property under his daughter's name.

Private prosecutor Jose Antonio Hernandez next presented Aniceto Visnar Jr., formerly of the Fort Bonifacio Development Corporation. Visnar told the court that the Corona couple fully paid a ₱9.1 million condominium unit in Bonifacio Ridge in 2005, contrary, as prosecutors say, to Corona's SALN where it states that he bought the aforementioned property in 2004 worth ₱2.3 million. In the cross-examination, defense lawyer Ramon Esguerra said that a notice of acceptance for the Bonifacio Ridge property did not exist, and that Bisnar should be unfamiliar with the property and whether or not Corona's wife sourced the money used to pay for the unit from a loan.

==== January 31 ====
Noli Hernandez, senior vice president of Megaworld, testified that the Bellagio tower purchased by the Corona couple received a steep reduction in its price after a typhoon struck the property while it is being constructed; Megaworld reduced the price from ₱24 million to ₱19.6 million. The senators asked the connection between Corona's purchase of the property, and Article II of the articles of impeachment; prosecutor Elpidio Barzaga Jr. replied that the Corona's purchase of the property was not included in his SALN. Senator Sergio Osmeña III asked Hernandez to produce proof of the damage, while Senator Kiko Pangilinan asked Hernandez to submit to the Senate the engineer's report.

=== February ===
==== February 1 ====
Securities and Exchange Commission (SEC) Director Benito Cataran testified on Corona's ₱11 million loan from his wife's Basa-Guidote Enterprises, Inc. (BGEI) in 2003. Cataran said that the SEC revoked BGEI's articles of incorporation and considered the company as dissolved in 2003. after it did not file general information sheets to the SEC from 1991 to 1997. Enrile countered that the corporation can't be considered as dissolved as it still has to undergo liquidation, and that the SEC can't dissolve corporations; its own stockholders or the government can do that. The senators commented that corporations that are suspended by the SEC can still lend money, and can still be sued.

Ayala Land assistant vice president Nerissa Josef testified on the Corona family's purchase of property at the Columns condominium in Makati. She said that the Coronas paid three installments within one year, in 2004. The prosecution noted that Corona, who only included the property in his 2010 SALN, should have included it starting from his 2004 SALN, on the year when the deed of absolute sale was issued. However, the defense countered that the Coronas refused the property due to defects, and that the Coronas only started possessing the property in 2008.

==== February 2 ====
Carlo Alcantara and Sedfrey Garcia were cross examined; the former was asked about the Coronas' properties in Quezon City, while the latter on their properties in Marikina. The prosecution and defense then argued on whether wrong entries in SALN constituted betrayal of public trust, with Tupas quoting Joaquin Bernas, saying that "betrayal of public trust" was a "catch-all phrase" covering offenses that may not even amount to crimes.

The senators asked the prosecution on how many properties the Coronas really have. The prosecution said that the list given to them by the Land Registration Authority had 45 items, but they were not bound to abide by those. Senator Jinggoy Estrada asked on the prosecution's release of the list to the media, but the prosecution said they did not.

Burgundy Realty Corporation Vice President Gregg Gregonia testified that the Coronas had bought a condominium unit and a parking lot at One Burgundy Plaza in Quezon City in October 2000. Upon query upon the purpose of Gregonia's testimony, the prosecution said that Corona did not timely disclose the property on SALN.

==== February 6 ====
Enrile, despite objections from the defense, allowed Bureau of Internal Revenue (BIR) commissioner Kim Henares to testify. Henares produced the income tax returns of Constantino T. Castillo III, Corona's son-in-law to his daughter Carla. The prosecution explained the connection with Castillo's tax returns and the case, saying that the Castillo couple did not have the financial resources to buy the property for P18 million from the Corona couple. Henares also said that the BIR was in the process of investigating Corona. The defense asked her if Corona can correct the SALNs as per civil service rules; she said that Corona can't, since they were under oath, and that filing SALNs would've been useless. The prosecution asked Henares on Corona's under-declarations in his SALNs as compared to his tax returns; she enumerated properties that were not listed, and discrepancies in net worth.

The Senate then issued a subpoena on Corona's bank records, ordering the managers of Philippine Savings Bank (PSBank)'s Katipunan branch and Bank of the Philippine Islands (BPI) Ayala branch to testify on February 8. The Senate based their subpoenas from documents submitted by the prosecution. Senator Francis Escudero asked where did these come from, as possession of these documents was a violation of the Bank Secrecy Law; House prosecutor Reynaldo Umali said that a "small lady" handed the documents to him. Majority leader Tito Sotto ordered the Senate sergeant-at-arms to review the CCTV to identify the "small lady".

==== February 7 ====
The prosecution proceeded to present the third article of impeachment: Corona's alleged "flip-flopping" on Supreme Court cases. The prosecution first presented Roberto Anduiza, president of the Flight Attendants and Stewards Association of the Philippines (FASAP), which had sued Philippine Airlines for laying off its members while on strike. Anduiza said that Corona participated from the deliberations even if Supreme Court spokesperson Midas Marquez earlier said that the Chief Justice was recusing. Anduiza told the court that FASAP originally won the case at the National Labor Relations Commission, but Philippine Airlines elevated the case up to the Supreme Court. In 2008, the court ordered Philippine Airlines to reinstate crew members who were laid off. However, in 2011, the court reversed its ruling after Philippine Airlines lawyer Estelito Mendoza wrote to Corona. Anduiza said that while Corona recused in 2008, he was not among those who did not participate in the 2011 deliberations.

Senator Jinggoy Estrada asked House prosecutor Rodolfo Fariñas on why he did not sign the impeachment complaint; Fariñas replied that he was a "slow reader", and that the 188 representatives who signed were "speed readers", and that his signature was no longer needed. Fariñas then discussed with Enrile on how the House of Representatives' impeachment process works, and that the House of Representatives and the Senate are working together to oust Corona.

==== February 8 ====
Corona filed a petition for certiorari that sought the Supreme Court to issue a temporary restraining order on the impeachment trial, citing grave abuse of discretion by the Senate. In a separate petition, Corona asked for the recusal of Associate Justices Maria Lourdes Sereno and Antonio Carpio, who had been publicly against Corona, and a special raffle on the case. Corona, on his first petition, also asked the court to prohibit the implementation of the Senate's subpoena to the bank managers, and to prevent them from testifying and submitting documents; he also asked to stop the presentation of evidence pertaining to paragraphs 2.3 and 2.4 on the article alleging his ill-gotten wealth, and that to declare the impeachment complaint null and void ab initio, and that to make permanent the previous temporary restraining order.

PSBank also petitioned the Supreme Court to prevent them from testifying as it is against the Foreign Currency Deposits Act to publicize bank accounts on foreign currencies.

At the start of session, Senator TG Guingona said that the Senate, as an impeachment court, has the sole power to try impeachment cases, and that the Supreme Court should not interfere with the impeachment trial. Meanwhile, Senator Pia Cayetano admonished Fariñas on his remarks the previous day, and that senators' and the house prosecutors' functions are different, as long as the impeachment trial is concerned. Enrile then cautioned the participants or else the Senate will impose its power to maintain order; Fariñas apologizes for his remarks.

After a caucus discussing the petitions filed in the Supreme Court, the Senate deny the motions to defer the subpoenas to PSBank and BPI, and to defer presentation in the FASAP case. Serafin Cuevas then cross examines Roberto Anduiza; after the cross examination, Senator Loren Legarda asks how the FASAP case is connected to the Article III. House prosecutor Kaka Bag-ao says yes.

The defense objects to the presentation of the PSBank manager, citing the petition filed in the Supreme Court. Enrile rules that since there is no temporary restraining order, the Senate can proceed. The prosecution presents PSBank president Pascual Garcia III, with private prosecutor Demetrio Custodio stating the purpose of illustrating that Corona owns ten accounts. Garcia only brought peso accounts; he argues that if he exposes any dollar accounts, it will also expose him and his bank to criminal liability. After a discussion, Enrile orders Custodio to submit a letter detailing the reasons why he should not be cited for contempt, and ordered him to return the next day.

The Senate then reads the decision on issuing subpoenas to Supreme Court justices asked by the prosecution. The Senate denied the motions, citing confidentiality on the Supreme Court's decisions, and on the separation of powers doctrine.

==== February 9 ====
Cuevas and Guingona argued on the Supreme Court's jurisdiction in the impeachment trial held at the Senate. Cuevas said that Guingona's statement two days earlier implied that the Senate, as an impeachment court, is higher than the Supreme Court; he stated that "impeachment procedures are still subject to SC's power of review." Guingona countered that the Supreme Court can't impose its will since the Senate "is not a co-equal branch" when it is sitting as an impeachment court.

After explaining that Annabel Tiongson, the PSBank Katipunan branch manager, was "stressed", Pascual Garcia III decided that it was himself who will testify. Senator Estrada asked if the Tiongson was a "small lady"; Garcia replied that Tiongson is a tall woman. Garcia also replied that his bank did not leak Corona's bank records. He also answered that all five account numbers in the subpoena existed in that PSBank branch. Estrada also asked what "PEP" and "K" meant on the bank records; Garcia answered that "PEP" meant "politically exposed person", but he refused to answer what "K" on "700k" meant, saying that as an annotation to a photocopied document, he can not say that it was bank-sourced "original document."

BPI Ayala branch manager Leonora Dizon testified that Corona owns a checking account, and had an ending balance of more than ₱12 million as of December 2010.

==== February 13 ====
The Senators demanded an explanation upon the defense when they accused Executive Secretary Pacquito Ochoa bribed the senators ₱100 million each to vote on a resolution against the Supreme Court's temporary restraining order on Corona's dollar accounts. Defense lawyer Judd Roy apologized to the Senate and emphasized that there was no malice in their statements. Senator Estrada dared the defense to reveal their source, and Senator Antonio Trillanes ordered them to write an explanation on why they should not be cited for contempt. The Senate then announced that they voted 13–10 to uphold the Supreme Court's restraining order.

PSBank branch manager Annabelle Tiongson said that the bank records previously presented that were supposedly from their bank were fake and did not come from PSBank. Majority floor leader Tito Sotto said, quoting a report from the Sergeant-at-Arms, that no small lady was seen from their CCTV; Enrile then gave the prosecution 24 hours to explain how they acquired the bank records.

==== February 14 ====
Senate President Enrile stated that the Supreme Court had no jurisdiction upon the impeachment trial; he also assumed responsibility for the issuance of the subpoena that was based on the prosecution's supposedly fake bank records. The senators scolded the prosecution for using allegedly spurious bank documents to issue subpoenas. The prosecution replied that they could not vouch for the authenticity of the bank documents.

The defense pointed out that several senators were acting as private prosecutors. Enrile replied that it is up to the senators if they want to ask the witness questions. Both the prosecution and the defense called for an early dismissal to celebrate Enrile's 88th birthday; it was approved without objections.

==== February 15 ====
Upon asking questions on Annabelle Tiongson, the PSBank branch manager; Senator Estrada said that Tiongson's cousin was the running mate of Tupas' brother in 2010. Tiongson answered that she does not know Tupas, and that she didn't care about the politics of her relatives; Tupas also denied knowing the PSBank branch manager. Answering another question from Estrada, Tiongson said that the allegedly fake bank documents may have been retrieved from other sources. Tiongson, upon query from Senator Franklin Drilon, said that while the bank documents used PSBank's standard form, some entries have been altered. Enrile then ordered PSBank President Pascual Garcia III to bring PSBank's original copies of the bank records, but only covering details that are not covered by the restraining order.

==== February 16 ====
PSBank president Pascual Garcia III testified that information derived from the bank documents submitted by the prosecution as "authentic", although some of the information are different. Three of the bank accounts, Estrade noted, were closed on December 12, 2011, the day Corona was impeached.

Senator Loren Legarda asked Tiongson on how the copies of the bank records were leaked; the latter denied divulging it to anyone but said that Quezon City representative Jorge Banal asked for her assistance. She said that Banal went to the PSBank branch carrying the documents and he asked for her guidance; Banal explained that he went to the bank to ask for assistance on what "$700K" meant. The Senate ordered Banal to return to the court on the next session day.

==== February 20 ====
PSBank president Pascual Garcia III testified that the Bangko Sentral ng Pilipinas (BSP; the central bank) and the Anti-Money Laundering Council (AMLC) audited several accounts in that branch, including Corona's. Garcia said that in order form to follow the Anti-Money Laundering Act, they should label accounts from people such as politicians and government appointees in high positions; this caused them to classify Corona's account under "PEP" or politically-exposed person.

However, Senator Teofisto Guingona III said that the AMLC denied having audited Corona's account. Garcia then said that the AMLC specialist just checked if the accounts were properly labeled, and did not check on the balances. Senator Jinggoy Estrada still maintained that he believes that the prosecution-submitted bank record was authentic, alleging that the AMLC photocopied one of the signature cards.

Annabelle Tiongson returned to the witness stand and told the court how Representative Jorge Banal approached her; she was shocked that Banal possessed what resembled the bank's security cards. She then arranged to check if the original documents were still in the vault. Senator Miriam Defensor Santiago noted that whoever got possession of the bank records must explain how he/she could have gotten hold of them.

==== February 21 ====
BPI submitted evidence to the Senate pertaining to Corona's bank records worth ₱12 million as of 2010. The Senate prohibited BPI assistant manager Mara Arcilla since the Senate only requested for the records. Tupas then informed the court that the prosecution had finished presenting witnesses for the second article of impeachment.

After an objection from the defense, Enrile disallowed the prosecution to present a witness from Philippine Airlines who would've testified on the Corona couple's allegedly benefits received from the airline, saying that the testimony would expand the scope of the third article. However, private prosecutor Marlon Manuel was still able to put on record that the Corona couple were given Platinum Cards by Philippine Airlines; this enabled them to travel on first class for free; defense counsel Serafin Cuevas objected to Manuel's statements but Enrile allowed it to remain.

==== February 22 ====
House prosecutor Giorgidi Aggabao informed the court that they will drop from Article III the charges that Corona's independence was compromised when his wife Cristina accepted an appointment to the board of the Camp John Hay Development Corporation, but they will retain the alleged flip-flopping by Corona on the FASAP vs. Philippine Airlines case.

Secretary of Justice Leila de Lima testified that Corona had influenced the court in allowing the temporary restraining order relieving the prohibition of former president Gloria Macapagal Arroyo to leave the country. Using the dissenting opinion by associate justice Maria Lourdes Sereno, de Lima said that Corona corrected the draft of the decision, and instructed Supreme Court spokesperson Midas Marquez to mislead the public by stating that the restraining order was still in effect even if Arroyo was not able to abide by it.

Cuevas questioned de Lima's authority in superseding a decision of the Supreme Court, as only the Supreme Court has the power to interpret the law. De Lima ignored the restraining order issued by the Supreme Court and ordered Arroyo to be blocked at Ninoy Aquino International Airport. The defense argued that the Supreme Court decision was not solely an action of Corona, as there were other seven other justices who concurred with him.

==== February 23 ====
Enrile ordered the court to disregard portions of de Lima's testimony, retaining only the portion of de Lima's narration of Sereno's dissent. House prosecutor Raul Daza stated that Corona favored Arroyo in about 80% of the cases, and that they separated Article I and VII since there were still pending cases in the Supreme Court that are included in Article I.

==== February 27 ====
Enrile announced that Senator Antonio Trillanes withdrew his motion to send questions to Associate Justice Maria Lourdes Sereno via the mail, and that he disallowed the prosecution's motion on allowing the Philippine Airlines official to testify.

Enrile asked the prosecution to invite Justice Sereno instead of summoning her, as the Senate had already voted not to issue subpoenas on Supreme Court justices, with Senator Francis Escudero adding that it is the prosecution's job to present its witnesses, and they should not rely on the Senate's summoning powers.

The prosecutors called former president Gloria Macapagal Arroyo's doctor at the St. Luke's Medical Center to the witness stand to confirm if Arroyo's medical certificate was valid, which was later used by the Supreme Court to allow the Arroyo couple to leave the country for medical reasons. They then had a direct examination on Emma Abanador, the Office of the Vice President's administrative officer. This is for establishing that Corona had already established ties with Arroyo even when she was serving as Vice President, and prior his appointment to the Supreme Court. The final prosecution witness was ABS-CBN cameraman Edmond Losalla who authenticated the raw videos of the Supreme Court's November 15, 2011, press conference that allowed the Arroyos to leave the country, and an interview to Arroyo lawyer Ferdinand Topacio. The defense argued that Losalia's testimony was irrelevant to the case.

==== February 28 ====
The Iglesia ni Cristo held their Grand Evangelical Mission at Rizal Park, causing massive traffic jams. This also caused some of the defense lawyers to be tardy at the trial; the Senate allowed the trial to start at a later time in order for the entire defense team to be present. Later, the Supreme Court issued an order preventing its employees from testifying at the impeachment trial, saying that it is not waving its judicial privilege. This bars two of its process servers that served the restraining order to the Justice Department from testifying. Enrile respected the court's ruling, but will tackle the issue on a caucus the following week to determine their next course of action.

At the Senate, after the prosecution had presented witnesses and evidence for Articles 2, 3 and 7, House prosecutor Niel Tupas Jr. announced that they will drop five articles of impeachment, with the reservation that they can present evidence on Corona's dollar bank accounts once they receive a favorable decision from the Supreme Court; this meant they will no longer present witnesses and evidence pertaining to Articles 1, 4, 5, 6 and 8, and that the defense will be able to present their case; Enrile requested the prosecution to make a formal offer before the Senate considers their request.

==== February 29 ====
Senator Miriam Defensor Santiago scolded the prosecution for withdrawing five articles, saying that they should not have bragged about their victory, and labeling those who were bragging about the strength of the case as "gago" (idiots). Vitaliano Aguirre, a private prosecutor, would cover his ears after the latter's tirade against the prosecution. House prosecutor Rodolfo Fariñas later successfully asked the Senate to remove the word "gago" from the records. Tupas then said that they would no longer pursue the testimony of Justice Maria Lourdes Sereno, and they would rest the case with reservation. When Senator Francis Escudero asked Tupas on whether the dropping of the articles of impeachment constitutes an amendment of the complaint, and whether the 188 signatories were consulted, Tupas said that there was no consultation, although they told the Speaker Feliciano Belmonte Jr. about it. The defense said that they will still present evidence on the five dropped articles, and ask the Senate to acquit Corona on those. Enrile gave the prosecution until March 2 to submit a formal offer to drop those five articles.

Senator Jinggoy Estrada asked who the prosecutor was who had covered his ears while Santiago was scolding them; it was identified as private prosecutor Vitaliano Aguirre II (he would become Justice Secretary four years later). When asked for the reason, Aguirre said that, for the first time forty years, it was the first time he saw a judge lecture the prosecution in court. The Senate later cited Aguirre for contempt, and House prosecutor Fariñas apologized on behalf of the prosecution. Enrile adjourned the trial until March 12.

=== March ===
==== Break ====
The Senate postponed the trial for a week to let the defense prepare for their presentation, and for the prosecution to make an offer of evidence. Tupas asked the court to allow them to make a final offer of their evidence, which was granted. The Senate was to decide on the prosecution's offer by March 8 with the trial to resume on March 12.

Both Enrile and House of Representatives deputy minority leader Danilo Suarez expressed their preferences for Corona to testify. The prosecution pointed out that Corona cannot be able to explain how he acquired the alleged ₱31 million wealth.

On March 2, the prosecution formally offered its evidence to the Senate Cuevas also said that Corona won't testify at the trial, saying that "the members of the impeachment court can examine him on all angles and Justice Cuevas cannot object."

On March 5, the Senate voted to accept peso bank records as evidence in the trial; the next day, the court voted to dismiss the defense's motion to suppress evidence related to Corona's PSBank account, and to simply admonish instead of punishing private prosecutor Aguirre after he was cited for contempt.

Corona then had a media blitz on March 8, when he gave live interviews on TV and radio stations; this was the first time he spoke after the trial started. In an interview at GMA's morning show Unang Hirit, he said that he lost confidence in PSBank, citing PSBank clients saying that his account details had been leaked, causing him to withdraw all of his deposits at its Katipunan Avenue branch. In the same interview, he also cited the Supreme Court's ruling on the Hacienda Luisita, which ruled that the farmers should possess the lands, instead of the current owners, which are family members of President Aquino. The prosecution found Corona's explanation on the PSBank withdrawal as "incredible."

==== March 12 ====
The court voted to accept the prosecution's offer of evidence, and doesn't entertain any motion on the articles that were dropped by the prosecution. The defense presented Navotas Representative Toby Tiangco, one of the congressmen that did not sign the impeachment complaint. Tiangco testified that the impeachment complaint was meant to "control or scare" the Supreme Court. He narrated that Speaker Feliciano Belmonte Jr., in a caucus on December 12, said that Corona should be impeached due to his closeness with Representative Gloria Macapagal Arroyo. He related that he almost signed the complaint, but hesitated as he was not able to read the complaint in full.

The Senate then voted to deny the defense's motion to discuss the complaint's validity, as Corona was notified by the Senate of the trial, and the chief justice replied at the notification. The Senate also voted to cite defense lawyer Jose Roy III in indirect contempt on his earlier statement that the president urged the senators not to honor the Supreme Court's order preventing them from scrutinizing the chief justice's dollar accounts.

==== March 13 ====
Tiangco ends his testimony after Senator Miriam Defensor Santiago asks him on his motives in testifying at the trial. The court then hears the testimony of Araceli Bayuga. She discusses alpha lists in the Supreme Court's tax records. The next witness, Demetrio Vicente, bought from the Coronas one of the properties that is cited on the complaint. Vicente related the circumstances of how he was not able to change the name of the owner of the title from Corona's wife to him.

==== March 14 ====
In her cross examination, Araceli Bayuga notes that Supreme Court justices are not required to liquidate their allowances; all they had to do is to submit a certification. She added that allowances are not taxed. Senators Antonio Trillanes and Alan Peter Cayetano expressed apprehensions on Bayuga's testimony, saying that the scope is within Article 2.4 which was already disallowed by the Senate. Cuevas replied that Bayuga's testimony was only "preliminary". The defense then presented the secretaries of electoral tribunals in Congress in which Corona was a member, which gave him earnings of five million pesos per year.

==== March 15 ====
Bayuga's cross examination continued. Bayuga is asked about the alpha list of the Supreme Court's payroll. She is then discharged. The next witness, Roberto Villaluz, the officer-in-charge (OIC) of the Taguig City Assessor's Office was asked to prove on Corona's financial statements. The senators asks questions on fair market values of real properties. Enrile interrupts the discussion, and reminds that the issue is whether Corona was truthful on his financial statements. Villaluz is then discharged; the next witness is Rodolfo Ordanes, OIC of the Quezon City Assessor's Office. Drilon manifests that since the witness would just be marking documents, the process should expedited. Ordanes is not cross-examined and is discharged once he finished marking the documents.

==== March 16–18 ====
After the Thursday session, the senators had differing opinions on the legality of Corona's financial statements. Bongbong Marcos said that the absence of the acquisition cost was "not questionable"; Edgardo Angara thought that public officials were given the choice on either "put the acquisition cost or the fair market value or the assessed value." Recto stated that the "usual practice" was to put the acquisition cost, while Antonio Trillanes noted that "the acquisition cost is the basis of the computation for the total assets."

Corona's defense team stated that they will present financial statements of other government officials to denote what the "common practice" is. The prosecutors disapproved of the plan, saying that Corona cannot compare himself to other government officials since as Chief Justice, he should be held up to a higher standard than other public officers.

==== March 19 ====
Four witnesses were presented by the defense. The city assessor of Makati, the registers of deeds of Quezon City and Taguig, and the property manager of The Columns property in Makati. Carlo Alcantara, the acting register of deeds of Quezon City, testified on Corona's Ayala Heights and La Vista properties that were transferred to other people. The Ayala Heights property, which cost 8 million pesos, was owned by Corona's wife, and was transferred to a certain Rodel Rivera and his wife. The La Vista property, which cost ₱18 million, was transferred by the Corona couple to their daughter Maria Clara. Alcantara also provided other transfers of the Corona couple's properties in Quezon City, which cost a combined ₱25.5 million, to Maria Clara's husband. Randy Rotaquio, the property manager of The Columns, testified that the alleged properties of the Corona couple were actually registered under their daughter, Maria Charina.

==== March 20 ====
The defense presented Land Registration Authority (LRA) Administrator Eulalio Diaz III; Diaz testified that he provided Niel Tupas Jr., the lead prosecutor, the list of 45 properties that the Corona couple and their children were said to own. However, Diaz later said most of the properties on the list either no longer belonged to the Corona couple, or were never registered under the couple's names. The senators then chastised the prosecution panel and Diaz. When asked on how this happened, Diaz replied that the list was "computer-generated". Tupas denied that the prosecution misled the public, saying "We have every reason to believe the authenticity of these documents." Diaz, upon further questions from Loren Legarda, admitted that the LRA also included in the search the names of Corona's wife and children; that's how the LRA came up with a list of 45 properties.

==== March 21 ====
The prosecution maintains that Corona owns 21 of the 45 properties submitted by the LRA; the prosecution included in the 21 properties the properties that are named under the Corona children but were allegedly actually owned by Corona. Miriam Defensor Santiago accused LRA administrator Diaz of violating the Civil Code of the Philippines, and said that both Diaz and the prosecution may be guilty of "gross negligence". Jinggoy Estrada then asked Diaz if he was willingly aiding the prosecution or simply made a mistake; Diaz replied "I won't accept that I'm in cahoots with prosecution. I also can't readily accept I made a mistake." When Bongbong Marcos asked Diaz on why he made the list, he said he was following the prosecution's orders. Loren Legarda told Diaz that he earlier said to Senator Santiago that he had no knowledge that it will be used in the impeachment trial; Diaz answered that he knew that the list would be used.

==== March 22 ====
The defense presents Miriam Monsuela of the John Hay Management Corporation (JHMC). The prosecution objects to the witness, saying that her testimony, which would be about Cristina Corona's earnings while employed by the JHMC, is immaterial; the court allowed her to testify. Lito Atienza, the former mayor of Manila, was the defense's next witness. The former mayor recalled the transaction involving a piece of property between the city government and Basa-Guidote Enterprises, Inc. (BGEI), the defense says Mrs. Corona was authorized to act in lieu of BGEI. Atienza testified that the sale, which cost the city ₱34,703,800 was legal. Upon questioning by Franklin Drilon, the senator said that there is a "lack of due diligence" on part of the city government on the purchase.

=== Summer recess ===
Journalist Raissa Robles released on a blog a list of properties in the United States the Coronas allegedly lived at. Corona countered that the California property was an apartment used by his daughters on their physical therapy career in the U.S., and that the Florida property was owned by a family friend; Corona concluded that they didn't own any property in the U.S.

=== May ===
==== May 29 ====
The senators cast their votes whether the Chief Justice is guilty or not guilty on the impeachment case. Unlimited time was given to explain their votes. Senators Edgardo Angara, Alan Peter Cayetano, Pia Cayetano, Franklin Drilon, Francis Escudero, Jinggoy Estrada, TG Guingona, Gregorio Honasan, Panfilo Lacson, Lito Lapid, Loren Legarda, Serge Osmeña, Kiko Pangilinan, Koko Pimentel, Ralph Recto, Bong Revilla, Tito Sotto, Antonio Trillanes, Manny Villar and Senate President/Presiding Officer Juan Ponce Enrile voted for conviction. Most of them cited non-disclosure of property as a reason for conviction. While three senators, Senators Joker Arroyo, Miriam Defensor Santiago and Bongbong Marcos voted for acquittal. After Senator Enrile explained his vote, he later summarized the votes as follows, "The Senate, sitting as an impeachment court, having tried Chief Justice Renato Corona, upon three articles of impeachment charged against him by the House of Representatives, by a guilty vote of 20 senators, has found him guilty of the charge under Article II. Now therefore, be it adjudged that Renato Corona, is hereby convicted of the charge against him in Article II of the Articles of impeachment, so ordered."

=== Decision ===
The Senate gave its decision on May 29, 2012. The following table reflects the decision of each senator. Only the 2nd, 3rd and 7th articles were considered; after the required two-thirds vote to remove from office was reached on the first article being voted upon, the Senate decided not to pursue voting on the last two articles.

Senator	Party	Bloc	Article of Impeachment							
Senator	Party	Bloc	1st	2nd	3rd	4th	5th	6th	7th	8th
Edgardo Angara	LDP	Majority	—N/a	Guilty	—N/a	—N/a	—N/a	—N/a	—N/a	—N/a
Joker Arroyo	Lakas	Minority	—N/a	Not guilty	—N/a	—N/a	—N/a	—N/a	—N/a	—N/a
Alan Peter Cayetano	Nacionalista	Minority	—N/a	Guilty	—N/a	—N/a	—N/a	—N/a	—N/a	—N/a
Pia Cayetano	Nacionalista	Minority	—N/a	Guilty	—N/a	—N/a	—N/a	—N/a	—N/a	—N/a
Miriam Defensor Santiago	PRP	Majority	—N/a	Not guilty	—N/a	—N/a	—N/a	—N/a	—N/a	—N/a
Franklin Drilon	Liberal	Majority	—N/a	Guilty	—N/a	—N/a	—N/a	—N/a	—N/a	—N/a
Francis Escudero	Independent	Majority	—N/a	Guilty	—N/a	—N/a	—N/a	—N/a	—N/a	—N/a
Jinggoy Estrada	UNA	Majority	—N/a	Guilty	—N/a	—N/a	—N/a	—N/a	—N/a	—N/a
TG Guingona	Liberal	Majority	—N/a	Guilty	—N/a	—N/a	—N/a	—N/a	—N/a	—N/a
Gregorio Honasan	UNA	Majority	—N/a	Guilty	—N/a	—N/a	—N/a	—N/a	—N/a	—N/a
Panfilo Lacson	Independent	Majority	—N/a	Guilty	—N/a	—N/a	—N/a	—N/a	—N/a	—N/a
Lito Lapid	Lakas	Majority	—N/a	Guilty	—N/a	—N/a	—N/a	—N/a	—N/a	—N/a
Loren Legarda	NPC	Majority	—N/a	Guilty	—N/a	—N/a	—N/a	—N/a	—N/a	—N/a
Bongbong Marcos	Nacionalista	Majority	—N/a	Not guilty	—N/a	—N/a	—N/a	—N/a	—N/a	—N/a
Serge Osmeña	Independent	Majority	—N/a	Guilty	—N/a	—N/a	—N/a	—N/a	—N/a	—N/a
Kiko Pangilinan	Liberal	Majority	—N/a	Guilty	—N/a	—N/a	—N/a	—N/a	—N/a	—N/a
Koko Pimentel	PDP–Laban	Majority	—N/a	Guilty	—N/a	—N/a	—N/a	—N/a	—N/a	—N/a
Ralph Recto	Liberal	Majority	—N/a	Guilty	—N/a	—N/a	—N/a	—N/a	—N/a	—N/a
Bong Revilla	Lakas	Majority	—N/a	Guilty	—N/a	—N/a	—N/a	—N/a	—N/a	—N/a
Tito Sotto	NPC	Majority	—N/a	Guilty	—N/a	—N/a	—N/a	—N/a	—N/a	—N/a
Antonio Trillanes	Nacionalista	Majority	—N/a	Guilty	—N/a	—N/a	—N/a	—N/a	—N/a	—N/a
Manny Villar	Nacionalista	Majority	—N/a	Guilty	—N/a	—N/a	—N/a	—N/a	—N/a	—N/a
Juan Ponce Enrile	UNA	Majority	—N/a	Guilty	—N/a	—N/a	—N/a	—N/a	—N/a	—N/a
Votes needed to convict			16							
Voted "Guilty"			—N/a	Yes 20	—N/a	—N/a	—N/a	—N/a	—N/a	—N/a
Voted "Not guilty"			—N/a	3	—N/a	—N/a	—N/a	—N/a	—N/a	—N/a
Total votes			23							

There were no absences or abstentions.

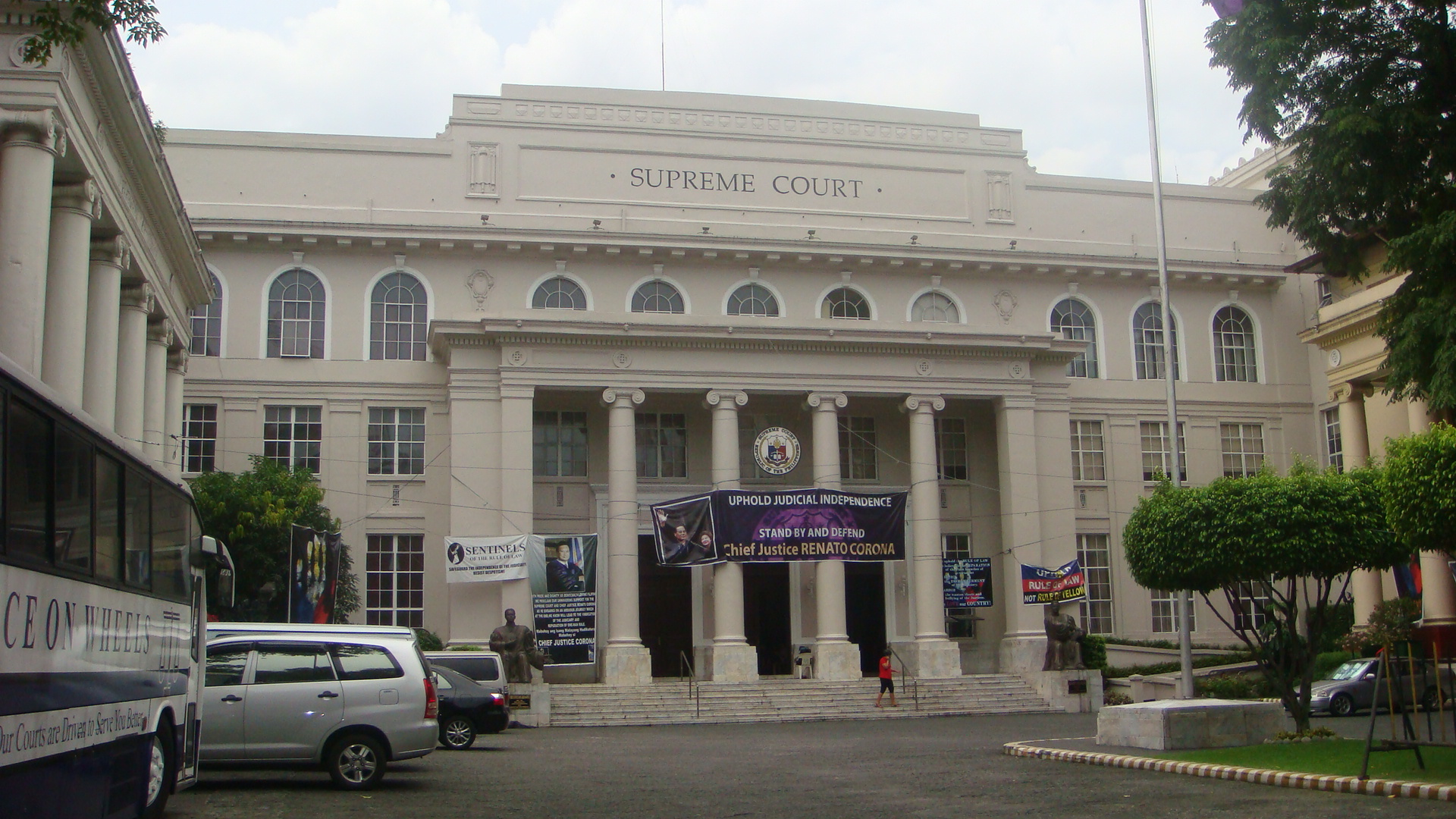
Supreme Court of the Philippines with the Impeachment tarpaulin

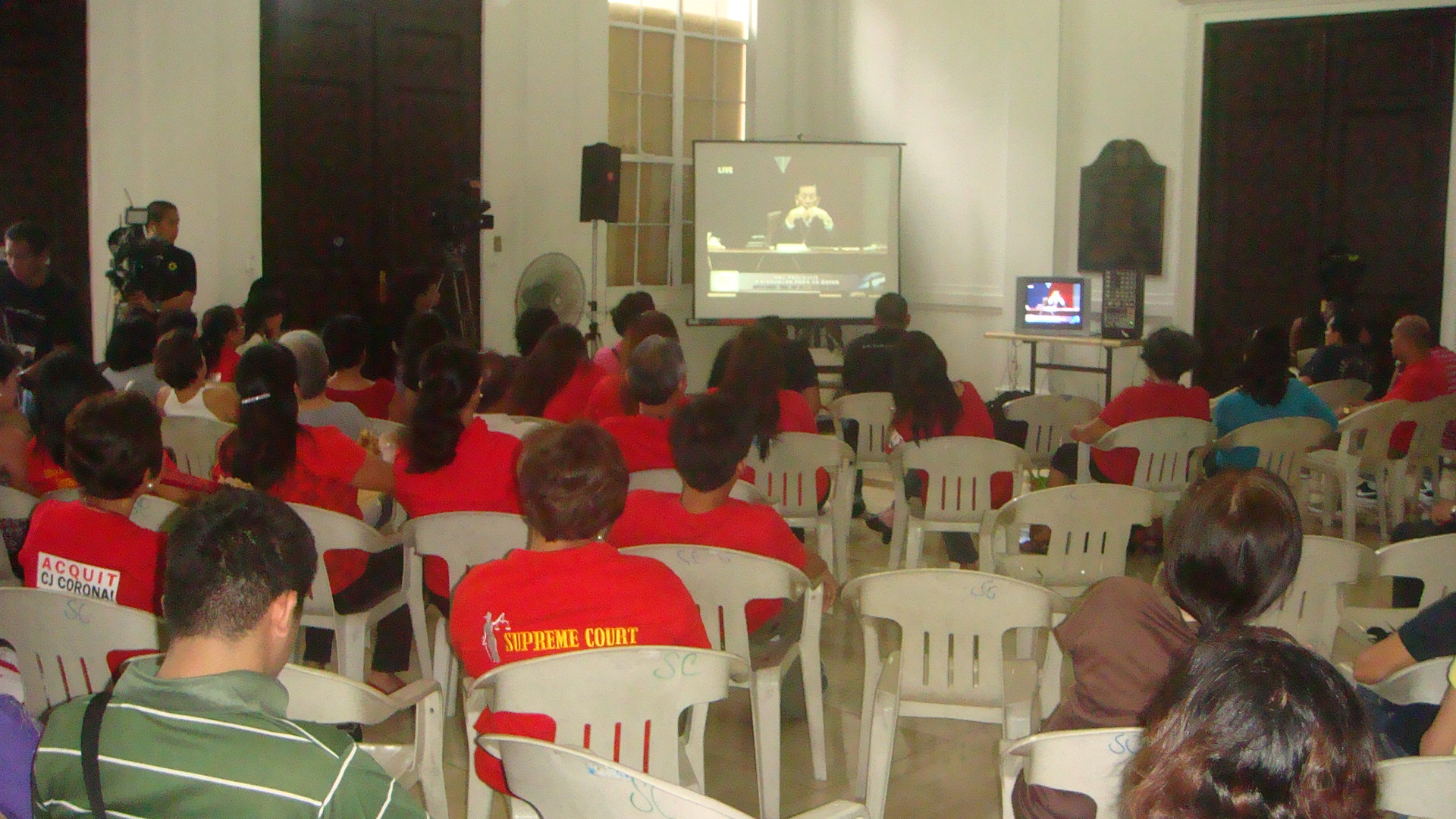
Supreme Court of the Philippines employees watching the Corona Impeachment testimony

== Aftermath ==
=== Bribery controversy ===
In September 2013, Senator Jinggoy Estrada revealed in a privilege speech that senators who voted to convict Corona in the impeachment trial were given an additional ₱50 million in discretionary funds. He claimed that the allocation was provided in a private and confidential letter from Senate president Franklin Drilon, the Senate finance committee chairperson at the time, as an "incentive" for voting for Corona's conviction. Following the allegations, Drilon confirmed that ₱50 million was released to the senators as part of the Priority Development Assistance Fund, but denied it was intended to be a bribe. Senators Ralph Recto and Serge Osmeña also confirmed receiving the funds but could not recall the amount or purpose of the funds.

Following the revelations, budget secretary Florencio Abad confirmed the release of an additional ₱1.107 billion in pork barrel funds to senators who voted to convict Corona. According to Abad, two of the three senators who voted to acquit Corona received nothing: Senator Bongbong Marcos and Senator Miriam Defensor-Santiago. He claimed the funds were part of the Disbursement Acceleration Program (DAP), a relatively new and little known lump-sum budgetary item introduced by the Aquino administration. On July 1, 2014, the Supreme Court ruled the DAP unconstitutional, reaffirming that ruling on February 3, 2015.

Senator Joker Arroyo, who voted to acquit Corona, denied receiving the alleged 'incentive' funds, and accused the Aquino administration of "outright bribery, right at the presidential doorstep". Santiago encouraged Supreme Court litigation regarding the DAP, saying that the program was unconstitutional as it allowed the executive branch of government to "play favorites" among senators.

In a statement to reporters, former chief justice Corona said that the revelations vindicated him and proved that his ouster was a violation of the constitution. He said he was not surprised by them, as they merely confirmed what he and many Filipinos had suspected.

On January 20, 2014, Senator Ramon Bong Revilla revealed that he was convinced by President Benigno Aquino III to convict the chief justice.

When the Supreme Court released its decision about DAP, Sen. Miriam Defensor Santiago, urged the 20 senators and 188 representatives to return the "reward money" they received and said that President Aquino was in violation of the constitution by giving "reward money", a probable cause to a impeachment complaint against Aquino, Santiago added the solons can sue on this case. However due to Liberal Party (Team PNoy) dominant Congress, the impeachment cannot be successful.

Renato Corona died on April 29, 2016, just over two months before Aquino's term ended. In June 2016, the Sandiganbayan Third Division dismissed his pending criminal cases.

== See also ==
Other impeachment proceedings in the Philippines:

- Impeachment of Joseph Estrada
- Impeachment of Merceditas Gutierrez
- First and second impeachment of Sara Duterte
