= Eduardo de los Angeles =

Eduardo de los Angeles is a former president of the Philippine Stock Exchange, the financial stock market of the Philippines. He is a former dean of the Ateneo Law School, a private law school in Makati, Philippines.

He is a managing partner at Romulo Mabanta Buenaventura Sayoc and De Los Angeles, the third largest law firm in the country.

== Early life and education ==
De los Angeles was born in 1942. He obtained a Bachelor of Arts degree from the Ateneo de Manila University in 1962, a Bachelor of Laws degree from the Ateneo Law School in 1966, and a Master of Laws degree from Columbia Law School of Columbia University in New York in 1970.

== Career ==
De los Angeles has practiced law for several years. In the government, he was invited to serve as a Consultant in the Presidential Blue Ribbon Commission, and as chairman in the Technical Committee of the Bureau of Higher Education of the Department of Education, Culture, and Sports (DECS), a cabinet-level department. He also acted as a Consultant in the Revision of Rules of Court Committee of the Philippine Supreme Court.

He was elected President of the Philippine Stock Exchange (PSE) in 1993. He is currently a Managing Partner at Romulo Mabanta, the third largest law firm in the country.

== Academe ==
De los Angeles has been a Professorial Lecturer at the Ateneo Law School since 1971. He also taught as a Bar Reviewer in the school's pre-bar review programs. He was appointed as Dean of the law school in 1984. He served in this capacity until 1989.

== Organizations ==
De los Angeles is active in various legal groups. He served as President of the Philippine Association of Law Professors in 1986; President of the Philippine Association of Law Schools in 1987; President of the Philippine Bar Association in 1992; Chairman of the Legal Aid Committee of the Philippine Judicature Society; and Vice Chairman of the Committee on Legal Education of the ASEAN Law Association.

He is a member of the Integrated Bar of the Philippines (IBP) and the American Bar Association (ABA).

He is also a member of the Fraternal Order of Utopia.
