= Euro Generals scandal =

The Euro Generals Scandal involves Eliseo de la Paz and several Philippine National Police (PNP) officials who went to Russia in October 2008 to attend an Interpol conference. De la Paz was detained for carrying a large sum of undeclared money.

== Details of the scandal ==
Eight police officers and Eliseo de la Paz along with the spouses of some police officials and General Jesus Versoza went to Russia to attend an International Police conference in October 2008.

The police generals disbursed PNP intelligence funds for their travel allowance, leading to allegations of corruption, money smuggling, and misuse of state funds.

Former PNP comptroller Eliseo de la Paz and his wife were briefly detained and interrogated at the Moscow international airport for carrying an undeclared 105,000 euros or ₱6.9 million in cash.

== Investigation ==
On November 19, 2008, the House Committee on Public Order and Safety launched its own investigation into the "euro generals". Nueva Ecija Representative Rodolfo Antonino, panel chair, said that the panel has sent out invitations to all police officers who went to Russia, retired national Police comptroller Eliseo de la Paz and Local Governments Secretary Ronaldo Puno. Also invited were Budget and Management Secretary Rolando Andaya Jr. and a senior representative from the Commission on Audit. The panel also reviewed reports of the PNP and the National Police Commission.

== Findings ==
A team of investigators led by Assistant Ombudsman Joselito Fangon recommended the filing of graft charges against former PNP comptroller Eliseo de la Paz and his colleagues.

The investigators also recommended the filing of similar charges against former PNP Director General Avelino Razon Jr. and several top officials including Samuel Rodriguez, Orlando Pestaño, Tomas Rentoy III, Elmer Pelobello, Romeo Ricardo, Emmanuel Carta, Ismael Rafanan, German Doria, Silverio Alarcio Jr., and Jaime Caringal.

Based on their findings however, investigators said the amount came from "private funds".

The team said the PNP officials violated section 3(e) of the Anti-Graft and Corrupt Practices Act.

The Field Investigation Office (FIO) anchored its recommendations on an alleged violation of Article 217 of the Revised Penal Code, or malversation of funds.

The FIO recommended the filing of several criminal and administrative charges against several of the respondents.

The recommended charges were falsification of public documents, prolonging of performance of duties, violation of the passport law, obstruction of the apprehension and prosecution of criminal offenders, perjury, and violation of the New Central Bank Act.

== Charges ==
In 2010, the office of the Ombudsman filed graft charges against twelve former and active ranking PNP officials for their alleged involvement in the incident.

In 2019, the Sandiganbayan dismissed the graft and technical malversation charges against the nine retired police officers. In dismissing the cases, the court stated that while the prosecution was able to prove that the retiring police officers’ attendance at the Interpol general assembly violated the 2008 General Appropriations Act, it was not established that they acted with criminal design or bad faith. It found that the prosecution failed to establish the guilt of the accused beyond reasonable doubt and failed to prove that their acts had caused “undue injury” to the government. Further, the court noted the Commission on Audit (COA) did not even issue a Notice of Disallowance on the disbursement of the fund, negating the alleged irregularities in its release.

In 2022, the Sandiganbayan ordered Eliseo de la Paz to pay a fine of ₱200,000 for his failure to declare before the Bureau of Customs the transport of currency above $10,000.
