= Merceditas Gutierrez =

Filipino government official

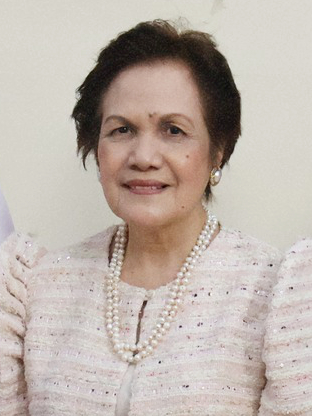
- Gutierrez in 2025

2nd Chairperson of the National Commission of Senior Citizens
- Incumbent
- Assumed office November 4, 2025
- President: Bongbong Marcos
- Preceded by: Franklin Quijano

4th Ombudsman of the Philippines
- In office December 1, 2005 – May 6, 2011
- President: Gloria Macapagal Arroyo; Benigno Aquino III
- Preceded by: Simeon V. Marcelo
- Succeeded by: Orlando C. Casimiro (acting)

Secretary of Justice
- In office December 24, 2003 – August 31, 2004
- President: Gloria Macapagal Arroyo
- Preceded by: Simeon Datumanong
- Succeeded by: Raul M. Gonzalez
- In office November 27, 2002 – January 15, 2003
- President: Gloria Macapagal Arroyo
- Preceded by: Hernando Perez
- Succeeded by: Simeon Datumanong

Personal details
- Born: Ma. Merceditas Consunji Navarro; September 24, 1948 (age 78) Samal, Bataan, Philippines
- Children: At least 2
- Relatives: Brian Poe Llamanzares (son-in-law)
- Education: Ateneo School of Law
- Profession: Lawyer

Ma. Merceditas Consunji Navarro-Gutierrez (born September 24, 1948) is a Filipino lawyer and government official who is currently serving as member of the board of trustees of Government Service Insurance System (GSIS). Following her graduation from the Ateneo de Manila University Law School in 1973, she established herself as a significant figure within the governmental sphere through key appointments. Aside from becoming a two-time Justice Secretary of the Philippine Justice Department, Gutierrez also became the first woman to head the post of Ombudsman. She assumed the position on December 1, 2005, and resigned from office on May 6, 2011.

== Early life ==
Merceditas Gutierrez was the second child of the former Vice-Governor and Representative of Bataan, Rufino Navarro Sr. and Candelaria Consunji. She was the second of five children and attended elementary and high school in the small town of Samal, Bataan. Gutierrez moved to Manila for College and graduated from the Ateneo de Manila University Law School in 1973, wherein she was a schoolmate of the First Gentleman Mike Arroyo. She was initially unable to take the Bar exam due to her pregnancy with her first child, Johnny Gutierrez. However, upon taking the Bar the next year, Merceditas successfully passed her first attempt. Soon after, in 1983, she began engaging herself in government services. She became the Legal Officer of the Philippine Aerospace Development Corporation (PADC), then, Presidential Legal Officer of the Philippine Presidential Office. Her achievements in those government offices earned her a personal promotion by then-President Gloria Macapagal Arroyo to the National Economic and Development Authority of the Philippines.

== Government career ==
=== Secretary of justice ===
Gutierrez worked for the Department of Justice (DOJ) for almost two decades and was appointed by President Gloria Macapagal-Arroyo as Undersecretary of Justice in 2001. In the year 2002, Gutierrez was designated as the Acting Secretary for Secretary Hernando Perez then, Secretary Simeon Datumanong in 2004.

=== Ombudsman ===
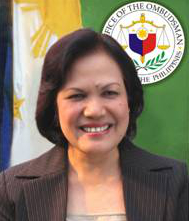
Gutierrez's portrait as ombudsman

On December 1, 2005, President Arroyo appointed Gutierrez to the post of Ombudsman, who is responsible for investigating erring government officials. Thus, she became the first woman to be appointed as ombudsman in Philippines. In June 2007, she was elected as vice-president of the 22-member Asian Ombudsman Association (AOA), a regional grouping which aims to improve multilateral cooperation among Asian countries in the fight against the social menace.

In March 2009, former Senate President Jovito Salonga and civil society groups filed impeachment charges before the Philippine Congress against Gutierrez, alleging that she mishandled cases. The complaint was later dismissed.

On July 22, 2010, a new impeachment complaint was filed against Gutierrez by Akbayan party-list representative Risa Hontiveros, former Brigadier General Danilo Lim and Evelyn Pestano on the basis of "illegal, unjust, improper or inefficient" handling of cases. In August 2010, another impeachment complaint was filed by Bagong Alyansang Makabayan for inaction on the Fertilizer Fund scam, the Euro Generals scandal, and the Mega Pacific scandal. The Senate Blue Ribbon Committee on March 10, 2011, recommended the impeachment and resignation of Gutierrez as well as the firing of members of the Office of the Special Prosecutor for "neglecting, weakening and complicating" the plunder case against former military comptroller Maj. Gen. Carlos Garcia and his family.

On March 22, 2011, the House of Representatives voted to impeach Gutierrez on charges of betraying the public trust, with four representatives abstaining, 46 against, and 210 for the impeachment, thereby sending the impeachment to the Senate. However, Gutierrez resigned on April 29, resulting in the cancelation of the impeachment trial.

=== GSIS ===
In April 2023, Gutierrez was appointed as member of the board of trustees of the Government Service Insurance System.

=== NCSC ===
On October 22, 2025, President Bongbong Marcos appointed Gutierrez as chair of the National Commission of Senior Citizens. She assumed the role on November 4, 2025 taking over from Officer in Charge, Mary Jean Loreche.

== Personal life ==
Gutierrez's daughter is DOJ undersecretary Margarita Gutierrez, who has been married to FPJ Panday Bayanihan congressman Brian Poe Llamanzares since 2026.

Government offices
Preceded by Simeon V. Marcelo	Ombudsman of the Republic of the Philippines; 2005–2011	Succeeded by Orlando C. Casimiro (acting)
Preceded by Simeon Datumanong	Secretary of Justice; 2003–2004	Succeeded by Raul M. Gonzalez
Preceded by Hernando Perez	Secretary of Justice; 2002–2003	Succeeded by Simeon Datumanong
