= List of political scandals in the Philippines =

The following are a list of political scandals in the Philippines.

== 1940s ==
Date	Branch	Department	Party	People Involved	Summary	Source
1946	Executive	Office of the President	Liberal	Manuel Roxas	Surplus War Property scandal- disposed $90 billion of surplus war property held by the United States government in the final year of World War II, which caused a huge corruption scandal that led to the rise of the leftist HUKBALAHAP and for Roxas's approval ratings to crash toward the end of his administration.	

== 1950s ==
Date	Branch	Department	Party	People Involved	Summary	Source
1950	Executive	Office of the President	Liberal	Elpidio Quirino	Golden Arinola scandal – which involved Pres. Elpidio Quirino, that led to the creation of the Senate Blue Ribbon Committee.	

== 1960s ==
Date	Branch	Department	Party	People Involved	Summary	Source
March 2, 1962	All Branches	Department of Justice	Multiple parties See also: Stonehill scandal	Harry Stonehill, DOJ Sec. Jose W. Diokno, Pres. Diosdado Macapagal, Ferdinand Marcos, et al.	Stonehill controversy – involving American businessman Harry Stonehill with a $50-million business empire in the Philippines;	
1968					Jabidah massacre – the murder of an estimated 28 to 68 Moro Muslims, who were clandestinely being trained on the island of Corregidor to instigate a rebellion in Sabah, Malaysia.	

== 1970s ==
Date	Branch	Department	Party	People Involved	Summary	Source
1970	Executive	Office of the President	Nacionalista Party	Ferdinand Marcos	Dovie Beams Tapes Scandal – sex scandal involving Pres. Ferdinand Marcos	
1972	Executive	Office of the President	Nacionalista Party	Ferdinand Marcos	Rolex 12 – controversy involving Pres. Ferdinand Marcos' favoring certain Generals to propagate his terms of office.	
1973 - 1982	Executive	Office of the President	Kilusang Bagong Lipunan	Ferdinand Marcos	Coco Levy Fund Scam – controversy involving Pres. Ferdinand Marcos and his cronies for conspired to tax coconut farmers.	

== 1980s ==
Date	Branch	Department	Party	People Involved	Summary	Source
1981				Imelda Marcos	Manila Film Center Accident and cover up.	
1984 (2012)	Executive	Ministry of Energy		Ferdinand Marcos, Herminio Disini	Bataan Nuclear Power Plant bribery and graft case.	
1986		First Lady	Kilusang Bagong Lipunan	Imelda Marcos	Imelda Marcos' shoe collection	
	Executive	Office of the President	Kilusang Bagong Lipunan	Ferdinand Marcos	Marcos scandals – incidents of alleged corruption linked to Japanese Official Development Assistance to the Philippines during the Marcos' administration.	
1986					Operation Big Bird, 1986 – the bungled plan of the Philippine Government to retrieve the unexplained wealth of the Marcos family in Swiss banks.	

== 1990s ==
Date	Branch	Department	Party	People Involved	Summary	Source
1993	Local Government	Province		Antonio Sanchez	Mayor Antonio Sanchez case – involving the then-mayor of Calauan, Laguna in the rape and murder of Eileen Sarmenta, a UP Los Baños student, and the murder of Sarmenta's friend, Allan Gomez.	
1995	Executive	Office of the President	Lakas–NUCD	Fidel Ramos	PEA Amari Scam – Pres. Fidel V. Ramos was accused of corruption in the controversial deal that involved the acquisition of 158 hectares of reclaimed land on Manila Bay that was to be converted into so-called Freedom Islands.	
1998	Executive	Office of the President	PMP	Joseph Estrada	Subic Bay Leadership Dispute – Pres. Joseph Estrada's Executive Order No. 1 orders the removal of Richard Gordon as Chairman of the Subic Bay Metropolitan Authority (SBMA), and replaces him with Felicito Payumo.	
1998	Executive	Office of the President	PMP	Joseph Estrada	Textbook Scam & Nepotism – Pres. Estrada appoints relatives to government positions, and intervenes in their behalf.	
	Executive	Office of the President	PMP	Joseph Estrada	Hot Cars Scandal – Pres. Estrada assigns seized vehicles by the Bureau of Customs to his Cabinet secretaries and favored political allies.	

== 2000s ==
Date	Branch	Department	Party	People Involved	Summary	Source
		Office of the President	PMP	Joseph Estrada	BW Resources scandal – Pres. Estrada and associates profit from an alleged stock manipulation scheme.	
					Estrada Midnight Cabinet – Chief of Staff Aprodicio Laquian jests in a press conference that he is the only one sober during the President's "Midnight Cabinet," drinking and gambling sessions in Malacañan Palace.	
2000	Executive	Office of the President	PMP	Joseph Estrada	Juetengate – Chavit Singson exposé on Pres. Joseph Estrada receiving jueteng payoffs and bribes. This led to the impeachment of Estrada and eventual downfall.	
2004	Executive	Office of the President	Lakas–CMD	Gloria Macapagal Arroyo	Hello Garci scandal – scandal involving Pres. Gloria Macapagal Arroyo on committing electoral fraud during the 2004 National Elections.	
2004	Executive	Office of the President, Department of Agriculture	Lakas–CMD	Gloria Macapagal Arroyo, Jocelyn Bolante	Fertilizer Fund scam – controversy involving accusations that Agriculture Undersecretary Jocelyn Bolante diverted ₱728 million in fertilizer funds to the 2004 election campaign of President Arroyo.	
2008	Judicial	Court of Appeals		Conrado Vasquez, Vicente Roxas, Jose Sabio	GSIS-Meralco bribery case – controversy involving Court of Appeals Presiding Justice Conrado Vasquez, Justices Vicente Roxas and Jose Sabio, for the allegations of bribery.	
2008					Philippine National Broadband Network controversy – (also referred to as the NBN/ZTE deal or NBN/ZTE mess) involved allegations of corruption in the awarding of a US$329 million construction contract to Chinese telecommunications firm ZTE for the proposed government-managed National Broadband Network (NBN).	
2008	Executive	Department of the Interior and Local Government		Eliseo de la Paz	Euro Generals scandal – involves Eliseo de la Paz and several Philippine National Police officials who went to Russia in October 2008 to attend the Interpol conference. De la Paz was detained for carrying a large sum of undeclared money.	
2008	Legislature	Senate		Migz Zubiri	Pimentel III vs. Zubiri Senate Electoral Protest – Atty. Koko Pimentel filed an election protest at the Senate Electoral Tribunal (SET) against the proclamation of Migz Zubiri as senator in the aftermath of the 2007 Philippine Senate election.	
2009	Executive	Office of the President	Lakas–Kampi–CMD	Gloria Macapagal Arroyo	2009 National Artist Controversy – controversial proclamation as National Artists of the Philippines of four individuals via the Presidential prerogative of Gloria Macapagal Arroyo, when the four have not been nominated by the selection committee, composed of representatives from National Commission for Culture and the Arts (NCCA) and the Cultural Center of the Philippines (CCP).	
2009					Maguindanao massacre – involves the Ampatuan family and several others for the kidnapping and killing of 58 people in Ampatuan, Maguindanao.	

== 2010s ==
Date	Branch	Department	Party	People Involved	Summary	Source
2010	Executive	Office of the President	Liberal	Benigno Aquino III	Manila hostage crisis – former president Benigno Aquino III's first term was marred by violence when eight Hong Kong tourists were killed by a disgruntled former police officer Rolando Mendoza, after a bungled hostage rescue attempt by the Manila Police District. The incident also strained ties between the Philippines and Hong Kong.	
2011	Executive	Department of National Defence		Angelo Reyes	2011 Armed Forces of the Philippines corruption scandal – involving former AFP Chief of Staff Gen. Angelo Reyes and several other retired military officials.	
2013	Legislature	Senate	PMP	Juan Ponce Enrile	2013 Senate of the Philippines funds controversy – involving former Senate President Juan Ponce Enrile and several other senator for allegedly use of the operating expenses of senators, known as the Maintenance and Other Operating Expenses (MOOE).	
2013				Janet Lim-Napoles, Senators Juan Ponce Enrile, Jinggoy Estrada, Ramon Revilla Jr., and Lower House representatives	Priority Development Assistance Fund scam – involving businesswoman Janet Lim-Napoles and other politicians.	
2014	Executive. Legislature	Office of the President, Senate, House Representatives	Liberal	Benigno Aquino III, Florencio Abad, Renato Corona	Disbursement Acceleration Program controversy – involving former president Benigno Aquino III and Budget and Management Secretary Florencio Abad to bribe senators and congressmen to impeach and oust Renato Corona in 2012.	
2014	Executive	Office of the Vice President	PDP–Laban	Jejomar Binay	Jejomar Binay's alleged corruption scandal – involving former Vice President Jejomar Binay and several others for the alleged overpriced contract for the multi-billion-peso Makati City Parking building II.	
2015	Executive	Office of the President, Department of the Interior and Local Government	Liberal	Benigno Aquino III, Alan Purisima, Getulio Napeñas	Mamasapano clash – involving former president Benigno Aquino III, former Philippine National Police chief Alan Purisima and former Special Action Force head Getulio Napeñas for the deaths of 44 police personnel in a clash in Mamasapano, Maguindanao, which was dubbed as the biggest loss of government elite force in history.	
2015	Executive	Department of Transportation			Ninoy Aquino International Airport bullet planting scandal – involving the employees of Office for Transportation Security for accosted and fined for possessing bullet ammunition to the passengers.	
2016	Executive	Department of Justice	Liberal	Leila de Lima	New Bilibid Prison drug trafficking scandal – involving former Justice Secretary, now Senator Leila de Lima and several other government officials linked to illegal drug trade at the New Bilibid Prison.	
2016	Executive	Department of Justice		Al Argosino, Michael Robles	2016 Bureau of Immigration bribery scandal – involving former immigration deputy commissioners Al Argosino and Michael Robles for extorting and receiving ₱50 million from business tycoon Jack Lam, in exchange for the release of his Chinese casino employees, who were arrested for being illegal aliens.	
2017	Executive	Department of the Interior and Local Government			Manila Police District secret jail cell scandal – involving officers of the Manila Police District for the discovery of the so-called 'hidden jail', measuring five-feet wide, behind the bookshelf, which contained about 12 prisoners and it was poorly ventilated, except for an exhaust fan in a raid led by the members of the Commission on Human Rights in Tondo, Manila.	
2017	Executive	Department of the Interior and Local Government	Nacionalista	Imee Marcos	Ilocos Norte tobacco excise tax funds controversy – involving alleged misuse of Ilocos Norte's Tobacco Excise Tax funds by former Governor, now Senator Imee Marcos, partner Mark Chua, and six Ilocos Norte local government officials.	
2017	Executive	Department of Finance		Nicanor Faeldon	2017 Bureau of Customs drug smuggling scandal – involving former Customs Commissioner Nicanor Faeldon and other officials for smuggling of the ₱6.4 billion worth of methamphetamine, locally known as shabu which was seized in two warehouses in Valenzuela, Metro Manila.	
2017				Andres Bautista	Andres Bautista's alleged corruption scandal – involving former Commission on Elections chairman Andres Bautista after his estranged wife, Patricia, accused him of amassing unexplained wealth.	
2017	Executive	Office of the President, Cabinet		Benigno Aquino III, Janette Garin, Florencio Abad	Dengvaxia controversy – involving former president Benigno Aquino III, Health Secretary Janette Garin and Budget and Management Secretary Florencio Abad for the launching of the mass vaccination campaign in 2016, that led to the reports of several children dying from various complications allegedly attributed to the dengue vaccine.	
2018	Executive	Cabinet	PDP–Laban	Wanda Tulfo Teo	DOT–PTV tourism advertisement controversy – involving former Tourism Secretary Wanda Tulfo Teo and Teo's brothers Ben and Erwin Tulfo for the ₱60 million worth of advertisements that the Tourism Department had placed with state-run television and aired over a public service program produced by Bitag Media Unlimited.	
2018	Executive	Department of Tourism		Cesar Montano	Buhay Carinderia scandal – involving former Tourism Promotions Board (TPB) chief operation officer Cesar Montano for the ₱80 million project that will feature Filipino street food and local eateries.	
2018	Executive	Department of Finance, Department of National Defense		Isidro Lapeña	2018 Bureau of Customs drug smuggling scandal – involving former Customs Commissioner Isidro Lapeña and other officials for smuggling of the ₱11 billion worth of methamphetamine, locally known as shabu which was discovered inside the magnetic lifters in a warehouse in General Mariano Alvarez, Cavite.	
2019	Executive	Department of Justice		Nicanor Faeldon, Antonio Sanchez	Good Conduct Time Allowance controversy – involving former Bureau of Corrections Director General Nicanor Faeldon and several other government officials for the suppose release of former Calauan, Laguna Mayor Antonio Sanchez, the prime suspect in the rape and murder of Eileen Sarmenta and her friend Allan Gomez on June 28–29, 1993, and the release of Josman Aznar, Ariel Balansag, Alberto Caño and James Anthony Uy, the 4 suspects in the rape and murder of sisters Marijoy and Jacqueline Chiong on July 16–17, 1997.	
2019	Executive	Department of the Interior and Local Government		Oscar Albayalde	PNP Ninja cops controversy – involving former Philippine National Police chief Gen. Oscar Albayalde and several other officers for an allegedly anomalous anti-drug operation in Mexico, Pampanga on November 29, 2013.	

== 2020s ==
Date	Branch	Department	Party	People Involved	Summary	Source
2020	Executive	Department of Justice			"Pastillias Bribery" scandal – involved several officials of the Bureau of Immigration in the scheme in which mass numbers of Chinese nationals were escorted through the immigration process in exchange for tens of thousands of pesos for each applicant, which totaled to an estimated ₱40 billion.	
2020	Legislature	Senate	PDP–Laban	Koko Pimentel	Home quarantine breaching scandal – Senator Koko Pimentel breached COVID-19 home quarantine restrictions after testing positive to the virus by accompanying his pregnant wife to Makati Medical Centre. This forced a number of medical and hospital staff, who believed to have had contact with the senator, to quarantine.	
2020	Executive	Department of Labor and Employment	PDP–Laban	Mocha Uson, Hans Leo Cacdac	Batangas mass gathering controversy – Overseas Workers Welfare Administration (OWWA) Deputy Administrator Mocha Uson violated the ban on mass gatherings when she organised a meeting with the quarantined 322 Overseas Filipino Workers (OFW) in Lian, Batangas on April 25, 2020. OWWA Administrator Hans Leo Cacdac suggested that there won't be any investigations happening on the alleged violation of the deputy administrator whilst the crisis is still occurring.	
2020	Legislature, Executive	Department of Justice, House of Representatives, Department of Information and Communications Technology	Nacionalista	Jose Calida, Gamaliel Cordoba, Alan Peter Cayetano, Rodrigo Duterte	ABS-CBN franchise renewal controversy – involving Solicitor General Jose Calida, officials of the National Telecommunications Commission and several other personalities for issuing a cease and desist order and the denial of franchise against ABS-CBN that effectively ceasing broadcast operations on May 5 and July 10, 2020.	
2020	Executive	Department of the Interior and Local Government		Debold Sinas, Rodrigo Duterte	Mañanita party controversy – Metro Manila police chief Major General Debold Sinas and 18 other subordinates were charged for not following quarantine rules under the Republic Act No. 11332 (Mandatory Reporting of Notifiable Diseases and Health Events of Public Concern Act) on May 8, 2020. Despite photos of the gathering posted on the official page of the National Capital Region Police Office (NCRPO) on Facebook, Debold Sinas claimed that they followed social distancing measures. Debold Sinas, a presidential appointee, was then later defended by President Rodrigo Duterte saying that police chief will keep his position until further orders.	
2020	Executive	Philippine Health Insurance Corporation		Ricardo C. Morales, Atty. Thorsson Montes Keith	PhilHealth corruption scandal – involving former president and CEO Ricardo C. Morales and several other officials for the alleged corruption and anomalies within the agency based on the testimonies of former anti-fraud legal officer Atty. Thorsson Montes Keith on July 24, 2020.	
2020	Legislature	House of Representatives		Alan Peter Cayetano, Lord Allan Velasco	2020 Philippine House of Representatives leadership crisis – 186 majority members of the House of Representatives elect Lord Allan Jay Velasco as Speaker of the House of Representatives, unseating incumbent Alan Peter Cayetano amidst the political dispute over the Speakership outside the Session Hall of the Batasang Pambansa Complex on October 12, 2020.	
2021	Executive, Legislature		PDP–Laban	Alfonso Cusi, Manny Pacquiao, Koko Pimentel Rodrigo Duterte,	2021 PDP–Laban dispute – involving Energy Secretary Alfonso Cusi and several other personalities for the ousting of its party president, Sen. Manny Pacquiao and its executive vice chairman, Sen. Koko Pimentel on July 17, 2021. This dispute has led to the creation of two factions (Pimentel faction and Cusi faction).	
2021	Executive	Department of Health		Francisco Duque III, Michael Yang, Lloyd Christopher Lao, Warren Rex Liong, Linconn Ong, Mohit Dargani, Krizle Grace Mago	Pharmally scandal – involving Health Secretary Francisco Duque III and several other officials including Michael Yang, Lloyd Christopher Lao, Linconn Ong and Krizle Grace Mago for the alleged overpriced purchase of face masks, face shields and other medical equipment to the government in August 2021.	
2022	Executive	Department of Agriculture		Bongbong Marcos, Vic Rodriguez, Hermenegildo Serafica, Roland Beltran, Aurelio Gerardo Valderrama, Jr., and Leocadio Sebastian	2022–2023 Philippine sugar crisis – involving president Bongbong Marcos, former executive secretary Vic Rodriguez and several other officials from the Sugar Regulatory Administration and the Department of Agriculture for the release of Sugar Order No. 4, which directed the importation of 300,000 MT of sugar to the Philippines in August 2022.	
2025	Executive, Legislature	Department of Public Works and Highways		Vince Dizon, Manuel Bonoan, Curlee Discaya, Sarah Discaya, Zaldy Co, Jinggoy Estrada, Joel Villanueva, Bong Revilla, Mitch Cajayon-Uy	Flood control projects controversy in the Philippines: allegations of ghost flood control projects, substandard construction, monopolization of contracts, and misallocation of billions under the Department of Public Works and Highways (DPWH). Contractors Curlee and Sarah Discaya testified before the Senate Blue Ribbon Committee, naming lawmakers and DPWH officials for soliciting kickbacks of 10-25%. Secretary Vince Dizon has sought bank freezes, an immigration lookout bulletin, and has pledged to blacklist errant contractors. The controversy has spurred public outcry, with multiple investigations, hearings, and calls for greater transparency in flood control infrastructure spending.	

== See also ==
- Government of the Philippines
- Executive departments of the Philippines
- Corruption in the Philippines
