= Ramil Madriaga =

Alleged former security aide of Vice President Sara Duterte

Ramil "Ram" Lagonoy Madriaga (born September 18, 1968/1969) is a Filipino former racing driver and a former security agent for President Rodrigo Duterte and mayor-turned-vice president Sara Duterte. He is currently detained at Camp Bagong Diwa since July 2023 for alleged involvement in a kidnapping case.

== Early life and education ==
Madriaga graduated from San Sebastian College with a law degree in 1995 (another source cites San Beda College of Law), but failed to pass the Philippine Bar Examination in the same year. From 1993 to 1995, Madriaga also worked at the Economic Intelligence and Investigation Bureau simultaneous to his studies.

=== Vicente Uy kidnapping accusation and exoneration ===
On the evening of March 25, 1996, a Chinese-born businessman based in Mandaluyong named Vicente Uy (or Ngo Lit Poon) was kidnapped along Wilson Street in San Juan, Metro Manila and held hostage in Villa Christine resort in Antipolo, Rizal for a ten million peso ransom, with Madriaga alleged to have been the mastermind within a kidnap-for-ransom group that committed the kidnapping. Uy was rescued two days later by the team of Chief Inspector Gilbert dC. Cruz within the Presidential Anti-Crime Commission (PACC) after Uy's daughter Lucy Ngo alerted the authorities.

During the kidnapping trial at the Pasig City Regional Trial Court, Branch 262, Madriaga testified that in the early morning of March 26, his cousin Rosendo B. Madriaga asked for his assistance in leaving the Villa Christine resort while a hostage situation was ongoing, in which "look-outs" surrounded the area and prevented Rosendo from leaving. Ramil alleged that he was hesitant at first to help due to the bar exam results that were about to be announced, but decided to alert an army officer at Camp Aguinaldo later that day, and the day after went to Virginia Avelita, Uy's common-law wife and the name provided by his cousin, who then informed Lucy about the incident.

Although Madriaga testified that he assisted Cruz and Uy's daughter in rescuing Uy on March 27, both Ramil and Rosendo Madriaga as well as James M. Patano were declared guilty of kidnapping for ransom by the Pasig City Regional Trial Court, Branch 262 on April 30, 1997, and sentenced to death. The case was later brought before the Supreme Court, which eventually reversed the trial court's ruling on March 14, 2003 in a decision written by Justice Alicia Austria-Martinez. The Supreme Court found the prosecution to have "failed to adduce the quantum of proof necessary" for conviction, with the prosecution disregarding the testimony of the defendants while largely relying on the credibility of their 21-year-old witness Richard Dimal, the latter of which gave an uncorroborated account of the incident "so incredible that a complete reversal of the findings of the trial court is warranted"; the court stated that "The testimonies of Lucy Ngo, Virginia Avelita and Maj. Cruz all show that it was through the information given by appellant Ramil that they were able to locate Vicente Uy."

Madriaga, his cousin and Patano were thus released from the New Bilibid Prison in Muntinlupa, while the Supreme Court then instructed the National Bureau of Investigation and the Philippine National Police to arrest Manolo Babac and Allan Duerto, then at large, for the crime. By the time of his release, Madriaga had been working for the National Security Council since 2001, according to his 2025 affidavit.

== Career ==
In April 2012, Madriaga participated in the first round of the 2012 Philippine Grand Touring (GT) Series. In February 2013, he participated as a representative of IRM Racing in the Philippine Touring Car Championship Series at the Batangas Racing Circuit.

Prior to the 2016 elections, Madriaga worked for Congressman Roilo Golez of Parañaque, assisting him in matters of intelligence gathering and "sabotage operations". Golez later introduced Madriaga to Davao City Mayor Rodrigo Duterte around late 2015 to early 2016, when Duterte was a presidential candidate in the 2016 election. After Duterte's election as president, Madriaga alleged that he was hired to work directly for Duterte as a counter-intelligence agent under the National Security Council (NSC), and later for the Presidential Security Group (PSG). As a counter-intelligence agent, Madriaga claimed to have been instructed by president Duterte to monitor and sabotage Senator Antonio Trillanes, with Duterte stopping short of ordering for Trillanes' assassination due to his contacts within the Armed Forces.

By 2018, president Duterte allegedly introduced Madriaga to his daughter, Davao City Mayor Sara Duterte, at his home in Barangay Bangkal during their discussions on Sara's 2019 reelection run, and soon after Madriaga began assisting her in intelligence gathering. Madriaga claimed that Mayor Duterte gave strict instructions to him not to hold any conversation with her via text, only through calls.

As early as 2020, Madriaga had organized a group named Inday Sara Is My President (ISIP Pilipinas Movement), which aimed to convince Mayor Sara Duterte to run for president in the 2022 election. The group was formed upon the alleged instruction of President Duterte and Mayor Duterte to Madriaga in 2019 that he help create an organization supporting Sara's 2022 candidacy. Madriaga founded the organization with lawyer Ryan Rey S. Quilala, a former law professor of Duterte at San Sebastian College who had known Madriaga since the latter's Supreme Court case (People of the Philippines vs. Patano) in 2003. Lord Essex "Lordy" Polintan served as the organization's president, while Duterte herself was alleged to have provided funding for the group. Madriaga also claimed that soon after ISIP Pilipinas' formation, president Duterte informed him that "Maestrado Lim" and Pharmally executive Allan Lim (or Lin Wei Xiong) would provide additional funding for their activities. By November 16, 2021, Duterte decided to run for vice president instead, partnering with presidential candidate Bongbong Marcos to be his running mate.

During the same year, Madriaga allegedly encountered several farmers in Bataan who sought his help in a land grabbing case involving Harry Roque, a Duterte ally, wherein they accused First Bataan Mariveles Holdings Corporation (FBMHC) of evicting more than 120 families from a 421 hectare land in Mariveles. FBMHC is a company partly owned by Myla Roque, the wife of Harry Roque, while company CEO Danny Corral was an incorporator of Lucky South 99, a Philippine offshore gaming operator (POGO) also linked to Harry Roque that has since been shut down for its illegal activities; a complaint was eventually filed by 77 farmers before the Ombudsman in January 2023.

In 2022, Madriaga claimed to have been instrumental in the formation of Vice President Sara Duterte's security unit, the Vice Presidential Security and Protection Group (VPSPG), in June 2022, having worked secure vice president Duterte alongside Colonel Raymund Dante P. Lachica, the VPSPG head, and Colonel Dennis Nolasco from July 2022 to April 2023.

Around 2023, Madriaga brought the issue of the Bataan farmers to the attention of vice president Duterte, upon which she asked him to bring the farmers to the Serendra condominium in Bonifacio Global City, Taguig, where one of her residences is located. Madriaga soon brought the farmers to Serendra, and asked them to wait outside while he spoke with Duterte. However, Madriaga claimed that upon mentioning FBMHC to her, "she told me that she cannot do anything and that she will no longer meet with the group of farmers."

Some time after, Madriaga was accused of perpetrating the 2022 kidnapping of two Chinese nationals, and was later arrested alongside Jaime M. Patano and four others by the PNP Anti-Kidnapping Group in Cainta, Rizal on July 12, 2023 and brought to Camp Bagong Diwa in Taguig under the Bureau of Jail Management and Penology (BJMP). Immediately after Madriaga's arrest, Roque filmed a video congratulating the PNP Anti-Kidnapping Group for arresting "a truly shameless kidnapper that is Ramil Madriaga". Madriaga later recounted his feeling of betrayal: "that despite all my efforts to support Sara - to the extent of even committing high-risk acts for her and her family, she did not lift a finger to stop Harry Roque, who is her known ally and supporter, from filing the unfounded kidnapping case against me."

=== December 2025 affidavit ===
In December 2025, Madriaga filed an affidavit dated November 29 before the Office of the Ombudsman alleging that he served under Cols. Raymund Lachica and Dennis Nolasco in the delivery of confidential funds to several point persons, among whom were an aide to a mayor from Laguna and the owner of a Quezon City comedy bar. Aside from the confidential funds, he also claimed that he has personally been engaging in this type of operation for Duterte even prior to her becoming vice president in 2022. Madriaga and his lawyer Raymund Palad claimed that Duterte visited his jail cell twice in October 2025, with the second visit taking place on October 19, a day before Palad visited Madriaga.

== Personal life ==
Madriaga is a member of Iglesia ni Cristo. He and his cousin Rosendo were detained at the New Bilibid Prison from 1996 to 2003 as a result of the Vicente Uy kidnapping case, and were only released in March 2003 upon being acquitted by the Supreme Court.

ISIP Pilipinas co-founder Ryan Rey Quilala and his wife Aurea "Rhea" Quilala served as godparents in Madriaga's son's wedding.
