= Unexplained wealth of the Marcos family =

Wealth of the Marcos family

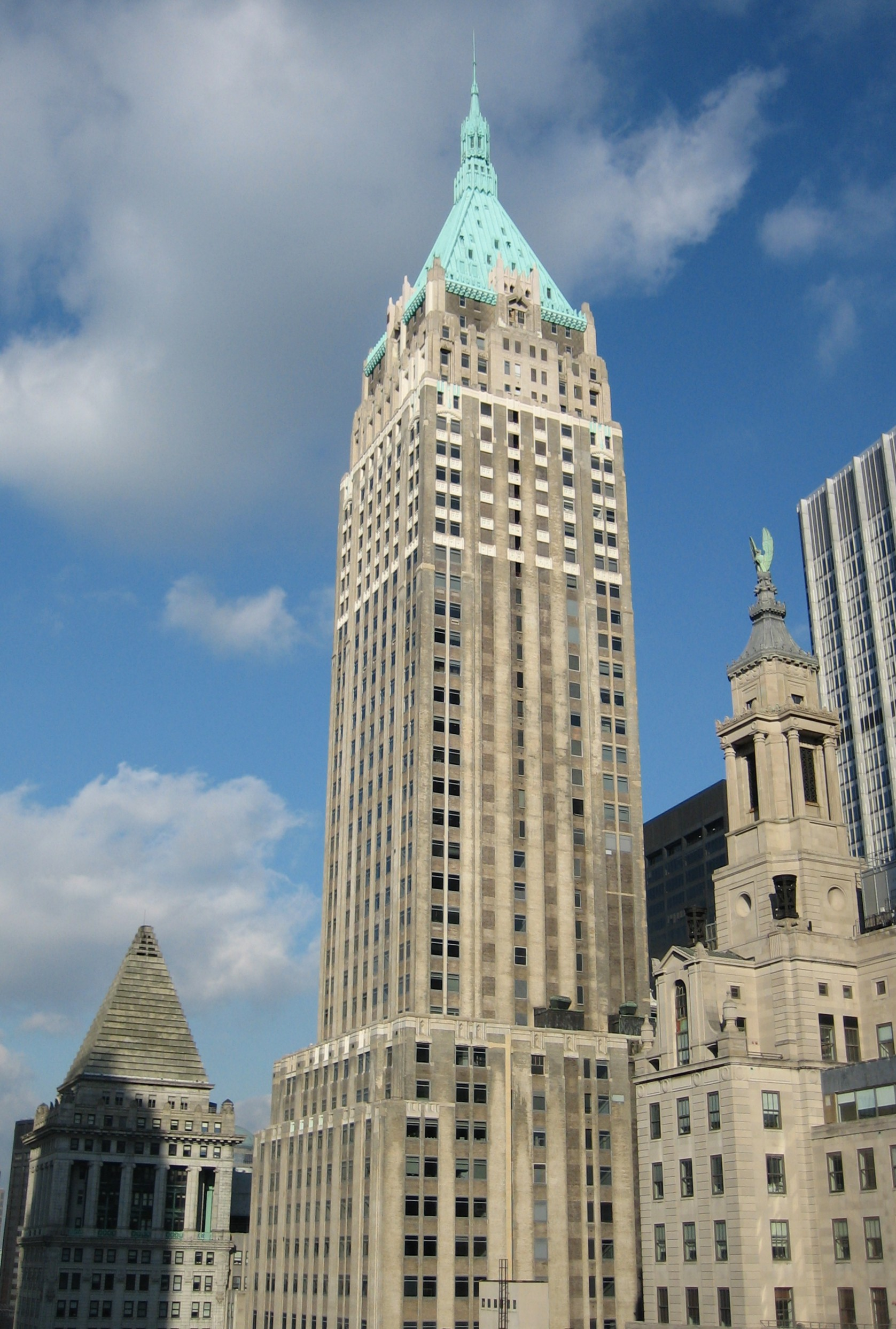
A 2005 image of 40 Wall Street, one of four Manhattan buildings purchased by the Marcoses in the early 1980s.

The Marcos family, a political family in the Philippines, owns different assets that Philippine courts have determined to have been acquired through illicit means during the presidency of Ferdinand Marcos from 1965–1986. These assets are referred to using several terms, including "ill-gotten wealth" and "unexplained wealth," while some authors such as Belinda Aquino and Philippine Senator Jovito Salonga more bluntly refer to it as the "Marcos Plunder".

Legally, the Philippine Supreme Court defines this as the assets the Marcoses acquired beyond the amount legally declared by Ferdinand and Imelda Marcos in the president's statements of assets and liabilities—which amounts to only about US$13,500.00 from his salary as president. The court also deems that such wealth should be forfeited and turned over to the government or to the human rights victims of Marcos's authoritarian regime. Estimates of the amount the Marcoses reportedly acquired in the last few years of the Marcos administration range from US$5 billion to $13 billion. No exact figures can be determined for the amount acquired through the entire 21 years of the Marcos regime, but prominent Marcos-era economist Jesus Estanislao has suggested that the amount could be as high as US$30 billion.

Among the sources of the Marcos wealth are alleged to be: diverted foreign economic aid (e.g. Marcos Japanese ODA scandal), US Government military aid (including huge discretionary funds at Marcos disposal as a "reward" for sending some Filipino troops to Vietnam) and kickbacks from public works contracts over a two-decades-long rule.

This wealth includes: real estate assets both within the Philippines and in several other countries, notably the United States; collections of jewelry and artwork; shares and other financial instruments; bank accounts, both in the Philippines and overseas, notably Switzerland, the United States, Singapore, and the British Virgin Islands; and in some instances, actual cash assets.

Some of this wealth has been recovered as the result of various court cases, either as funds or properties returned to the Philippine government, or by being awarded as reparations to the victims of human rights abuses under Marcos's presidency. Philippine Supreme Court, Sandiganbayan, and courts abroad have issued convictions or rulings that confirm the plunder of Ferdinand Marcos and Imelda Marcos, Marcos family members, and cronies. Some of the stolen wealth has been recovered by the Philippine government through settlements and compromise deals, either with the Marcoses themselves or with cronies who said that certain properties had been entrusted to them by the Marcoses. Some of the recovery cases have been dismissed by the courts for reasons including improper case filing procedures and technical issues with documentary evidence. An unknown amount is not recoverable because the full extent of the Marcos wealth is unknown.

== Estimates ==
Estimates of the alleged ill-gotten wealth of the Marcos family vary, with most sources accepting a figure of about US$5 billion–10 billion for wealth acquired in the last years of the Marcos administration, but with rough extreme estimates of wealth acquired since the 1950s going as high as US$30 billion.

In a 1985 report to the United States Congress House Committee on Foreign Affairs, Ambassador Stephen Bosworth estimated that the Marcoses had stolen an accumulated wealth of US$10 billion "in recent years", in the context of the rapid decline of the Philippine economy in the early 1980s. The same figure was cited by the Philippines' Office of the Solicitor General soon after Marcos was deposed by the EDSA Revolution in 1986.

Bosworth's source, Dr. Bernardo Villegas of the Philippine think tank the Center for Research and Communication (CRC), noted that the rough 10 billion figure ultimately cited by Bosworth was already well below the conservative estimate which can be derived from an analysis of the Philippines' import and export figures. In an interview with the Catholic newspaper Veritas, Villegas cited economic data gathered by the CRC saying that the conservative figure for the Marcoses' unexplained wealth would be a minimum of $13.145 billion, and could be as high as $30 billion. Villegas noted that his analysis was based on figures tabulated by the CRC from 1977 to 1985, and added that the hidden wealth was self-evident, saying "kitang kita ang ebidensya" ("the evidence is very visible").

The PCGG's first chair Jovito Salonga later said that he estimated figure of US$5 billion–10 billion, based on the documentary trail left behind by the Marcoses in 1986. Internationally, Salonga's estimate has become the popularly cited estimate of the Marcoses' unexplained wealth, and it is this amount for which the Marcoses were cited by Guinness World Records as having perpetrated the "largest-ever theft from a government" in 1989 — a record they are still holding in 2024.

However, Dr. Jesus Estanislao, another noted economist from the Center for Research and Communication, pointed out that this figure reflected amounts taken out of the country in the years immediately prior to the ouster of the Marcos administration, and that there was no way to accurately estimate the wealth acquired by the Marcoses since the 1950s when he was in the legislature, and the mid-1960s when he became president. Estanislao suggested that the figure could be closer to $30 billion.

== Means of acquisition ==
Among the sources of the Marcos wealth are alleged to be diverted foreign economic aid, US Government military aid (including huge discretionary funds at Marcos disposal as a "reward" for sending some Filipino troops to Vietnam) and kickbacks from public works contracts over a two-decade-long rule.

According to Jovito Salonga in his book Presidential Plunder—which details Salonga's time as head of the Presidential Commission on Good Government—these cronies helped the Marcoses amass his wealth by aiding him in one or more of what Salonga called "Marcos' Techniques of Plunder".

These techniques, says Salonga, were:

1. creating monopolies and putting them under the control of cronies;
2. awarding behest loans to cronies from Government banking or financing institutions;
3. forced takeovers of various public or private enterprises, with a nominal amount as payment;
4. direct raiding of the public treasury and government financing institutions;
5. Issuance of Presidential Decrees or orders, enabling cronies to amass wealth;
6. kickbacks and commissions from enterprises doing business in the Philippines;
7. use of shell corporations and dummy companies to launder money overseas;
8. skimming off of Foreign Aid and other forms of International Assistance; and
9. hiding wealth in overseas bank accounts using pseudonyms or code names.

In 1992, Imelda Marcos claimed without evidence that Yamashita's gold accounted for the bulk of the family wealth.

== Agency in charge of recovery ==
Shortly after Marcos was removed through the 1986 People Power revolution, a quasi-judicial government agency named the Presidential Commission on Good Government was created, with the primary mandate of recovering ill-gotten wealth accumulated by the Marcoses, their relatives, subordinates, and close associates, whether located in the Philippines or abroad. It was also tasked with investigating other cases of graft and corruption; and instituting of corruption prevention measures.

Two years later in 1998, the Comprehensive Agrarian Reform Law mandated that the funds recovered by the PCGG be automatically appropriated to fund the Philippines' agrarian reform programs. Since then, assets recovered from the Marcoses by the PCGG has funded more than 80 percent of the Philippines' budget for agrarian reform. On January 28, 2013, the Philippine Congress enacted the Human Rights Victims Reparation and Recognition Act of 2013 (Republic Act No. 10368). Through this law, the Philippine government acknowledged its moral and legal obligation to recognize and/or provide reparation for the victims of human rights violations during the Marcos regime. For this purpose, Congress allocated ₱10 billion from funds transferred to the Philippine government by virtue of the December 10, 1997, Order of the Swiss Federal Supreme Court, adjudged by the Supreme Court of the Philippines as final and executory in Republic vs. Sandiganbayan on July 15, 2003, (G.R. No. 152154) as Marcos ill-gotten wealth and forfeited in favor of the Republic of the Philippines.

== Overseas real estate properties ==
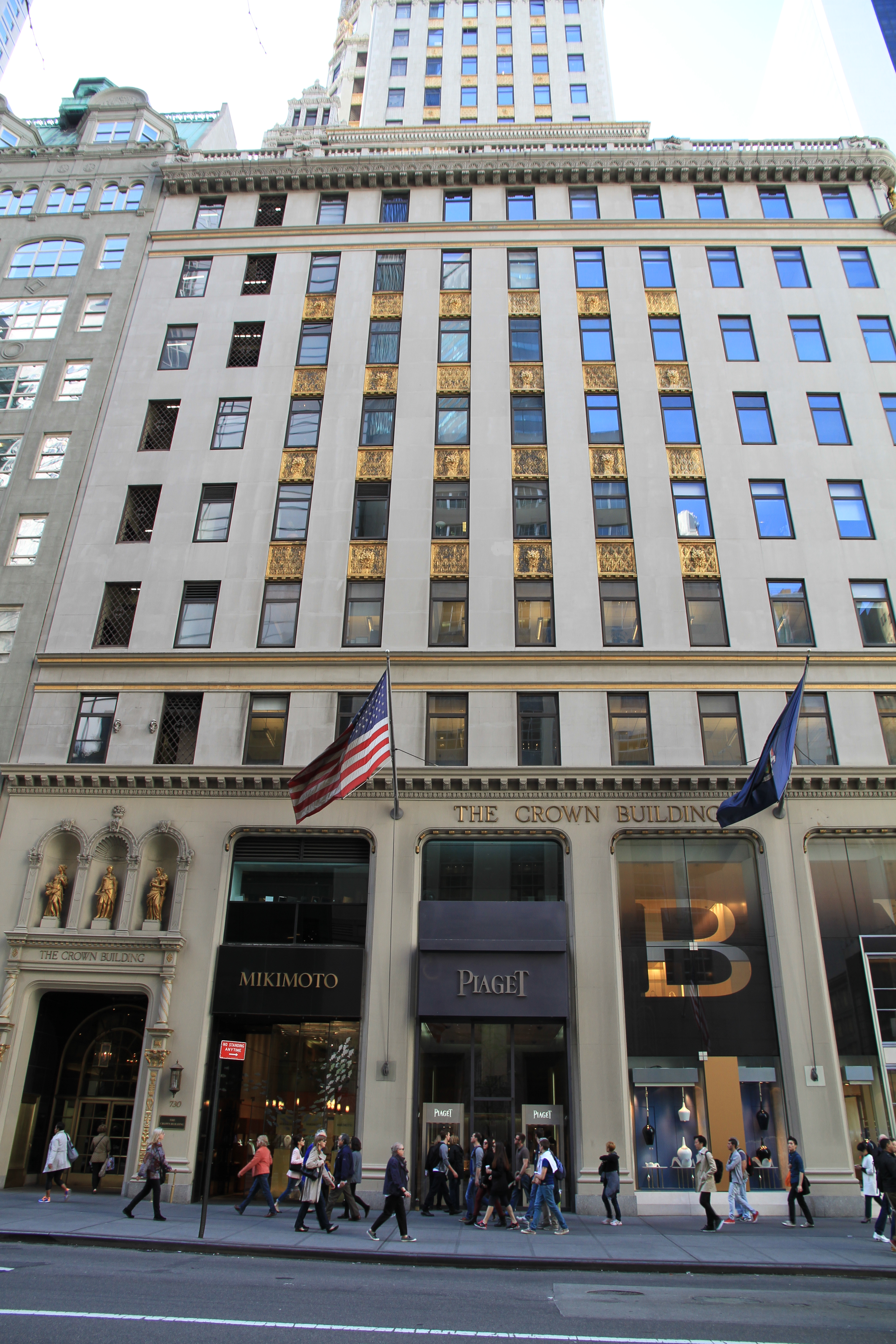
A 2013 image of the Crown Building, one of four Manhattan buildings purchased by the Marcoses in the early 1980s.

Some of the most tangible examples of the unexplained wealth of the Marcos family are the various overseas real estate properties that the Marcoses acquired while they were in power.

The best known of these properties are the Marcoses' multi-million dollar real estate investments in the United States, particularly Imelda's purchases of buildings and real estate in New York, the estates purchased in New Jersey for the use of the Marcos children, Jose Yao Campos's investments in Seattle, various properties in Hawaii including the Makiki Heights estate where they lived during their exile, and their ownership of the California Overseas Bank in Los Angeles. According to Ricardo Manapat's book Some Are Smarter Than Others, which was one of the earliest to document details of the Marcos wealth, lesser known properties include gold and diamond investments in South Africa, banks and hotels in Israel, and various land-holdings in Austria, the United Kingdom and Italy.

Many of these properties are to have been acquired under the name of several Marcos cronies. One of them, Campos, cooperated with the Philippine Government and made an immunity deal, revealing how he fronted Marcos' investments both locally and abroad via numerous inter-locking shell corporations.

== Marcos mansions in the Philippines ==
Aside from the overseas properties, there are fifty-or-so "Marcos mansions" acquired by the Marcos family within the Philippines itself. Locations of these "Marcos mansions" include properties in Philippines' "Summer Capital" of Baguio, in the Ilocos region where the Marcoses trace their ancestry, Leyte where Imelda Marcos's family came from, and throughout the Greater Manila Area and its outskirts.

Some of these properties are titled in the name of Marcos family members, but others are titled in the name of identified "Marcos cronies" while being reserved for the use of the Marcos family. In some cases, several such mansions were located close together, with specific mansions meant for individual members of the family, as was the case of the Marcos mansions on Outlook Drive in Baguio. Many of the Marcos mansions were sequestered by the Philippine government when the Marcoses were expelled from the country as a result of the 1986 EDSA Revolution.

== The Marcos jewels ==
Also sequestered by the PCGG in 1986 were three sets of Imelda Marcos's jewelry, which have collectively come to be known as the "Marcos jewels" or "Imelda jewels."

Individually, the three collections of jewels sequestered by the PCGG have come to be called the "Hawaii collection", the "Malacañang collection", and the "Roumeliotes collection", respectively. The "Hawaii collection" refers to a group of jewels seized by the US Bureau of Customs from the Marcoses when went into exile in Hawaii in 1986. The "Malacañang collection" refers to a group of jewels that were discovered in the Presidential Palace after the Marcoses fled the Philippines. The "Roumeliotes collection" refers to a group of jewels that were confiscated from Demetriou Roumeliotes—said to have been a close associate of Imelda—after he was caught trying to smuggle them out of the Philippines at Manila International Airport.

In February 2016, the government of the Philippines announced that the three collections had been appraised as valuing ₱1 billion, and that they would eventually be auctioned off after having been kept unsold by the government for three decades.

== Overseas bank accounts ==
Much of the Marcos wealth that the PCGG has been trying to recover is kept in various overseas bank accounts, which the PCGG was able to identify based on documents left by the Marcoses in Malacañang in February 1986. Marcos opened his first bank account by depositing $215,000.00 in Chase Manhattan Bank in New York City on July 7, 1967.

=== The William Saunders and Jane Ryan accounts ===
The most famous of these overseas accounts of the Marcoses are the four so-called William Saunders and Jane Ryan accounts, opened with Credit Suisse in Zürich in March 1968. Marcos famously used the alias "William Saunders" for the name of the account, while Imelda Marcos choose the alias "Jane Ryan." Four checks, totaling US$950,000.00 were used to make the initial deposit. These were later moved into other accounts under various dummy foundations, but when records of them were discovered by the new Philippine government after the 1986 EDSA revolution, the Swiss Federal Council froze them. On December 21, 1990, the Swiss Federal Supreme Court ruled that these accounts could be turned over to the Philippine government, on the condition that there be a concurring "final and absolute judgment" by a Philippine court. In 1997, the Swiss Federal Supreme Court established the funds to have been "of criminal provenance" and permitted their transfer to an escrow account in Manila, pending a ruling from a Philippine court that came in the form of a confiscation ruling by the Philippine Supreme court on July 15, 2003. Switzerland finally released a total of $683 million in Marcos funds to the Philippines Treasury in 2004.

=== The Arelma account ===
Aside from the Saunders account, another well known overseas account of the Marcoses is known as the Arelma account, opened in 1972 at the brokerage firm of Merrill, Lynch, Pierce, Fenner & Smith, Inc. in New York under the name of the Arelma Foundation, a Panamanian corporation. The initial deposit had been for only $2 million in 1972, but the account had grown to approximately $35 million by 2000, and $42 million by 2014.

=== Compromise deal accounts ===
Among the early successes of the PCGG were achieved through compromise deals with Imelda Marcos or various Marcos cronies. Banks involved included Japan's Sanwa Bank, and in the United States, Redwood Bank and California Overseas Bank.

== Status of recovery efforts ==
As the Marcos family fled to Hawaii after the EDSA Revolution, the opposition organized themselves and President Aquino released Executive Order 1 on February 28, 1986, which was the creation of the Presidential Commission on Good Government (PCGG), with Jovito Salonga as its chair. The task of the PCGG was to recover all assets and moneys amassed by the Marcoses, relatives, and cronies.

The first attempt to recover was organized by Salonga, Sedfrey Ordoñez, Charlie Avila, and General Jose Almonte, and was called Operation Big Bird. Armed with documents recovered in Manila after the revolution, the committee worked with the European banking systems and Swiss government to recover the money hidden at Swiss banks. Operations Big Bird as formulated by Gen. Almonte was to use Filipino bankers in Europe to double-cross the Marcoses in issuing a special power of attorney (SPA) to move their money from possible investigation by Philippine, and European governments. While $7 billion of accounts were identified, this mission was only successful in transferring $356 million from Marcos' connected accounts to the Philippine government accounts. Sensing the double-cross, the Marcos withdrew their SPA, and the Swiss Attorney-General ordered the freezing of the rest of the accounts until the Philippine government can prove that these accounts belong to the Filipino people.

The recovered money ballooned to $570 million by 1998, when it was transferred from Switzerland to a Philippine National Bank escrow account. In 2003 the Philippine Supreme Court released a decision with finality that the said money was considered public fund. President Gloria Macapagal Arroyo in accordance to the law declared that the said money was to be used for the agricultural sector and agrarian reform. However, as 2004 elections were round the corner, the said funds were allegedly used for funding the campaign of Arroyo and her party-mates and allies; this was to become known as the Fertilizer Fund scam.

By 2019, the PCGG had recovered more than ₱171 billion of ill-gotten wealth from the Marcoses and their cronies since their creation in 1986; some of this came from money sequestered by the PCGG or surrendered under various compromise agreements, and some of it came from the sale of various surrendered or sequestered properties. By 2020 it had become ₱174 billion.

== Convictions ==
Philippine Supreme Court and Sandiganbayan decisions as well as rulings by courts abroad confirm the plunder of Ferdinand Marcos, his family, and cronies. The Supreme Court has issued three separate rulings ordering the Marcoses to return the wealth stolen from the country. In 2003, the Supreme Court ordered the transfer to the Philippine government of the Marcoses' Swiss bank accounts worth $658 million.

The Supreme Court also affirmed in 2012 the decision of the Sandiganbayan to forfeit $3.3 million assets and funds previously held by Arelma, Inc., one of Ferdinand Marcos's dummy companies.

In 2014, the Sandiganbayan ruled that the Malacañang Jewelry Collection was part of the Marcoses' ill-gotten wealth. The Supreme Court affirmed in 2017 the Sandiganbayan's forfeiture of the Malacañang Collection, which included Imelda Marcos's ill-gotten jewelries.

In 2018, the Sandiganbayan found Imelda Marcos guilty beyond reasonable doubt in seven criminal cases. She was sentenced to imprisonment of up to 77 years.

In 2019, the Sandiganbayan ordered the forfeiture of ill-gotten paintings and other art worth $24.3 million. The art collection included Sandro Botticelli's 1485 painting Madonna and Child.

In 2021, the Sandiganbayan ordered the return of stolen funds worth ₱96 million and $5.4 million plus interest. According to the court decision, the funds were received from Marcos and his cronies from 1974 to 1986 and held by Royal Traders Holding Co.

In 2024, the Supreme Court ruled as ill-gotten a 57.68-hectare property in Paoay, Ilocos Norte, and ordered the return of the property to the state.

=== Convictions outside the Philippines ===
Courts abroad have issued separate rulings on the stolen wealth of the Marcoses. In 1986, US courts ruled against the Marcoses relating to ill-gotten assets in New York and New Jersey.

In 1990, the Swiss Federal Supreme Court convicted the Marcoses of using Swiss bank accounts to hide stolen wealth worth $356 million during the dictator's rule.

== Acquittal ==
- On September 21, 2018, the Supreme Court affirmed the 2008 ruling of the Court of Appeals that acquitted Imelda over her dollar salting case in which she allegedly stole millions of dollars in Swiss accounts. She was acquitted from 32 counts of dollar salting in 2008.
- On June 27, 2023, the Sandiganbayan acquitted Ferdinand Marcos, his wife Imelda Marcos, and several of their associates on their ill-gotten wealth case due to the failure of prosecution "to prove its allegations by preponderance of evidence."
- As of February 2025, nine court cases on the Marcoses' stolen wealth were dismissed during the presidency of Bongbong Marcos.

== Disinformation ==
Studies on disinformation state that the denial of the Marcos kleptocracy is a common theme of disinformation campaigns and "networked propaganda".

False claims about the source of Marcos stolen wealth have circulated, including conspiracy theories about the Tallano gold and the Yamashita treasure. One pervasive false claim states that Imelda Marcos had "won every corruption case" against her. President Rodrigo Duterte had also made unsubstantiated claims that the Marcos family planned to give away their wealth, without mentioning the Marcoses' corruption cases.

Sources of the false claims include social media influencers, Facebook pages, and YouTube channels, as well as Marcos family members and their cronies.

== See also ==
- Economic history of the Philippines (1965–86)
- Corruption in the Philippines
- Marukosu giwaku
- Marcos mansions
- Overseas landholdings of the Marcos family
- Marcos jewels
- 1Malaysia Development Berhad scandal (Malaysia)
