= Corruption in the Philippines =

Corruption in the Philippines is a widespread problem its citizens endure, which emerged and developed during the Spanish colonial period. According to GAN Integrity's Philippines Corruption Report updated May 2021, the Philippines suffers from many incidents of corruption and crime in many aspects of civic life and in various sectors. Such corruption risks are rampant throughout the state's judicial system, police service, public services, land administration, and natural resources. The 2025 Corruption Perceptions Index scored the Philippines at 33 out of 100 points, on a scale from 0 ("highly corrupt") to 100 ("very clean"). When ranked by score, the Philippines ranked 120th among the 182 countries in the 2025 Index, where the country ranked first is perceived to have the most honest public sector. The Philippines's score was significantly worse than the regional average of 45 and the worldwide average score of 42. Corruption involves the abuse of public power for private gain, manifesting in various forms like bribery, fraud, and kickbacks, which can lead to significant financial losses for a country and damage public trust. It can occur at different levels, from individual acts to systemic issues, and can involve the corruption of events, processes, or culture. Laws like the Philippine Anti-Graft and Corrupt Practices Act and the United Nations Convention against Corruption aim to combat these issues through prevention, prosecution, and international cooperation.

Examples of corruption in the Philippines include graft, bribery, cronyism, nepotism, impunity, embezzlement, extortion, racketeering, fraud, tax evasion, vote buying, lack of transparency, lack of sufficient enforcement of laws and government policies, and consistent lack of support for human rights.

Researchers have proposed corruption and poor governance as among the causes of poverty in the Philippines.

The Philippines signed the United Nations Convention against Corruption on December 9, 2003, with the Senate ratifying the convention on November 6, 2006. In 2012, the Senate declared that National Anti-Corruption Day shall be celebrated yearly on December 9.

== Perceived decline and resurgence ==
Transparency International's Corruption Perceptions Index scores a list of countries on a scale from 0 ("highly corrupt") to 100 ("very clean"), then ranks them by score. The country ranked first is perceived to have the most honest public sector. In 2012, President Benigno Aquino concluded that, according to Transparency International, the factors driving the progress in the Philippines' Corruption Perception Index scores at that time were improved government service and reduced red tape. Between 2012 and 2014, the Philippines's score rose from 34 to its highest-ever score of 38.

A November 2020 Transparency International survey of nearly 20,000 citizens from 17 countries, surveyed mostly between June and September 2020, showed that Filipinos have more confidence in their government's tackling of corruption than their Asian neighbors, although they also believe corruption in government remains a big problem. Of Philippine respondents 64% thought that corruption had decreased in the last 12 months, while 24% believed that it had increased. This was better than the average across Asia, where only 32% believed that corruption had decreased and 38% said that it had increased. But in contrast, Transparency International reported the Philippines as a "significant decliner" in the score for the region in 2021 and 2022; the country dropped to a score of 33 in those years from its 2014 high of 38.

The 2025 Corruption Perceptions Index scored the Philippines at 32. When ranked by score, the Philippines ranked 120th among the 182 countries in the 2025 Index. For comparison with regional scores, the best score among those countries of the Asia Pacific region that appeared in the Index (Note: Afghanistan, Australia, Bangladesh, Bhutan, Brunei Darussalam, Cambodia, China, Fiji, Hong Kong, India, Indonesia, Japan, North Korea, South Korea, Laos, Malaysia, Maldives, Mongolia, Myanmar, Nepal, New Zealand, Pakistan, Papua New Guinea, Philippines, Singapore, Solomon Islands, Sri Lanka, Taiwan, Thailand, Timor-Leste, Vanuatu, Vietnam) was 84, the average score was 45 and the worst score was 15. For comparison with worldwide scores, the best score was 89 (ranked 1), the average score was 42, and the worst score was 9 (ranked 181, in a two-way tie).

== Plunder, graft, and malversation ==
Under the dictatorship of Ferdinand Marcos, the total amount of the fortune that the Marcos family stole is estimated at $10 billion. The Supreme Court of the Philippines has issued three separate rulings ordering the Marcoses to return the wealth stolen from the country.

The Anti-Plunder Law (Republic Act 7080) was signed into law after the dictatorship of Ferdinand Marcos was toppled in the 1986 People Power Revolution. The law was filed in the Senate by Senator Jovito Salonga and in the House of Representatives by Representative Lorna Verano-Yap. The measure was signed into law by President Corazon Aquino in 1991. Salonga said that previous laws against corruption "were clearly inadequate to cope with the magnitude of the corruption and thievery committed during the Marcos years".

In 1997, the first plunder case was filed against tax official Dominga Manalili. She and two others were convicted of plunder in 2001 by the Quezon City Regional Trial Court for diverting ₱260 million of tax payments to unauthorized bank accounts.

In 2001, President Joseph Estrada and incumbent San Juan Mayor Jinggoy Estrada became the first elected officials to be charged with plunder. Joseph Estrada was accused of pocketing ₱4 billion in jueteng bribes and tobacco excise taxes. He was convicted of plunder by the Sandiganbayan anti-graft court in 2007 and later pardoned by President Gloria Macapagal-Arroyo.

In the 2004 Global Transparency Report by Transparency International, Estrada, together with Ferdinand Marcos, made it into the list of the World's All-Time Most Corrupt Leaders in the World. Marcos was second on the list while Estrada was listed tenth.

In 2012, the Philippine Office of the Ombudsman filed a ₱366-million plunder case against Arroyo over the alleged misuse of intelligence funds assigned to the Philippine Charity Sweepstakes Office. In 2013, Arroyo and Janet Lim Napoles were charged with plunder over the Malampaya fund scam. In 2023, Arroyo was charged before the Ombudsman for the alleged misuse of ₱38 billion from the Malampaya fund.

In 2014, incumbent senators Bong Revilla, Jinggoy Estrada, and Juan Ponce Enrile along with Janet Lim–Napoles were charged with plunder before the Sandiganbayan for allegedly pocketing kickbacks in the pork barrel scam.

As of 2016, there have been 33,772 cases of corruption filed before the Sandiganbayan. Of these, 10,094 are malversation cases and 7,968 are graft cases.

In 2025, Vice President Sara Duterte was impeached by the House of Representatives over multiple charges, including allegations of malversation of ₱612.5 million in confidential funds, bribery, and unexplained wealth. In 2026, multiple impeachment complaints were filed against Duterte alleging, bribery, and betrayal of public trust, graft and corruption, including the misues of confidential funds, while an impeachment complaint was filed against President Bongbong Marcos on the alleged betrayal of public trust relating to corruption on the government's flood control projects.

=== Stolen wealth of the Marcos family ===
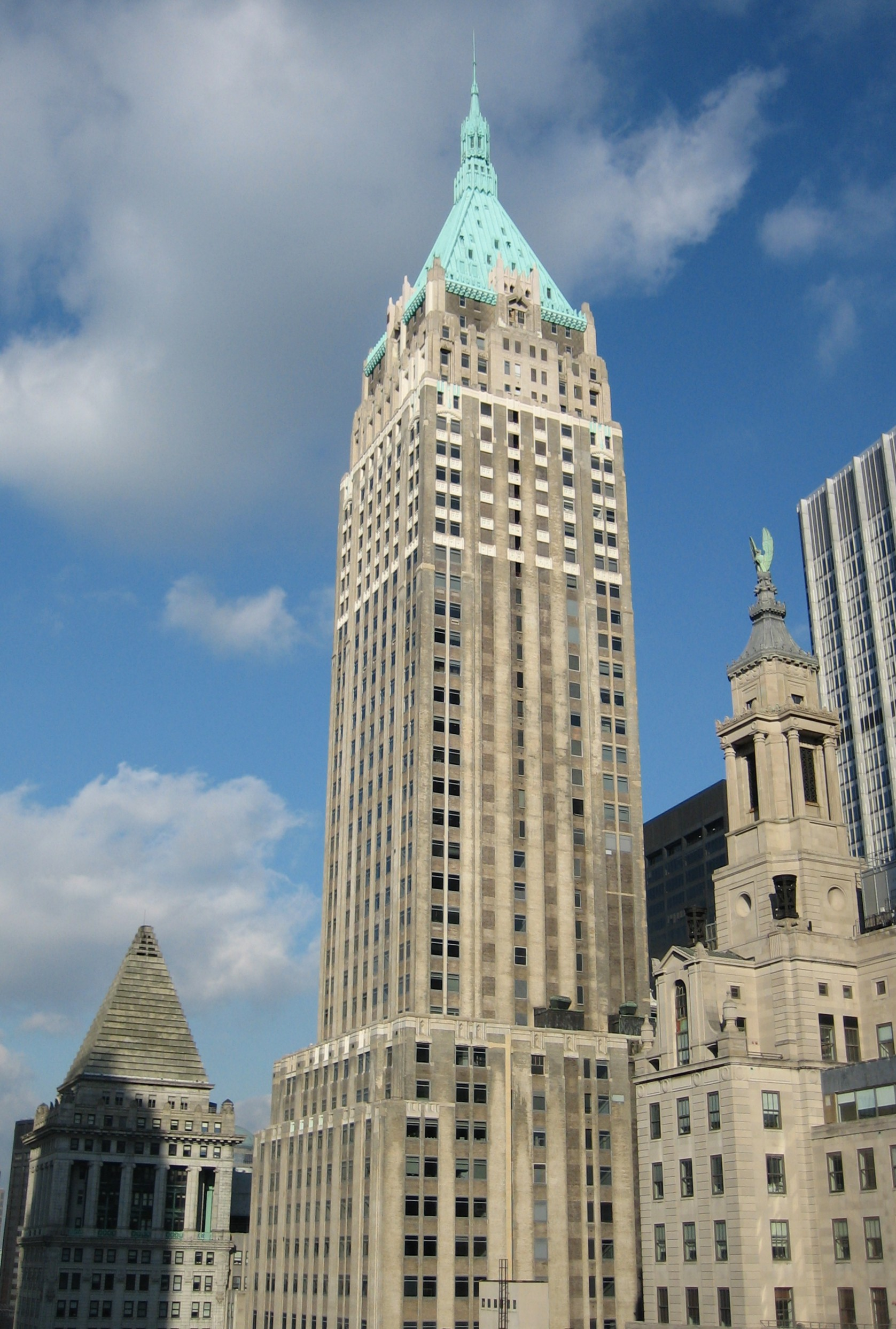
A 2005 image of 40 Wall Street, one of four Manhattan buildings purchased by the Marcoses in the early 1980s.

The Marcos family, a political family in the Philippines, owns different assets that Philippine courts have determined to have been acquired through illicit means during the presidency of Ferdinand Marcos from 1965–1986. These assets are referred to using several terms, including "ill-gotten wealth" and "unexplained wealth," while some authors such as Belinda Aquino and Philippine Senator Jovito Salonga more bluntly refer to it as the "Marcos Plunder".

Legally, the Philippine Supreme Court defines this as the assets the Marcoses acquired beyond the amount legally declared by Ferdinand and Imelda Marcos in the president's statements of assets and liabilities—which amounts to only about US$13,500.00 from his salary as president. The court also deems that such wealth should be forfeited and turned over to the government or to the human rights victims of Marcos's authoritarian regime. Estimates of the amount the Marcoses reportedly acquired in the last few years of the Marcos administration range from US$5 billion to $13 billion. No exact figures can be determined for the amount acquired through the entire 21 years of the Marcos regime, but prominent Marcos-era economist Jesus Estanislao has suggested that the amount could be as high as US$30 billion.

Among the sources of the Marcos wealth are alleged to be: diverted foreign economic aid (e.g. Marcos Japanese ODA scandal), US Government military aid (including huge discretionary funds at Marcos disposal as a "reward" for sending some Filipino troops to Vietnam) and kickbacks from public works contracts over a two-decades-long rule.

This wealth includes: real estate assets both within the Philippines and in several other countries, notably the United States; collections of jewelry and artwork; shares and other financial instruments; bank accounts, both in the Philippines and overseas, notably Switzerland, the United States, Singapore, and the British Virgin Islands; and in some instances, actual cash assets.

Some of this wealth has been recovered as the result of various court cases, either as funds or properties returned to the Philippine government, or by being awarded as reparations to the victims of human rights abuses under Marcos's presidency. Philippine Supreme Court, Sandiganbayan, and courts abroad have issued convictions or rulings that confirm the plunder of Ferdinand Marcos and Imelda Marcos, Marcos family members, and cronies. Some of the stolen wealth has been recovered by the Philippine government through settlements and compromise deals, either with the Marcoses themselves or with cronies who said that certain properties had been entrusted to them by the Marcoses. Some of the recovery cases have been dismissed by the courts for reasons including improper case filing procedures and technical issues with documentary evidence. An unknown amount is not recoverable because the full extent of the Marcos wealth is unknown.

== Corruption in the police service and armed forces ==
The police and the military in the Philippines pose a high risk of corruption, with the Philippines National Police (PNP) considered to be one of the most corrupt institutions in the country. There are several reports of national police officers and members of the military engaging in criminal activities such as extortion, corruption and involvement in local rackets. Private businesses also report that they cannot solely rely on the support of the police and half of them choose to pay for private security.

According to CNN Philippines, Police Commissioner Sombero was under investigation in a corruption case for allegedly facilitating a ₱50 million bribe from gambling tycoon Jack Lam, who tried to bribe immigration authorities to release approximately 1,300 Chinese nationals who were working in his resorts illegally.

=== Pabaon scandal ===
The 2011 Armed Forces of the Philippines corruption scandal, also known as the "pabaon scandal", was a political scandal involving the alleged misuse of military funds by high-ranking members of the Armed Forces of the Philippines (AFP). The pabaon system referred to a practice of giving millions of pesos to chiefs of staff when they retire.

An estimated PHP1.5 billion in AFP funds for operations and salaries were allegedly placed anomalously in an unaudited pool of discretionary resources. Under the system, AFP general Carlos Garcia was alleged to have plundered PHP303 million as head of the comptroller's office while former AFP chief of staff Angelo Reyes was alleged to have received PHP50 million as send-off money.

The scandal led to the recommendation of filing of plunder charges against six retired generals and five other officers in January 2012. The Philippine Department of Justice named the following in its recommendation to the Office of the Ombudsman: AFP chiefs Roy Cimatu and Diomedio Villanueva; retired military comptrollers Garcia and Jacinto Ligot; retired major general Hilario Atendido; former brigadier general Benito de Leon; retired lieutenant colonel Ernesto Paranis; active-duty officers Cirilo Tomas Donato and Roy Devesa; former civilian auditor of Divina Cabrera; and former accountant Generoso del Castillo.

== Corruption in the judicial system ==
Corruption in the Philippine judicial system is also a major problem. Bribery and irregular payments in return for favorable judicial decisions are quite common. Although judicial officials are independent by law, rich and powerful groups and individuals wield control and influence over the judicial system and influence the outcomes of civil and criminal proceedings. Financial investment dispute often take an unnecessarily long time due to staffing shortages, lack of resources, and corruption in the court system. The low salaries of judicial officials help exacerbate the problem of bribery in exchange for favors. The judiciary is also criticized for making non-transparent and biased judicial decisions.

=== ₱6 million bribery case ===
In 2024, the Supreme Court ordered the 90-day preventive suspension of Pasay City judge Albert Cansino and a court employee for allegedly accepting a bribe for a favorable ruling in a civil case. Both were entrapped in bribery with the use of five ₱1,000 marked bills and ₱6 million boodle money.

== Political nepotism and cronyism ==
The Philippine political arena is mainly arranged and operated by families or alliances of families, rather than organized around the voting for political parties. Called the padrino system, one gain favor, promotion, or political appointment through family affiliation (nepotism) or friendship (cronyism), as opposed to one's merit. The padrino system has been the source of many controversies and corruption in the Philippines.

According to the Civil Service Commission (CSC), nepotism is a form of corruption or abuse of authority that violates Article IX (B), Section 2 (2) of the Constitution which states that "Appointments in the civil service shall be made only according to merit and fitness to be determined, as far as practicable, and, except to positions which are policy-determining, primarily confidential, or highly technical, by competitive examination." Nepotism favors a few individuals and compromises fairness in the hiring and promotion process in government.

=== Campaign finance ===
Campaign finance in the Philippines is regulated under several laws, including the Omnibus Election Code and the Synchronized Elections Law (Republic Act No. 7166). The law prohibits persons or organizations with government contracts from contributing to candidates' campaigns. Corporations may donate up to 5% of their taxable income under COMELEC Resolution No. 10772 and the Corporation Code of the Philippines.

In 2025, amid the flood control projects scandal in the Philippines, Chiz Escudero was ousted as Senate president after a witness testified that Escudero received a campaign contribution of ₱30 million from a top contractor for government flood-control projects. In the 2022 elections, elected officials who received millions in campaign contributions from contractors include President Bongbong Marcos, Vice President Sara Duterte, and senators Win Gatchalian, Loren Legarda, Robin Padilla, and Migz Zubiri. Despite the COMELEC ban on giving or receiving donations from contractors, Glenn Escandor gave Sara Duterte a donation for her campaign. Escandor's Esdevco Realty Corporation paid for advertisements worth ₱19.9 million (US$404,060.91) for Sara Duterte's 2022 campaign for vice president. Genesis88 Construction Inc., also owned by Escandor, was a major contractor for the DPWH during Rodrigo Duterte's presidency. Rudhil Construction & Enterprises owner Rodulfo Hilot Jr. gave ₱20 million to Marcos's campaign, while Quirante Construction owner Jonathan Quirante contributed ₱1 million. Rudhil Construction & Enterprises and Quirante Construction were awarded substantial government contracts after the elections.

Spending limits are set at ₱10 per voter for presidential and vice-presidential candidates, ₱3 per voter for local candidates, and ₱5 per voter for political parties and independent candidates. Candidates and political parties must submit an itemized Statement of Election Contributions and Expenditures (SOCE) within 30 days after election day. Failure to submit the SOCE bars candidates from assuming office. Watchdog groups such as LENTE, Kontra Daya, and the Institute for Political and Electoral Reform monitor compliance through SOCE and SALN reviews.

Vote buying remains a persistent issue. COMELEC defines it as giving or promising money, jobs, favors, or items of value in exchange for votes. It is a punishable election offense under Article 12 of the Omnibus Election Code. Enforcement is weak and violators are rarely punished. In 2025, the European Union Election Observation Mission described vote buying in the Philippines as "endemic" and "well-entrenched."

In 2025, Vote Report PH recorded instances of improper use of government resources, alleging that incumbent officials used Ayuda sa Kapos ang Kita Program (AKAP) to endorse candidates or party-list groups during the election campaign period, constituting misuse of public resources. COMELEC issued 200 show-cause orders against candidates in the 2025 elections over allegations of vote-buying, vote-selling, and abuse of state resources.

== Political dynasties ==
Political dynasties have been blamed for worsening corruption in the Philippines. According to the Catholic Bishops' Conference of the Philippines, "political dynasties breed corruption and ineptitude" because political power is monopolized by political dynasties. Corruption can be through plunder, bribery, unmerited government contracts, or misallocation of funds.

The dominance of powerful families have also allowed politicians facing corruption charges to get elected into public office and escape accountability.

== Ghost projects ==
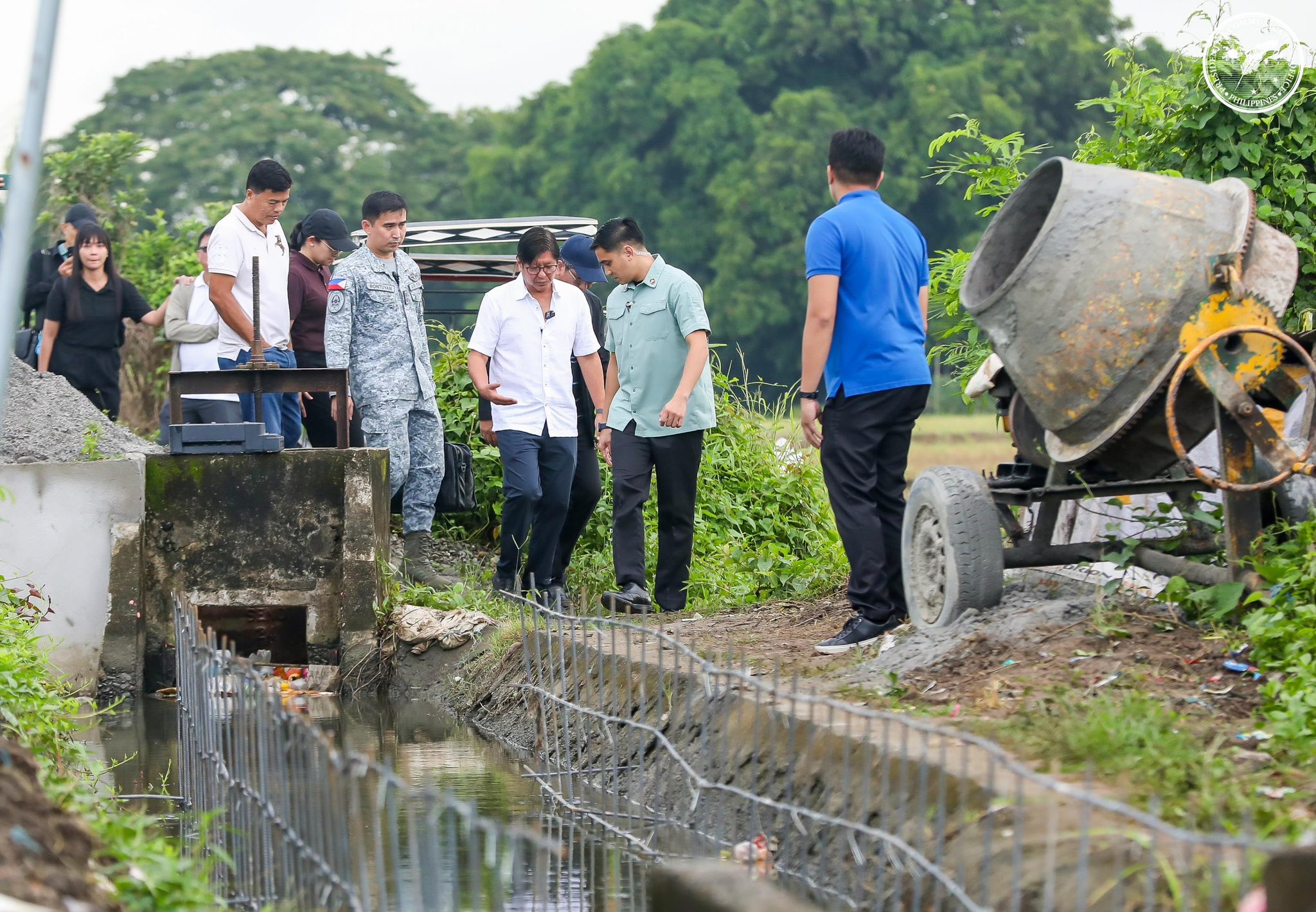
421 flood control projects found to be ‘ghosts'

In the Philippines, ghost projects refer to government-funded projects that are reported as completed but do not actually exist or remain unfinished. These projects are often associated with corruption, in which public funds are allegedly used for personal gain. In October 2025, the Department of Public Works and Highways reported interim results from an ongoing joint investigation carried out by it and the Armed Forces of the Philippines, the Department of National Defense, and the Department of Economy, Planning, and Development: out of 8,000 flood control projects investigated, 421 had been found to be ghost projects. The interim report noted that 100,000 flood control projects had not yet been investigated.

Trillions of pesos may have been lost due to corruption from substandard, overpriced, or uncompleted infrastructure projects in the Philippines, according to estimates by the Department of Public Works and Highways (DPWH). Among those implicated are high-ranking officials, including Congress Representative Sandro Marcos and former House Speaker Martin Romualdez, both relatives of the President, and DPWH officials. Protests against corruption have called for the resignation of President Bongbong Marcos and Vice President Sara Duterte and for the jailing of senators and members of the House of Representatives.

== See also ==
- Human rights in the Philippines
- Extrajudicial killings and forced disappearances in the Philippines
- List of political scandals in the Philippines
- Philippines Truth Commission
- Independent Commission for Infrastructure
- Unexplained wealth of the Marcos family

General

- Crime in the Philippines
- International Anti-Corruption Academy
- Group of States Against Corruption
- International Anti-Corruption Day
- ISO 37001 Anti-bribery management systems
- United Nations Convention against Corruption
- OECD Anti-Bribery Convention
- Transparency International
