= Jocelyn Bolante =

Filipino politician

Undersecretary for Finance and Administration of the Department of Agriculture
- In office 2001 – September 6, 2004
- President: Gloria Macapagal Arroyo

Personal details
- Born: Joecelyn Isada Bolante; August 27, 1951 (age 73)
- Political party: Ugyon Kita Capiz (2010)
- Occupation: Politician

Jocelyn "Jocjoc" Isada Bolante (born August 27, 1951) is a Filipino politician who formerly served as an Undersecretary of the Department of Agriculture of the Philippines. He was implicated by the Philippine Senate to the ongoing investigation related to corruption concerning fertilizer funding while serving as a government official. Bolante left the Philippines on December 11, 2005. He returned to the Philippines on October 28, 2008, after being detained at an immigration office in the United States. The corruption related to fertilizer funds was exposed when news broke that a Filipino journalist, Marlene Garcia-Esperat (who was from Tacurong City, Sultan Kudarat, Philippines), was killed on March 24, 2005.

== Personal profile ==
A native of Dao, Capiz, Bolante was born to parents Vicente Bolante, Sr. (deceased) and Salvacion Isada (deceased). He has three siblings, namely Vicente Jr., Anabelle and Cecilia.

== Political career ==
Bolante was appointed by President Gloria Macapagal Arroyo as Undersecretary of Agriculture for Finance and Administration in 2001. He served in this capacity for almost three years. He resigned on September 6, 2004.

Bolante ran unsuccessfully for governor of his home province of Capiz in the 2010 general elections under the local party Ugyon Kita Capiz (Unite Capiz), where he was defeated by incumbent governor Victor A. Tanco. The said party endorsed the Nacionalista Party and supported presidential candidate Senator Manny Villar and his running mate Senator Loren Legarda on the same year.

== Corruption case ==
Bolante was implicated by the Philippine Senate to a fertilizer fund scam which amounts to P728 million. Based on his statements, the fund was "taken from" the Department of Agriculture's "2003 budget and distributed to local government officials (105 congressmen, 53 governors, 23 mayors) as project proponents two weeks before the 2004 elections, and was believed to have been diverted to the campaign pot of President Gloria Arroyo."
