= Tallano gold =

Conspiracy theory in the Philippines

Tallano gold refers to a set of interrelated conspiracy theories and internet scams. It is commonly claimed that a vast trove of gold was owned by a so-called Tagean Tallano family before Spanish colonization of the Philippines. The myth is often invoked to allegedly explain the source of the Marcos family's unexplained wealth.

== Background ==
The Tallano gold story claims that before Spain colonized the Philippines, the archipelago and surrounding territories were ruled by a certain Tagean Tallano family, that the family owned a vast amount of gold, and that former president Ferdinand Marcos obtained his family's unexplained wealth by receiving some of the Tallano gold as payment for the legal services he allegedly provided to the Tallano family. Offshoots of the conspiracy theories include tales that the country's national hero José Rizal came to the possession of the gold and bequeathed it to Marcos, that the gold reserves were used to fund the Vatican, or that the gold was instrumental in starting the World Bank.

A related conspiracy theory is that the Tallano clan has provided 400,000 metric tons (390,000 long tons; 440,000 short tons) of gold as commission to former President Ferdinand Marcos who became its "sole owner". The gold bars supposedly fell under the custody of the Bangko Sentral ng Pilipinas (BSP), the country's central bank.

During the 2022 Philippine presidential election, the myth of the Tallano gold was circulated by social media pages supporting Bongbong Marcos, son of Ferdinand. In his presidential campaign, the younger Marcos shrugged off the claims, remarking in an interview held on March 15, 2022, with One News, that he had not seen a single gold bar in "his entire life." The BSP also released a statement that it had no record of keeping "Tallano gold bars".

== See also ==
- Yamashita's gold
