= Marlene Garcia-Esperat =

Filipino journalist

Marlene Garcia Esperat
- Born: Marlene Garcia; August 29, 1959; Mindanao, Philippines
- Died: March 24, 2005 (aged 45); Tacurong, Sultan Kudarat
- Occupation: Investigative journalist

Marlene Garcia Esperat (August 29, 1959 – March 24, 2005, in Tacurong City, Sultan Kudarat, Philippines) was a Filipina whistleblower and investigative journalist who wrote a weekly anti-graft column for local newspapers. As a result of her anti-corruption work, she was murdered in her own home.

== Biography ==
Garcia-Esperat's career in journalism began accidentally: in the early 1990s, she was an analytical chemist for the Department of Agriculture, when she discovered that her laboratory was not receiving the funding it had been allocated. Inspired by the example of her first husband, Severino Arcones, a journalist who was murdered in 1989, Garcia-Esperat began her public activities. She also spent two years in the witness protection program due to her ombudsman discoveries.

Her case is significant, as it is the first of the 56 murders of Filipino journalists since 1986 for which the people ultimately responsible were identified, in addition to the people directly involved. Esperat, as former employee of the Department of Agriculture in Central Mindanao (DA-12) and Midland Review, Tacurong City columnist, exposed the alleged Jocelyn "Jocjoc" Bolante fertilizer funds scam, in which President Gloria Macapagal Arroyo was implicated.

Two weeks after the killing, Randy Grecia (one of the lookouts) surrendered to police, and subsequently pleaded guilty. Grecia and his three accomplices (Estanislao Bismanos and Gerry Cabayag, who likewise pleaded guilty, and Rowie Barua, who has become a state witness) have testified that they were hired by two officials in the Philippines Department of Agriculture of Central Mindanao. Murder charges were filed, but later dismissed.

The Esperat family lawyer, Nena Santos, told the Manila Standard that the dismissal of charges was "highly questionable and suspicious," and that it was a "miscarriage of justice." The case was re-filed. The Cebu court convicted and meted out life imprisonment to Randy Garcia, Gerry Cabayag, and Estanislao Bismanos who admitted they were hired for P120,000 to kill Esperat.

On February 4, 2008, the Department of Justice (DOJ) ordered the reopening of the investigation against alleged masterminds Osmeña Montaner and Estrella Sabay of the Department of Agriculture (DA) who were earlier excluded from the charges of killing Esperat by the Regional Trial Court in Tacurong City.

Esperat's sister, Valmie Garcia Mariveles, who re-filed the charges against Montañer and Sabay, gathered more evidence. Accordingly, on September 28, 2008, Cebu City RTC Branch 7 Judge Simeon Dumdum approved the withdrawal of charges at the Cebu City Court for filing of murder case, instead against the alleged 2 masterminds before the Tacurong City RTC. Also, on October 20, 2008, the Department of Justice (Philippines) refiled the murder charges, in Tacurong City against Osmeña Montañer and Estrella Sabay, DA-12 finance officer and accountant, respectively, as masterminds. The New York Committee to Protect Journalists welcomed the issuance of arrest warrants by Tacurong City, Sultan Kudarat Regional Trial Court Judge Melanio S. Guerrero of Branch 20 against the 2 accused, amid the case hearing on October 27, 2008. Tacurong RTC Judge Melanio Guerrero ordered the 2 accused to file a response within 10 days. The 2 DA officials, however, filed a motion to dismiss or to quash the case.

== See also ==
- Extrajudicial killings and forced disappearances in the Philippines
- List of journalists killed under the Arroyo administration
