= Lloyd Christopher Lao =

Filipino-Chinese Lawyer

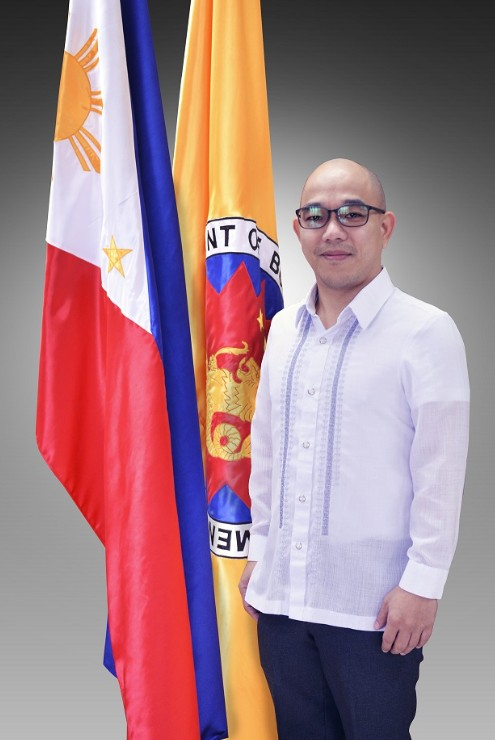

Undersecretary for Procurement Service - Department of Budget and Management
- In office January 2, 2020 – June 2021
- President: Rodrigo Duterte

Chief Executive Officer and Commissioner of the Housing and Land Use Regulatory Board (HLURB)
- In office 2018 – June 2019
- President: Rodrigo Duterte

Undersecretary of the Presidential Management Staff – Office of the Special Assistant to the President
- In office June 31, 2016 – April 2017
- Appointed by: Rodrigo Duterte

Personal details
- Born: Lloyd Christopher Abellana Lao Davao City
- Education: Ateneo de Davao University

Lloyd Christopher Abellana Lao is a Filipino-Chinese lawyer from Davao City, and former Undersecretary for the Procurement Service of the Department of Budget and Management during the administration of President Rodrigo Duterte. Lao was figured in a number of controversies during the Duterte administration, such as the Pharmally Scandal.

== Early life ==
Lloyd Christopher Lao was born in Davao City and earned his law degree from Ateneo de Davao University. He is a member of the Lex Talionis Fraternity, the same fraternity that former President Rodrigo Duterte belongs to. Lao joined the faculty of the university.

Prior to the Duterte administration, Lao was an Arbiter at the Housing and Land Use Regulatory Board for Southern Mindanao.

During the 2016 Presidential Elections, Lao became a volunteer lawyer to the campaign of Duterte.

== Duterte administration ==
=== Office of the Special Assistant to the President ===
Upon assumption of his presidency, Rodrigo Duterte issued Executive Order No. 1, tasking the Special Assistant to the President, Christopher Lawrence "Bong" Go, to oversee the Office of the Special Assistant to the President, which in turn would supervise the Presidential Management Staff as well as the Office of the Appointments Secretary. Go was appointed as Secretary, while Lao was appointed as Undersecretary.

Lao was then appointed as vice-chairman of the Presidential Search Committee of the Office of the Special Assistant to the President. The role practically gave Lao the power to scrutinize any appointees to the bureaucracy as directed by Sec. Go.

=== Housing and Land Use Regulatory Board ===
Duterte appointed Lao as Chief Executive Officer and Commissioner of the Housing and Land Use Regulatory Board in 2018. As CEO, he was later figured in an extortion case filed at the Presidential Anti-Corruption Commission by real estate developers.

=== Department of Budget and Management ===
Duterte appointed Lao as Executive Director and Undersecretary to the Procurement Office of the Department of Budget and Management (PS-DBM) on January 2, 2019. The said office would oversee the Philippine Government Electronic Procurement System

As chief of PS-DBM, Undersecretary Lao lead the agency's role during the COVID-19 pandemic, procuring Personal Protective Equipment, facemasks, and COVID-19 testing kits.

== Controversies ==
=== Philippine Navy frigate procurement scandal ===
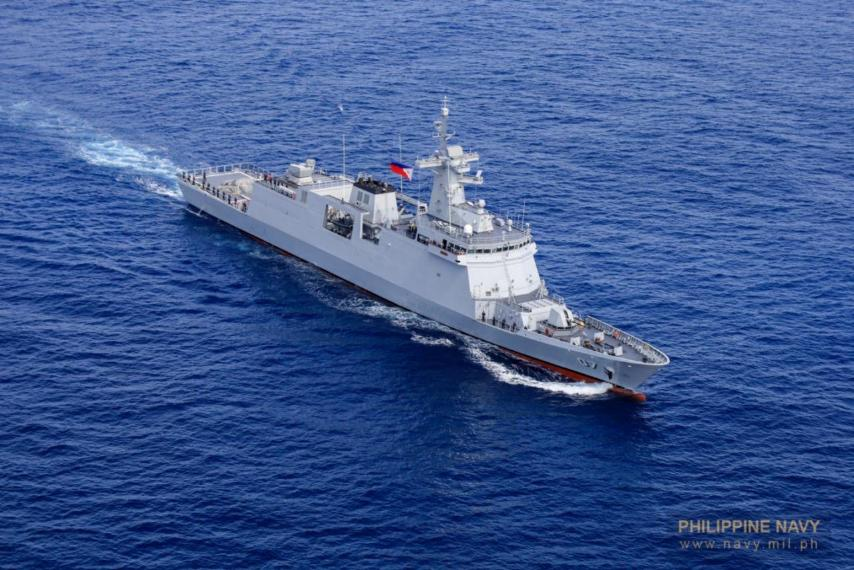
BRP Diego Silang

On December 18, 2017, news broke out that Philippine Navy Flag Officer-in-Command Vice Admiral Ronald Joseph Mercado, who was supposed to serve until his retirement until March 2018, was abruptly relieved by the Armed Forces of the Philippines, Chief-of-Staff, Gen. Rey Leonardo Guerrero. The official confirmation of Mercado's relief was issued by the Armed Forces of the Philippines the following day. AFP spokesperson Col. Edgar Arevalo informed that the AFP was simply following instructions from higher authorities, and the reasons for Mercado's relief will be given in due time. Mercado would be replaced by RAdm. Robert Empedrad, as Acting Flag Officer-in-Command.

News within the day would detail that Mercado's abrupt relief came after his clash with Department of National Defense officials over the PhP 15.7 billion Frigate Acquisition Project (FAP). The FAP was already signed and awarded during the Pres. Benigno Aquino's administration to Hyundai Heavy Industries (HHI) for the building of two frigates. However, delays in the construction was mainly in the final selection of the Combat Management System. (CMS)

The CMS preferred by the Philippine Navy's Technical Working Group for the FAP was the Tacticos of Nederlands Thales, as this already had a proven Link 16 operability, which was used by the Philippine Navy and its allies. HHI was pushing for the Hanwha Thales CMS, which was used by the Republic of Korea Navy. Defense Secretary Delfin Lorenzana would later admit that Mercado was relieved due to insubordination and his causing of the delay in the selection of the CMS, as he was pushing for Tacticos.

The Philippine Daily Inquirer was able to acquire documents where it proved that Malacanang already had special interest in the FAP as early as January 2017. Sec. Lorenzana sent a note to the Philippine Navy to respond to Special Assistant to the President Sec. Bong Go's question on the CMS preference. Lorenzana's letter had an attached unsigned letter from Go, criticizing the selection of Tacticos by the Philippine Navy, and raised the positive features of Hanwha's Naval Shield Integrated Combat Management System. Sec. Go's letter also included a white paper from Hanwha.

Lao confirmed the authenticity of Sec. Go's letter to Sec. Lorenzana, and it was normal procedure for their office to take action when they receive a complaint. The complainant in this case at the OSAS and Presidential Management Staff was HHI over the preference of the Philippine Navy for Tacticos. Lao also confirmed that they have invited RAdm. Empedrad, who at that time was the chief of the Technical Working Group of the FAP, to Malacañang Palace to provide clarification on the matter.

The fallout put Go's influence and Lao's actions under scrutiny, causing the relief of a career naval officer, Mercado. President Duterte would extend himself and defend Go from the issue. Go offered to resign, but Duterte refused this. Mercado later defended Go and said he never had any discussion with Go over Hanwha or the FAP.

During the Congressional hearing of August 2021 on the COVID-19 pandemic government procurements, Probinsyano Ako Cong. Jose Bonito Singson would question Lao on his involvement in the FAP fiasco. Lao denied knowing anything about the issue twice. Cong. Singson presented a letter written by Lao to the RAdm. Empedrad on the CMS procurement. Lao would correct himself, confirm he wrote the letter, and admit that he was involved in the FAP mainly to address the complaint of the HHI.

On August 6, 2024, former Senator Antonio Trillanes IV, a former Philippine Navy officer, filed a plunder case against former President Rodrigo Duterte, Sen. Bong Go, Defense Undersecretary Raymundo Elefante, former Navy Flag Officer-in-Command Vice Admiral Empedrad, and Lao.

=== Extortion at the Housing and Land Use Regulatory Board ===
The Presidential Anti-Corruption Commission received an anonymous complaint, and this was passed on to Sec. Eduardo del Rosario, about the Department of Human Settlements and Urban Development in September 2019. Del Rosario only passed the information to the staff of Lao for their proper response to the commission. Lao mentioned that he was not aware of this. Sen. Risa Hontiveros replied that it was impossible for Lao not to know about the complaint, since Sec. Del Rosario required him to respond to the accusation accordingly.

=== Department of Education laptop scam ===
The Department of Education planned in supplying entry-level laptop computers to more than 65,000 teachers across the country, and secured a budget of PhP 2.4 billion. The bidding was passed to the PS-DBM headed by Lao. During the 2022 Senate Blue Ribbon Committee headed by Sen. Francis Tolentino, the investigation uncovered that the PS-DBM procured overpriced laptops at PhP 58,300 per unit. PS-DBM recommended the price, with Department of Education approving it. The total overprice would amount to PhP 979 million. The ombudsman would rule that graft charges would be filed against Lao and Department of Education Secretary Leonor Briones.

=== Pharmally scandal ===
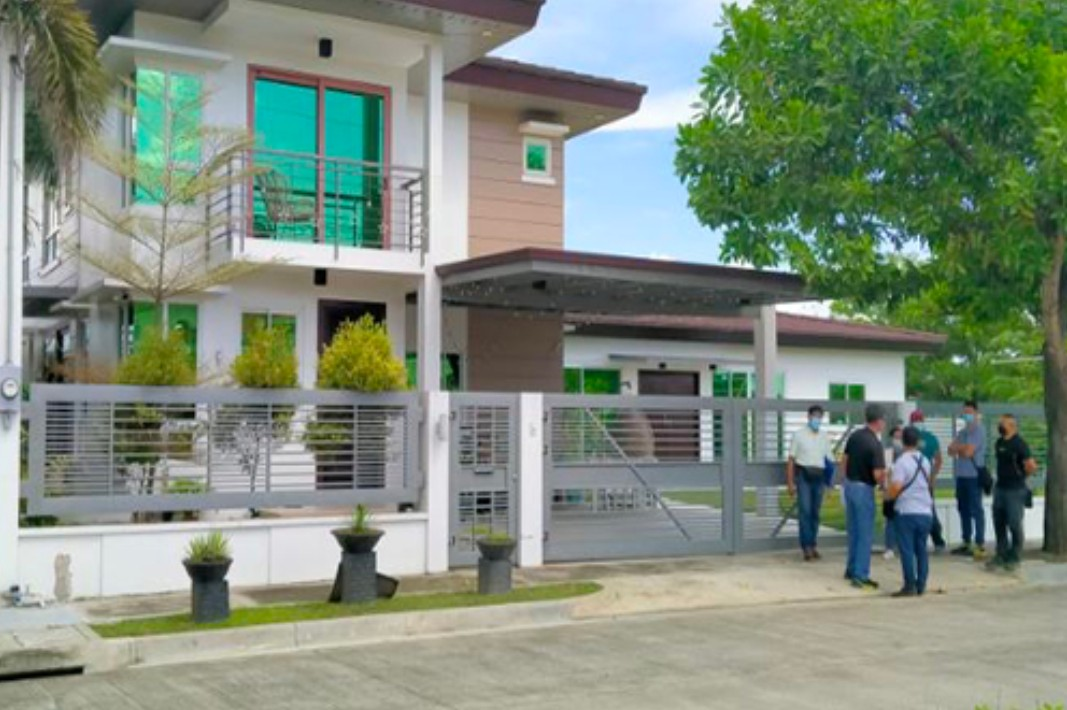
Senate's Office of the Sergeant-at-Arms attempts to serve the warrant of arrest Saturday, November 13, 2021, to former DBM Undersecretary Lao at his Davao residence in Le Jardin Subdivision.

Lao would gain prominence during the Senate Blue Ribbon Committee hearing on the Pharmally Scandal in the middle of 2021 headed by Sen. Richard Gordon, during the Senate Presidency of Sen. Tito Sotto. ThePharmally Pharmaceutical Corporation was established in September 2019 with a paid up capital of PhP 625,000.00. Lao would favor Pharmally with contracts that would amount to the PhP 11 billion - the single largest recipient of government contracts during the pandemic.

By the end of August 2021, the Senate Blue Ribbon Committee would uncover that the scam would not have been possible had it not been supported by top ranking government officials in the Executive Branch. Sen. Franklin Drilon would expose the link between Lao and Pharmally. The PS-DBM would purchase from Pharmally overpriced items such as facemask and COVID-19 test kits.

Sen. Bong Go meanwhile would deny that Lao was his aide, and that he was simply a volunteer lawyer of the Duterte campaign during the 2016 Presidential Elections, and later joined the Presidential Management Staff. However, the staff was placed under the Office of the Special Assistant to the President, by the issuance of Duterte's Executive Order No. 1, which was headed by Go.

Pres. Duterte on the other hand would defend Lao, and confirmed that he was his fraternity brother, a member of his campaign team, and also helped his office when he was the mayor of Davao City. Duterte would add that he appointed Lao as a debt of gratitude, and defended that decision as executive prerogative that should never be questioned.

Investigators from the Office of the Ombudsman would uncover that Lao approved the transfer of funds from the Department of Health for a 4% service fee amounting to at least P1.65 billion. The ombudsman found Lao and Department of Health Secretary Francisco Duque III guilty of injury to the government, and forfeited all their retirement benefits and perpetual disqualification from reentering government

On September 14, 2021, the Department of Justice issued an Immigration Look Out Bulletin Order on Lao and his co-accused over the Pharmally Scandal.

=== Statements of Assets, Liabilities, & Net Worth Increase ===
During the Senate Blue Ribbon Committee Hearing, Sen. Drilon presented the Statements of Assets, Liabilities, & Net Worth of Lao, and took note that he had PhP 11 million increase in his five years receiving a government salary of PhP 100,000 to PhP 175,000 per month. Lao explained that he was able to sell some memorial lots he had in stock, and that there were an increase of death during the COVID-19 pandemic, as well as disposals of a golf club lots.

Sen. Imee Marcos also took note that Lao's income tax return indicated he had zero income from 2017 to 2019, despite being under government payroll.

== Arrest and aftermath ==
On September 12, 2024, the Sandiganbayan First Division issued an arrest warrant against Lao for violations of the Republic Act No. 3019 Anti-Graft and Corrupt Practices Act, for his involvement with Sec. Duque in the transfer of the Department of Health budget of PhP 41.4 billion to his office, the Procurement Service - Department of Budget and Management.

The Criminal Investigation and Detection Group was able to track Lao in Ecoland in Davao City on September 17, 2024, and served him the arrest warrant, and detain him briefly. The bail however was set at PhP 90,000.00.

On January 10, 2025, the Office of the Ombudsman indicted Lao, Warren Liong, and Pharmally officials over the PhP 4 billion procurement of Personal Protective Equipment by the government.

The mbudsman also filed a graft case against Lao and Briones over the PhP 2.4 overpriced laptops on July 11, 2025. Lao and Briones pleaded not guilty to the charges.

In response the DBM announced also their full cooperation with the ombudsman over the Pharmally case, and also indicated that Lao is no longer connected with the agency.

On August 14, 2025, Lao submitted a plea of "not guilty" at the Sandiganbayan to the PhP 4.16 billion graft charge covering the Pharmally Scandal.

Newly appointed Ombudsman, Jesus Crispin Remulla, pulled back on 4 of the 6 the cases on the Pharmally scam on October 14, 2025, citing the need to reevaluate the details and evidences.

== See also ==
- Pharmally scandal
- Bayanihan to Heal as One Act
- Jose Rizal-class frigates
