= Belinda Aquino =

Scholar and activist about Philippine issues

Belinda Aquino is a Filipino academic, author, and civil and women's rights activist best known for having founded the Center for Philippine Studies at the University of Hawaiʻi at Mānoa, and for being one the United States' most prominent experts in the field of Philippine politics, power, and culture.

Born in the Ilocos region of Central Luzon, in the 1950s Belinda Aquino left her hometown as a young college-aged girl to attend university in Manila. It was there that she first exposed to activist circles, as student activism became more common in many of the social communities (e.g,. fraternities, sororities) located on campus.

After completing her undergraduate education, Belinda Aquino earned her master's degree in political science from the University of Hawai'i at Mānoa in the early 1960s. She then began working on a Ph.D. at Cornell University.

Although not related to prominent Marcos critic Benigno Aquino Jr., Aquino's stance on women's empowerment began as a community development worker in the 1970s, which included promoting the use of birth control and encouraging women to find employment instead of being housewives. Her being outspoken on the human rights abuses of the Marcos dictatorship led to her being put on the Marcos administration's watchlist while she was earning her Ph.D. in political science at Cornell University. It became too dangerous for her to go home to the Philippines, and so she eventually began teaching at the University of Hawaiʻi at Mānoa.

While she was working at the University of Hawaiʻi at Mānoa, the Hawai'i State Legislature passed a resolution requesting for the university to look into the possibility of establishing a center for Filipino studies in 1974. Belinda Aquino was part of the committee selected to look into this matter and advocated strongly for the creation of a Filipino studies hub on campus. When the Center for Philippine Studies was officially established, she was one of the founding members.

In 2012, Belinda Aquino established the Belinda A. Aquino International Philippine Study endowment in order to encourage scholarship at the University of Hawai'i at Mānoa in the fields of Philippine and Filipino studies. In particular, the endowment was designed to foster interdisciplinary and cross-cultural work which highlighted the Philippines as a "country in the Asia-Pacific region and a vibrant member of the international community." The head of the School of Pacific & Asian Studies, Edward J. Schultz, noted that the endowment reflected the "increasingly important role" which Filipinos were playing on an international scale, particularly within the islands of Hawai'i.

Her books on the ill-gotten wealth of Ferdinand Marcos, including "Politics of plunder: the Philippines under Marcos" (1987) and "The Transnational Dynamics of the Marcos Plunder" (1999) became important texts on the unexplained wealth of the Marcos family.

== See also ==
- Jovito Salonga
- Martial law under Ferdinand Marcos
