= Michael Yang =

Chinese businessman

- 杨鸿明
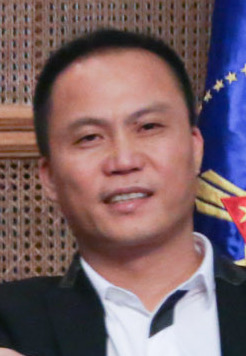
- Yang in 2017

Economic Adviser to the President
- In office January 1, 2018 – December 31, 2018
- President: Rodrigo Duterte

Personal details
- Born: Yang Hongming
- Citizenship: Chinese
- Relatives: Tony Yang/Antonio Lim (brother)
- Occupation: Businessman
- Known for: Economic advisor to President Rodrigo Duterte (2018)

Yang Hongming (Chinese: 杨鸿明), commonly known as Michael Yang in the Philippines, is a Chinese businessman who is an associate of Rodrigo Duterte, the 16th president of the Philippines. From 2016 to 2018, Yang served as president Duterte's economic adviser both informally and formally despite being constitutionally barred from holding a Philippine cabinet position. In 2020, Yang was linked in the Pharmally scandal which allegedly overpriced procurement contracts for medical supplies to be used by the Philippine government during the COVID-19 pandemic.

A native of Fujian, China, Yang moved to Davao City in the late 1990s. He became acquainted with Duterte in 1999 after requesting his permission to establish the Davao City Los Amigos (DCLA) mall in the city. In the 2000s, Yang established the real estate company Yangtze River Group in Davao, and by the 2010s was named chairman of the Full Win Group based in Xiamen, Fujian. By 2019, Yang and his business partners in Pharmally headed Paili Holding, a firm that constructed buildings for Philippine offshore gaming operators (POGO), and sometime after 2021, Yang was listed as co-owner of a property in Emirates Hills, Dubai that was purchased by his Pharmally business partner Lin Weixiong (Allan Lim).

Since his tenure as economic adviser was revealed in 2018, Yang's discreet position in the Duterte administration has been questioned and criticized, with him being denounced for his role in the proliferation of POGOs in the Philippines. He has since been accused of being involved in the country's illegal drug trade, with critics of Duterte alleging that the Philippine drug war was carried out in order to benefit a Davao City drug syndicate linked to Yang and Duterte. Yang departed from the Philippines in May 2024, heading to the United Arab Emirates.

== Education ==
Yang claimed on his website that he attended Princeton University where he obtained a doctorate degree in business administration. When asked to clarify, Yang said he obtained a "certificate" from Princeton and says that the American university runs a program through its branch in Beijing.

== Business career ==
Yang has been based in the Philippines for at least 20 years, becoming a permanent resident in the country since he moved to Davao City in the late 1990s. President Rodrigo Duterte claimed in 2019 that Yang was first introduced to him in 1999 (during his tenure as congressman) by Randy Usman, an ethnic Maranao lawyer, when Yang requested his permission to establish the Davao City Los Amigos (DCLA) shopping mall. Duterte alleged to have then warned Yang not to enter the illegal drug trade before he granted him permission to set up the DCLA. Yang's mall, named DCLA Uyanguren and situated along Ramon Magsaysay Avenue, was later opened in 2003.

He is a member of the Philippine Chinese Chamber of Commerce Labuan, the executive director of the Philippine Chamber of Commerce, the vice chairman of the China-Philippines Friendship, and the managing director of Fujian Normal University.

Yang was associated with Pharmally, which was involved in a scandal regarding the procurement of medical supplies for the COVID-19 pandemic.

== Political involvement ==
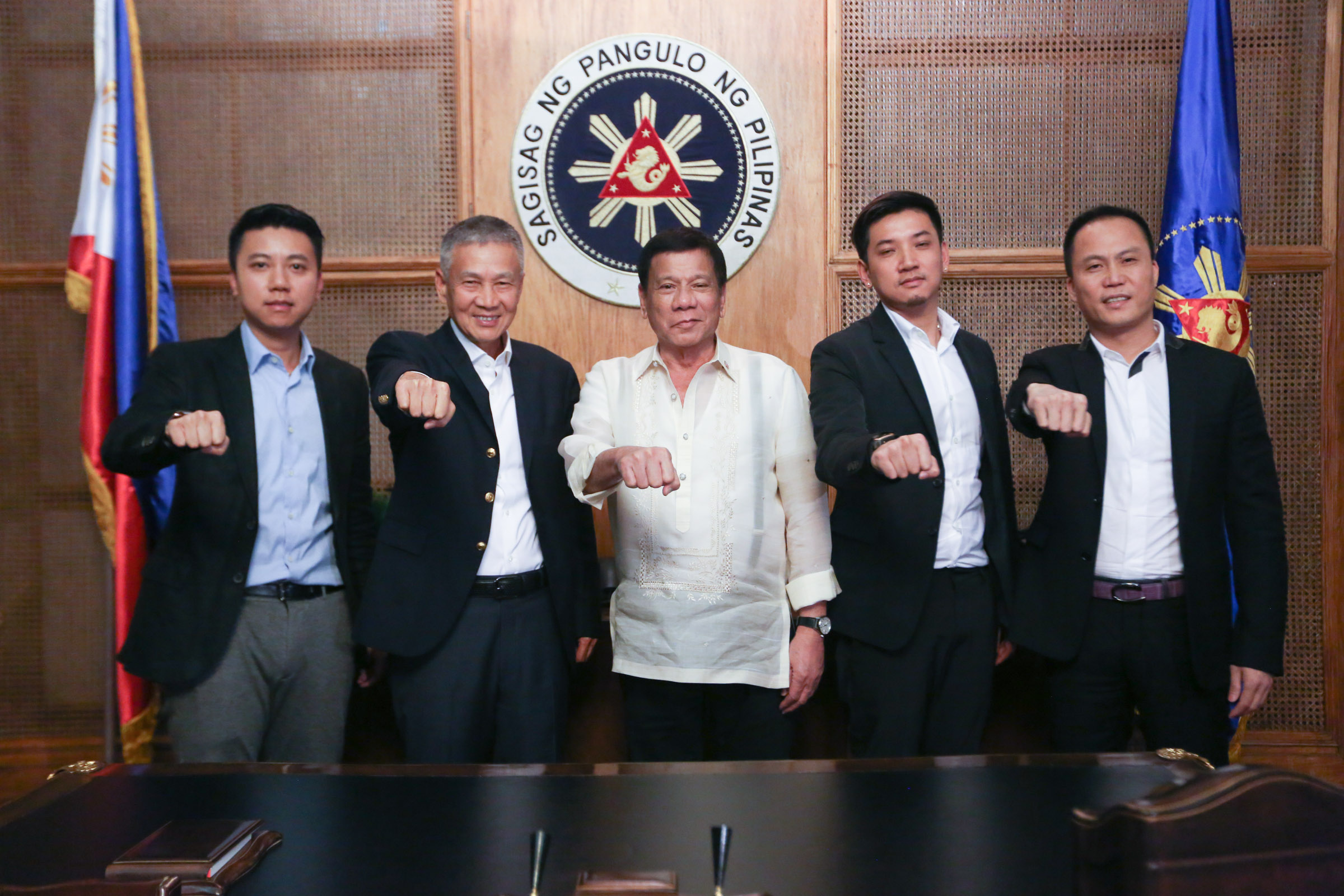
President Duterte with Michael Yang and a Chinese delegation posing with a Duterte Fist in Malacanang.

Around November to December 2015, during the run up to the 2016 Philippine Elections, mayor Rodrigo Duterte visited Yang at the headquarters of his company Full Win Group (or Fu De Sheng) in Xiamen, Fujian, China. Chinese social media documented this visit. A week later Duterte would formally announce his candidacy for President of the Philippines.

=== Presidential economic adviser ===
During the presidency of Rodrigo Duterte, Yang served as Duterte's economic adviser from 2016 to 2018. He was first designated the informal position in late 2016, and by 2018 entered into two six-month-long contracts in which he was formally named an economic adviser for the Duterte administration. His position was initially denied by Duterte, who argued that Yang's Chinese citizenship constitutionally bars him from holding a cabinet position. The two contracts were uncovered by the news site Rappler, which obtained them from the Malacanang Records Office through a freedom-of-information request. According to presidential legal counsel Salvador Panelo, he was tapped for the role due to his rags to riches background, connections to the Chinese government and knowledge on Chinese culture. Sometime after his designation, Yang established an office in Makati for his post, which was noted to have lavishly displayed the text "Office of the Presidential Economic Adviser" in the entrance. A websites for his position ("www.opea.com.ph") was also registered and used, but has since become inaccessible by October 2018.

According to Duterte, Yang maintains close relations to Chinese ambassador Zhao Jianhua and is part of the Chinese delegation to China. Despite his connections, Yang has explicitly denied being a member of the Chinese Communist Party or have influenced Duterte's foreign policy.

Duterte, who is noted for his war on drugs campaign, has cleared Yang of involvement in the illegal drug trade, using Yang's very connection to the Chinese government to dissuade the allegation believing that its officials would not associate with drug lords.

== Controversy ==
During the House of Representatives' quad committee hearing on September 27, 2024, Senior Deputy Speaker Aurelio Gonzales Jr. and Deputy Speaker David Suarez linked Michael Yang and his associate Lin Weixiong (or Allan Lim) to a "web of criminal activities", alleging that he used legitimate businesses in Davao, such as the DCLA mall, as fronts. Cong. Suarez presented a matrix of Yang and his businesses and associates, as well as their activities covering the Pharmally scam, illegal POGO hubs, kidnapping, extrajudicial killings, agricultural smuggling, and illegal drug trade.

=== Pharmally scandal ===
As the COVID-19 pandemic brought the Philippine economy to a lockdown, the government responded with the readjustment of the national budget under the Bayanihan to Heal as One Act. The act, which was passed by the Congress of the Philippines on March 23, 2020, and signed the following day would allow President Rodrigo Duterte to "reallocate, realign, and reprogram" a budget of almost ₱275 billion ($5.37 billion) to address the pandemic.

Pharmally Pharmaceutical Company was established September 2019 with only a paid-up capital of P625,000.

During the Philippine Senate hearing on the Pharmally scandal heading by Sen. Richard Gordon in September 2021, Yang was disclosed as the facilitator between Pharmally executives and President Duterte. Yang denied this and explained that he was sought by Pharmally executives, Lin Wei Xiong and Mohit Dargani, and provided assistance to meet President Duterte in Davao. Dargani was the Corporate Secretary, while Lin was the Financial Manager. As Yang was a no-show during the said senate hearing, the Senate ordered for his arrest.

Huang Tzu Yen, the President of Pharmally would later disclose that Yang was the financier and guarantor of their company. Yang denied this allegation.

=== POGO proliferation ===
Philippine Offshore Gaming Operator (POGO) business began in 2003, and significantly grew during the administration of President Duterte. POGO mainly operates an online gaming or casino license, targeting overseas players specifically in China. Duterte considered the POGO as a cornerstone of his economic policy, that during the COVID-19 pandemic he would declare POGOs as "essential services."

Yang's and his associate Lin Wei Xiong operated the Xionwei Technology Co. Ltd. in Bacoor, Cavite in August 2016, or two months into the Duterte presidency. Xionwei Technologies came into the news as the company took over the controversial pre-POGO operations of Jack Lam's Jimei International Entertainment which was operating out of Fontana Resort in Clark, Pampanga. Lam fled the Philippines in December 2019, when his company was found out to be employing 1,316 illegal Chinese workers. Philippine Amusement and Gaming Corporation (PAGCOR) revoked Jimei's license in Fontana and Fort Ilocandia, Ilocos Norte. Yang took over Jimei's facilities early 2020.

Yang's and his associate Lin Wei Xiong operated the Xionwei Technology Co. Ltd. in Bacoor, Cavite. Xionwei and another controversial POGO Lucky South 99 came out in the news in 2022 over kidnappings. The Philippine Senate investigated the matter, and the PAGCOR's CEO, Alejandro Tenco, committed to suspend the erring POGOs as well as run after illegal POGOs.

In the 2024 Philippine Senate Committee on Women, Children, Family Relations and Gender Equality hearing on the POGO hub in Bamban, Tarlac involving Alice Guo, the Court of Appeals froze the bank account of Yu Zhengcan, jointly held with Yang Hongjiang, Michael Yang's brother. Yu is one of the incorporators of the Hong Sheng Gaming Corporation, the POGO renting in the Baofu Compound, which was incorporated by Alice Guo.

=== Agricultural smuggling ===
During a Senate hearing on agricultural smuggling in October 2022, Senator Raffy Tulfo, asked Department of Agriculture officials if they knew of Michael Yang, Andrew Chang, Lea Cruz, and Manuel Tan, as these individuals have been indicated in the dossier of the Intelligence Division of the said department as well as Bureau of Customs. Tulfo claims that Chang, Cruz, and Tan have their own territories, while Yang could smuggle at any port. The smuggled vegetables came from China.

=== Allegations of drug smuggling during the Philippine drug war ===
In August 2017, a police anti-narcotics intelligence report made by Col. Eduardo Acierto mentioned Michael Yang and his associate Lin Wei Xiong (also known as Allan Lim) as the operator of a number of methamphetamine laboratories around Mindanao. Methamphetamine is locally known as "Shabu." The said report was then furnished to Philippine National Police Chief Ronald "Bato" dela Rosa, Philippine Drug Enforcement Agency (PDEA) Director Aaron Aquino, Police Deputy Director General Camilo Cascolan, as well as to Senator Richard Gordon, Executive Secretary Salvador Medialdea, and former Special Assistant to the President Christopher “Bong” Go.

Acierto mentioned that he submitted this report to warn President Duterte of his association with Yang. In a twist of events, in October 2018 Duterte cleared Yang, and tagged Acierto as one of the police officials who was involved in the illegal drug trade, and implicated him in the PhP 11 billion shabu haul concealed in magnetic lifters at the Manila International Container Port and in Cavite. Acierto was one of the police officials who was involved in the said raid which was the biggest drug haul in Philippine history. Acierto would go into hiding until 2024, as the Duterte administration would put a P10 million bounty on his head. Acierto would later tag Pres. Duterte, CPNP Dela Rosa, Bong Go, PDEA Director Aquino as protectors of Yang.

In November 2021, former Davao police investigator and self-confessed member of the Duterte Death Squad (DDS), Arturo Lascanas, gave an affidavit to the International Criminal Court (ICC), and pointed that Chinese businessmen who were close to then Mayor Rodrigo Duterte, Charlie Tan, Sammy Uy, and Michael Yang, were involved in drugs smuggling in Mindanao. Tan was previously named by former Senator Panfilo Lacson of being part of the "Davao Group" along with presidential son and Congressman Paolo "Polong" Duterte. The Davao Group, Lacson said, wielded strong influence over the Bureau of Customs (BOC). Paolo Duterte denied this but admitted that Charlie Tan was a drinking buddy. Lascanas also disclosed in his affidavit that former PNP Chief Dela Rosa, as well as PDEA Director Wilkins Villanueva, were "enablers" of the illegal drug trade. Yang denied this claim. PDEA Chief Villanueva also said during a succeeding Senate hearing that if Yang were involved in illegal drugs, he would have been long dead. Yang's lawyer, Raymond Fortun commented that Lascanas' claims are "without factual basis." The 186-page affidavit submitted by Lascanas to the ICC repeatedly mentioned that Duterte and Yang have operated methamphetamine laboratories around Mindanao.

On September 27, 2023, the PDEA, BOC, the National Bureau of Investigation (NBI), and the Bureau of Immigration (BI), conducted a joint operation in Bgy. San Jose Malino, Mexico, Pampanga, and raided a warehouse that netted the largest drug haul of the Marcos administration. Some 530 kilograms of Shabu was discovered, with a street value of PhP 3.6 billion.

During the investigation, the warehouse was identified to be owned by Empire 999 Realty Corporation, and the land where it was built was purchased from the brother of the former Mayor of Mexico, Pampanga, Teddy Tumang. The Philippine House of Representatives Quad Comm began reviewing on this drug haul May 2024.

On July 6, 2024, the Securities & Exchange Commission revoked the registration of Empire 999, and the board members disqualified to sit on the board of any corporation for the next five (5) years.

Former Senator Antonio Trillanes IV on July 30, 2024, accused former President Duterte in instigating the drug war to monopolize the drug trade in behalf of Yang. The drug war, according to Trillanes, was a ruse to kill off the competition.

On August 15, 2024, Jimmy Guban, former Intelligence Officer of the Bureau of Customs testified at the Quad Comm Hearing in Bacolor, Pampanga, that in 2017 he was approached by Davao City Councilor Nilo "Small" Abellera Jr., to intervene on shipments in behalf of Michael Yang, Davao Representative Paolo Duterte, and the husband of then Davao Mayor Sara Duterte, Mans Carpio. Guban was approached by Abellera a number of times mentioning Yang, Duterte, and Carpio as the owners of various shipments. Guban mentioned that it was his team that intercepted part of the PhP 11-billion drug haul hidden in magnetic lifters at the Manila International Container Port. He disclosed that prior to the Senate Investigation on the drug haul in September 2018, he was approached by journalist Paul Gutierrez who was working as a staff of the Department of Environment and Natural Resources (DENR) Undersecretary Benny Antiporda. Gutierrez warned him not to even mention the names of Yang, Duterte, and Carpio, and threatened him and his family. Gutierrez, who is currently the Undersecretary and Executive Director of Presidential Task Force on Media Security (PTFoMS), and Antiporda denied the claims of Guban.

=== Alleged involvement in extrajudicial killings ===
According to Arturo Lascanas' affidavit to the ICC the state-sponsored killings under the Davao Death Squad (DDS) was primarily targeting individuals who could potentially reveal Yang's drug trade and how Duterte gave protection. Lascanas would also disclose that the DDS was headed by Police Captains Royina Garma and Edilberto Leonardo, and its operational funds sourced from the city's peace & order, and intelligence budget. The budget were mainly disbursed by Mayor Duterte's Special Assistant, Bong Go, who Lascanas also claimed managed his own death squad. Lascanas mentioned that Yang and his associate Sammy Uy provided additional funds for the DDS.

Lascanas would also claim that then Mayor Duterte in person gave him instructions to kidnap Philip Lam in front of Michael Yang for the amount of PhP 350,000. Philip Lam was Yang's business rival. Duterte would later name Philip Lam as a drug lord in Mindanao during his weekly TV broadcast titled "Talk to the People."

On September 15, 2022, the Philippine National Police Anti-Kidnapping Force named three POGOs involved in kidnapping incidents during a Senate Hearing by the Committee on Public Order and Dangerous Drugs. These POGOs were Xionwei Technologies and LY Ground Admin in Cavite, and Lucky South 99 in Pampanga, all of whom were allegedly connected to Michael Yang.

== Personal life ==
Michael Yang has an older brother named Yang Jianxin, who also goes by the name Antonio Maestrado Lim. The elder Yang is a businessman based in Cagayan de Oro. Also a Chinese citizen, the elder Yang is found to have in possession of Philippine identity documents for himself. Sen. Risa Hontiveros also disclosed that Tony Yang has had transactions with Baofu Land, which is owned by the former Mayor of Bamban, Tarlac, Alice Guo or Guo Hua Ping.
