= Pharmally scandal =

Filipino scandal

- Logo of Pharmally Pharmaceutical Corp.
- Location: Philippines
- Participants: Pharmally Pharmaceutical Corp. (company involved); Senate Blue Ribbon Committee (investigation)
- Arrests: Linconn Ong; Twinkle Dargani; Mohit Dargani (all released)

Pharmally Pharmaceutical Corp. became involved in a scandal over allegations of overpriced medical supplies it supplied to the Philippine government for the latter's response to the COVID-19 pandemic. The Blue Ribbon Committee of the Senate of the Philippines launched an investigation into the matter and uncovered other issues, such as the supplied face shields' alleged substandard quality and how the company was able to secure a contract worth billions of pesos despite being founded only in 2019 with a small paid-up capital.

Several Pharmally officials were questioned by the Senate Blue Ribbon Committee. President Rodrigo Duterte's adviser Michael Yang was also among those whose role was probed. However, Duterte later barred Cabinet officials from participating in the hearings.

The issue led to a word war between President Duterte and Senator Richard Gordon.

In 2023, the Office of the Ombudsman found government executives guilty of administrative charges and recommended the filing of graft charges against several government and Pharmally executives.

== Background ==
=== Pharmally ===
Pharmally
- Founded: September 4, 2019; 6 years ago
- Headquarters: Taguig, Philippines
- Area served: Nationwide
- Key people: Huang Tzu Yen (Chair); Twinkle Dargani (President)
- Products: Face masks; face shields

Pharmally Pharmaceutical Corporation, simply known as Pharmally, is a supplier of medical equipment including face masks and face shields. According to the Securities Exchange Commission (SEC), the company was established on September 4, 2019. It had a paid-up capital of ₱625 thousand paid-up capital.

Based on its SEC documents, its headquarters is at the Fort Victoria Tower B in Fort Bonifacio, Taguig. Its chairman is Huang Tzu Yen, a Singaporean national who controls 40 percent of the company. The rest is held by Filipinos. Twinkle Dargani, who is the company president with 10 percent ownership; Mohit Dargani, the corporate secretary and treasurer with 30 percent ownership; Linconn Ong and Justine Garado who are both company directors. Ong has 16 percent stake while Garado has 4 percent.

=== Contracts ===
Nine contracts worth ₱8.68 billion were awarded to Pharmally despite its small paid-up capital. These were signed by Lloyd Christopher Lao, Department of Budget and Management (DBM) Procurement Service (PS) Officer in Charge since January 2, 2020, in which Pharmally would supply the government supplies for the COVID-19 pandemic including personal protective equipment, surgical masks, face shields and RT-PCR test kits.

The government's supply contracts for the COVID-19 pandemic response were funded under the Bayanihan to Heal as One and Bayanihan to Recover as One Act (Bayanihan 1 and 2 Acts). From March 2020 to September 2021, the Philippine Center for Investigative Journalism citing data from the Philippine Government Procurement Policy Board (GPPB) and the Philippine Government Electronic Procurement Service (PhilGEPS) reports that national and local government agencies awarded ₱10.85 billion worth of supply contracts to various companies. Pharmally were awarded the most contracts worth ₱18.8 billion or 29 percent of all the contracts given during the said period. Xuzhou Construction Machinery Group is the company with the second most awarded contracts. It had contracts worth ₱1.9 billion. The third most awarded company was Phil Pharmawealth, Inc. with contracts worth ₱1.81 billion.

Non-government organization Right to Know, Right Now! Coalition released a report that Pharmally's ₱10.85 billion contracts came from three agencies namely the Procurement Service-Department of Budget and Management (PS-DBM), the Department of Health (DOH), and Department of Transportation-Philippine National Railways (DOTr-PNR). They questioned why a relatively new company with a small paid-up capital such as Pharmally topped the GPPB's list of suppliers with the highest total contract by May 2020.

== Investigation ==
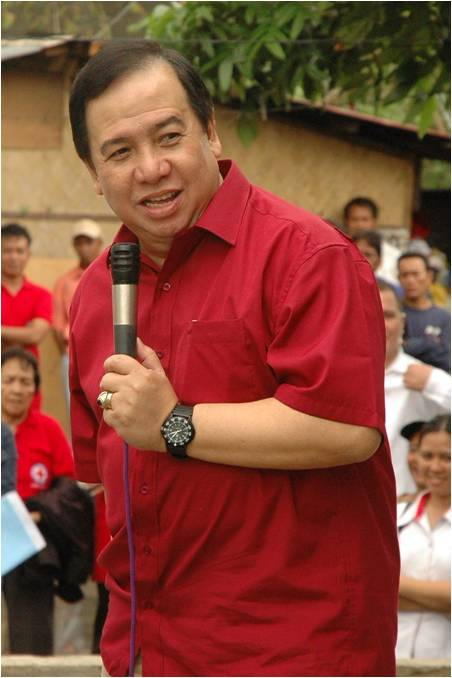
Senator Dick Gordon headed the Senate Blue Ribbon Committee which investigated Pharmally.

The Senate Blue Ribbon Committee, led by then-Senator Dick Gordon during the 18th Congress, held an investigation regarding the matter.

=== Participants ===
Among the Pharmally officials, employees, and other affiliated persons who participated in the investigations were:

==== Pharmally ====
- Huang Tzu Yen – Chair
- Twinkle Dargani – President
- Mohit Dargani – Secretary and treasurer
- lluminada Sebial – external auditor
- Krizle Grace Mago – company executive (until September 2021)

==== Other ====
- Michael Yang – Former presidential adviser to President Rodrigo Duterte
- Lloyd Christopher Lao – Undersecretary of the Department of Budget and Management and Procurement Service Officer in Charge (until June 2021).
- Rose Lin – 2022 House of Representatives election candidate for Quezon City's 5th district and wife of Chinese business Lin Wei Xiong, financial manager of Pharmally.

=== Michael Yang's and Lin Wei Xiong's involvement ===
Former presidential adviser of President Rodrigo Duterte, Michael Yang denied formal affiliation with Pharmally but admitted that the company sought his assistance. Through an interpreter, Yang said that he "didn't know the existence or whereabouts or anything" about the company but "later on they did approach him for some assistance". He was linked to the case after a 2017 video of him introducing Pharmally officials to Duterte in Davao City were put into limelight.

Pharmally chairman Huang Tzu Yen elaborated on Yang's role of being the financier and guarantor to Chinese suppliers on behalf of his company, contradicting director Linconn Ong's earlier statements.

The investigation found out that Lin Wei Xiong was the Pharmally's financial manager who was in Dubai and did not appear in the senate hearings. Chairman Huang said that Lin's role was to act as guarantor to suppliers in Yang's behalf. Rose Lin, the financial manager's wife made appearances to the Senate hearing instead. Rose described her husband's relationship with Yang as "business partners" in November 2021. She also disputed the intelligence report of former anti-drug police officer Eduardo Acierto that claimed that both Yang and Lin are linked to the illegal drug trade. In the report, Lin Wei Xiong was allegedly goes by the alias of "Allan Lim." She was also questioned by the Senate on how her husband acquired luxury cars namely a Lexus LX450D, a 2019 Toyota Alphard, and a 2020 Toyota Land Cruiser. She responded that she simply found those cars on their residence's garage one day.

In December 2024, the Organized Crime and Corruption Reporting Project reported that Yang and Lin Wei Xiong have invested 20 million dollars in Property real estate in Dubai.

=== Substandard face shields ===
In September 2021, Senator Risa Hontiveros presented a video of an alleged male Pharmally warehouse employee who claimed that the company directed them to supply face shields meant for healthcare workers even those that are "deformed, soiled and substandard". The man claimed that they were asked to repack deformed and dirty face shields and to replace the certificates of face shields dated 2020 with new certificates dated 2021. He said the practice was observed from August 2021, the time he was hired until the month the video was presented. Hontiveros said that the man made those claims under oath.

Former executive Krizle Grace Mago was asked by Gordon if Pharmally's practice of changing the displayed expiration dates of the face shields tantamount to "swindling" the government in the September 24, 2021 hearing. Mago admitted to the claim and said it was an order from Morhit Dargani. Dargani denied the claim suggesting that she wrongly named him due to being used to receiving instructions from him. Senator Francis Pangilinan suggested for Mago to be given security in exchange for giving the "whole truth".

Mago could not be contacted the following day. The National Bureau of Investigation was directed to find her whereabouts. She resurfaced on October 1, 2021, and was placed under protective custody at the Batasang Pambansa Complex of the House of Representatives due to fear for her life.

In the October 24, 2021 hearing, Mago recanted her statement that Pharmally "swindled" reasoning that she was forced to make a "pressured response" and that she was not "in the best frame of mind to think clearly" back in the September hearing. The senators were skeptical of Mago's recantment believing that the questions in the previous hearing were delivered in a calm manner and noted that the previous hearing was recorded in video. Mago left protective custody on November 15, 2021.

=== Financial records ===
Pharmally's financial records were also put under scrutinity. Illuminada Sebial, an external auditor was questioned by the senators found out that she was not given access to the actual documents and testified that she asked Pharmally to produce the documents concerned but to no avail. Accountant Jeff Mariano then was subject to a subpoena by the panel since they fail to extract any satisfactory information from Sebial.

The committee also attempted to find the whereabouts of boxes containing financial documents of Pharmally which they believe could give information on what the company's role in the pandemic supply procurement done by the Procurement Service of the Department of Budget and Management (PS-DBM). Former executive Krizle Grace Mago was questioned in November 2021 on this matter who said she did not know about the matter since she resigned in September 2021 due to "personal reasons". Committee chair Gordon was skeptical of the reasoning and surmised that she actually left due to shame of being associated with Pharmally in light of the ongoing investigation to which Mago confirmed.

=== Requested documents from the Darganis ===
Siblings Mohit and Twinkle Dargani participated in the investigation. Mohit is Pharmally's corporate secretary and treasurer while Twinkle is the company president. They were subject to subpoena by the committee who asked them to produce specific documents to help with the investigation but were unable to. Mohit insist that it was the company that is refusing to produce the documents and that these could be "legally accessed through different procedures under the law" and are just invoking their right as per advised of their legal counsel. Twinkle on the other hand said she would have to check with her company on which of the demanded documents can be produced citing data privacy and bank secrecy laws as well as the country's corporation code.

=== Department of Health funds ===
The transfer of ₱41.4 billion funds by the Department of Health to the Procurement Service of the Department of Budget and Management (PS-DBM) for the purpose of purchasing of pandemic response supplies was also questioned during the investigation. Part of this amount went to the 8.6 billion worth of contracts awarded to Pharmally in 2020. The committee draft would recommend filing plunder charge against DOH Secretary Francisco Duque III. Duque has maintained he and his department was not part of the Pharmally deal and insist that the DOH is focused on the medical side of the pandemic response.

== Detentions ==
Arrests orders against Pharmally officials as well as former presidential adviser Michael Yang who has been linked to the company for failing to attend investigation hearings by the Senate in September 2021. The Pharmally officials were Mohit Dargani, Twinkle Dargani, Krizle Grace Mago, Justine Garado, and Linconn Ong. These officials later attended the subsequent hearings.

Mohit and Twinkle Dargani on October 19, 2021, were cited for contempt allegedly for refusing to cooperate with the probe. They did not make any appearance at the Senate probe after the order for their arrest was released. Lao was also ordered arrested for skipping hearings despite being obliged to.

Linconn Ong, director of the company, was arrested while he was in his residence in September 2021. He was detained at the Office of the Sergeant-at-Arms (OSAA) of the Senate.

Mohit and Twinkle Dargani were arrested by the OSAA at Francisco Bangoy International Airport in Davao City while attempting to leave the country through a chartered flight. The fact that the arrest took place in President Rodrigo Duterte's hometown was pointed out by acting spokesperson Karlo Nograles as proof the Pharmally officials are not "untouchables" under Duterte's administration contrary to claims of some critics. They were also transferred to the Senate's detention facility in Metro Manila.

Twinkle Dargani reportedly suffered from a "deteriorating mental health condition". She also tested positive for COVID-19 while in detention and was temporarily confined at the Philippine General Hospital. She was released in January 2022 for humanitarian reasons after she recovered and finished her mandatory quarantine period with the understanding that she would appear in future Senate hearings if obliged. The release was approved by then Senate President Vicente Sotto III.

Mohit Dargani and Ong were transferred to the Pasay City Jail in November 2021. On March 22, 2021, the two requested the Senate to place them under house arrest but the request was not granted.

Then Senate President Sotto issued a release order for the Mohit Dargani and Ong on June 2, 2022, to avoid being charged with "illegal detention".

== Related issues ==
=== Michael Yang's alleged involvement in the illegal drug trade ===
Michael Yang, former presidential advisor had been linked to the illegal drug trade amidst the Pharmally investigation. President Duterte also defended Yang, stating that if such allegation is true, China would have advised the Philippine government not to deal with him and also brought up his links to Chinese Ambassador Zhao Jianhua. The Philippine Drug Enforcement Agency cleared Yang of involvement in such illicit activities.

PDEA director general Wilkins Villanueva, brought up a 2004 anti-drug operation against a "clandestine laboratory" in Davao City where Yang was involved but not as one of the named targets during a Cabinet meeting. The credibility of Eduardo Acierto, the dismissed officer who was responsible the 2019 alleging Yang's involvement, was also put into question when Villanueva brought up the warrant of arrest order filed against him for allegedly smuggling billions worth of pesos of methamphetamine (shabu) through hiding them in magnetic lifters.

=== Barring of Cabinet officials from the investigation ===
President Rodrigo Duterte issued a directive barring Cabinet officials from attending the Senate hearings on the Pharmally issue in October 2021. He cited "blatant disrespect of resource persons" and chided Gordon saying the Senator can't "play God". He insist the Senate should file a case if they believe Pharmally could have committed a crime and remarked that "the Senate is not a criminal court" and that the senators should stop its "witch hunt". He also accused Blue Ribbon Committee Chair Dick Gordon and other senators for using the probe to gain publicity. He also threatened to find "what's wrong" with the senators involved.

In February 2022, Duterte refused to comment when the draft report raised the possibility of charging cases against him for betrayal of public trust. He said that there shall be a time to answer to the report but he would rather ignore it at that time.

=== Treatment of detainees ===
The Dargani and Ong families urged the Commission on Human Rights to look into their kins' detention. The three were alleged to have been deprived of basic human rights. Twinkle Dargani in particular was reportedly denied attention for her mental health condition. They also alleged Senate Blue Ribbon chair Dick Gordon for using "the false pretense of extending the inquiry" to use the three's prolonged detention as a tool for his re-election campaign for the 2022 Senate election.

== Aftermath ==
The investigation ended with the adjournment of the 18th Congress. 18 hearings were held by the committee.

Partial draft report signatories
Signatories (9)	Non-signatories (11)
Dick Gordon (committee head); Leila de Lima; Franklin Drilon; Risa Hontiveros; Ping Lacson; Manny Pacquiao; Francis Pangilinan; Koko Pimentel; Ralph Recto	Sonny Angara; Pia Cayetano; Sherwin Gatchalian; Bong Go; Lito Lapid; Imee Marcos; Grace Poe; Bong Revilla; Francis Tolentino; Cynthia Villar; Migz Zubiri

The Senate Blue Ribbon Committee was able to come up with a 113-page partial draft report by the time the 18th Congress is about to be adjourned. The draft was signed by nine senators, two people short for it to be able to be brought up to the Senate plenary. The draft also include proposal to file charges against President Rodrigo Duterte when he steps down from office for having "betrayed public trust" when he appointed Michael Yang, one of the link parties to the Pharmally investigation, as presidential advisor.

Senator Miguel Zubiri refused to sign it since the draft stating that he would have signed it if "Duterte's name was not in it for plunder" believing that evidences against the then president were all circumstantial. Gatchalian also did not sign the draft. Those who signed the draft were Dick Gordon, Ping Lacson, Manny Pacquiao, Koko Pimentel, Risa Hontiveros, Francis Pangilinan, Leila de Lima, Franklin Drilon, and Ralph Recto.

Blue Ribbon Committee Chair Gordon lamented that the senators could have still signed the draft even with reservations pointing out two signatories; Recto asked for the draft to be amended and Hontiveros who pushed for interpellation. De Lima expressed disappointment to the non-elevation of the draft to the plenary.

Senator Drilon concluded that the investigation was not a waste of time stating that the 19th Congress could reopen the investigation and refer to the findings of the previous' Congress Senate Blue Ribbon Committee as well as adopt or discard the committee draft.

== Charges ==
In an August 14, 2023 decision, the Office of the Ombudsman recommended the filing of three graft charges against former PS-DBM Undersecretary Lloyd Christopher Lao, former PS-DBM procurement group director and current overall deputy ombudsman Warren Rex Liong, PS-DBM procurement management officer Paul Jasper de Guzman, and Pharmally executives Mohit Dargani, Twinkle Dargani, Linconn Ong, Huang Tzu Yen, and Justine Garado. The Ombudsman also recommended the filing of one count of graft against former PS-DBM executives Christine Marie Suntay, Webster Laureñana, August Ylagan, and Jasonmer Uayan, and Pharmally's Krizle Grace Mago. Administrative and criminal charges against RITM staff (Amado A. Tandoc, Lei Lanna M. Dancel, Dave A. Tangcalagan, Jhobert T. Bernal, Kenneth Aristotle P. Punzalan, Rose M. Marasigan) were dismissed for insufficiency of evidence and due to lack of probable cause.

In a separate resolution, the Office of the Ombudsman also found Lao, Liong, De Guzman, Laureñana, Ylagan, Uayan, and Suntay guilty of gross neglect of duty for their involvement in the irregular procurement of COVID-19 test kits from Pharmally.

Ombudsman Samuel Martires in a Resolution dated May 3 included Lin Weixiong (Rose Nono Lin’s husband) as respondent alongside Twinkle Dargani, Mohit Dargani, Linconn Ong, Justine Garado, and Huang Tzu Yen. It denied the supplemental motion for reconsideration of Lloyd Christopher Lao, thereby dismissing the appeal.

On May 10, 2024, the Ombudsman ordered the filing of Information against Francisco Duque III and Department of Budget and Management Procurement Service (PS) head, Lloyd Christopher Lao for violation of section 3(e), Republic Act 3019, the "Anti-Graft and Corrupt Practices Act" on their participation in the Pharmally scandal. It ruled on their irregular transfer of P41 billion of the Department of Health to PS-DBM for the procurement of COVID-19 supplies. The 49-page judgment also ordered them "dismissed them from service, with forfeiture of all their retirement benefits and perpetual disqualification from reentering government."

In a September 12, 2024 resolution, the Sandiganbayan issued an arrest warrant with a recommended bail of P90,000 against Christopher Lao for alleged violation of Section 3, Republic Act 3019. He was detained by police in Davao City on September 18 but was released on bail. Duque also avoided arrest by posting bail.
