= Fertilizer Fund scam =

Political scandal in the Philippines

The Fertilizer Fund scam is a Philippine political controversy involving accusations that Agriculture Undersecretary Jocelyn Bolante diverted ₱728 million in fertilizer funds to the 2004 election campaign of President Gloria Macapagal Arroyo.

== Background ==
When Operation Big Bird concluded in late 1986, the Philippine government was able to identify and recover US$356 million from the Swiss Bank deposits of Ferdinand Marcos and wife Imelda Marcos. While the money sat in a Philippine government account in Switzerland, successive administration debated what to do with the funds. By 1998 the funds had grown to $570 million with interest, and were transferred to an escrow account in Philippine National Bank. In July 2003, the Supreme Court of the Philippines ruled with finality that the funds were ill-gotten and thus are considered public funds. Pres. Arroyo announced that the money in accordance with the law on recovered ill-gotten wealth from the Marcos family will be used for the Agriculture Sector and Agrarian Reform.

== Details ==
In March 2004, the Philippine Daily Inquirer reported that Senator Panfilo Lacson accused President Arroyo of vote-buying by authorizing the release of ₱728 million. The money was supposedly to be used for the purchase of fertilizers which would be distributed to the local officials.

After a year, an episode of The Probe Team reported that some farmers claimed that they did not receive fertilizers from the funds released by the Department of Agriculture. A Philippine Center for Investigative Journalism (PCIJ) special report was released later saying that billions of farm funds were used to fund Arroyo's presidential campaign.

=== Jocelyn Bolante ===
Jocelyn Bolante was undersecretary of the Department of Agriculture when the fertilizer fund scam erupted in March 2004. He is accused of diverting at least ₱728 million in fertilizer funds to President Arroyo's 2004 election campaign. Bolante resigned from his post in September 2004.

When the controversy broke out in 2006, Bolante fled to the U.S. and sought asylum, but his petition was denied by the U.S. courts and he was eventually deported. He arrived in the Philippines on October 28, 2008. Upon his arrival, the Senate effected the warrant on Bolante, initially holding him under hospital arrest. After a month, he appeared in the Senate for the first time. He denies that the money was misused, stating that there was no fertilizer scam despite the findings of the Commission on Audit that there was 'excessive overpricing' of the liquid fertilizer purchased by Bolante's proponents. He cleared President Arroyo of any direct involvement, including the congressmen and other local officials implicated in the fertilizer fund scam. He testified that it was former Secretary of Agriculture Luis Lorenzo who requested the release of the fertilizer fund.

== Investigation ==
The Philippine Senate Committee on Agriculture in March 2006 recommended the filing of plunder charges against Bolante and Lorenzo, along with other officials of the Department of Agriculture. A copy of the inquiry was also sent to the Anti-Money Laundering Council (AMLC). The chair of the committee, Senator Ramon Magsaysay Jr., said that Arroyo should be held accountable for mismanagement of the ₱728-million fertilizer fund.

The AMLC began its own investigation in September 2006 after the Philippine National Bank revealed it had received "2 suspicious transaction reports." The investigation showed that a Bolante-chaired firm, Livelihood Corp., transferred ₱172.6 million to Molugan Foundation Inc. and ₱40 million to Assembly of Gracious Samaritans Foundation, Inc. (AGS). Molugan Foundation also transferred PHP38 million to AGS.

Task Force Abono in 2008 looked into the involvement of some 140 congressmen in the Ginintuang Masaganang Ani (GMA) program of the Department of Agriculture.

On May 2, 2014, the Office of the Ombudsman dismissed the case against Arroyo, who was at the time under hospital arrest for alleged misuse of Philippine Charity Sweepstakes Office funds.

The Sandiganbayan (Philippine anti-graft court) launched its investigation into the fertilizer fund scam in 2016.

== Litigation ==
Janet Lim-Napoles and six others were indicted in 2018 for their involvement in the Fertilizer Fund scam. The group was indicted for graft and malversation of public funds over ₱5 million worth of projects, including the anomalous purchase of fertilizers in 2004 in Surigao del Norte. Jo Chris Trading, a firm owned by Napoles, was tagged as the distributor of allegedly overpriced and diluted liquid fertilizers. Fertilizer funds totaling ₱728 million were allegedly diverted in a vote-buying scheme involving favored local officials.

In January 2021, the Sandiganbayan convicted for graft and corruption former Misamis Oriental mayor Alberto Acain and four other municipal officials. Acain was sentenced to 16 years in prison for violating the Anti-Graft and Corrupt Practices Act over the purchase of 3,666 liters of fertilizer worth ₱4.99 million.

In March 2023, the Sandiganbayan convicted two former Department of Agriculture Region 1 officials of 6 counts of graft and sentenced to serve 36 to 60 years in jail for the purchase of ₱3.4 million of liquid fertilizer bottles without public bidding, and for failing to distribute the fertilizers to farmer beneficiaries.

The Sandiganbayan's fourth division, in a resolution promulgated on October 27, 2023, but made public the following month, granted the motions filed by Napoles, by a president of non-government organization Philippine Social Development Foundation Inc., as well as by four former officials of the Department of Agriculture–Caraga, to dismiss the charges against them, citing inordinate delay in the investigation by the Ombudsman, which took more than six years since the complaint was filed in 2017.

In April 2024, the Sandiganbayan affirmed its December 7, 2023, conviction of former Lazi, Siquijor, mayor Orville Fua and four others for graft over the release of ₱4.99 million in the Fertilizer Fund scam.

In July 2024, the Sandiganbayan convicted former Cagayan de Oro City representative Constantino Jaraula and four others of graft over the transfer of ₱3 million in public funds connected to the Fertilizer Fund scam. Jaraula was sentenced by the court to serve up to 10 years in prison.

In November 2025, the Sandiganbayan convicted two former Department of Agriculture regional officials for graft for the 2004 purchase of overpriced liquid fertilizers for Camiguin worth ₱3.9 million.

== See also ==
- Corruption in the Philippines
- Impeachment of Merceditas Gutierrez
- Marlene Garcia-Esperat, a journalist who was killed in March 2005 for her investigation into the scam
- Pork barrel scam
- Malampaya fund scam
