= Tony Yang (businessman) =

Chinese businessman (born 1970)

- 杨建新
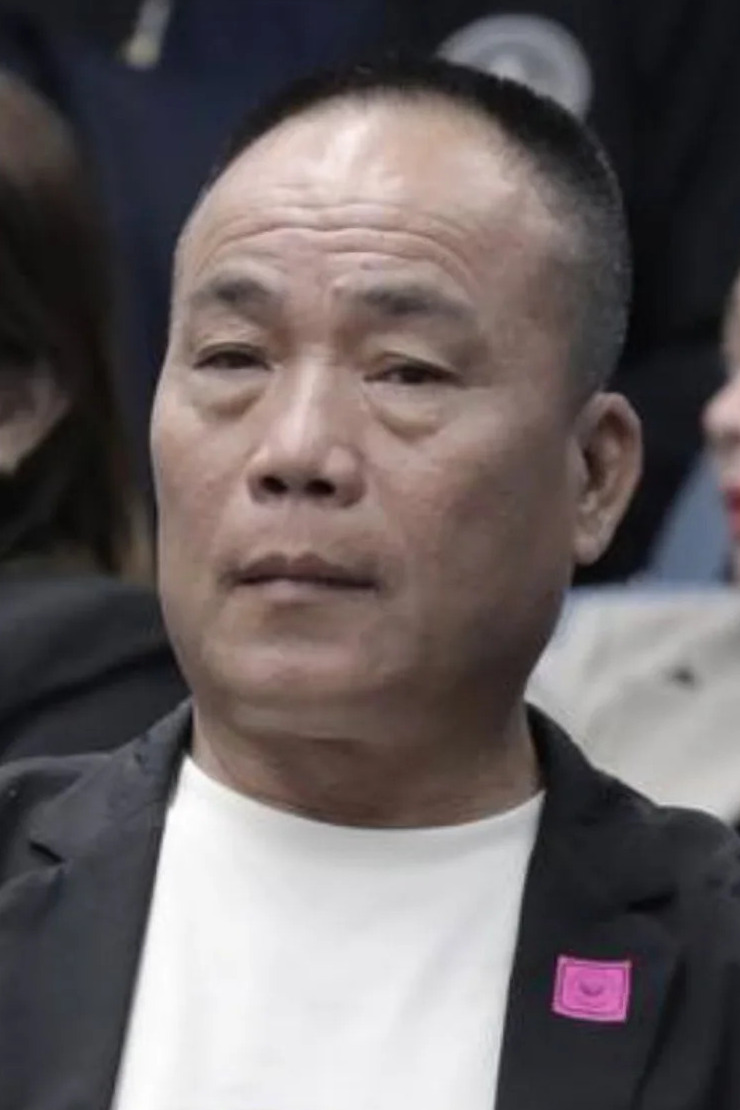
- Yang in 2024
- Born: Yang Jianxin; September 4, 1970 (age 55); Jinjiang, Fujian, China
- Other name: Antonio Maestrado Lim
- Citizenship: Chinese
- Occupation: Businessman
- Relatives: Michael (younger brother)

Yang Jianxin (Chinese: 杨建新), more commonly known as Tony Yang or Antonio Maestrado Lim in the Philippines, is a Chinese businessman based in Cagayan de Oro.

== Early life ==
A Chinese citizen, Tony Yang was born as Yang Jianxin in Jinjiang, Quanzhou in Fujian province. His false Filipino birth certificate lists his birthdate as September 4, 1970.

== Career ==
Yang under the encouragement of his grandfather would move to the Philippines around 1998 or 1999 to start his business venture in the country. He would use Philippine identity documents including a birth certificate which he was able to obtain in 2004 which Yang said was fraudulently procured by his grandfather. He says he solely use "Antonio Lim" for Philippine legal documents and transactions.

Yang would establish prominent business ties in the city of Cagayan de Oro in Mindanao where he often referred to by the Antonio Lim name in the local industry.

He founded Yangtze Trade Company Inc. in 2000 which would branch out to various companies namely; Yangtze River Economy United Development, Yangtze Pharmaceutical Group, Yangtze River International Group, HK Yangtze Group International Yangtze River Pharmaceutical Group, and Yangtze Rice Mill.

He was the president of the Philippine Sanjia Steel Corporation. His company operates Philippine Veterans Investment Development Corporation's (Phividec) steel mill in Tagoloan, Misamis Oriental.

Yang was also linked to a former Philippine Offshore Gaming Operator (POGO) hub at the Alwana Business Park as the alleged owner of Oroone Inc. a registered service provider for POGOs. Yang said he is a mere "dummy" for another person. The city council released a resolution in 2017 permitting the operation of the Oroone hub. Operations of that POGO hub ended in July 2023.

== Arrest ==
In September 2024, Yang was arrested in Metro Manila upon arriving at the airport for misrepresenting himself as a Filipino citizen. He would appear at the inquiry by the Quad Commission of the House of Representatives and the Senate where the nature of his identity and business were scrutinized.

== Personal life ==
Tony Yang has an younger brother named Yang Hongming, who also goes by the name Michael who was at one point the presidential advisor for Philippine president Rodrigo Duterte. However the elder Yang says he has strained relationship with his brother even back to when he moved to the Philippines and has no joint ventures with him.

He claims not to be fluent in English or any Philippine languages, a claim disputed by lawmakers who grilled him in the 2024 inquiries Presidential Anti-Organized Crime Commission spokesperson Winston Casio further disputes this stating Yang can speak "good Tagalog and a little bit of Visaya".

He is unrelated to the Lims of Cagayan de Oro, a prominent Chinese Filipino business family.
