= Marcos Japanese ODA scandal =

Political scandal

The Marcos Japanese ODA Scandal, referred to in Japan simply as the Marukosu giwaku (マルコス疑惑), or "Marcos scandal", refers to incidents of alleged corruption linked to Japanese Official Development Assistance (ODA) to the Philippines during Philippine president Ferdinand Marcos' administration.

The scandal so preoccupied the Japanese legislature in 1986 that the legislative session of that year earned the nickname of the "Marcos Diet." The lessons from the Marcos corruption scandals were among the reasons why Japan created its 1992 ODA Charter.

== Revelations ==
When the Marcoses were exiled to Hawaii in the United States in February 1986 after the People Power Revolution, the American authorities confiscated papers that the Marcoses brought with them. The confiscated documents revealed that since the 1970s, Marcos and his associates embezzled 10 to 15 percent of Overseas Economic Cooperation Fund loans through commissions from about fifty Japanese contractors.

== Background ==
When Ferdinand Marcos first became president in 1965, he appointed his Upsilon Sigma Phi fraternity brother and golfing buddy Roberto Benedicto as the Philippines' ambassador to Japan. Benedicto's appointment as Japanese ambassador allowed him to develop high-level contacts in Japan, and allowed him to acquire over $550 million in World War II reparations, which he allegedly used to forward his own private interests.

Benedicto's ambassadorship also gave him insider knowledge regarding the business interests of the Japanese, which allowed him to arrange lucrative joint-venture operations between Japanese corporations and his own.

In 1972, Ferdinand Marcos abolished the Philippine legislature under martial law, and took on its legislative powers as part of his authoritarian rule. Benedicto and Marcos then ratified the Treaty of Amity, Commerce and Navigation ten days prior to a visit of Japanese Prime Minister Kakuei Tanaka, giving Japan a “most-favored nation” status. Prior to this, the Philippine legislature had refused to ratify the measure for 13 years after it was first proposed. By 1975 three years later, Japan had displaced the United States as the main source of investment in the country.

== Aftermath ==
The Marcos ODA scandal and other incidents of corruption were issues that the succeeding administrations of presidents Corazon Aquino and Fidel V. Ramos had to address. The Japanese government discreetly requested the Philippine government to downplay the issue as it would affect the business sector and bilateral relations.

The lessons from the Marcos scandals were among the reasons why Japan created its 1992 ODA Charter.

== See also ==
- Japan–Philippines relations
- Stolen wealth of the Marcos family
