= Proclamation No. 216 =

2017 Philippine proclamation of martial law on Mindanao (ended 2019)

- Long title: Declaring a State of Martial Law and Suspending the Privilege of the Writ of Habeas Corpus in the Whole of Mindanao
- Citation: Proclamation No. 216, s. 2017
- Territorial extent: Whole of Mindanao
- Signed by: Rodrigo Duterte
- Signed: May 23, 2017

Keywords
- martial law, rebellion, terrorism
- Status: Expired

Proclamation No. 216 was the 2017 proclamation of martial law and suspension of the privilege of the writ of habeas corpus in the whole of Mindanao amid clashes between government forces and Maute group terrorists in Marawi, issued by Philippine President Rodrigo Duterte on May 23, 2017. The state of martial law was extended thrice by Congress at the request of Duterte, citing necessity to quell hostile activities perpetrated by terrorist groups, and ended with the third extension lapsing on December 31, 2019.

== History ==
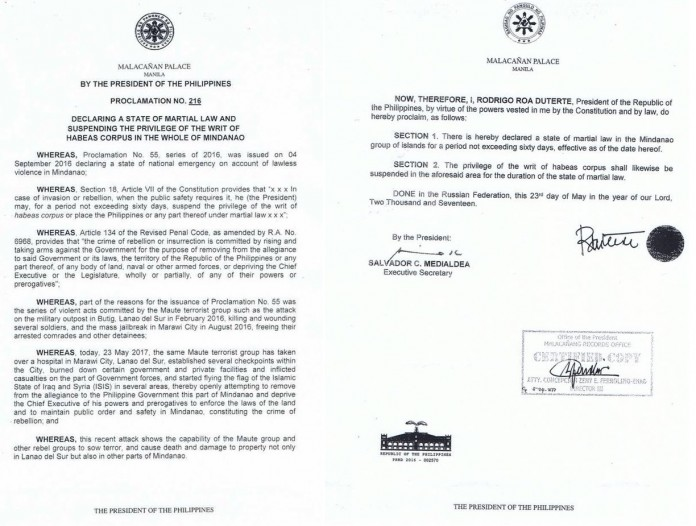
Proclamation No. 216

=== Declaration ===
At 10:00 p.m. PST (UTC+08:00) on May 23, 2017, amid a Maute group-related escalation of conflicts in Mindanao as well as recent clashes in Marawi between the Armed Forces of the Philippines and the Islamist group, Philippine President Rodrigo Duterte placed the whole of the Mindanao island group under martial law. The proclamation was announced during a press briefing held in Moscow, where Duterte was on an official visit; the state of martial law will be in effect for 60 days. Presidential Spokesperson Ernesto Abella said the declaration was possible given the "existence of rebellion," while Foreign Secretary Alan Peter Cayetano explained that the step was taken with "the safety, the lives and property of people of Mindanao" in mind. Implementation is to be pursuant to the 1987 Constitution, which provides for a maximum 60-day-state of martial law without Congress approval for extension, the continuation of government functions, and the safeguard of individual freedoms. However, Duterte insisted that it will not be any different from martial law under President Ferdinand Marcos.

While the declaration did not affect citizens and government units in Luzon or the Visayas, Duterte suggested that he might extend the suspension of the privilege of the writ of habeas corpus to Visayas and martial law to the entire country if needed to "protect the people."

Congress approved of a resolution supporting the measure on May 31, 2017.

=== First extension ===
On July 23, 2017, lawmakers voted 261–18 (with no abstention among those present) in favor of the President Rodrigo Duterte's request to give extension to Proclamation Order No. 216 during a special joint session of the House of Representatives and the Senate. This extension was valid until December 31, 2017.

The majority number required for the approval of martial law is at 158 of the 314 members of Congress.

Under the Constitution, the President can declare martial law for an initial period of 60 days and ask for its extension in case of rebellion, invasion or when public safety requires it.

The incumbent Senators who voted for NO are as follows:

1. Bam Aquino
2. Franklin Drilon
3. Risa Hontiveros
4. Francis Pangilinan

The incumbent Representatives who voted for NO are as follows:

1. Gary Alejano (Magdalo)
2. Lito Atienza (Buhay)
3. Teddy Baguilat (Ifugao Lone District)
4. Jose Christopher Belmonte (Quezon City 6th District)
5. Gabriel Bordado (Camarines Sur 3rd District)
6. Arlene Brosas (Gabriela Women's Party)
7. Ariel Casilao (Anakpawis)
8. France Castro (ACT Teachers)
9. Emmi de Jesus (Gabriela Women's Party)
10. Sarah Elago (Kabataan)
11. Edcel Lagman (Albay 1st District)
12. Antonio Tinio (ACT Teachers)
13. Tom Villarin (Akbayan)
14. Carlos Isagani Zarate (Bayan Muna)

The incumbent Senators who were ABSENT are as follows:

1. Nancy Binay
2. Leila de Lima (detained)
3. Antonio Trillanes

=== Second extension ===
Lagman et al. vs. Senate President Pimentel et al
- Court: Supreme Court of the Philippines
- Full case name: List (4): Rep. Edcel C. Lagman et al v. Senate President Aquilino Pimentel III et al.; Eufemia Campos Cullamat et al. v. President Rodrigo Duterte et al.; Loretta Ann Pargas-Rosales, et al. v. Executive Secretary Salvador C. Medialdea, et al.; Christian S. Monsod, et al. v. Senate President Aquilino Pimentel III et al.]
- Decided: February 6, 2018
- Citations: G.R. No. 235935; G.R. No. 236061; G.R. No. 236145; G.R. No. 236155

Questions presented
- Constitutionality of the extension of the proclamation of martial law and suspension of the privilege of the writ of habeas corpus in the entire Mindanao for one year

Court membership
- Judges sitting: Maria Lourdes Sereno, Antonio Carpio, Presbitero Velasco, Teresita De Castro, Diosdado Peralta, Lucas Bersamin, Mariano del Castillo, Estela Perlas-Bernabe, Marvic Leonen, Francis Jardeleza, Alfredo Benjamin Caguioa, Samuel Martires, Noel Tijam, Andres Reyes Jr. and Alexander Gesmundo

Case opinions
- Decision by: Justice Noel Tijam
- Concurrence: Justices Tijam, Velasco, Jr., De Castro, Peralta, Bersamin, Del Castillo, Perlas-Bernabe, Martires, Reyes Jr. and Gesmundo
- Dissent: Chief Justice Sereno and Justices Carpio, Leonen, Jardeleza and Caguioa

On December 13, 2017, a special joint session of the House of Representatives and the Senate was held in order to respond to President Rodrigo Duterte's request to extend the declaration of martial law in Mindanao until December 31, 2018. In his letter addressed to the Congress, President Duterte cited the remaining threats of ISIS-inspired terrorist groups. Congress voted 240–27 (14–4 from the Senate, 226–23 from the House) in favor of the second extension.

Four petitions were filed before the Philippine Supreme Court questioning the year-long extension of martial law in Mindanao. Among the petitioners were one of the framers of the 1987 Philippine Constitution Christian Monsod, a former Commission on Elections chairperson, and opposition lawmakers. Petitioners contended that the extension lacked factual basis, citing government reports that Marawi City had been liberated.

On December 5, 2017, the Supreme Court voted 10-3-1 upholding the implementation of martial law in Mindanao, with Supreme Court Justice Noel Tijam saying that the extension was necessary because of persisting rebellion. Dissenting opinion by Supreme Court Associate Justice Marvic Leonen stated that the re-extension of martial law "enables the rise of an emboldened authoritarian."

Supreme Court decision on the validity of the extension of Martial Law in Mindanao
In Favor (10)	Opposed (5)
Noel G. Tijam; Presbitero J. Velasco, Jr.; Teresita De Castro; Diosdado M. Peralta; Lucas P. Bersamin; Mariano del Castillo; Estela Perlas-Bernabe; Samuel R. Martires; Andres Reyes Jr.; Alexander Gesmundo	Maria Lourdes Sereno; Antonio Carpio; Francis Jardeleza; Marvic Leonen; Alfredo Benjamin Caguioa

=== Third extension ===
During a joint session of the Senate and the House of Representatives on December 12, 2018, Congress voted to grant a third extension of martial law in Mindanao until end of 2019 upon the request of President Rodrigo Duterte. In the Senate, 12 voted yes in favor of the extension and 5 voted no, with one abstention. In the House of Representatives, 223 voted yes while 23 voted no.

Groups that included Congress representatives Edcel Lagman and Carlos Zarate, constitutionalist Christian Monsod, and Lumad students and teachers represented by human rights lawyer Chel Diokno filed a total of four petitions before the Supreme Court questioning the validity of the extension.

On February 19, 2019, the Supreme Court voted 9–4 to dismiss the petitions and uphold the constitutionality of the third extension of martial law in Mindanao.

The state of martial law ended with the third extension lapsing by the end of 2019, 953 days after it was first declared. It was described as the "Philippines' longest period of military rule since the draconian regime of late dictator Ferdinand Marcos."

== Reactions ==
President Duterte's declaration of martial law in the entire Mindanao region was met with polarized views from the citizens with some reports indicating mixed reactions. A Social Weather Station survey conducted in September 2017 indicated that majority (54%) of Filipinos were in favor of extending martial law beyond 2017.

=== Public figures ===
Senator Manny Pacquiao said "I fully support the declaration of martial law in Mindanao by President Rodrigo Duterte. I believe this is timely and necessary in the light of political turmoil perpetrated by the Moro extremists in Marawi City." Senators Antonio Trillanes IV and Bam Aquino, on the other hand, questioned President Duterte's declaration of martial law in Mindanao. According to former President Fidel Ramos, "the martial law that is bound to happen could be more harmful" (compared to Ferdinand Marcos's time).

On May 30, 2017, the majority bloc of the Senate adopted a resolution expressing support for President Duterte's declaration of martial law in Mindanao, saying that the proclamation is required for public safety while at the same time clarifying the operation of the 1987 Constitution. The resolution passed the Senate in a 17–5 vote. The opponents of the resolution, all minority bloc senators, filed another resolution calling for a joint session of Congress to decide on the proclamation. Their resolution failed the Senate in a 12–9 vote.

=== Catholic Church ===
Catholic bishops in Mindanao believe that President Duterte's declaration of martial law in the region should only be temporary. Cardinal Orlando Quevedo, the Archbishop of Cotabato, said that the Church is aware of the declaration's necessity to solve issues of peace and order and that the Church does not have "solid and sufficient" facts to protest the declaration as "morally reprehensible". He urged the Mindanaoan people to remain calm but vigilant as to ensure that the implementation of martial law would not be abused. Quevado added that the Church is prepared to fully condemn the declaration of martial law "if it goes in the way of evil." Ozamis Archbishop Martin Jumoad supports the declaration of martial law, but believes that there should be a "mechanism" to ensure that the implementation would not violate human rights.

=== Muslim groups ===
Muslim groups have expressed support for the imposition of martial law, with some, such as the chairman of the Metro Manila Muslim Community for Justice and Peace, calling for its extension. A group of lawyers from the Philippine Muslim Society planned to oppose before the Supreme Court the president's declaration of martial law in Mindanao.

=== Business sector ===
Philippine financial markets weakened in early trading on March 24, 2017, as the Philippine Stock Exchange Composite Index (PSEi) was down 0.42 percent to 7,779.73, before rallying to close at 7,837.82, up by 0.33 percent or 25.68 points, which a trader attributed to investors remaining positive on the domestic market despite the developments in Mindanao.

Investors were closely monitoring closely how Duterte will use martial law to fight the long-running extremist problem in the south, analysts said. BPI Securities research head Haj Narvaez told Cathy Yang on ANC's Market Edge that the incident caused uncertainties that had investors making more conservative decisions. Narvaez projected "some downward pressure" in the next 1 to 2 weeks and said that investors will assess if the situation in Mindanao can be controlled. Tycoon and philanthropist Washington SyCip said the President cutting short a foreign visit due to security worries was "not the publicity that we need. I think worldwide, the word martial law is not the best thing."

Amid fighting in Marawi and fears of martial law, numerous overseas tourists cancelled hotel and resort bookings in the Visayas region.

== Actions by the government ==
=== Armed Forces of the Philippines directive ===
The Department of National Defense issued a guidance to the Armed Forces of the Philippines and its attached bureaus regarding the proper implementation of martial law in Mindanao. The memorandum states:

Please be guided that the declaration of Martial Law in the island of Mindanao does not suspend the operation of the Constitution, nor supplement the functioning of the Philippine judicial and legislative assemblies, nor authorize the conferment of jurisdiction on military courts and agencies over civilian where civil courts are able to function, nor automatically suspend the privilege of the writ of habeas corpus.

In this connection, the AFP and all bureaus and agencies of this Department are hereby enjoined that the rule of law and human rights should prevail in the place or part of the Philippines where the Martial Law was declared and effective.

Any arrest, search and seizure executed or implemented in the area or place where Martial Law is effective, including the filing of charges, should comply with the Revised Rules of Court and applicable jurisprudence.

DND bureaus and agencies involved in humanitarian activities are hereby enjoined to institute appropriate action on those affected and displaced persons by providing adequate assistance in coordination with other government agencies.

=== Government roundups in Davao City ===
On May 25, 2017, after authorities received information on the presence of unidentified and suspicious-looking persons, around 250 individuals have been rounded up in the barangays of Bucana and Mini-Forest in Davao City as "persons of interest" for not being able to present proof of identification. According to Davao City Police Office Senior Supt. Alexander Tagum, they were at DPCO headquarters to undergo "a verification process" and were not under arrest. He said their operation is part of their efforts to prevent the entry of terrorists in one of Mindanao's biggest cities.

=== Censorship and suppression in Mindanao ===
On Friday, May 26, 2017, the Armed Forces of the Philippines stated that it would censor the press and social media to ensure security across Mindanao, and warned that violators would be arrested. According to military spokesman Brigadier General Restituto Padilla, "We'll exercise the right to censure, (sic)" and that it would be based on 3 conditions: to ensure the safety of lives, to ensure operational security and to ensure the safety of men in uniform who are fighting, and for other national security considerations.

"Kaya ngayon umaapela kami maaga pa lang na i-exercise 'nyo ang common sense, na 'pag alam ninyo na ito'y nakakasama at hindi nakakatulong, 'wag 'nyo na 'ho i-post. Baka minsan na lang, kakatukin na lang kayo ng pulis at aarestuhin kayo," (This early, we're appealing to the public to exercise their common sense. If you know that what you're posting does harm and does not help, don't post it. You might just find the police knocking on your door to arrest you.) according to Padilla.

Likewise, the Philippine National Police in Davao region (Police Regional Office 11, or PRO-11) stated that the right to form a public assembly such as protests or rallies against the government would be curtailed with the declaration of Martial Law in Mindanao. PRO-11 said that leaders and organizers of groups that will stage protests or rallies would be arrested if caught making a public nuisance.

=== Further statements from Duterte ===
On the same Friday, Duterte took responsibility for the actions of soldiers in Mindanao, stating "If you go down, I go down. But for this martial law and the consequences of martial law and the ramifications of martial law, I and I alone would be responsible. Trabaho lang kayo. Ako na ang bahala. Ako na ang magpakulong sa inyo (Just do your job. I will take care of things. I'll be the one to be imprisoned for you)".

He then joked that soldiers would be free to rape and that he would be the one to go to jail for it. "Pag naka-rape ka ng tatlo, aminin ko na akin iyon," (If you were to rape three, I'll admit that it was mine) according to Duterte.

Amidst outrage from citizens, women's groups, human rights groups, and personalities like Chelsea Clinton and Senator Risa Hontiveros, Malacañang Presidential Spokesman Ernesto Abella defended Duterte's rape joke as "heightened bravado". Senator Manny Pacquiao, likewise defended Duterte by stating "Just because he is the President, he can't crack jokes anymore?" In turn, Duterte defended himself, saying he was speaking sarcastically about rape and it was not a joke. He then took aim at Chelsea Clinton and questioned whether she was just as outraged by her father, Bill Clinton's affair with Monica Lewinsky.

On Saturday, May 27, 2017, Duterte vowed that he would ignore Congress and the Supreme Court on the duration limits of martial law. He said: "Hanggang hindi sinabi ng pulis pati Armed Forces na safe na ang Philippines, this martial law will continue. Hindi ako makinig sa iba. 'Yang Supreme Court, 'yang mga congressmen, wala naman sila dito. Bakit, sila ba ang nagpapakamatay? Sila ba ang naghirap dito? Sila ba 'yung – have they suffered the wounds of war? Sila ba 'yung nagtitiis?" (Until the police and the Armed Forces say the Philippines is already safe, this martial law will continue. I won't listen to others. The Supreme Court, the congressmen, they're not here. Why, are they the ones risking their lives? Are they the ones suffering here? Are they – have they suffered the wounds of war? Are they the ones enduring this battle?)

=== Martial law cartoon ===
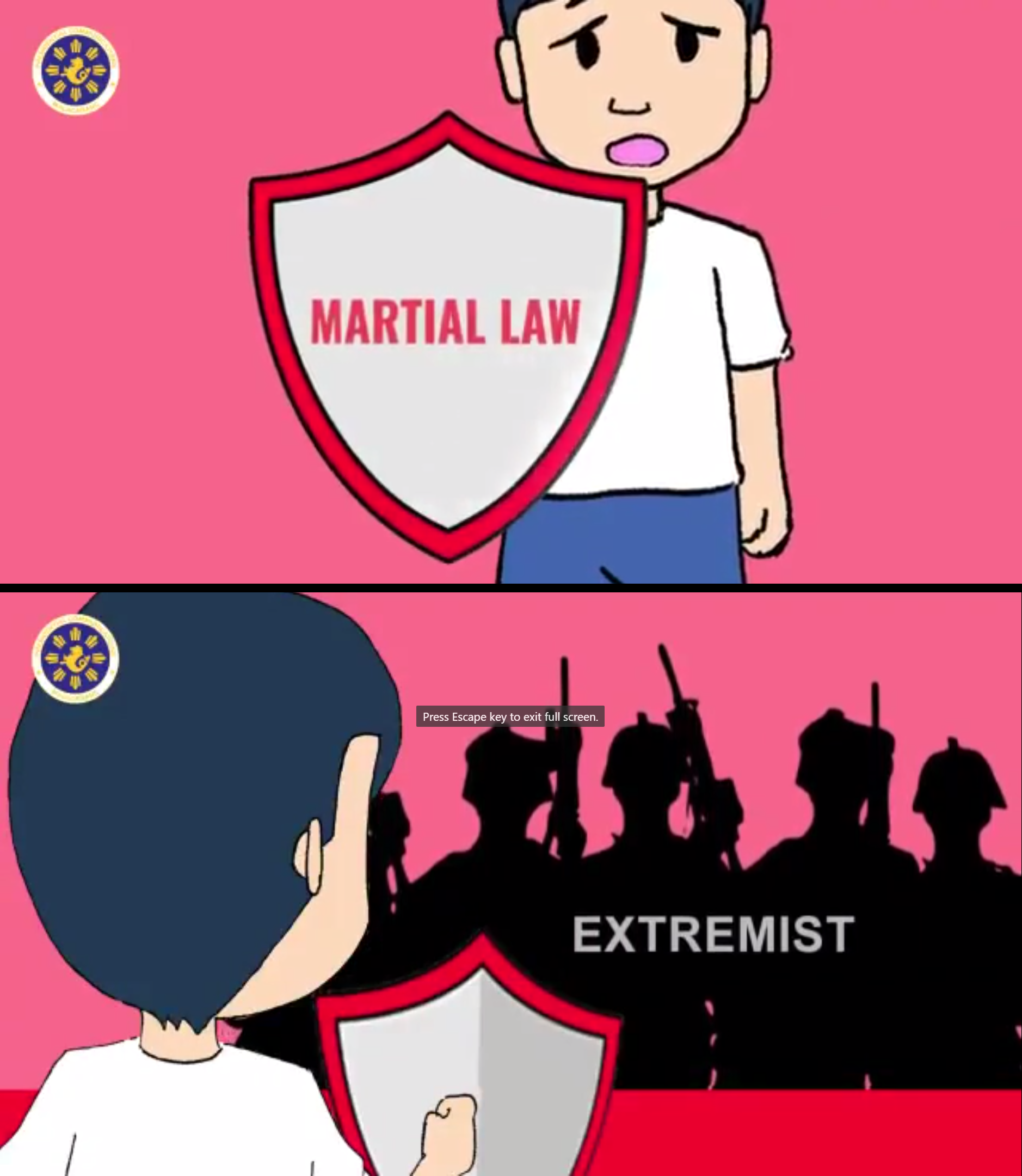
A screenshot of the martial law cartoon video.

On May 31, 2017, the Presidential Communications Operations Office (PCOO) released a cartoon video with the hashtag #DefendRepublic promoting Martial Law on the Internet via its official Twitter and Facebook accounts. In it, a fearful boy is seen holding a shield with the words "Martial Law" inscribed on it, as silhouettes of professional-looking soldiers labeled "Extremist" march upon him, while a voiceover narrates:

In the free society, there are groups who don't want to give independence. They are adamant on detaining peaceful spirits. They are distressing feelings with fears. Let us not allow them to terrify us. We will all fight in unity. Martial law should be the rule of the land. Martial law, Now.

The video was derided by netizens and senators due to its content, grammar and poor graphics and message that Martial Law should be treated as "the new normal", as well as for being a waste of taxpayer money. The video was deleted by the PCOO shortly thereafter and disowned by the palace.

== Relation to the communist rebellion ==
On May 25, 2017, the Communist Party of the Philippines called on its armed wing, the New People's Army, to "plan and carry out more tactical offensives across Mindanao and the entire archipelago" in response to the Philippine government's declaration of martial law. The party said that the "martial law imposition was made on narrow pretext of armed clashes in Marawi City between the AFP and Maute group," which the party referred to as a bandit group whose leaders, the party claim, "have known links with military officials." The CPP also called on Filipinos to fight the imposition of martial law in Mindanao and demand its immediate lifting.

Defense Secretary Delfin Lorenzana warned the New People's Army not to get involved with the Marawi crisis as he reiterated that the implementation of martial law in Mindanao will not target local communists. Lorenzana said that martial law was declared to address radical Islamic terrorism and narco-terrorism in Mindanao according to the directives of the President and that they will fully comply with them. He urged the communists not to force the government's hand and to immediately stop all illegal activities and abide by the true spirit of the peace process.

Peace talks between the Government of the Philippines and the National Democratic Front in the Netherlands were suspended following these developments. It was the second time that it was put on hold since the Duterte administration started negotiations with the communist rebels in 2016, with Presidential Peace Adviser Jesus Dureza saying the administration "will not proceed to participate in the scheduled fifth round of peace negotiations until such time as there are clear indications that an enabling environment conducive to achieving just and sustainable peace in the land shall prevail." Dureza cited the continuing attacks by the NPA and the communist leadership's order for its armed wing to "accelerate and intensify attacks against the government in the face of martial law in Mindanao."

== Allegations of looting ==
Reports also surfaced during and after the Battle of Marawi, stating that six soldiers looted jewelry and cash from houses in the city.

== See also ==
- Martial law in the Philippines
- Proclamation No. 55
- Proclamation No. 1081
