= Burial of Ferdinand Marcos =

Interring of the former Philippine president's remains

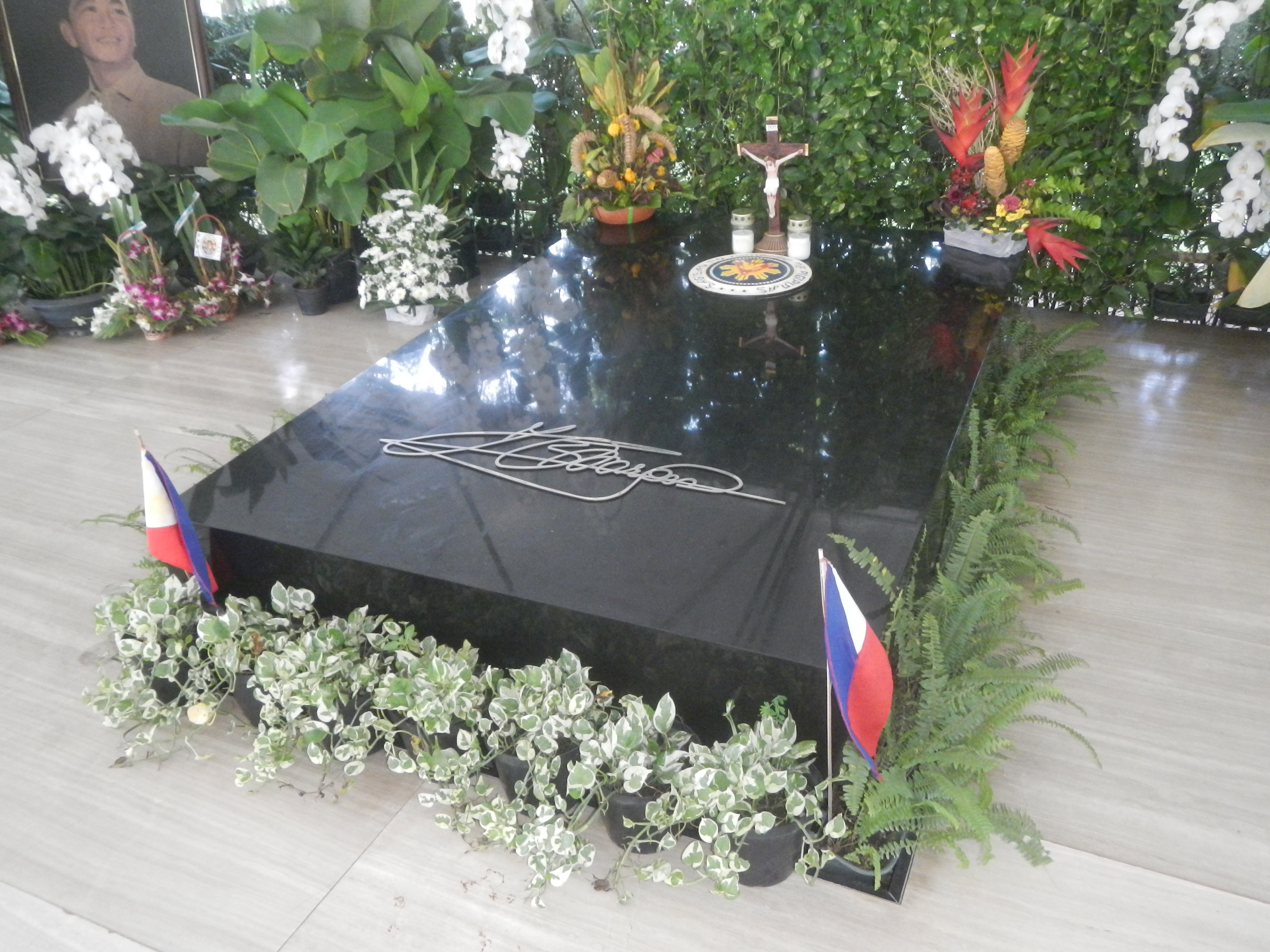
- The grave of Ferdinand Marcos at the Libingan ng mga Bayani, taken in 2018
- Date: November 18, 2016; July 11, 1998 (cancelled)
- Location: Libingan ng mga Bayani, Fort Bonifacio, Taguig, Metro Manila, Philippines
- Type: Burial
- Burial: Ferdinand Marcos

The burial of Ferdinand Marcos, a former Philippine President who ruled as a dictator for 20 years, took place on November 18, 2016, at the Libingan ng mga Bayani (lit. 'Cemetery of (the) Heroes') in Fort Andres Bonifacio, Taguig, Metro Manila, Philippines. Ferdinand Marcos had been elected the 10th President of the Philippines in 1965, but declared Martial Law in 1972 before his final constitutionally allowed term was over, holding on to power until his overthrow by the People Power Revolution in 1986.

The burial of Marcos, who died in 1989, at the Libingan ng mga Bayani has been a controversial issue as objectors, including victims of human rights violations during the dictator's brutal period of rule and participants of the People Power Revolution, have opposed attempts to bury Marcos citing the rampant corruption and cronyism of his administration; its practice of silencing dissent through arrests, disappearances, and torture by the police and military; and his family's infamous kleptocracy amounting to an estimated US$10 billion worth of stolen money that had earned Ferdinand and his wife Imelda. Opinion on his burial was split: 50% of the 1,800 respondents of a survey conducted by SWS in February 2016 said Marcos "was worthy to be buried at the Libingan ng mga Bayani" while the other half rejected a hero's burial for Marcos.

There were conflicting claims on where the deceased Marcos wished to be buried. Former Interior Secretary Rafael Alunan III, one of the signatories of an agreement to move Marcos' body from Hawaii to the Philippines during the term of then-President Fidel V. Ramos, said that Marcos wished to be buried beside his mother Josefa in his hometown in Batac, Ilocos Norte, while his wife Imelda Marcos said that his wish was to be buried in Manila insisting that he should be buried at the Libingan ng mga Bayani.

Former presidents Corazon Aquino, who had ousted Marcos during the People Power Revolution, and Fidel V. Ramos had opposed moves to bury Marcos at the Libingan ng mga Bayani during their respective terms, while former president Joseph Estrada attempted to bury Marcos at the Libingan ng mga Bayani but later canceled the burial. President Benigno Aquino III, Corazon Aquino's son, decided not to allow the body of Marcos to be buried at the cemetery. His successor Rodrigo Duterte, during the campaign period and debates as well as when he had won the presidential election, repeatedly asserted his plans for the burial of the remains, claiming that the act was in accordance with the existing laws of the Philippines and insisting that the burial would be an instrument for the beginning of "nation-wide healing". The plan was met with criticism due to its perceived historical revisionism. After it was delayed on September 13, 2016, then again on October 18 that same year, the Supreme Court permitted, on November 8, Ferdinand Marcos' burial at the Libingan ng mga Bayani. The burial of Marcos, with military honors, was conducted in a private ceremony on November 18, 2016 and resulted in nationwide protests by groups, sectors, and personalities opposing the burial of Marcos at the state cemetery.

== Background ==
=== Transfer of Marcos' body from Hawaii ===
After Ferdinand Marcos died in 1989, his family attempted to bring his remains from Hawaii to the Philippines but then-President Corazon Aquino imposed a ban against the entry of Marcos' remains into the country. This was lifted on October 9, 1991, by Aquino on the condition that Marcos' burial would not be used for political purposes and on the condition that the body of Marcos be flown directly to Laoag. Executive Secretary Franklin Drilon said that a "hero's burial" would be allowed if held in Marcos' home province instead of Manila. Imelda Marcos, the wife of Ferdinand Marcos, opposed the move saying that the dying wish of her husband was to be buried in Manila. In January 1992, the Philippine government stated that it may not oppose the burial of Marcos anywhere in Metro Manila provided that Marcos' body was flown into the country after the 1992 Philippine election in May. The Marcos family opposed the condition and was waiting for a ruling of the Supreme Court at that time regarding their petition to bury Ferdinand Marcos as soon as possible.

The transfer of Marcos' body would not be done until the administration of President Fidel V. Ramos. It was during Ramos' term that a memorandum of agreement was made between the government and the Marcos family in 1992.

There were four conditions agreed by both parties:

1. The remains of Ferdinand Marcos were to be flown directly from the US state of Hawaii to the province of Ilocos Norte.
2. Military honors for someone with the rank of major were to be given to Marcos. This was the last rank to be held by Marcos during his service with the Armed Forces of the Philippines.
3. No parade displaying Marcos' body was to be held in Metro Manila.
4. Marcos' body was not to be buried at the Libingan ng mga Bayani but in Ilocos Norte.

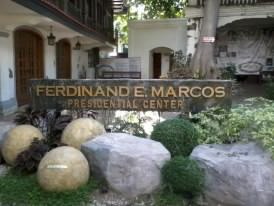
The body of Ferdinand Marcos was stored in a refrigerated crypt at the Ferdinand E. Marcos Presidential Center in Batac, Ilocos Norte until 2016.

According to Rafael Alunan III, former Interior Secretary and one of the signatories of the agreement, the third clause was agreed upon due to "wounds [that] were still fresh in the minds of many people" and to avoid potential instability. He also said that the former President Marcos wanted to be buried beside his mother in Batac, Ilocos Norte. Also according to Alunan, after the signing of the agreement, Imelda Marcos crossed out the burial clause and wrote in that Marcos was to be "temporarily interred" instead of being buried in Ilocos Norte. Alunan said that the terms of agreement could not be changed after it was signed but Mrs. Marcos insisted and came up with a new agreement paper with the changed clause. The revised paper was not signed by the government.

It was on September 7, 1993, that the body of Ferdinand Marcos was flown into the Philippines. From Hawaii the body was flown to Guam then to Laoag in Ilocos Norte. The body of Marcos was not buried but was instead preserved in a refrigerated crypt hosted inside the Ferdinand E. Marcos Presidential Center. In Honolulu, Hawaii, Marcos' body was also stored in a refrigerated crypt.

=== Cancelled 1998 Libingan ng mga Bayani burial ===
Ramos' successor Joseph Estrada attempted to organize a burial of Marcos at the Libingan ng mga Bayani. Then President-elect Estrada had negotiations with Marcos' wife Imelda who initially also demanded state honors for the burial but later agreed to a burial without state honors. It was determined that Marcos would be buried on July 11, 1998. The planned burial of Marcos at the Libingan ng mga Bayani still received opposition even after state honors were not to be included in the planned burial. Former President Corazon Aquino was among those who opposed the move. Estrada remained firm on his decision until July 1998 when Estrada decided against the plan amidst public opposition saying that it would be better if the Marcos family agreed that Ferdinand Marcos be buried in Batac to put an end to "bitter differences" and give rest to "various emotions and sentiments that flared up".

=== 2011 Batac burial recommendation ===
In April 2011, then President Benigno Aquino III tasked then Vice President Jejomar Binay to study whether to bury Marcos at the Libingan ng mga Bayani or not. The Office of the Vice President received 3,000 responses from various political parties, sectors, organizations, and members of the public on the issue. Binay recommended the burial of Marcos in his hometown of Batac with full military honors. Aquino did not act on the recommendation.

=== Presidency of Rodrigo Duterte and plans for the burial ===
Rodrigo Duterte supported the burial of Ferdinand Marcos at the Libingan ng mga Bayani, even before he assumed presidency and expressed this stance at his presidential campaign in the 2016 elections. Duterte has expressed that a burial of Marcos at the site would commence the "healing" of the Philippines and pointed out Marcos' idealism and vision for the country through his projects which "stood the test of time" and that Marcos' dictatorship "remains to be debated". Duterte previously stated that Marcos could have been the best president if not for the abuses during the Martial law period under Marcos' watch. At the Visayas leg of the PiliPinas Debates 2016, Duterte and fellow candidate Jejomar Binay expressed their support for a Marcos burial at the Libingan ng mga Bayani.

== 2016 burial ==
=== Announcement and rationale ===
On August 7, 2016, President Rodrigo Duterte gave the order to bury former President Ferdinand Marcos at the Libingan ng mga Bayani saying that Marcos was qualified to be buried at the cemetery due to being a "former president and a soldier". Duterte said he was open to demonstrations against the burial plan but insisted that the former president was qualified to be buried at the cemetery. He also added that the burial date may be moved to September 11 which was the birthday of the deceased president.

Amidst criticism that Marcos did not deserve to be buried at the cemetery, Duterte said that burying Marcos at the site did not equate to Marcos being a "hero in the true sense of the word". He pointed out that former soldiers and presidents are allowed to be buried at the cemetery and that he would be violating the law if he did not push through with the burial and added that the previous administrations should have passed a law to bar Marcos from being buried at the Libingan ng mga Bayani. Duterte said he doesn't care about the dispute regarding the authenticity of Marcos' war medals and the non-appearance of Marcos' alleged World War II service in United States records. While at Peru attending the 2016 APEC Summit during the burial day, he even said of Marcos: “Whether or not he performed worse or better, there is no study, there is no movie about it. It's just the challenges and allegations of the other side, which is not enough.” These insinuations however were disputed by many individuals and organizations - providing an exhaustive list of books, movies among other related media, about Marcos and/or Martial Law.

=== "Ilibing Na" ("Bury now") PR campaign ===
In 2018, Dr. Jason Cabañes of the University of Leeds School of Media and Communication and Dr. Jonathan Corpus Ong of the University of Massachusetts Amherst released a study of organized disinformation efforts in the Philippines, titled "Architects of Networked Disinformation: Behind the Scenes of Troll Accounts and Fake News Production in the Philippines." Based on participant observation in Facebook community groups and Twitter accounts, as well as key informant interviews with 20 "disinformation architects," conducted from December 2016 to December 2017, the study described a "professionalized and hierarchized group of political operators who design disinformation campaigns, mobilize click armies, and execute innovative “digital black ops” and “signal scrambling” techniques for any interested political client." This network had “ad and PR strategists at the top.”

Ong and Cabañes' 2018 study uncovered the existence of a "Ilibing Na" ("Bury now") campaign designed to create public support for a hero's burial for Ferdinand Marcos using "diversionary tactics to elude allegations of human rights violations and corruption during the term of Ferdinand Marcos" and launching "digital black ops that targeted prominent critics” of the Marcoses, particularly vice president Leni Robredo."

The study also revealed that these networks had previously launched a "personal branding" campaign meant to "tell a revisionist account of the 20-year Marcos regime as 'the golden age of the Philippines'" using such tools as YouTube videos "in a bid to restore the political luster of the Marcos family."

=== Supreme Court decision ===
Saturnino C. Ocampo, et al. v. Rear Admiral Ernesto C. Enriquez, et al.
- Court: Supreme Court of the Philippines
- Full case name: List (7): Saturnino C. Ocampo, et al. v. Rear Admiral Ernesto C. Enriquez, et al.; Rep. Edcel C. Lagman, Families of Victims of Involuntary Disappearance (FIND), et al. v. Executive Secretary Salvador C. Medialdea, et al.; Loretta Ann Pargas-Rosales, et al. v. Executive Secretary Salvador C. Medialdea, et al.; Heherson T. Alvarez, et al. v. Executive Secretary Salvador C. Medialdea, et al.; Zaira Patricia B. Baniaga, et al. v. Secretary of National Defense, et al.; Algamar A. Latiph v. Secretary Delfin Lorenzana, et al.; Senator Leila M. De Lima v. Executive Secretary Salvador C. Medialdea, et al.
- Decided: November 8, 2016
- Citations: G.R. No. 225973; G.R. No. 225984; G.R. No. 226097; G.R. No. 226116; G.R. No. 226117; G.R. No. 226120; G.R. No. 226294

Questions presented
- Constitutional validity of the interment of the remains of President Ferdinand Marcos in the Libingan ng mga Bayani

Court membership
- Judges sitting: Maria Lourdes Sereno, Antonio Carpio, Presbitero Velasco, Teresita de Castro, Arturo Brion, Diosdado Peralta, Lucas Bersamin, Mariano del Castillo, Jose P. Perez, Jose C. Mendoza, Bienvenido Reyes Estela Perlas-Bernabe, Marvic Leonen, Francis Jardeleza and Alfredo Benjamin Caguioa

Case opinions
- Decision by: Justices Diosdado Peralta
- Concurrence: Brion, Velasco Jr, Peralta, Bersamin, Del Castillo, Perez, De Castro, Mendoza and Perlas-Bernabe
- Dissent: De facto Chief Justice Sereno and Justices Carpio, Leonen, Jardeleza and Caguioa

Marcos was originally scheduled to be buried on September 13 then October 18 after the oral arguments on petitions to stop the burial. Eventually, on November 8, the Supreme Court of the Philippines allowed Marcos to be buried at the Libingan ng mga Bayani with the votes of 9–5, with one abstention dismissing the status quo ante imposed to block attempts to bury Marcos in the Libingan ng mga Bayani.

Supreme Court decision regarding the burial of Ferdinand Marcos at the Libingan ng mga Bayani
In Favor (9)	Opposed (5)
Arturo Brion; Presbitero Velasco Jr.; Diosdado Peralta; Lucas Bersamin; Mariano del Castillo; Jose Perez; Teresita Leonardo-de Castro; Jose Mendoza; Estela Perlas-Bernabe	Maria Lourdes Sereno (de facto Chief Justice); Antonio Carpio (Senior Associate Justice); Marvic Leonen; Francis Jardeleza; Alfredo Benjamin Caguioa
Abstained (1): Bienvenido Reyes

==== Concurring opinion ====
The concurring judges said that the Supreme Court cannot decide on the matter since it is a political question which was deemed not justiciable. They argue that President Duterte did not abuse his discretion when he allowed the burial of Marcos at the Libingan ng mga Bayani. It was noted that the petitioners failed to specify a specific law that was allegedly violated by proceeding the burial.

The majority of the judges disagreed with the dissenting opinion that Marcos is disqualified to be buried at the said site due to Marcos' ouster following the People Power Revolution, which the dissenters consider as an act of Marcos being dishonorably discharged. It was noted that while Marcos was also the Commander-in-Chief of the Armed Forces of the Philippines, the position is not a military position and the particular clause in the 1987 Constitution which gave the designation to Marcos only enshrines the principle of supremacy of civilian authority over the military. It was concluded that Marcos could not be prosecuted before the court martial therefore he could not be "dishonorably discharged, reverted or separated" under the AFP Regulations G 161–1375. Marcos ouster through the People Power Revolution is judged to be extra-constitutional and direct sovereign act of the people which was concluded to be outside the scope of the court. Marcos was also found not to have been convicted of crimes involving moral turpitude and court cases cited by the petitioners abroad were decided to have no bearing due to the cases being civil in nature.

It was added that it's up to the people to decide on the matter. The concurring judges also clarified that the court is exercising judicial restraint on an issue they say is "truly political in nature" and that the resulting stigma of Ferdinand Marcos' martial law regime will "not be forgotten by the Filipino people" and Marcos' burial at the cemetery "will not rewrite history".

==== Dissenting opinion ====
De facto Chief Justice Maria Lourdes Sereno said that the burial disregards both international and domestic laws with regards to giving justice to victims of human rights abuses during Marcos' term. The Philippine government was noted to have an obligation to provide compensations to the victims, both monetary and non-monetary, the latter of which includes symbolic reparation. The burial of Marcos at the Libingan ng mga Bayani was deemed by the dissenters as contrary to symbolic reparation entitled to the victims. By allowing the burial, President Duterte was "encouraging impunity". Marcos was described as "a dictator forced out of office and into exile after causing twenty years of political, economic, and social havoc in the country".

Senior Associate Justice Antonio Carpio argued that Marcos' ouster following the People Power Revolution disqualified him from being buried at the Libingan ng mga Bayani even if the claim of him being awarded the Medal of Valor is indisputable since he was deposed by the "sovereign action of the people", which was described as "the strongest form of dishonorable discharge from office".

=== Preparation ===
Following the Supreme Court decision, preparations for the burial commenced. Ilocos Norte Governor and daughter of Ferdinand Marcos, Imee Marcos said that the burial will be done with "simple rites like an ordinary soldier", and insisted that the event will not be a state funeral but a "funeral for a soldier" which she said her father wished for. She also added that the family was willing to airlift the former President's remains from Batac to Fort Bonifacio.

Santa Monica Church in Sarrat, the Immaculate Conception Church in Batac, and the Saint Augustine Church in Paoay were earlier prepared for the wake for former President Marcos before the burial at the Libingan ng mga Bayani.

=== Burial ===
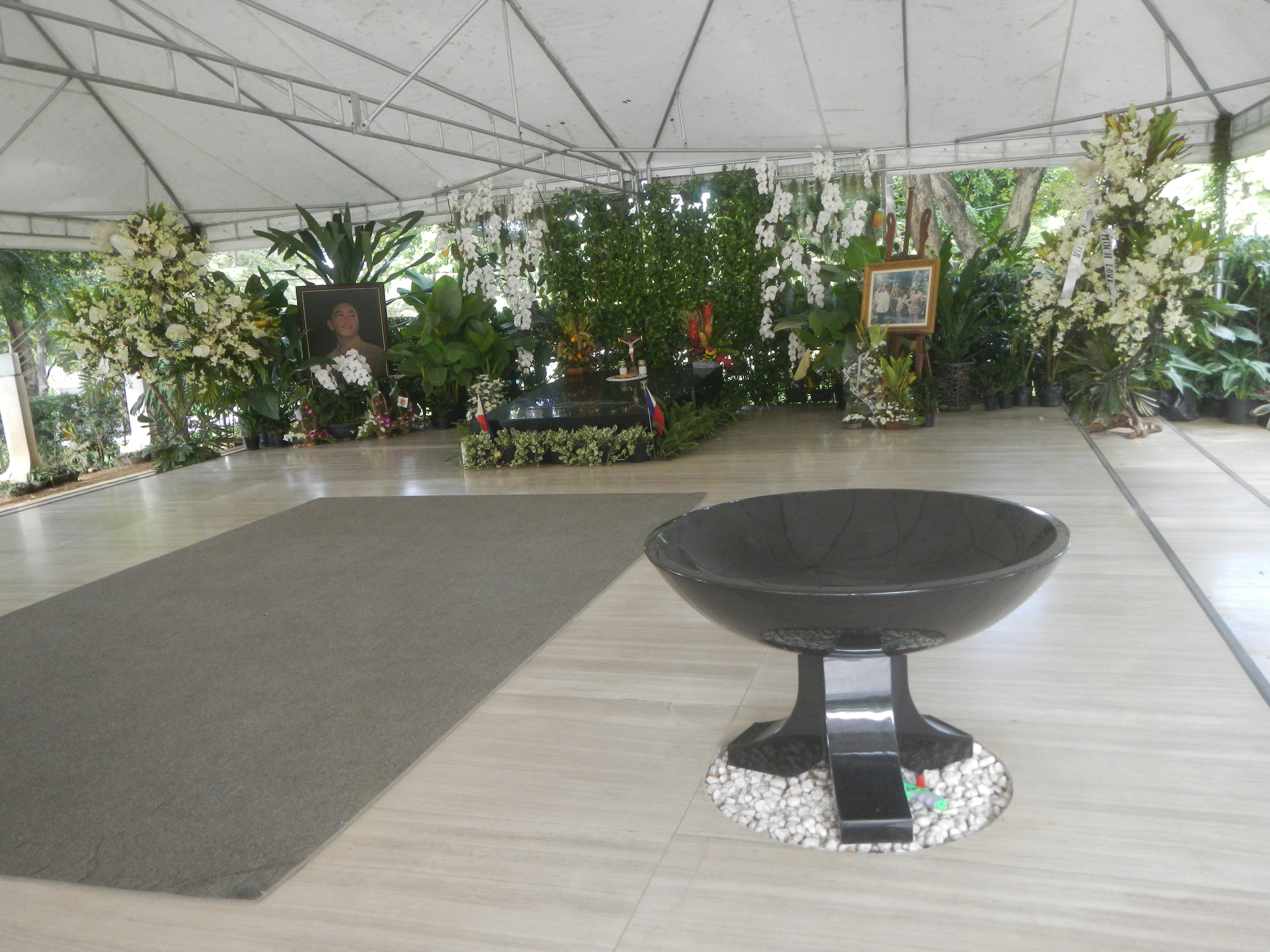
Marcos's tomb shown with a cauldron

The Philippine National Police were informed on the night of November 17, 2016, that the burial will take place the day after. The police confirmed the scheduled burial in the morning of November 18. The November 18 burial was scheduled to take place at noon.

The remains of Ferdinand Marcos were airlifted from Ilocos Norte at 9:00 a.m. and were brought to the Libingan ng mga Bayani in Fort Bonifacio in Taguig, Metro Manila. Marcos was then buried in his grave at the Libingan ng mga Bayani in a burial ceremony closed to the public. Marcos' wife Imelda Marcos and his children were in attendance, as well as the late president's only living sibling at the time, Fortuna Marcos-Barba. About a hundred were in attendance including personnel from the Armed Forces of the Philippines, and reportedly Philippine National Police (PNP) Chief Ronald dela Rosa. Military honors were given including a 21-gun salute during the rites.

There was no public announcement of the burial plan, and the public only became aware of the plan shortly before the burial. The Marcos family requested the government to conduct the burial in private, and confidentially. A budget was allocated by the government on the burial and the exceeding budget reportedly will be shouldered by the Marcoses. No exact figures regarding the budget allocated for the burial rites were disclosed.

Ferdinand Marcos was buried in a marble finished tomb with a cauldron that has a flame burning inside.

== Reactions and protests ==
=== Public opinion about the Burial ===
A poll conducted by the Social Weather Stations (SWS) in March 2011 showed that opinion is split. The same trend appears in a follow-up poll by SWS in February 2016. However, the audience of the 2016 poll was validated voters, as opposed to anyone aged 18 years and above (as was the case in the 2011 poll).

1. No, not worthy of the Libingan ng mga Bayani (49.0%)
2. Yes, with official honors (30.0%)
3. Yes, a private burial only (20.0%)
4. Don't Know/Refused to answer (1.00%)
1. Yes, worthy to be buried at the Libingan ng Mga Bayani (50.0%)
2. No (50.0%)

=== Political reactions against the Burial ===
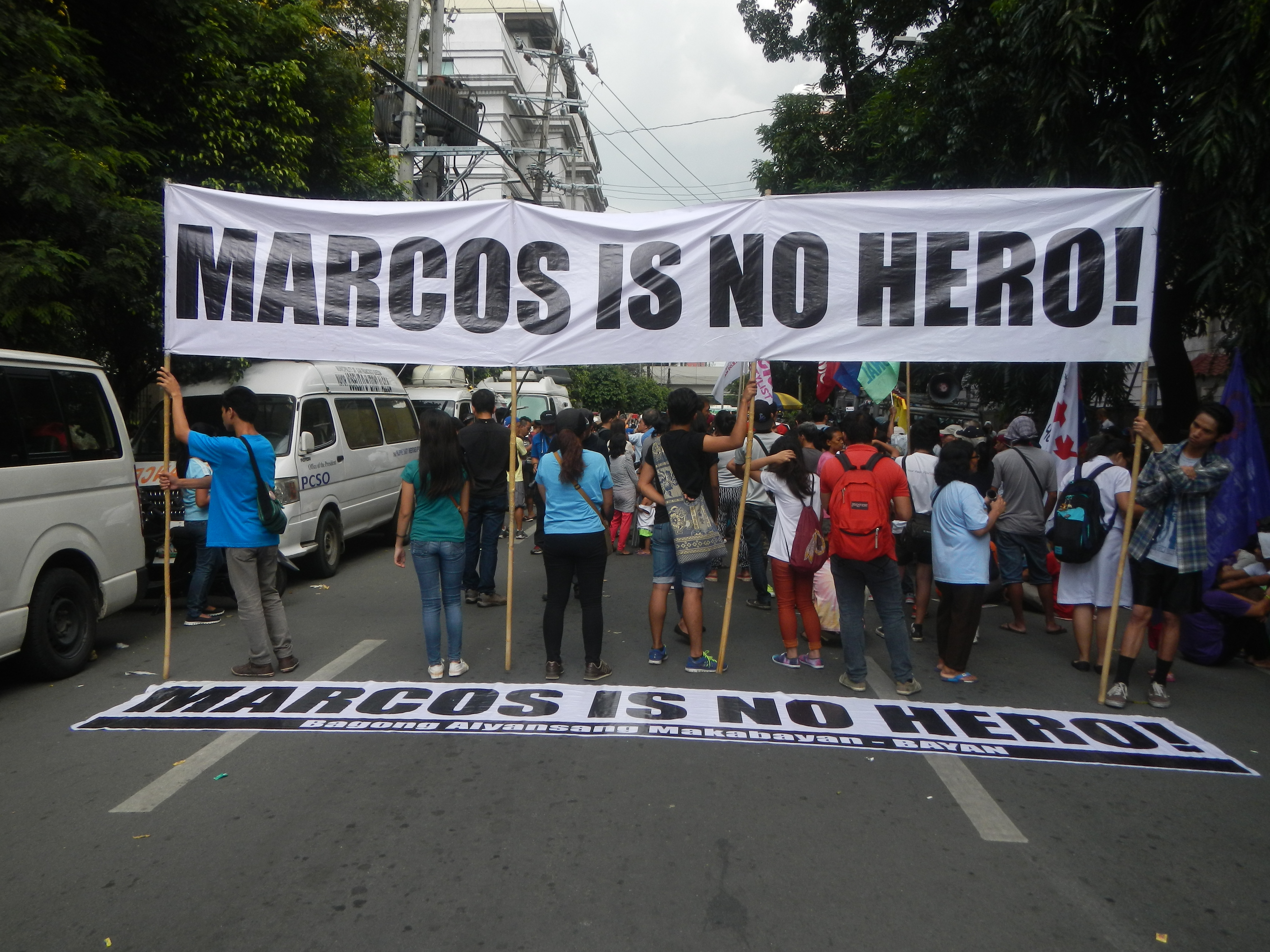
Protesters opposing the burial of Marcos.

On July 17, 2016, a group of people participated in a protest run around the Quezon Memorial Circle in Quezon City led by Catholic priest Robert Reyes. Reyes said, "whom, in the minds of martial law victims, is a traitor and dictator, is a terrible insult to history and the country itself." About 2,000 people protested against the burial plans, saying that Marcos was not a hero; organizers clarified that the protests were not against the Duterte administration itself, but were targeted towards the burial plan. An initiative called Bawat Bato (lit. 'For each stone') was launched, urging those who oppose the plan to dump stones with names of victims of abuses during the Martial Law era of Ferdinand Marcos or a personal message at the proposed site of the burial of Marcos within the Libingan ng mga Bayani. On September 30, the Ateneo de Manila University wrote a memorandum encouraging its community to wear black T-shirts during UAAP Season 79 sports games to protest the Marcos burial at the Libingan ng mga Bayani.

On November 6, former President Benigno Aquino III described the burial as a "desecration" of the Libingan ng mga Bayani. The next day, Aquino briefly joined the crowd at the Luneta for the "Pray for 8" event, a prayer rally calling at least eight justices of the Supreme Court to vote against the interment of Marcos. Former DILG secretary Mar Roxas and senator Francis Pangilinan later joined the group. On November 11, the martial law victims filed a temporary injunction against the burial before the Supreme Court. Various groups and sectors also joined the rally, protesting the burial. On November 12, hundreds of people, protesting the burial, participated in the run at the University of the Philippines Diliman. Lawyers and law students wore black T-shirts November 13 and rallied in front of the University of Santo Tomas where the bar exams held. The Bagong Alyansang Makabayan (BAYAN) called on November 14 for widespread demonstrations across the country, hoping to discourage President Rodrigo Duterte from proceeding the burial. On November 16, the Sangguniang Laiko ng Pilipinas (Council of the Laity of the Philippines) calls the planned hero's burial of Marcos "barefaced disrespect".

In Cebu City, a day before the burial, an effigy of Marcos, the same look as he kept in a refrigerated mausoleum, was displayed in a garbage cart, deserving to put as a garbage said by at least 500 members of militant groups. Retired Judge Mienrado Paredes, who is among the person jailed during the martial law, said that "the real heroes are the people. Marcos was garbage in history. He is not a hero." (Note: "We will repeat that—they are on the wrong side of history," he said. "Ang tinuod nga bayani ang mga tawo ... So basura siya (Marcos) sa kasaysayan. Dili siya bayani (The real heroes are the people. Marcos was garbage in history. He is not a hero).")

On August 8, Senator Risa Hontiveros filed Senate Resolution 86 which opposed the planned burial of Marcos, citing his dictatorship. On November 14, the Senate voted on the resolution; among the 20 senators present, eight senators voted for the resolution to block Marcos burial, namely Senate President Koko Pimentel, Senate President Pro Tempore Franklin Drilon, Bam Aquino, Leila de Lima, Francis Pangilinan, Grace Poe, and Joel Villanueva. Meanwhile, six senators voted against the resolution: Dick Gordon, Gregorio Honasan, Panfilo Lacson, Manny Pacquiao, Tito Sotto, and Cynthia Villar, while six senators abstained: Sonny Angara, Nancy Binay, Francis Escudero, Win Gatchalian, Ralph Recto, and Migz Zubiri. The absent senators were Alan Peter Cayetano, JV Ejercito, Loren Legarda, and Antonio Trillanes. Receiving only 8 out of the 11 'yes' votes needed to pass, the resolution failed.

On November 18, the day of Marcos burial, various groups gathered in some places. Among those who gathered to oppose the burial was a group of youth. The League of Filipino Students described the transfer of Marcos remains for the eventually successful burial the former president as being done like "a thief in the night." They also criticized the government's involvement in the burial of the former president which they describe as a "fascist dictator".

Vice President Leni Robredo expressed disappointment stating that "like a thief in the night, the Marcos family deliberately hid the information of burying former President Marcos today from the Filipino people." Students from various universities and other groups joined the protest held across the country including Metro Manila, Cebu City, Davao City, etc. Senator Franklin Drilon gave a statement about the burial, "like what Marcos did for 21 years, he caught us off-guard like a thief in the night. His burial is anything but noble. Even in death, he is a thief." Senator Risa Hontiveros, who opposed the burial, said that "no hero's burial can erase the historical fact of Marcos' atrocities." Senator Aquilino Pimentel III said the burial was a "sad development." Former President Fidel Ramos criticized the burial of the late president, describing it as "a step backward".

On November 25, 2016, the day called by the protestors "National Day of Unity and Rage" and "Black Friday", various groups in the country held mass demonstrations in the afternoon. Left-leaning groups called on President Duterte to end his alliance with Marcoses. Anti-Marcos protestors and Marcos loyalists started a debate on the issue after the two sides made an encounter.

Maris Diokno, chairperson of the National Historical Commission of the Philippines (NHCP) submitted her resignation on November 29, 2016, in protest of the Marcos burial. She said that the burial "erases the memory of the lives lost and destroyed" during the Ferdinand Marcos administration and that it "mocks the collective action the Filipinos" took to remove Marcos from his post as president. She added that Duterte could have taken a "higher ground" by disallowing the burial despite the Supreme Court decision not to stop the then burial plan. She also praised the youth who expressed their opposition to the burial which she described as an act "in defense of History" and said she would personally join mass demonstrations scheduled on November 30, 2016. Her resignation was effective on December 1, 2016.

Thousands of protesters gathered again on November 30, Bonifacio Day, at the People Power Monument in Quezon City. On December 10, about 11,000 protesters marched on the streets in Capiz, Iloilo, Bacolod, Aklan, and Cebu, commemorating Human Rights Day. On the night of December 15, about 150 members of a group called Coalition against Marcos Burial gathered at the People Power Monument to attend the mass. Thousands of people also celebrated the 31st anniversary of 1986 People Power Revolution on February 25, 2017, with protests.

=== Reactions from Philippine Catholic church leaders ===
2013–2017 Catholic Bishops' Conference of the Philippines (CBCP) president Lingayen-Dagupan Archbishop Socrates Villegas, a protégé of late Manila Archbishop Jaime Sin during EDSA 1986, said through text to Rappler, on the same day, that he is saddened with the decision and "the burial is an insult to the EDSA spirit". Villegas also stated that he backed the anti-Marcos protests.

Unlike Villegas, then-Lipa Archbishop Ramon Arguelles, who was still the sitting Lipa Archbishop, called on Filipinos for prayers and forgiveness for the Marcos family, encouraging pro and anti-Marcos groups to pray for Marcos' soul, while condemning groups calling for exhumation with the words "give the dead peace, respect Marcos' body".

Manila Archbishop Cardinal Luis Antonio Tagle remained silent on the burial and instead chose to offer prayers for the Marcos family and the Filipinos. The late Leopoldo S. Tumulak of the Military Ordinariate of the Philippines echoed the same sentiments of Arguelles.

== Proposed exhumation ==
Since the burial, some individuals and groups called for the exhumation of Marcos' remains at the cemetery. Among them were Albay Representative Edcel Lagman, who in 2016 said "whatever was buried there" should be exhumed to determine if the remains were Marcos' "mortal remains" and not a wax replica. In 2018, the Supreme Court rejected a petition to have the remains exhumed, although activists called anew to remove the remains from the cemetery following Imelda Marcos' conviction of graft.

== See also ==
- Unexplained wealth of the Marcos family
- Human rights abuses of the Marcos dictatorship
