= Rosmari Carandang =

Associate Justice of the Supreme Court of the Philippines

The Honorable Rosmari Carandang
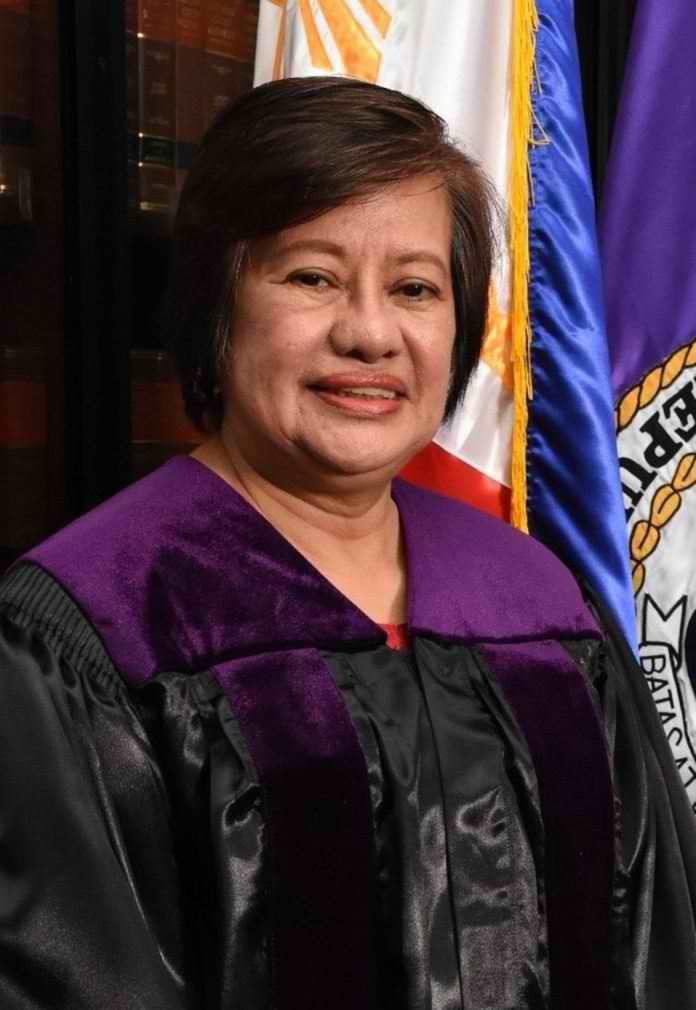

181st Associate Justice of the Supreme Court of the Philippines
- In office November 26, 2018 – January 9, 2022
- Appointed by: Rodrigo Duterte
- Preceded by: Teresita de Castro
- Succeeded by: Antonio Kho Jr.

Personal details
- Born: Rosmari Declaro Carandang; January 9, 1952 (age 74) Illog, Taal, Batangas, Philippines
- Education: University of the Philippines (BA, LLB)
- Affiliation: Tau Gamma Sigma

Rosmari Declaro Carandang (born January 9, 1952) is a retired associate justice of the Supreme Court of the Philippines. She was appointed by President Rodrigo Duterte to replace then-Justice Teresita de Castro.

== Education ==
A college scholar for four semesters, she obtained her Bachelor of Arts in Political Science at the University of the Philippines. From the same university, she obtained her Bachelor of Laws graduating salutatorian of the class and Cum Laude in 1975. She garnered 9th place in the 1975 Bar examinations. She was also classmates with her colleague in the Court, Senior Associate Justice Antonio Carpio, who was the Valedictorian of the batch.

== Career ==
In December 1993, she was appointed Presiding Judge of the Regional Trial Court of Manila, Branch 12, serving also as one of its Vice-Executive Judges. She was appointed Associate Justice of the Court of Appeals in March 2003, serving the Court for over 15 years until her appointment to the Supreme Court of the Philippines.

=== Academic career ===
Carandang has also taught law at the Philippine Christian University and the Manuel L. Quezon University - School of Law.

=== Supreme Court appointment ===
On November 26, 2018, President Rodrigo Duterte appointed Carandang to the Supreme Court. Carandang retired on January 9, 2022, when she reached the mandatory retirement age of 70.

Legal offices
Preceded by Teresita de Castro	Associate Justice of the Supreme Court; 2018–2022	Succeeded by Antonio Kho Jr.
