= Ferdinand E. Marcos Presidential Center =

Museum in Ilocos Norte, Philippines

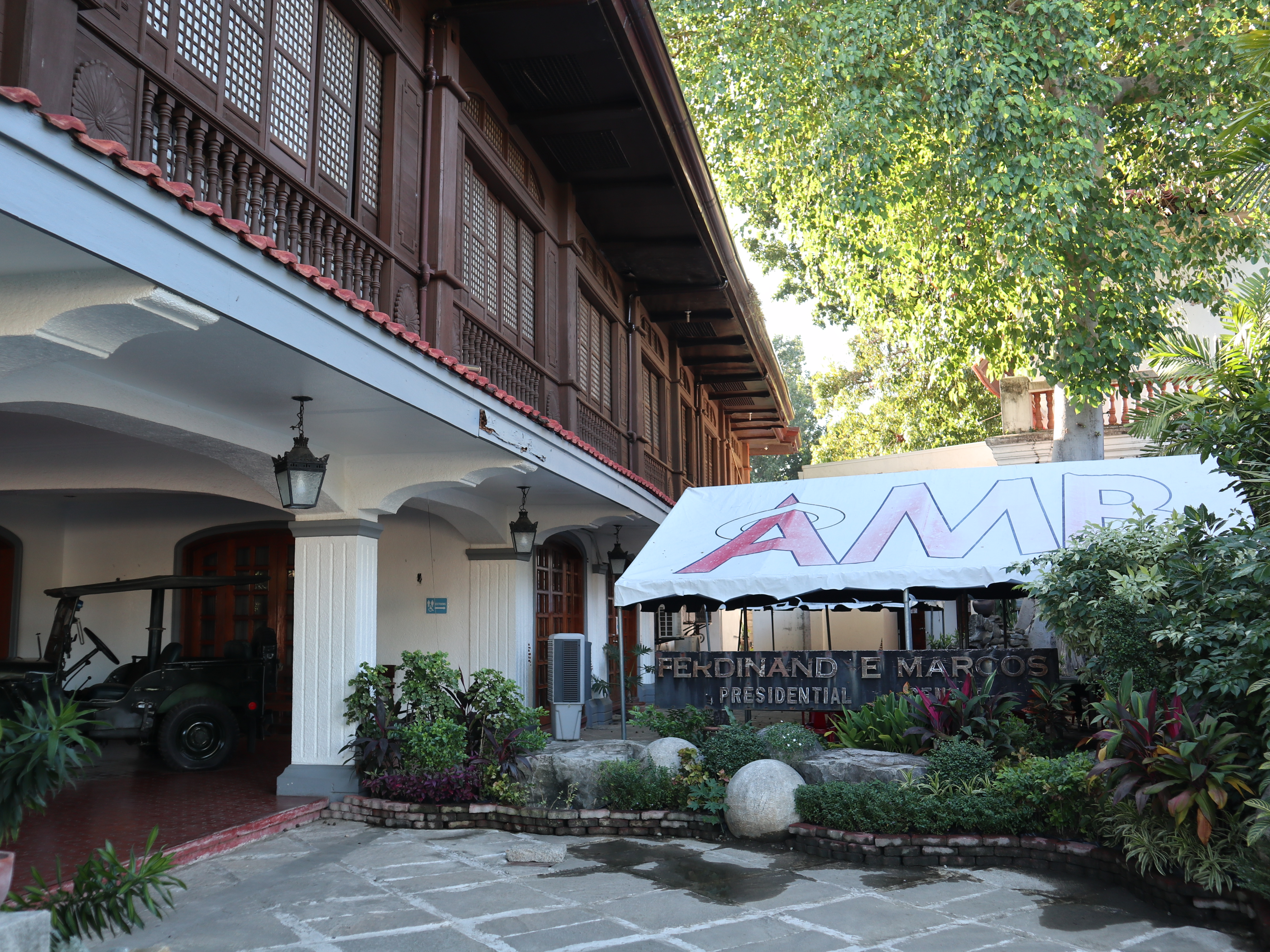
- The museum in 2022
- Location: Brgy. 10-N Lacub, Batac, Ilocos Norte
- Coordinates: 18°03′18″N 120°33′46″E

The Ferdinand E. Marcos Presidential Center is a museum situated in Batac, Ilocos Norte dedicated to 10th Philippine president and dictator Ferdinand Marcos which also hosts his cenotaph. The museum shows memorabilia of the late president, from his stint in the armed forces down to his presidency. The large cenotaph which contains the glass-encased coffin in which the widely believed embalmed body of Marcos was on public display shortly after his remains were brought in Ilocos Norte from the United States in 1993 until his body was re-interred at the Libingan ng mga Bayani in Taguig on November 18, 2016. A wax replica of Marcos remains to be displayed inside the glass coffin.

== History ==
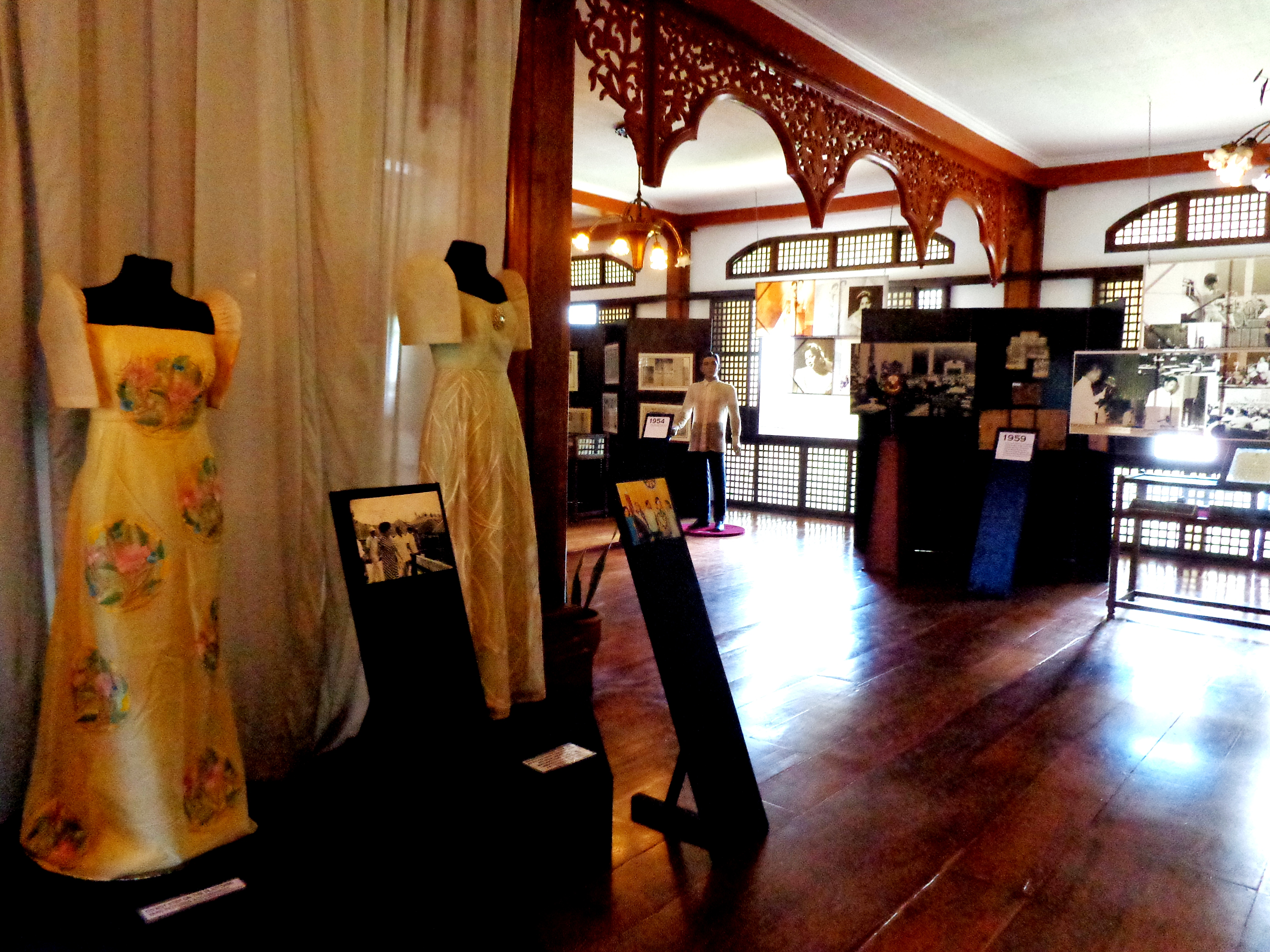
Museum interior in 2012

=== Ferdinand E. Marcos' death ===
On September 28, 1989, Marcos died of lung, kidney and liver complications in Hawaii, three years after he, his family and allies were exiled in 1986. Marcos fled the country in the face of a nonviolent "People Power Revolution", which set the end of his regime. The odyssey of his remains began when the government of President Corazon Aquino denied Marcos' return to the Philippines. Thus, Marcos' remains was interred in a private, air-conditioned mausoleum at Byodo-In, a Japanese Buddhist temple, on the island of Oahu.

=== Return of Marcos' remains ===
In September 1993, after having been kept in a refrigerated, glass-topped coffin inside an air-conditioned crypt for four years, Marcos' remains were finally taken to the Philippines. The newly elected president who succeeded Aquino, Fidel Ramos, second cousin of the late president, allowed Imelda Marcos, Marcos' widow, to bring her husband's body home but refused her demand for a hero's burial.

Eventually, after a series of rituals and ceremonies, Marcos' remains were interred in a mausoleum in his hometown for public display, according to his family President Benigno Aquino III, son of the late Corazon and Benigno Aquino Jr., tasked Jejomar Binay to determine if Marcos should be buried in the Libingan ng mga Bayani. Binay made his recommendation, though Aquino never made a decision. President Rodrigo Duterte approved Marcos's burial in the cemetery and was buried on November 18, 2016.

=== The remains of Ferdinand Marcos ===
Frank Malabed, Marcos' mortician, states that he has helped preserve the body during its interment at the former mausoleum in Batac. It took him three weeks to restore Marcos' body so that Filipinos would recognize it. Local morticians maintain and check it regularly. Formaldehyde was used to preserve the body before it was flown to the Philippines.

It was reported in August 2016, that Historian Antonio Montalvan II said that a close Marcos family friend of his revealed that the body displayed on the glass coffin was a wax figure and not the preserved remains of Ferdinand Marcos. Montalvan added that the real body of Marcos is buried underneath the glass coffin.

A wax replica of Marcos' remains was reportedly left inside the glass coffin on the day Marcos' real body was interred at the Libingan ng mga Bayani. There are reportedly two or three replicas of Marcos' body.

== See also ==
- Burial of Ferdinand Marcos
- Bantayog ng mga Bayani Center
- Proclamation No. 1081
- History of the Philippines (1965–86)
- Presidential Museum and Library (Philippines)
- Purna Bhakti Pertiwi Museum
- Kumsusan Palace of the Sun
