= Lucas Bersamin =

Chief Justice of the Philippines from 2018 to 2019

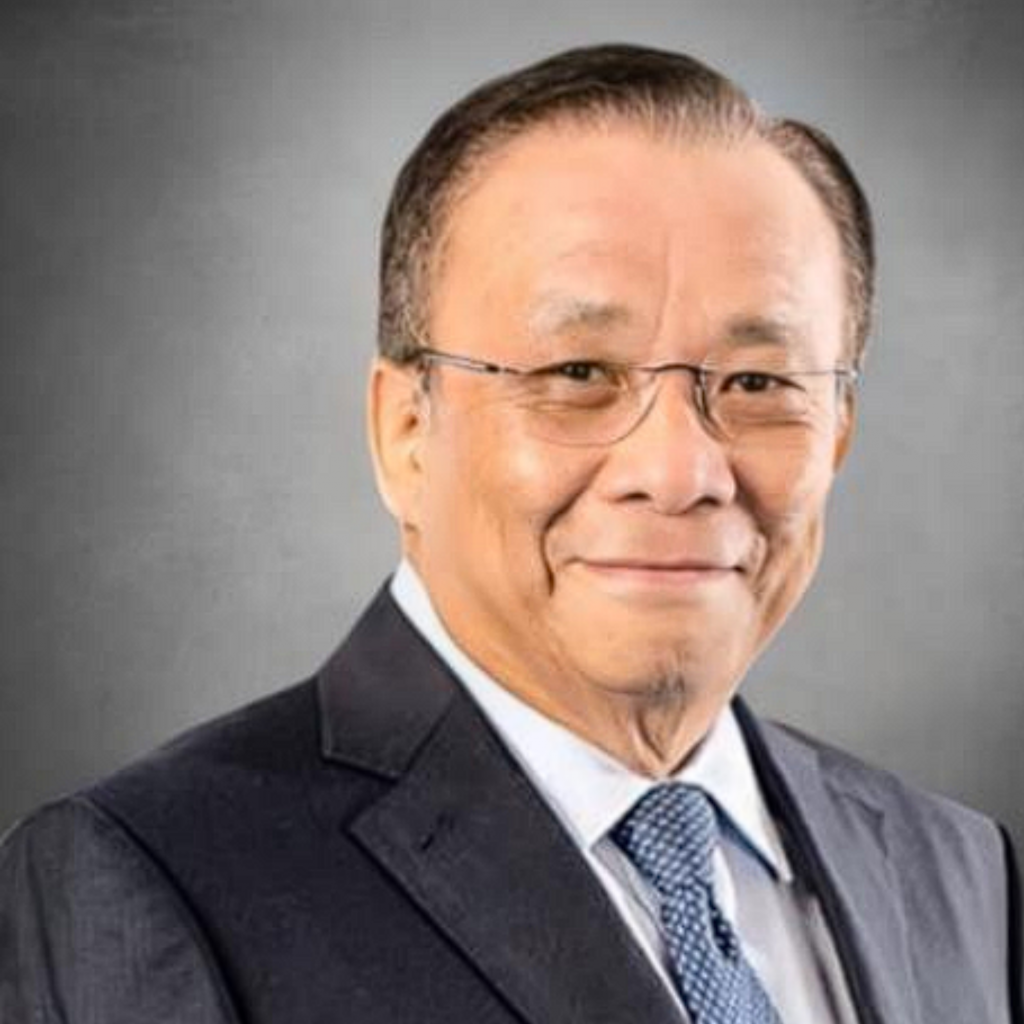
- Official Portrait, 2020

40th Executive Secretary of the Philippines
- In office September 27, 2022 – November 17, 2025
- President: Bongbong Marcos
- Preceded by: Vic Rodriguez
- Succeeded by: Ralph Recto

25th Chief Justice of the Supreme Court of the Philippines
- In office November 26, 2018 – October 18, 2019
- Appointed by: Rodrigo Duterte
- Preceded by: Teresita de Castro
- Succeeded by: Diosdado Peralta

163rd Associate Justice of the Supreme Court of the Philippines
- In office April 3, 2009 – November 28, 2018
- Appointed by: Gloria Macapagal Arroyo
- Preceded by: Adolfo Azcuna
- Succeeded by: Henri Jean Paul Inting

Chairman of the Government Service Insurance System
- In office February 6, 2020 – September 27, 2022
- Appointed by: Rodrigo Duterte
- Preceded by: Jesus Clint Aranas; Rolando Macasaet (OIC)
- Succeeded by: Jose Arnulfo Veloso (Acting)

Personal details
- Born: October 18, 1949 (age 76) Bangued, Abra, Philippines
- Party: Independent
- Spouse: Aurora Bagares
- Children: 3
- Education: University of the Philippines (BA); University of the East (LL.B.)
- Affiliation: SCINTILLA JURIS Fraternity

Lucas "Luke" Purugganan Bersamin (born October 18, 1949) is a Filipino lawyer and jurist who served as the 40th executive secretary of the Philippines under President Bongbong Marcos from 2022 until 2025. He previously served as the 25th chief justice of the Philippines from 2018 and 2019 and as an associate justice from 2009 to 2018.

A graduate of University of the Philippines Diliman and the University of the East College of Law, Bersamin entered the judiciary in 1986, when he became a trial court judge in Quezon City. In 2003, President Gloria Macapagal Arroyo appointed Bersamin to the Court of Appeals before she elevated him to the Supreme Court in 2009. President Rodrigo Duterte appointed him chief justice in 2018 before leaving the court a year later. After his departure, he chaired the Government Service Insurance System from 2020 to 2022 before being appointed as the executive secretary under President Marcos, but he was later fired by President Marcos in 2025 due to corruption allegations arising from the flood control scandal.

== Biography ==
Bersamin graduated as valedictorian from Colegio del Sagrado Corazon in Bangued in 1961 for his elementary education and from Saint Joseph Seminary, also in Bangued, in 1965 for his secondary education. He earned his undergraduate political science degree from the University of the Philippines Diliman in 1968 and graduated from the University of the East College of Law in 1973. He placed 9th in the 1973 Bar Examinations, with an average of 86.3%. He was then named a fellow at the Commonwealth Judicial Education Institute in Dalhousie University in Halifax, Nova Scotia, Canada.

== Career ==
=== Academic career ===
Bersamin was in private practice from 1974 until 1986, when he was appointed a trial court judge in Quezon City by President Corazon Aquino. Bersamin was a professor at the Ateneo de Manila Law School, the University of the East College of Law, and the University of Santo Tomas Faculty of Civil Law. He was special lecturer at the College of Law, University of Cebu in 2006. He continues to lecture for the Philippine Judicial Academy.

=== Legal career ===
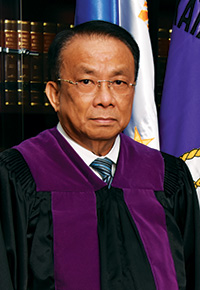
Official portrait of Lucas Bersamin as Associate Justice

In March 2003, Bersamin was elevated to the Court of Appeals by President Gloria Macapagal Arroyo. In April 2009, Bersamin was elevated by President Arroyo to associate justice of the Supreme Court of the Philippines. In July 2016, Bersamin was one of the Arroyo-appointed justices who voted to acquit Arroyo on the charges of plunder.

Bersamin was the ponente when the Supreme Court allowed Juan Ponce Enrile to post bail, disregarding the Ombudsman's argument that the Philippine Constitution disallows the posting of bail by people charged with plunder.

Bersamin was among the associate justices who voted in November 2016 to allow the burial of the late dictator Ferdinand Marcos at the Libingan ng mga Bayani.

In October 2017, Bersamin voted to uphold the warrant of arrest against Senator Leila de Lima. In December 2017, Bersamin voted to allow Duterte to extend for the third time martial law in Mindanao.

In August 2018, Bersamin voted to reverse the Ombudsman's indictment for plunder of Senator Jinggoy Estrada.

Bersamin was one of the associate justices who voted in favor of the quo warranto petition against Maria Lourdes Sereno, which led to the appointment of Teresita Leonardo-de Castro as new chief justice of the Philippines, replacing Maria Lourdes Sereno. President Rodrigo Duterte appointed Bersamin as the new chief justice on November 26, 2018, succeeding Teresita de Castro.

=== GSIS chairperson ===
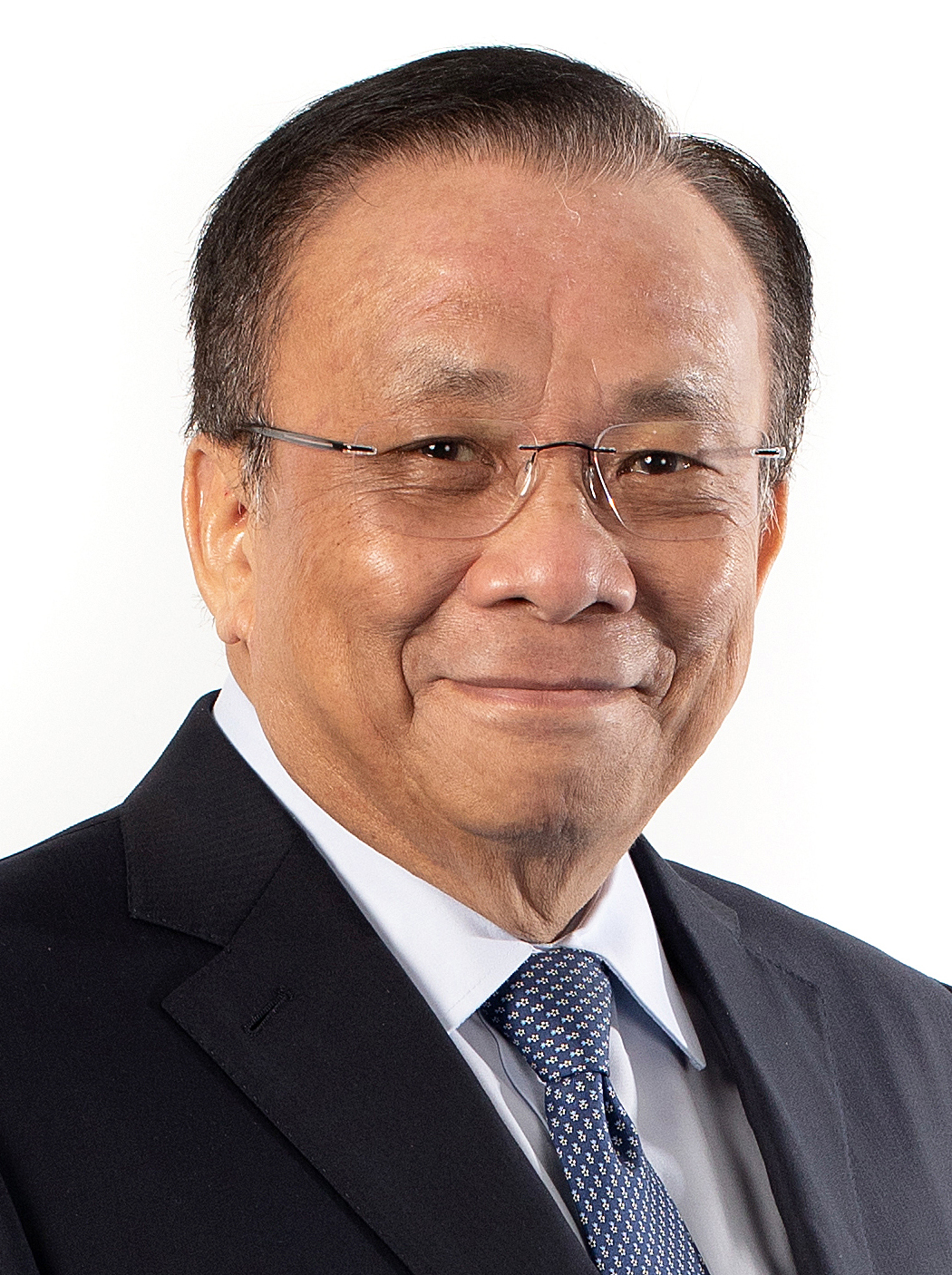
Official portrait of Bersamin during his tenure as GSIS Chairman from November 26, 2018 to October 18, 2019.

On February 6, 2020, Bersamin was appointed by Duterte to be the chairperson of the Government Service Insurance System (GSIS) and a member of the agency's board of trustees. He will serve the unexpired term of former GSIS president Jesus Clint Aranas, which ended on June 30, 2020.

=== Executive secretary ===
Bersamin was appointed by President Bongbong Marcos as his executive secretary, as confirmed by Press Secretary Trixie Cruz-Angeles on September 27, 2022.

The Supreme Court announced on February 5, 2025, that it issued writs of amparo and habeas data to the family of Felix Salaveria Jr., an environmental activist who was abducted in Tabaco City, Albay, on August 28, 2024. The issuance orders respondents Executive Secretary Lucas Bersamin, the Armed Forces of the Philippines, and the Philippine National Police to present information they may have on Salaveria.

On May 22, 2025, President Marcos ordered members of his cabinet to tender their courtesy resignations in the aftermath of the 2025 midterm elections. Bersamin complied but he says Marcos declined his courtesy resignation.

In September 2025 amid the flood control projects scandal in the Philippines, DPWH Undersecretary Roberto Bernardo alleged in a sworn statement that the Office of the Executive Secretary got a 15% kickback from ₱2.85 billion in flood-control projects, to be given to Malacañang. Bersamin denied the allegations. On November 18, 2025, Malacañang announced the resignation of Bersamin to allow him to be subject to further investigation. Bersamin denied filing a courtesy resignation, and said that he got a call telling him that he "has to exit as executive secretary". House Deputy Minority Leader Antonio Tinio (ACT party-list), House Assistant Minority Leader Renee Co (Kabataan party-list), and Gabriela party-list Representative Sarah Elago filed House Resolution 515 calling for a legislative probe on Bersamin, Representative Sandro Marcos, and other officials allegedly involved in the flood control corruption scandal.

Bersamin denied being the person identified in the Cabral files as "ES" (the abbreviation for "executive secretary"), who was allegedly assigned ₱8 billion in "allocable" funds in the 2025 national budget.

== Personal life ==
Bersamin is married to the former Aurora A. Bagares, a business proprietress, with whom he has three children: Pia Cristina, Luis Isidro, and Lucas Riel Jr.

He belongs to the Bersamin political dynasty of Abra: he is the brother of congressman Luis "Chito" Bersamin Jr. of Abra, who was gunned down in 2008 during a wedding ceremony, and of Abra governor Takit Bersamin. Abra vice governor Anne Bersamin is the daughter of Luis Bersamin. Presidential Legislative Liaison Office Undersecretary Adrian Bersamin is Lucas Bersamin's grandnephew.

Legal offices
Preceded by Adolfo Azcuna	Associate Justice of the Supreme Court of the Philippines; 2009–2018	Succeeded by Henri Jean Paul B. Inting
Preceded by Teresita de Castro	Chief Justice of the Supreme Court; 2018–2019	Succeeded by Diosdado Peralta
Political offices
Preceded by Victor Rodriguez	Executive Secretary of the Philippines; 2022–2025	Succeeded by Ralph Recto
