= Antonio Carpio =

Filipino judge (born 1949)

The Honorable Antonio Carpio
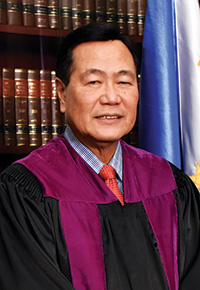

34th Senior Associate Justice of the Supreme Court of the Philippines
- In office November 6, 2009 – October 26, 2019
- Preceded by: Leonardo Quisumbing
- Succeeded by: Estela Perlas-Bernabe

148th Associate Justice of the Supreme Court of the Philippines
- In office October 26, 2001 – October 26, 2019
- Appointed by: Gloria Macapagal Arroyo
- Preceded by: Minerva Gonzaga Reyes
- Succeeded by: Edgardo Delos Santos

1st Chief Presidential Legal Counsel
- In office June 7, 1993 – June 30, 1998
- President: Fidel V. Ramos
- Preceded by: position established
- Succeeded by: Antonio Nachura

Personal details
- Born: October 26, 1949 (age 76) Davao City, Philippines
- Relations: Conchita Carpio-Morales (cousin); Mans Carpio (nephew); Diosdado Daño Tirol (nephew)
- Education: Ateneo de Manila University (BA); University of the Philippines Diliman (LLB)

Antonio Tirol Carpio (Tagalog pronunciation: [anˈtɔnjo ˈkaɾpjo]; born October 26, 1949) is a former associate justice of the Supreme Court of the Philippines. He was sworn in as a member of the Supreme Court by President Gloria Macapagal Arroyo on October 26, 2001, and served until his retirement on October 26, 2019. He served as associate justice of the Supreme Court of the Philippines for a period of eighteen years. He also served as chief justice in an acting capacity several times during his tenure as Senior Associate Justice.

== Early life and education ==
Antonio Carpio was born in Davao City to Bernardo Dumlao Carpio and Sol Gonzales Tirol. He completed his elementary and secondary education at the Ateneo de Davao University. He then attended the Ateneo de Manila University, graduating with an undergraduate degree in economics in 1970. He earned his law degree from the University of the Philippines College of Law at UP Diliman, where he graduated valedictorian and cum laude in 1975. Carpio is married to Ruth Nguyen.

During his time at the University of the Philippines, Carpio served as the chairman of the editorial board for the Philippine Law Journal, editor-in-chief of The Guidon, and managing editor of the Philippine Collegian. He placed sixth in the 1975 Philippine Bar Examination with a rating of 85.70%.

== Legal and political career ==
Following his admission to the bar, Carpio entered private legal practice. In 1980, he co-founded the Carpio Villaraza Cruz law offices—frequently referred to in Philippine legal circles as "The Firm," in reference to the John Grisham novel. Alongside his private practice, he taught tax law, corporate law, and negotiable instruments law at the University of the Philippines College of Law from 1983 to 1992. He also served as a member of the university's Board of Regents from 1993 to 1998.

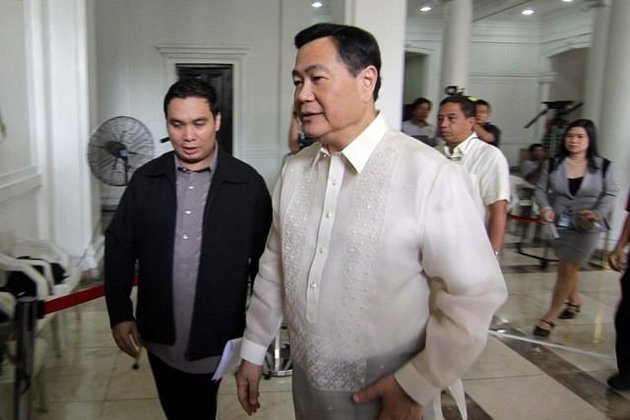
Carpio in 2013

In 1992, Carpio joined the administration of President Fidel Ramos as Chief Presidential Legal Counsel. In this capacity, he worked on regulatory reforms within the telecommunications, shipping, civil aviation, and insurance industries. Following the end of the Ramos administration, Carpio returned to private practice during the presidency of Joseph Estrada and wrote a regular opinion column for the Philippine Daily Inquirer.

== Judicial career ==
In January 2001, Carpio became the first appointee of President Gloria Macapagal Arroyo to the Supreme Court of the Philippines. Appointed at the age of 52, he was one of the youngest associate justices in the court's history.

During his 18-year tenure on the High Tribunal, Carpio chaired the court's Second Division, headed the Committee on the Revision of the Rules of Court, and served as the chair of the Senate Electoral Tribunal. He retired from the judiciary on October 26, 2019, declining a traditional en banc special retirement session, opting instead for a private retirement dinner.

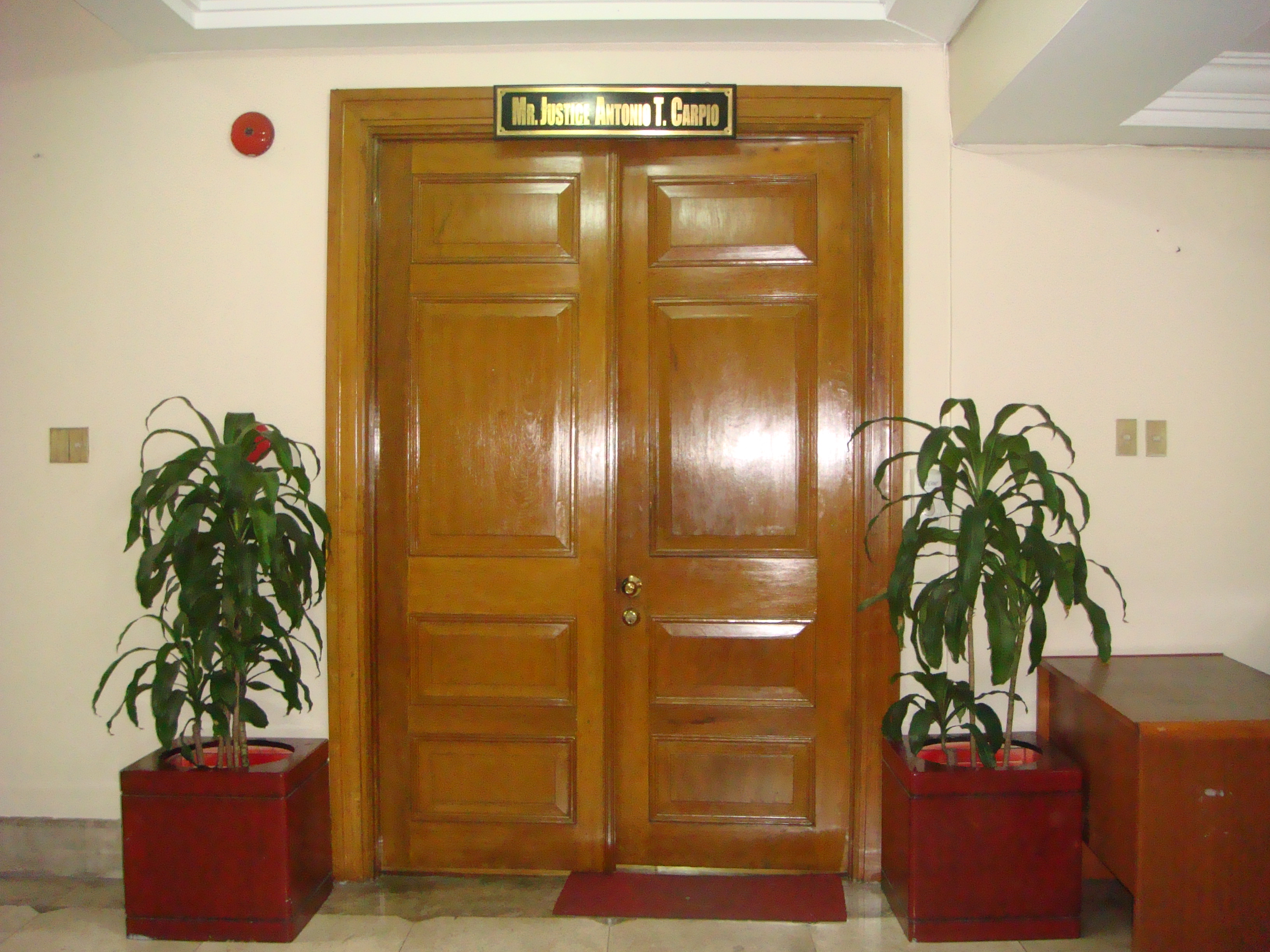
Office of Antonio T. Carpio in the Supreme Court building

=== Periods as Acting Chief Justice ===
Carpio served as the Acting Chief Justice of the Supreme Court on two major occasions. He first assumed the post on May 29, 2012, following the impeachment and removal of Renato Corona. As the most senior associate justice, contemporary commentators noted that legal tradition favored his permanent appointment to the position. However, President Benigno Aquino III ultimately selected Associate Justice Maria Lourdes Sereno. Carpio assumed the acting role a second time on March 1, 2018, after Sereno took an indefinite leave of absence during her own subsequent removal proceedings.

In total, Carpio accumulated eight months of service as acting chief justice, longer than any other senior associate justice in the court's history.

=== Chief Justice nominations ===
Throughout his tenure, Carpio was considered for the position of Chief Justice five times by the Judicial and Bar Council, but never attained the permanent post:

1. 2010: He declined the nomination to succeed Reynato Puno, citing delicadeza regarding midnight appointments made by an outgoing administration.
2. 2012: Following Corona's ouster, he was considered, but President Aquino ultimately appointed Sereno.
3. 2018 (May): Following the ouster of Sereno, Carpio declined his automatic nomination, having dissented from the decision on the grounds that the court did not possess the constitutional authority to oust its own members via quo warranto.
4. 2018 (October): Following the retirement of Teresita de Castro, Carpio accepted his nomination; however, President Rodrigo Duterte chose Associate Justice Lucas Bersamin.
5. 2019: Prior to his compulsory retirement, Carpio declined his final automatic nomination, stating he did not wish to hold the title for only a matter of days.

=== Lauro Vizconde disbarment complaint ===
In 2012, the Supreme Court dismissed a disbarment complaint filed against Carpio by Lauro Vizconde. The complaint had alleged inappropriate influence relating to judicial appointments dating back to Carpio's time as chief presidential legal counsel in 1992.

== Awards and honors ==
Carpio has received several notable accolades throughout his career:

- 1998: Presidential Medal of Merit, awarded by President Fidel Ramos for distinguished public service.
- 2015: Outstanding U.P. Alumnus in Public International Law, awarded by the University of the Philippines Alumni Association.
- 2017: Most Distinguished Alumnus, awarded by the University of the Philippines Alumni Association.
- Outstanding Achievement in Law Award, presented by the Ateneo de Manila Alumni Association.
- Honorary Doctorate of Laws, conferred by the Ateneo de Davao University.

== South China Sea dispute ==
Carpio's personal advocacy is "to protect and preserve Philippine territorial and maritime sovereignty specifically in the West Philippine Sea." referring to an area of the South China Sea claimed by the Philippines.

He believes in the importance of "an understanding by citizens of all claimant states...either to restrain extreme nationalism fueled by historical lies or to give hope to a just and durable settlement of the dispute based not only on the United Nations Convention on the Law of the Sea (UNCLOS) but also on respect for actual historical facts."

In his speech 'Grand Theft of the Global Commons', Carpio called "...the fishery Regulations of Hainan a grand theft of the global commons in the South China Sea." He also maintains that "The Philippines is fighting a legal battle not only for itself but also for all mankind. A victory for the Philippines is a victory for all States, coastal and landlocked, that China has shut out of the global commons in the South China Sea."

In 2015, the Philippine Department of Foreign Affairs sponsored Carpio on a world lecture tour on the South China Sea dispute. Carpio presented the Philippines' historical and legal case on the dispute before think tanks and universities in 30 cities covering 17 countries. According to Rigoberto Tiglao, Carpio's wife, Vietnamese Bach Yen "Ruth" Nguyen Carpio, was part of South China Sea Arbitration Philippine delegation to the Hague at its first hearing on July 7, 2015. Her name appears on page 29 of the 'Award on Jurisdiction and Admissibility'.

In May 2017, Carpio published an eBook titled "The South China Sea Dispute: Philippine Sovereign Rights and Jurisdiction in the West Philippine Sea". The book collects over 140 lectures and speeches by Carpio "intended to convince the Chinese people that the nine-dashed line has no legal or historical basis." The eBook "explains in layman's language the South China Sea dispute from A to Z."

== Notable opinions ==
- https://web.archive.org/web/20150614081333/http://sc.judiciary.gov.ph/jurisprudence/2003/jan2003/135306_carpio.htm MVRS Publications v. Islamic Da'Wah Counccriminal libel and libel as a tort (joined by J. Panganiban)
- Estrada v. Escritor — Dissenting opinion — on right of free exercise of religion as shield from administrative sanction for bigamous relations (joined by J. Panganiban, Callejo Sr., and Carpio-Morales)
- Feliciano v. COA (2004) – on legal personality of local water districts
- Tenebro v. CA (2004) – Dissenting — on whether the annulment of the second marriage affects criminal liability for bigamy (joined by J. Quisumbing, Austria-Martinez, Carpio-Morales, and Tinga)
- Central Bank Employees v. BSP (2004) – Dissenting — on claims for wage increases of government employees in accordance with equal protection clause even absent enabling legislation
- Sonza v. ABS-CBN (2004) – on employment relationship between a television presenter and the television network
- MIAA v. City of Parañaque (2006) — on exemption of government agencies in payment of local government taxes
- Rufino v. Endriga (2006) — on presidential appointing power over officials of government agencies established by Congress
- Lambino v. COMELEC (2006) — on People's Initiative as a mode to amend the Constitution
- Romulo L. Neri Vs. Senate Committee(2008) – Dissenting and Concurring Opinion, on The limits of executive privilege
- Administrative Matter No. 07-09-13-SC (2008)- Dissenting Opinion— on contempt charge versus Amado A.P. Macasaet, a newspaper columnist imputing bribery to a member of the Supreme Court
- Araullo v. Aquino (2014)- Separate Opinion — on the constitutionality of the Disbursement Acceleration Program (DAP)
- Poe-Llamanzares v. COMELEC (2016)- Dissenting Opinion — on the disqualification case of Mrs. Llamanzares to run for President of the Republic of the Philippines
- Soriano v. MTRCB - dissenting opinion

Legal offices
Preceded by Minerva Gonzaga-Reyes	Associate Justice of the Supreme Court; 2001–2019	Succeeded by Edgardo Delos Santos
Preceded by Leonardo Quisumbing	Senior Associate Justice of the Supreme Court; 2009–2019	Succeeded by Estela Perlas-Bernabe
Preceded by Renato Corona	Chief Justice of the Supreme Court; Acting; 2012, 2018 May, 2018 October, 2019	Succeeded by Maria Lourdes Sereno de facto
Preceded by Maria Lourdes Sereno de facto	Chief Justice of the Supreme Court; Acting; 2018 May	Vacant Title next held by Teresita De Castro
Vacant Title last held by Himself	Chief Justice of the Supreme Court; Acting; 2018 October	Vacant Title next held by Lucas Bersamin
Preceded by Lucas Bersamin	Chief Justice of the Supreme Court; Acting; 2019	Vacant Title next held by Diosdado Peralta
