= Quo warranto petition against Maria Lourdes Sereno =

2018 petition in the Supreme Court of the Philippines

Republic of the Philippines v. Maria Lourdes Sereno
- Court: Supreme Court of the Philippines en banc

Full case name
- Republic of the Philippines, represented by Solicitor General Jose C. Calida v. Maria Lourdes P. A. Sereno
- Decided: May 11, 2018
- Citation: 831 Phil. 271

Case history
- Prior action(s): None; for quo warranto petitions the Supreme Court is always the court of first instance
- Subsequent action(s): Motion for reconsideration filed on May 31, 2018; denied with finality on June 19, 2018; Administrative case re: show cause order in G.R. No. 237428 (A.M. No. 18-06-01-SC)
- Related action(s): Impeachment proceedings in the House of Representatives

Questions presented
- Does the court have jurisdiction, or should the Congress decide via impeachment? Are quo warranto petitions time limited when brought by the Republic? Assuming jurisdiction and that the prescriptive period is immaterial, was Sereno's appointment ever valid? Is lack of integrity a ground on which quo warranto petitions should prevail?

Ruling
- Ponente: Justice Noel Tijam
- On original case: Petition of quo warranto granted, Sereno declared guilty of unlawfully holding and exercising the powers of the office of Chief Justice ab initio. Sereno ordered to show cause for violating the sub judice ethical conduct rule within ten days or else face an administrative case. On motion to reconsider: Denied. On administrative case: Found guilty of violating Canons 11 and 13 in the Code of Professional Responsibility, and Canons 1–4 in the New Code of Judicial Conduct for the Philippine Judiciary. "Sternly" reprimanded in lieu of suspension from the Integrated Bar of the Philippines or disbarment therefrom.

Court membership
- Judges sitting: Maria Lourdes Sereno (recused), Antonio Carpio, Presbitero Velasco Jr., Teresita Leonardo-De Castro, Diosdado Peralta, Lucas Bersamin, Mariano del Castillo, Estela Perlas Bernabe, Marvic Leonen, Francis Jardeleza, Alfredo Benjamin Caguioa, Samuel Martires, Noel Tijam, Andres Reyes Jr., Alexander Gesmundo
- Concurrence: Justices de Castro, Peralta, Bersamin, Jardeleza, Martires, Reyes, and Gesmundo
- Concur/dissent: Justices Velasco Jr., del Castillo
- Dissent: Justices Carpio, Bernabe, Leonen, Caguioa

The quo warranto petition against Maria Lourdes Sereno, filed before the Supreme Court of the Philippines, led to the landmark case Republic v. Sereno, (Note: Sometimes also titled Republic of the Philippines v. Maria Lourdes Sereno.) 831 Phil. 271 (2018), which nullified Maria Lourdes Sereno's appointment as Chief Justice of the Supreme Court of the Philippines, finding that she never lawfully held the office due to a lack of integrity for failing to file certain required financial documents. As a result, she was ousted from the Supreme Court as Chief Justice. The Court handed down its ruling on May 11, 2018. The case began with a filing before the House of Representatives of an impeachment demand, the accusations in which Solicitor General Jose Calida used as the factual basis for his quo warranto petition.

Sereno had faced criticism from the administration of President Rodrigo Duterte for expressing her criticism of his Philippine drug war, and many saw the petition as politically motivated. As mentioned, Sereno had also faced an impeachment trial prior to the granting of the petition, but after its granting, such trial became moot and was never scheduled. The ruling of the Supreme Court was received favorably by the Duterte administration as well as its political allies, while critics of the petition viewed Sereno's removal from office as an attack on due process and on the judicial independence of the Supreme Court.

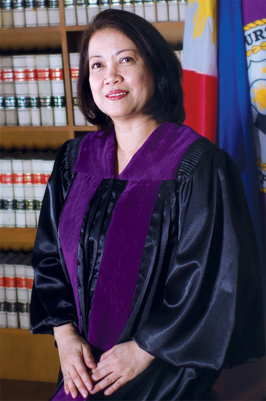
As a result of Republic v. Sereno, Maria Lourdes Sereno, above, was ousted from her position. She was no longer considered the 24th Chief Justice of the Philippines, as the Court ruled that her appointment was never legal.

== Background ==
=== Concurrent impeachment process ===
During Maria Lourdes Sereno's de facto tenure as Chief Justice during the administration of President Rodrigo Duterte, Sereno faced possible impeachment. An impeachment process against Sereno began on August 30, 2017, when 25 lawmakers sponsored a petition against her filed by Larry Gadon, former lawyer to President Macapagal-Arroyo.

The main argument for her impeachment was that Sereno allegedly failed to declare her statement of assets, liabilities and net worth (SALN) in full during her 17-year teaching period at the University of the Philippines College of Law (UPCL). She was also accused of tax misdeclarations and unauthorized expenses. The University of the Philippines (UP) and the Office of the Ombudsman could only produce Sereno's SALNs from the years 1998, 2002, and 2006.

On March 8, the House of Representatives Committee on Justice found probable cause to impeach Sereno due to "allegations that Sereno committed culpable violation of the Constitution, betrayal of public trust, corruption, and other high crimes" by a vote of 38–2, after which it was to go to a plenary vote. On April 11, then-Speaker Pantaleon Alvarez announced that the earliest the impeachment would be was May 14, due both to procedure and the Lent break. He noted, though, that a verdict adverse to Sereno on the quo warranto petition would render the impeachment proceedings moot.

=== Quo warranto petitions ===
A quo warranto petition was, before the appointment of Jose Calida as Solicitor General, a very seldom used Philippine extraordinary writ. Its name derives from the Latin question quo warranto, which means "by what authority?" (Note: Sometimes rendered as "by whose authority?", although quo literally means "where" or "why".) In its early days, during the American colonial period, quo warranto was mostly used to challenge a democratic election, that is, to make the claim that the person who is holding an office is a usurper, and that someone else deserves the office, e.g., due to electoral fraud or ineligibility. Indeed, this is the only way the term is used in law professor Ernesto C. Salao's (Note: As of January 2018, associate dean of the Polytechnic University of the Philippines College of Law.) widely cited 858-page book The 1987 Constitution of the Republic of the Philippines (2001 ed.).

In the Philippines, though, the process has evolved, in a way that many, including former Solicitor General Florin Hilbay, find unconstitutional. It has come to be understood that it can be used in extraordinary cases to unseat judicial appointees, and impeachable officials, not only to challenge elections. Some, such as Ranhilio Aquino, (Note: As of 2011, dean of the San Beda University College of Law. See Rex G. Rico (November 24, 2011). "Value of a non-lawyer's opinion on purely legal issues". Philippine Daily Inquirer.) argue this due to the fact that the President and Vice President were explicitly enumerated as vulnerable to quo warranto by the Supreme Court sitting as the Presidential Election Tribunal, and, unlike many other constitutions, Article 11 of the 1987 Constitution does not exclusively grant the power of impeachment to Congress.

Quo warranto petitions, when successful, do not "remove" someone from office—they declare the very appointment itself null and void ab initio, meaning that the office was never legally held as it has been declared to have been assumed under false pretenses.

== Timeline ==
=== Filing ===
After an impeachment process against Sereno began, a quo warranto petition seeking to void Sereno's appointment as Chief Justice was filed on March 5, 2018, by Solicitor General Jose Calida with the reason of her alleged lack of integrity. The traditional one year limitation on quo warranto actions, part of the Rules of Court, was immediately raised by Sereno and those in the media. Calida simply invoked the legal principle of nullum tempus occurrit regi—time runs against no king. (Note: The Philippines has not had a monarch since Spanish rule, but as in England, this ancient legal principle is understood there to refer to actions taken by the government in the name of the Republic for the public good.)

Calida justified the filing by saying that her "peers" (Note: In the Philippines, the chief justice is primus inter pares, officially equal to the other justices.) know both her, and the Constitution, best, so are better placed to decide than Congress would be. Calida, who also said that former Chief Justice Renato Corona was "unjustly" impeached, told Sereno that he was being "kind" to her by saving her from the "indignity" of an impeachment trial. Sereno challenged the petition, insisting that the only legal way to remove her from her post was via impeachment. One hundred forty Filipino law professors, including the deans of major schools like the UPCL and the Lyceum of the Philippines University College of Law, called for the impeachment trial to be the deciding factor and not the quo warranto petition.

The petition claims that despite having been employed at the University of the Philippines College of Law (UPCL) from November 1986 to June 1, 2006, Sereno's SALN records at the UPD Human Resource Development Office only includes the years 1985, 1990, 1991, 1993–1997, and 2002, while her SALN records at the Office of the Ombudsman only include those from the years 1999–2009.

=== Sereno takes leave ===
Following the impeachment process filed against her, Sereno took an indefinite leave on March 1, 2018, but said she would not resign. Senior Associate Justice Antonio Carpio served as Acting Chief Justice, a post which he also previously served in during the transition between Corona's impeachment and the appointment of Sereno. She ended her leave on May 9, 2018. Sereno's spokesperson and lawyer Jojo Lacanilao denied in an ANC interview that Sereno was forced to go on leave. Oriental Mindoro Representative Rey Umali, however, urged Sereno to resign.

Duterte, annoyed at the portrayal of the petition and questions about his possible involvement in it, declared himself Sereno's "enemy" on April 9. Duterte also criticized the slow speed of the impeachment process in Congress, citing it as the reason for his administration's quo warranto petition. (Note: Duterte: Now this time, I'm asking the congressmen and the Speaker: Do it now. Wag ninyong dramahin. [Cut it out with the drama.] Or else, I will do it for you. Ngayon makialam talaga ako. [Now I'm getting involved.] I am asking Congress, what's taking you too long? [...] I will not hesitate to do what is to the best interest of my country. If it calls for your [Sereno's] forced removal, I will do it.)

=== Oral argument ===
Oral argument in Republic v. Sereno
For almost six hours, Solicitor General Jose Calida, arguing for the government, and Maria Lourdes Sereno, presenting her own defense pro se (in conjunction with her attorneys), participated in an oral argument before the Supreme Court of the Philippines.

Oral argument took place in the case on April 10, 2018. As it was held in April, it took place in Baguio, as the Court traditionally meets there every April. The trial went on for almost six hours, and did not end until past 7 pm. Jose Calida personally represented the Office of the Solicitor General, while in a highly unusual move, Sereno represented herself, appearing pro se.

=== Ruling ===
Deciding on the quo warranto petition en banc, the Supreme Court justices voted to nullify Sereno's appointment on May 11, 2018, by a vote of 8–6, making Sereno the first constitutional officer in the Philippines to be ousted from office without an impeachment trial.

==== Majority opinion ====
The majority opinion was written by Justice Noel Tijam. The Court invoked the doctrine of the "transcendental" importance of judicial review, ruling that the quo warranto petition was a valid exercise of the Court's power, there was an actual controversy, and the Republic had standing. The Court ruled that quo warranto cases and impeachment proceedings can proceed independently and simultaneously due to the fact that they are based on different causes of action; quo warranto questions the eligibility and valid exercise of a position; whereas, impeachment is removal for committing crimes specified by the Constitution. Furthermore, it ruled that if it wished, Congress may have continued to impeachment without prejudice from the Court on the principle of the separation of powers. Tijam wrote that "to [require Congress to] momentarily abandon their legislative duties to focus on impeachment proceedings [against] a public official, who at the outset, may clearly be unqualified [would be a] waste of time."

The Court ruled that impeachment is not the exclusive legal remedy by which the legitimacy of exercise of power may be challenged. The Court ruled that so severe was Sereno's failure to declare her assets that she has no integrity. As integrity is an enumerated requirement of Article VIII of the Constitution, she was therefore, by the Court's logic, never eligible once it was destroyed at the time of her not filing her SALNs.

==== Dissenting opinions ====
Senior Associate Justice Antonio Carpio voted against the quo warranto petition, but nevertheless wrote in his dissenting opinion that her "repeated non-filing of SALNs" constitutes "a culpable violation of the Constitution and betrayal of public trust, which are grounds for impeachment under the Constitution".

Associate Justice Marvic Leonen, in his dissenting opinion, called the petition "a legal abomination" that should have been dismissed. He expressed disfavor in removing an impeachable official through a quo warranto petition, writing: "We render this Court subservient to an aggressive Solicitor General. We render those who present dissenting opinions unnecessarily vulnerable to powerful interests."

In his dissent, Associate Justice Alfredo Benjamin Caguioa, wrote that the majority had allowed the executive to take a "[less traveled] prohibited road". In Caguioa's view, the inability of the Court to resolve matters within its own walls is a disservice to the institution and its individual members. He colorfully opined that the Court had committed a suicide as gruesome as any seppuku, but with none of the honor typically associated with it in Japanese culture.

=== Motion for reconsideration ===
Sereno was given the right to file a motion for reconsideration against the Supreme Court's decision to nullify her appointment as Chief Justice, which she did, on May 31, 2018.

The Supreme Court denied with finality Sereno's motion for reconsideration for "lack of merit" on June 19, 2018, in an 8–6 decision, with no justices changing their vote.

=== Administrative case ===
In its original ruling, the Court demanded Sereno submit a brief defending herself against alleged violations of the ethical code Philippine attorneys agree to, which is set by the Supreme Court.

On July 17, 2018, the Court ruled that she had breached the sub judice rule (Note: For the text of the rule, see: Adopting the New Code of Judicial Conduct for the Philippine Judiciary, A.M. No. 03-05-01-SC, Canon 3 (Supreme Court of the Philippines).) when she spoke to the media and gave speeches about cases which were not yet decided, including her own case, while still sitting as Chief Justice, which it reprimanded her for, in lieu of disbarment or suspension from the Integrated Bar of the Philippines.

== Reactions ==
=== In the Philippines ===
The petitioner, Solicitor General Jose Calida, stated: "The Supreme Court decision ousting Maria Lourdes Sereno augurs well for the country, as it preserves the stability and integrity of the Judiciary. This decision is the epitome of its exercise of judicial independence."

Senator Antonio Trillanes said that the Supreme Court majority had committed a "heinous crime against our justice system" which had "killed the Constitution". Senators Sonny Angara, Bam Aquino and Francis Pangilinan joined him in condemning the ruling.

=== International ===
The New York-based Human Rights Watch called the decision "unprecedented and nefarious," adding that "Sereno’s ouster also kicks open the door for wanton removals of members of other constitutional bodies, such as the Commission on Human Rights. [...] Ultimately, the rejection of constitutional checks and balances concentrates power in the hands of Duterte and his allies, posing the greatest danger to democracy in the Philippines since the Marcos dictatorship."

== Aftermath ==
=== Effect on the Court ===
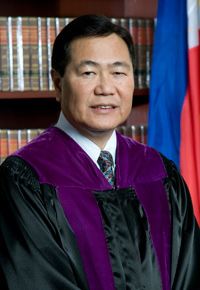
Senior Associate Justice Antonio Carpio became acting Chief Justice following Sereno's ouster.

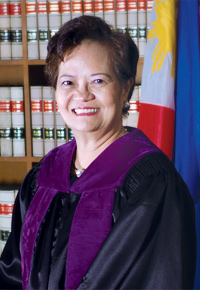
Justice Teresita De Castro was formally appointed to replace Sereno as the Chief Justice on August 25, 2018.

With the ouster of Maria Lourdes Sereno from her post as Chief Justice of the Supreme Court of the Philippines, she altogether leaves the Court. When she was appointed Chief Justice, she vacated her position as Associate Justice, and therefore, cannot assume her former position again. Sereno, who was during her tenure called the 24th Chief Justice, is now referred to as a former Chief Justice de facto, but not de jure. This is because a quo warranto petition cannot remove someone from office: if a quo warranto petition succeeds, the target's very appointment is declared null and void ab initio, meaning, legally, she was never Chief Justice at all, as her appointment has been declared illegitimate.

Opposition lawmakers of the Congress filed an impeachment complaint on August 23, 2018, against 7 Associate Justices who voted for the quo warranto petition based on the grounds of culpable violation of the Constitution and betrayal of public trust.

Justice Antonio Carpio, the most senior Associate Justice at the time, assumed the post of Chief Justice in an acting capacity starting May 14, 2018, following Sereno's ouster.

On August 25, Teresita de Castro, who only had two months left to serve in office, was appointed by president Rodrigo Duterte as the new Chief Justice after being included on a list of candidates by the Judicial and Bar Council a day prior. Her role as one of the five sitting justices who sought to nullify the appointment of Sereno as Chief Justice was also seen as a reason for the appointment. The appointment was criticized as, due to her age, she was obligated to retire on October 10, 2018—as she did, after only 44 days as the 24th Chief Justice. Justice Lucas Bersamin took her place on November 28.

=== Effect on the law ===
As a landmark case, Republic v. Sereno established a new avenue for decisive, rapid action by the Supreme Court before lower courts had weighed in, expanding the Supreme Court's mandate and making it in more cases simultaneously a court of first instance and a court of last resort. When ABS-CBN's franchise expired, rather than allowing the National Telecommunications Commission to grant them a temporary franchise, Calida once again filed a quo warranto petition, asking the Court, in effect, "by what authority does ABS-CBN operate?" As a result of Republic v. Sereno, therefore, the ancient legal concept of quo warranto has taken on novel meaning in Philippine courts.

== See also ==
- Impeachment of Renato Corona
