= Maria Lourdes Sereno =

Chief Justice of the Philippines from 2012 to 2018

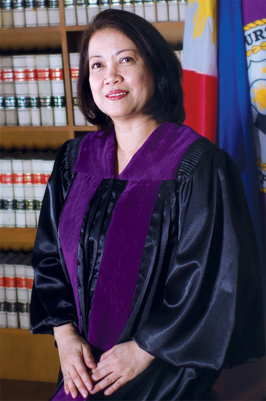
- Official portrait, 2013

Chief Justice of the Supreme Court of the Philippines
- De facto
- In office August 25, 2012 – May 11, 2018 (Note: Maria Lourdes Sereno was removed on May 11, 2018, via quo warranto by a special en banc session which also ruled that the Chief Justice post vacant; the petition alleged Sereno's appointment was void ab initio due to her failure in complying with the Judicial and Bar Council requirements. Hence, her tenure is now considered de facto.); On leave from March 1 – May 9, 2018 (Note: Duties and powers transferred to Antonio Carpio while on leave.)
- Appointed by: Benigno Aquino III
- Preceded by: Renato Corona
- Succeeded by: Teresita de Castro

169th Associate Justice of the Supreme Court of the Philippines
- In office August 13, 2010 – August 25, 2012
- Appointed by: Benigno Aquino III
- Preceded by: Renato Corona
- Succeeded by: Marvic Leonen

Personal details
- Born: Maria Lourdes Punzalan Aranal; July 2, 1960 (age 66) Manila, Philippines
- Education: Ateneo de Manila University (BA); University of the Philippines Diliman (LLB, MA); University of Michigan (LLM)

Maria Lourdes "Meilou" Aranal Sereno (Tagalog: [sɛˈrɛnɔ]; born Maria Lourdes Punzalan Aranal; July 2, 1960) is a Filipina lawyer and judge who served as de facto chief justice of the Supreme Court of the Philippines from 2012 until 2018.

Appointed as an associate justice by President Benigno Aquino III in August 2010, she became the second youngest person (at the age of 52) to assume the post of chief justice in August 2012. She is considered to be the first woman head of a judicial branch in any Southeast Asian sovereign state.

She was removed from office by way of an 8–6 decision by the Supreme Court over a quo warranto petition, rendering her appointment as chief justice null and void. Sereno had faced criticism from the administration of President Rodrigo Duterte for expressing her criticism of his Philippine drug war, and some saw the petition as politically motivated. Nevertheless, the quo warranto petition was based on Sereno's blatant failure to file her SALN 11 times during her stint as a law school professor in UP, which questioned her probity and integrity required as chief justice. In the same way, the court also found that upon nomination for the post of Chief Justice, Sereno failed to file her SALN to the Judicial and Bar Council. At the same time she was removed from office, Sereno had also been facing an impeachment trial prior to the granting of the petition, but after its granting, such trial became moot and was never scheduled.

== Early life and education ==
Sereno was born on July 2, 1960, in Manila, to Margarito Aranal of Siasi, Sulu, and Soledad Punzalan of Bay, Laguna who served as a public school teacher.

Sereno graduated salutatorian from Kamuning Elementary School in 1972 and with honors from Quezon City High School in 1976.

A scholarship allowed her to apply at the Ateneo de Manila University where she had the options of taking either Political Science or Economics. She opted for the Bachelor of Arts in Economics and graduated in 1980. She finished her Bachelor of Laws degree from the College of Law at the University of the Philippines Diliman in 1984, graduating as cum laude and class valedictorian, and took the bar exam that year. She was admitted to the practice of law the following year.

She earned a Master of Arts in economics in 1992 from the University of the Philippines School of Economics of UP Diliman. Thereafter, she earned a Master of Laws from the University of Michigan Law School in 1993.

She is an alumna of the UP Portia Sorority.

== Career ==
=== Pre-Supreme Court career ===
Sereno started her career as a junior associate of the Sycip Salazar Feliciano and Hernandez law firm.

At the age of 38, she was appointed as legal counselor at the World Trade Organization's Appellate Body Secretariat in Geneva.

She was the only female member of the 1999 Preparatory Commission on Constitutional Reform where she headed the commission’s Steering Committee. In the same year, with Justice Jose Campos, Commissioner Haydee Yorac, and other professors from the UP College of Law, she co-founded Accesslaw, a corporation that provided the first annotated electronic research system in Philippine law.

She also served as legal counsel for various government offices including the Office of the President, Office of the Solicitor General, Manila International Airport Authority, and the Department of Trade and Industry. She previously headed the Information and Public Division office of the UP Law Complex. She was also a lecturer at the Hague Academy of International Law.

At the time of her appointment to the Supreme Court in 2010, Sereno was executive director of the Asian Institute of Management Policy Center. She was also the president of Accesslaw Inc., had taught at University of the Philippines College of Law for 19 years, and served as a consultant for the United Nations, World Bank, and US Agency for International Development.

Sereno served as a co-counsel with Justice Florentino Feliciano on the Fraport case in Singapore, in which the Republic of the Philippines won the case.

=== Supreme Court of the Philippines ===
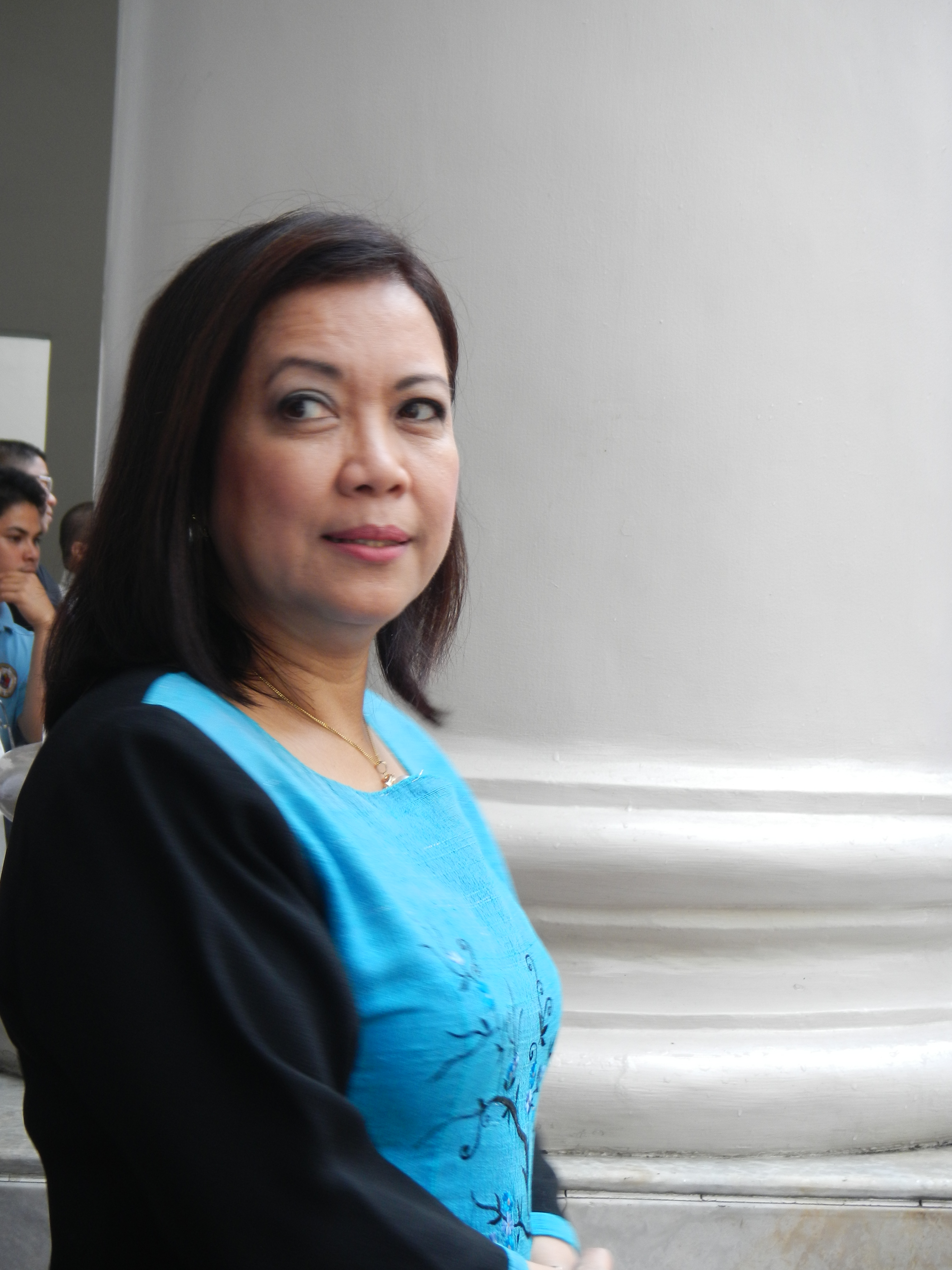
Sereno at Andres Narvasa's funeral in 2013

==== Associate Justice (2010–2012) ====
In August 2010, Sereno was appointed associate justice of the Supreme Court of the Philippines, its 169th member and the first appointee to the high court by President Benigno Aquino III. Sereno, the 13th woman appointed as justice of the Supreme Court, was the youngest appointee to the court since Manuel Moran in 1945 until Marvic Leonen surpassed her at the age of 49 in 2012.

==== Chief Justice (2012–2018) ====
On August 24, 2012, President Aquino announced his appointment of Sereno as the new chief justice of the Supreme Court, replacing Renato Corona, who was removed from office in May 2012 after being convicted in an impeachment trial.

Sereno voted against several of President Rodrigo Duterte's proposals, such as declaring martial law and burying Ferdinand Marcos in a cemetery reserved for national heroes. Sereno also took a stance on Duterte's Philippine drug war when she called for due process for those included in Duterte's "drug list", a list of people alleged to be involved in the illegal drug trade.

In a televised public speech in April 2018, Duterte addressed Sereno thus: "So I’m putting you on notice that I am now your enemy. And you have to be out of the Supreme Court," after Sereno accused him of interfering with the case.

===== Removal from office =====
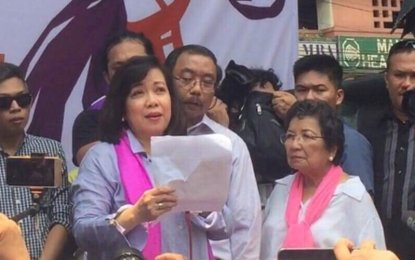
Sereno addressing supporters after a decision was made on the quo warranto petition filed against her on May 11, 2018.

On August 30, 2017, at least 25 members of the House of Representatives began the impeachment process against then-chief justice Sereno. In addition Solicitor General Jose Calida filed a quo warranto petition to invalidate her appointment as chief justice over alleged lack of integrity. Both the impeachment proceedings and quo warranto petition cites Sereno's alleged failure to properly declare her Statement of Assets, Liabilities and Net worth (SALN) and was also responsible for tax misdeclarations and unauthorized expenses. Sereno has questioned the quo warranto petition saying that she could only be legally removed through impeachment.

After an impeachment process against her began, Sereno took an indefinite leave on March 1, 2018, but maintained she will not resign. She returned from leave shortly after the rest of the Supreme Court made a decision on the quo warranto petition. Deciding on the quo warranto petition en banc the Supreme Court justices voted to remove Sereno from the court on May 11, 2018, by a vote of 8–6.

Sereno filed a motion for consideration but the high court denied with finality Sereno's motion for reconsideration for lack of merit on June 19, 2018, voting 8–6, upholding the quo warranto decision. The ruling also states that no further pleading will be entertained as well as order for immediate entry of judgement. Various members of the opposition, notably Vice President Leni Robredo, senator Risa Hontiveros, senator Antonio Trillanes, and Akbayan partylist representative Gio Tingson, condemned the ouster of Sereno.

Senior Justice Antonio Carpio assumed the post of chief justice in an acting capacity starting May 14, 2018, following Sereno's removal from office. As a result of Republic v. Sereno, Maria Lourdes Sereno is no longer considered the 24th chief justice of the Philippines, as the court ruled that her appointment was never legal but null and void ab initio. Thus, on August 25, 2018, Teresita de Castro was appointed by President Rodrigo Duterte as the new and de jure 24th (successor of Renato Corona) and first female chief justice of the Supreme Court of the Philippines.

===== Tax cases =====
The Court of Tax Appeals in a 45-page Decision dated May 14, 2024, penned by the 2-member Court of Tax Appeals Special Second Division, Justices Lanee Cui-David and Jean Marie Bacorro-Villena, granted Serenos' Petition for review. The tax Court voided the Bureau of Internal Revenue ’s P8.8 million tax assessment (2011 to 2016).

== Post-removal activities ==
Following her removal, Sereno continued to be active in public policy and advocacy. She currently serves as the Chairperson of the Legal Advisory and Public Policy Review Commission of the Philippine Council of Evangelical Churches, where she focuses on legal and policy issues affecting the Filipino community.

Sereno is part of the National Coalition for the Family and the Constitution, an organization which has launched the Project Dalisay initiative.

Sereno has been a prominent critic of Senate Bill 1979, also known as the Prevention of Adolescent Pregnancy Bill. She emphasized the importance of basing legislative decisions on facts, particularly when addressing issues affecting vulnerable sectors of society. In a statement, she said:

"Wala po akong reklamo kung may mga iba't ibang stakeholder organizations na puposisyon para o kontra sa isang panukalang batas namin dito. Pero kailangan on the basis of facts, lalo na po pag ganitong klaseng panukalang batas ang pinag-uusapan, na gustong isulong ang child protection para sa isang especially vulnerable na sektor sa ating lipunan."

Sereno also highlighted alternative approaches to reducing teenage pregnancy, citing Singapore's model under its Ministry of Education. She explained:

"Mayroon po bang alternative? Kasi lahat tayo gusto natin bawasan ang teenage pregnancy. Meron po, sa Singapore po, under the Ministry of Education, ang sexuality education nila ay ginawa nilang parang transcendent ang vision ng kabataan. Ibig sabihin, ang bata, tinuruan nilang mangarap ng malayo para ma-achieve ang kanilang mga aspirations sa buhay. And then they are teaching self-control. Ibig sabihin, sinasabi nila, magandang pag-isipan ang plano nyo, mag-restrain kayo and in fact, abstinence is a good standard for Singaporean youth."

Sereno has expressed concerns about international programs promoted by organizations such as UNESCO, UNFPA, and UNICEF, which she believes could hypersexualize children at an early age. She stated:

"It’s an international program being promoted primarily by the UNESCO (United Nations Educational, Scientific and Cultural Organization), the UNFPA (United Nations Population Fund), and the UNICEF (United Nations Children’s Fund) that will hypersexualize children at a very early age."

== Personal life ==
Maria Lourdes Sereno is married to Mario Jose E. Sereno of Davao City. They have two children, Maria Sophia and Jose Lorenzo.

== Awards ==
- Awardee for Law, The Outstanding Women in the Nation's Service (TOWNS), 1998

== Notes ==
Legal offices
Preceded by Renato Corona de jure – impeached	Associate Justice of the Supreme Court; 2010–2012	Succeeded by Marvic Leonen
Preceded by Renato Corona de jure – impeached	Chief Justice of the Supreme Court de facto – appointment null and void ab initio 2012–2018	Succeeded by Teresita Leonardo-de Castro de jure
