= Teresita de Castro =

Filipino judge (born 1948)

The Honorable Teresita de Castro
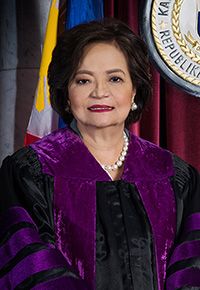
- Official portrait, 2018

24th Chief Justice of the Supreme Court of the Philippines
- In office August 28, 2018 – October 10, 2018
- Appointed by: Rodrigo Duterte
- Preceded by: Maria Lourdes Sereno (De facto); Renato Corona (De jure)
- Succeeded by: Lucas Bersamin

160th Associate Justice of the Supreme Court of the Philippines
- In office December 3, 2007 – August 28, 2018
- Appointed by: Gloria Macapagal Arroyo
- Preceded by: Cancio Garcia
- Succeeded by: Rosmari Carandang

4th Presiding Justice of the Sandiganbayan
- In office September 8, 1997 – December 3, 2007
- Appointed by: Fidel V. Ramos
- Preceded by: Romulo Quimbo
- Succeeded by: Ediberto Sandoval (acting)

Personal details
- Born: Teresita Jose Leonardo; October 10, 1948 (age 77) Manila, Philippines
- Spouse: Eduardo de Castro
- Children: 3
- Education: University of the Philippines Diliman (BA, LL.B)

Teresita Leonardo de Castro (born Teresita Jose Leonardo; October 10, 1948) is a Filipina who served as the 24th chief justice of the Supreme Court of the Philippines; she was appointed by President Rodrigo Duterte on August 28, 2018. She assumed the vacated position once her predecessor, Maria Lourdes Sereno, was removed via a quo warranto petition (by declaring Sereno a de facto chief justice and making her 2012 appointment null and void ab initio); making De Castro the de jure 24th chief justice, and the first female chief justice of the Supreme Court.

De Castro officially retired on October 10, 2018, after reaching the mandatory retirement age of 70; merely 46 days after serving as Chief Justice, surpassing the record of former Chief Justice Pedro Yap of being the shortest-tenured Chief Justice.

Prior to her appointment to the Supreme Court by President Gloria Macapagal Arroyo, she had been the Presiding Justice of the Sandiganbayan.

She held the position of President-elect of the International Association of Women Judges (IAWJ) from 2012 to 2014. She is also the Chairwoman of the 2015 Philippine Bar Examination committee.

== Early life and education ==
De Castro's parents are Fortunato R. Leonardo and Maxima Jose of Parañaque. De Castro resides at Merville Subdivision, Parañaque. She is married to businessman Eduardo A. De Castro and they have three children: Maria Cherell, Christine Genevive, and Edouard Anthony. Her half-brother, Eduardo L. Leonardo works as executive assistant VI in Sandiganbayan.

De Castro finished her grade school (1960) and high school education (valedictorian, 1964) at St. Paul College of Parañaque, and earned her political science degree (cum laude, 1968) and Bachelor of Laws (1972) at the University of the Philippines Diliman. She passed the Philippine Bar Examination of November, 1972 with bar rating of 80.9%.

== Early legal career ==
She started her judicial career as a law clerk, legal and judicial assistant in the Supreme Court of the Philippines,(1973–1978). She was appointed DOJ State Counsel I and II (1978–1985), and promoted to senior state counsel (1985–1987), supervising state counsel, and chief of the Legal Staff (1988–1989). Before her Sandiganbayan appointment, De Castro was State Counsel V and Legal Staff head at the DOJ (1989–1995).

== Sandiganbayan ==
=== Trial of Joseph Estrada ===
De Castro headed the anti-graft court's special division on the perjury and plunder trial of former President Joseph Estrada. Estrada's son, Senator Jinggoy Estrada also faced charges. The trial finished in September 2007. Estrada was acquitted of perjury charges but found guilty of plunder and sentenced to life imprisonment. All the co-defendants, including Senator Jinggoy Estrada, were acquitted of all charges.

Estrada appealed the decision and called the court (and De Castro, as head of it) "a kangaroo court", while President Gloria Macapagal Arroyo said the court's decision must be accepted.

De Castro was appointed to the Supreme Court soon after the end of the highly politicized trial. This led to some accusations of quid pro quo. People claimed that she had convicted former President Estrada in exchange for a seat on the Supreme Court. She vigorously denied those rumors, claiming that she had been a candidate for a seat on the high court before her involvement in the case.

== Associate Justice ==
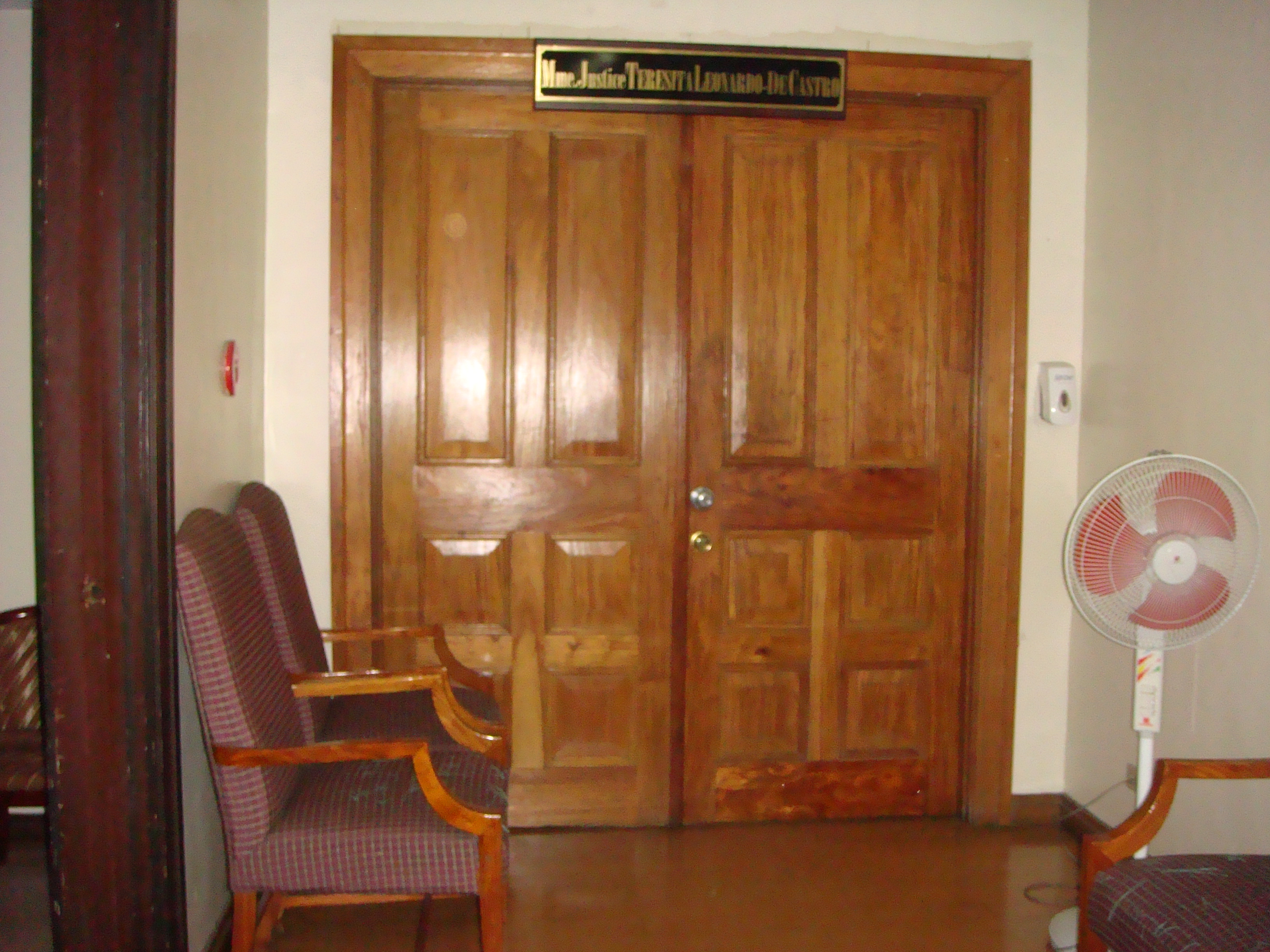
Chambers of Teresita Leonardo-De Castro (new Supreme Court of the Philippines building)

On October 16, 2007, the Judicial and Bar Council (JBC) announced the final nominees to the Associate Justice Cancio Garcia's vacant seat. Teresita De Castro, Justices Edgardo Cruz and Martin Villarama, got seven out of eight votes, while Associate Justices Francisco Villaruz and Edilberto G. Sandoval and Labor Secretary Arturo D. Brion got five votes each (from the JBC). Under Philippine law, the president has 90 days to choose from among the final nominees.

Senator Jinggoy Estrada (son of Joseph), vowed to block the appointment to the Supreme Court of Sandiganbayan Justices Teresita de Castro and Francisco Villaruz, Jr. (who convicted his father – President Joseph Estrada). Jinggoy argued that: "Such a promotion would seem like a reward in exchange for the guilty verdict against the deposed President. We are convinced, then and now, that the special court created to exclusively try the case of President Estrada was established precisely to convict him, which is what exactly happened."

De Castro was sworn by Chief Justice Reynato S. Puno on December 4, 2007. Teresita de Castro stated: "Everything happens in God's time. I believe that my 34 years of service in the judiciary and a good track record make me qualified for this position." Immediately after being sworn in, she participated in her first en banc session.

De Castro became controversial when she was the Sandiganbayan's Presiding Justice after her division convicted former President Joseph Estrada for graft. Many believed that her decision was related to her subsequent appointment by former President Gloria Macapagal Arroyo as the 160th Associate Justice of the Supreme Court in 2007 in exchange of her favorable decision.

=== Reactions to her appointment to the Supreme Court ===
- Joseph Estrada called the appointment of Teresita de Castro as a "reward for an unjust conviction [of him]".
- Minority Leader Aquilino Pimentel, Jr. said: "That is the President's call and I do not question it. Of course, other persons may have personal reasons for objecting to the appointment of Justice De Castro. But you cannot please everyone."
- On December 4, 2007, Senate President Manuel Villar and Senate President Pro-Tempore Jinggoy Estrada (the son of Joseph) questioned the timing of de Castro's appointment. Villar stated that: "The appointment coming so soon after de Castro's Division had convicted former President Joseph Estrada is bad timing. It gives the impression that it was her reward for convicting Erap [Estrada's nickname]." Jinggoy Estrada said: "A few months after the conviction of President Estrada, she [de Castro] was immediately appointed to the Supreme Court. I think there was a deal between Malacañang and Sandiganbayan that if she convicts Estrada, she would be appointed to the Supreme Court. That gave political color to the decision of Sandiganbayan. I think she is qualified to be an associate justice. It's just that the timing is wrong. If I were Justice de Castro, I would have refused the appointment out of delicadeza [good taste]. It did not look good in the eyes of the public."
- Sen. Richard Gordon stated that "de Castro is highly qualified for the High Tribunal and that her appointment could not be interpreted as "reward" for her decision on the Erap plunder case. Malacañang had ignored the Sandiganbayan's guilty verdict and granted absolute pardon to the former president."
- Executive Secretary Eduardo Ermita defended the appointment of Teresita de Castro noting that she was nominated several times to the post but because she was still handling the Estrada case she was bypassed twice. He added that de Castro deserved the appointment.

=== Testimony against Sereno ===
De Castro was one of five sitting justices who sought to nullify the appointment of Maria Lourdes Sereno as the country's top magistrate. De Castro and Sereno were both shortlisted by the Judicial and Bar Council in 2012 for the Chief Justiceship but then-President Benigno Aquino III appointed the latter to the post. Along with four other members, she was accused of exhausting legal remedies to oust the incumbent Chief Justice.

== Chief Justice ==
On August 25, 2018, De Castro was appointed by President Rodrigo Duterte as the Chief Justice of the Supreme Court, following the ouster of Maria Lourdes Sereno via quo warranto. She served 46 days until her mandatory retirement on her 70th birthday on 10 October. De Castro's appointment was criticized due to her expected short term of two months since she is obligated to retire on October 8, 2018, as well as her role as one of the five sitting justices who sought to nullify the appointment of Sereno as Chief Justice.

The Movement Against Tyranny (MAT) called De Castro a disciple of President Rodrigo Duterte due to what MAT saw as her record of deciding in favor of Duterte.

=== Reactions to her appointment as Chief Justice ===
- Sen. Francis Pangilinan questioned de Castro's appointment in light of her impending retirement on October 8, saying it "does not help in the strengthening of the rule of law."
- Former Solicitor General Florin Hilbay and opposition lawmaker Gary Alejano said that de Castro's appointment may be considered as the President's way of paying his debt of gratitude to the second most senior magistrate of the high court.

== Education and qualifications ==
=== University and Law School ===
- AB Political Science: University of the Philippines Diliman (cum laude, 1968)
- Bachelor of Laws: University of the Philippines Diliman (1972)

=== Training courses ===
- Seminar on Loan Negotiation and Renegotiation (August 9 to September 5, 1986), International Law Institute, Washington D.C.
- Program of Instruction for Lawyers (June 11–21, 2004), Harvard Law School, Cambridge, Massachusetts
- Seminar Judging Across Borders: Canadian Judges and International Law, (April 6–9, 2005), National Judicial Institute, Victoria, British Columbia, Canada

=== Other honors and qualifications ===
- Phi Kappa Phi International Honor Society;
- Pi Gamma Mu International Honor Society in the Social Sciences;
- Vice Chancellor and consistent Member, Order of the Purple Feather, UP College of Law Honor Society;
- Executive Vice-President, Philippine Women Judges Association;
- UP Sigma Alpha Sorority;
- UP College of Law, Portia Sorority and UP Women Lawyers Circle (WILOCI);
- University and College Scholar at UP Diliman.

== Some notable opinions ==
- G.R. No. 180643, Romulo L. Neri Vs. Senate Committee, et al. (2008) – on the principle of executive privilege over Congress' right to information
- Criminal Case No. 26558 People Vs. Joseph Ejercito Estrada, et al. (Sandiganbayan 2007) – on the conviction of former Philippine President Joseph Estrada for the crime of plunder punishable by life imprisonment Reclusión perpetua

== See also ==
- Supreme Court of the Philippines
- Trial of Joseph Estrada
- Neri vs. Senate Committee

Legal offices
Preceded by Renato Corona de jure - impeached	Chief Justice of the Supreme Court de jure 2018	Succeeded by Lucas Bersamin
Preceded by Maria Lourdes Sereno de facto - appointment null and void ab initio	Chief Justice of the Supreme Court de jure 2018	Succeeded by Lucas Bersamin
Preceded by Cancio Garcia	Associate Justice of the Supreme Court of the Philippines; 2007–2018	Succeeded by Rosmari Carandang
Preceded by Romulo Quimbo	Associate Justice of the Sandiganbayan; 1998–2004	Succeeded by Alexander Gesmundo
Preceded by Edilberto Sandoval (acting)	Presideng Justice of the Sandiganbayan; 2004–2007	Succeeded by Edilberto Sandoval (acting)
