= Presidential Anti-Corruption Commission =

Anti-corruption agency that existed under the presidency of Rodrigo Duterte

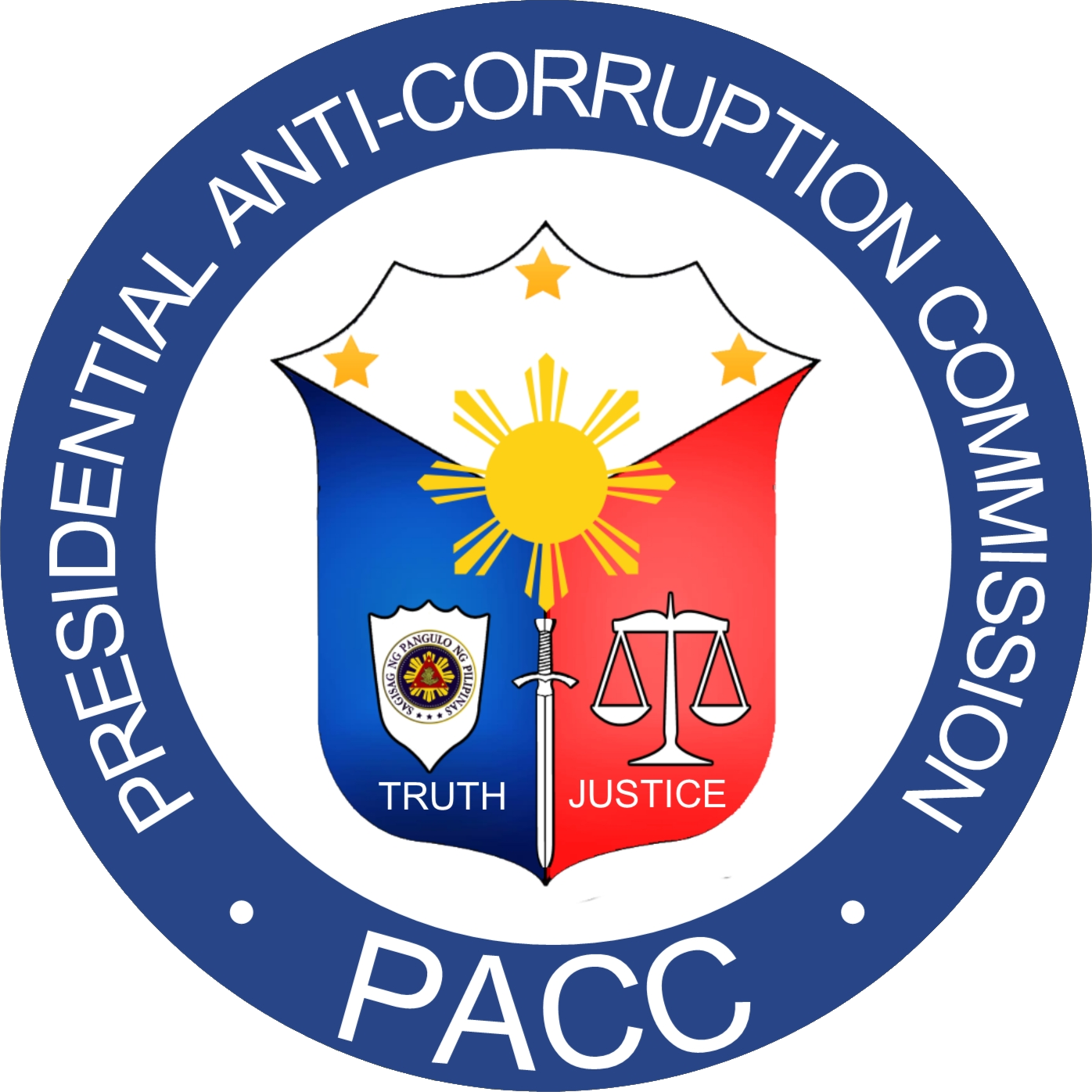

Agency overview
- Formed: October 14, 2017
- Dissolved: June 30, 2022
- Jurisdiction: Philippines
- Status: Defunct
- Headquarters: Palacio del Gobernador, Intramuros, Manila
- Parent agency: Office of the President of the Philippines
- Child agency: National Anti-Corruption Council
- Key document: Executive Order No. 43, s. 2017
- Website: pacc.gov.ph

The Presidential Anti-Corruption Commission (PACC) was an anti-corruption government agency of the Philippines which existed during the administration of President Rodrigo Duterte.

== History ==
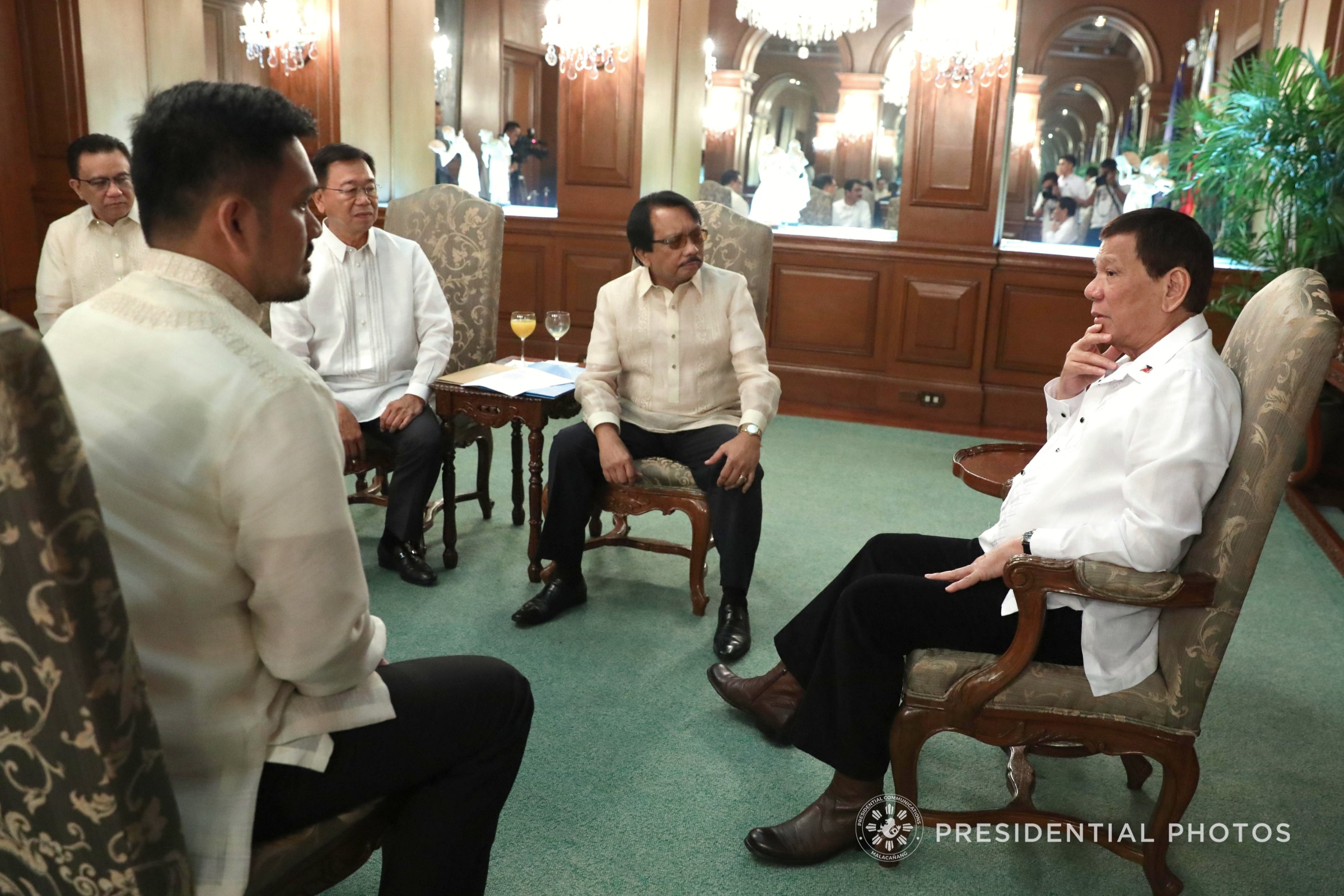
President Rodrigo Duterte (right) discusses matters with PACC Chairman Dante Jimenez and other PACC officials prior to their oath-taking ceremony at the Malacañang Palace on March 6, 2018.

President Rodrigo Duterte created the Presidential Anti-Corruption Commission (PACC) through Executive Order No. 43 which was signed on October 4, 2017. This was a response to Ombudsman Conchita Carpio-Morales, and her deputies Melchor Arthur Carandang and Rodolfo Elman pursuing a fact-finding investigation on Duterte's alleged illegal bank deposits worth at least ₱200 million as stated by Senator Antonio Trillanes. Duterte earlier said he would create a commission to have Carpio-Morales and her deputies investigated for possible abuse of power. The PACC enables the President to conduct lifestyle checks and fact-finding on public officials and employees.

On December 28, 2018, Duterte issued Executive Order No. 73 which mandates the PACC to recommend complaints of violation against the Anti-Red Tape Act to the Anti-Red Tape Authority.

In September 2021, the National Anti-Corruption Coordinating Council (NACC), a child agency under the PACC, was formed amidst the COVID-19 pandemic in the Philippines. The NACC launched the Project Kasangga: Aksyon Kontra Korapsyon, an initiative to improve the detection of anomalous transactions amidst scrutiny on the utilization of the government's funds for the pandemic response by the Duterte administration.

Immediately after assuming the presidency on June 30, 2022, Duterte's successor, President Bongbong Marcos, abolished the PACC through Executive Order No. 1, as part of a reorganization of agencies under the Office of the President in "abolishing duplicated and overlapping official functions". The PACC's powers and function was transferred to the Office of the Deputy Executive Secretary for Legal Affairs, which shall make recommendations on matters requiring its actions to the Executive Secretary for approval of the President.

== Chairpersons ==
Image	Name	Term		Ref.
Image	Name	Start	End	Ref.
	Dante Jimenez	January 12, 2018	January 29, 2021	
	Greco Belgica	March 15, 2021	October 8, 2021	
	Fortunato Guerrero	December 29, 2021	June 30, 2022	

== Commissioners ==
Name	Term	
Name	Start	End
Rickson Chiong	January 12, 2018	June 30, 2022
Yvette Contacto	September 18, 2020	June 30, 2022
Atty, Baldr Bringas	December 29, 2021	June 30, 2022
Jayvee Hinlo	January 25, 2022	June 30, 2022
Danilo Yang	August 2, 2020	May 31, 2021
Greco Belgica	January 12, 2018	March 14, 2021
Gregorio Luis Contacto III	January 12, 2018	April 20, 2020
Atty. Manuelito Luna	April 17, 2018	April 3, 2020

== Executive Directors ==
Name	Term	
Name	Start	End
Irene Chiu	December 29, 2021	June 30, 2022
Fortunato Guerrero		December 28, 2021
Eduardo Bringas	January 12, 2018	February 5, 2020
