= Greco Belgica =

Filipino politician

Greco B. Belgica
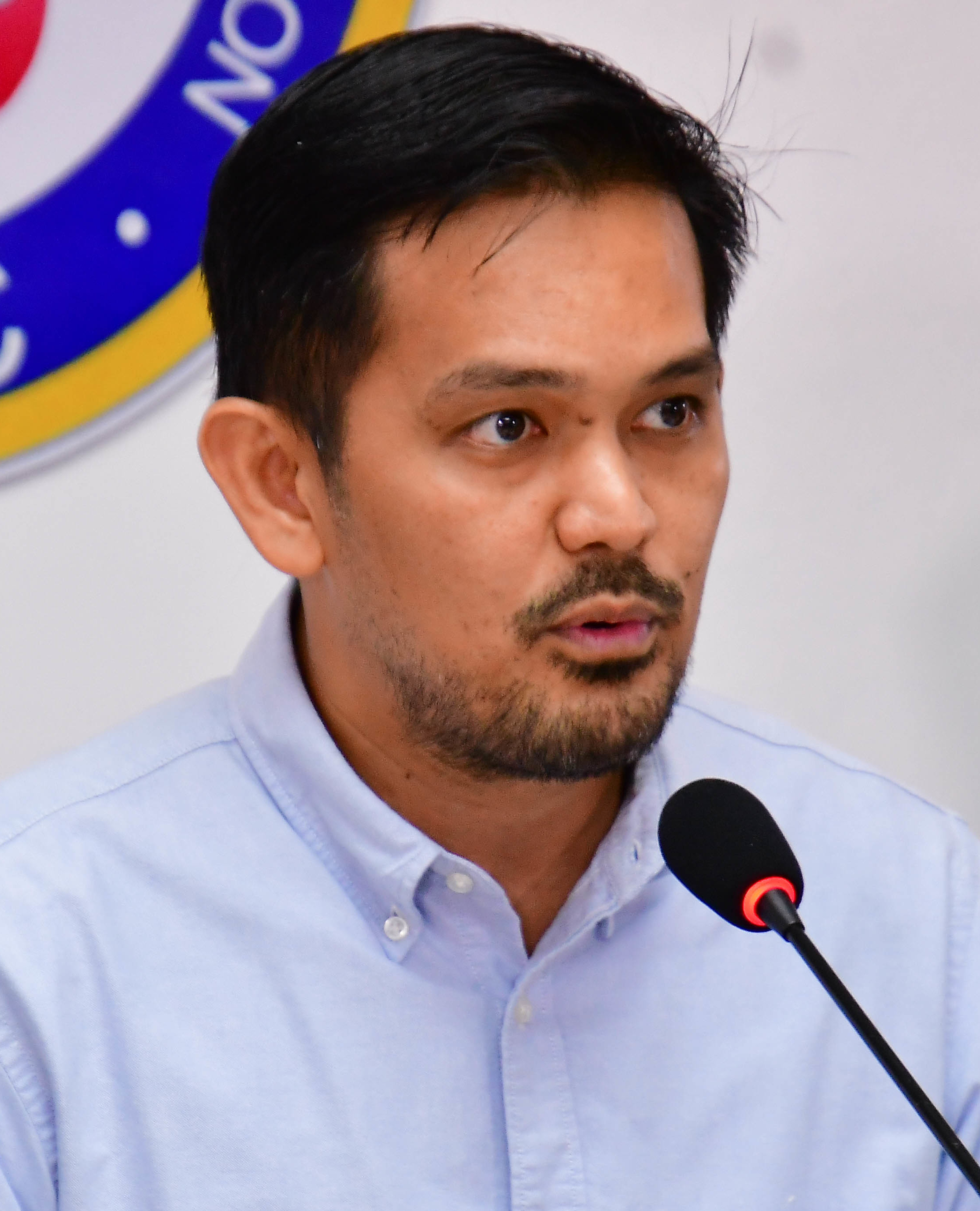
- Belgica in 2019

Chairman of the Presidential Anti-Corruption Commission
- In office March 15, 2021 – October 8, 2021
- President: Rodrigo Duterte
- Preceded by: Dante Jimenez
- Succeeded by: Atty. Fortunato G. Guerrero

Commissioner of the Presidential Anti-Corruption Commission
- In office January 12, 2018 – March 14, 2021
- President: Rodrigo Duterte
- Chairman: Dante Jimenez
- Succeeded by: Atty. Baldr H. Bringas

Member of the Manila City Council from the 6th district
- In office June 30, 2004 – June 30, 2007

Personal details
- Born: March 27, 1978 (age 48) Manila, Philippines
- Party: PDDS (2018–present); Bisaya Gyud (party-list; 2024–present)
- Other political affiliations: Independent (2015–2018); DPP (2012–2015); Liberal (until 2012)
- Spouse: Nina Rizzi Velasco Belgica
- Parent(s): Grepor "Butch" Belgica (father); Carmelita Banta Belgica (mother)
- Education: San Beda College (BS); University of California, Berkeley; National Defense College of the Philippines

Greco Antonious Beda Banta Belgica (born March 27, 1978) is a Filipino politician who most recently served as chairman of the Presidential Anti-Corruption Commission (PACC) under the Duterte administration from March to October 2021.

== Education ==
He graduated from San Beda College with a Bachelor of Science degree in Marketing and Commerce, and earned a postgraduate certificate (but not a degree as he earlier claimed) in International Trade and Commerce at the University of California, Berkeley. He was also one of 42 graduates who completed the pilot class of the Executive Master of Arts in National Security Administration (E-MNSA) at the National Defense College of the Philippines.

== Political career ==
=== Manila City Councilor ===
He was elected as Councilor of the City of Manila in 2004 at the age of 26 and was nicknamed "Batang Magaling". He lost reelection in 2007.

=== 2013 National Elections ===
Belgica ran as a candidate in the 2013 Philippine Senate election under the newly accredited Democratic Party of the Philippines, but failed to win a seat.

One of Belgica's campaign promises was a flat tax system for the Philippines; in particular, a simple, one-time, and one kind tax of not more than 10% only on net income on both individual and business profits. He also espouses belief in a limited and decentralized form of government, a free market, and Christian fundamentalism. He leads the campaign to convert the PDAF and other discretionary funds of politicians to tuition vouchers for all students and capital for families, individuals and businessmen. He believes that money and resources should be in the hands of people and not with politicians and government.

Belgica is the founder of the Truth and Justice Coalition (TJC), a non-stock, non-profit non-government organization which envisions a progressive government where corruption is abhorred and public accountability prevails.

=== 2016 National Elections ===
In the 2016 Senate election, he ran again for a senate seat as an independent candidate and supported Rodrigo Duterte for President. But again, he failed to win a seat.

In September 2017, Belgica along with the Volunteers Against Crime and Corruption (VACC) accused Sen. Sonny Trillanes of using his pork barrel for ghost projects. Trillanes dared Belgica to get a Commission on Audit report, and file a case at the Ombudsman.

Belgica on March 24, 2016, filed a disbarment case against Ombudsman Conchita Carpio Morales over her decision to drop all administrative and criminal cases against former President Benigno Aquino III over the Disbursement Acceleration Program. The Supreme Court dropped all the charges within the few days, indicating that Belgica's complaint is flawed.

On October 30, 2018, he founded the Pederalismo ng Dugong Dakilang Samahan (PDDS), a national political party accredited by the Commission on Elections (COMELEC).

=== Presidential Anti-Corruption Commission ===
On January 12, 2018, he was appointed Commissioner of the Presidential Anti-Corruption Commission (PACC) under the Office of the President of the Philippines.

In a little under a week leading the PACC, Belgica would disclose during a press conference that he has gathered strong enough evidence to pin down the former President Benigno Aquino III over the Disbursement Acceleration Program (DAP). He shared that he is highly confident that a conviction of the former president will be made. On October 15, 2018, Belgica would file 274 counts of malversation of public funds at the Ombudsman through conspiracy against former President Aquino, as well as his administration officials, former Budget Secretary, Florencio Abad, former Transportation Secretary, Emilio Abaya, former DILG Secretary Mar Roxas, former Senators Franklin Drilon and Antonio Trillanes IV, and other subordinates.

On November 13, 2019, Belgica presented in a news conference a bribery attempt by Ifugao District Engineer, Lorna Ricardo. Ricardo was formerly the Assistant District Engineer of Davao City, who also faced cases filed by the Commission on Audit (COA) for substandard work.

PACC in 2019 commenced investigations on the Department of Public Works and Highways (DPWH) officials and their collusion with members of the House of Representatives on their pork barrel after receiving complaints. Belgica would conduct a press conference with Undersecretary Roberto Bernardo, who would later become figured in the flood control scandal of 2025.

When asked to name names during the initial submission of the report to the President, Belgica refused as he felt it would compromise the investigation. Belgica then shared that the scheme would involve congressmen selecting a contractor who then presents himself to the DPWH District Engineer, and the bidding is then rigged in favor of the contractor, who then gives the kickback to the District Engineer and the legislator. At the end only 50% of the budget actually goes to the project itself, resulting to sub-standard work.

Belgica also put his sights on Philippine Health Insurance Corporation (PhilHealth) during the COVID-19 pandemic, as the government owned insurance company face scrutiny after a number of resignation from midlevel managers, complaints over corruption, overpriced purchases, and manipulation by top executives.

On October 23, 2020, employees of the Duty Free Philippines (DFPC) filed administrative and criminal complaints against Belgica for grave misconduct, conduct prejudicial to service, gross inexcusable negligence and violations of Republic Act No. 3019, or the Anti-Graft and Corrupt Practices Act at the Ombudsman. This came out after the DFPC employees reported to Belgica on the abuse of the Supply Delivery Agreement by DFPC officials. The DFPC employees received a copy of the PACC report on the complaint they made, and found that none of the DFPC officials names were even mentioned by Belgica.

Belgica promised the DFPC employees that they would not shell out any money for legal fees, but the complaint indicated that the employees still shelled PhP 1,000 per page of their affidavit, amounting to PhP 130,000 in total.

Using PACC's report, President Duterte, during his televised Monday night address on December 28, 2020, disclosed the names of corrupt DPWH District Engineers and ordered their dismissal, as well as 9 legislators namely former Ifugao Rep. Teddy Baguilat Jr., Quezon City 5th District Rep. Alfred Vargas, Isabela 4th District Rep. Alyssa Tan, Northern Samar 1st District Rep. Paul Daza, Quezon 4th District Rep. Angelina Tan, ACT-CIS Partylist Rep. Eric Yap, Bataan 1st District Rep. Geraldine Roman, Occidental Mindoro Rep. Josephine Sato, and Misamis Occidental 2nd District Rep. Henry Oaminal. Duterte would temper his broadcast by saying that there is no hard evidence, and that being named doesn't actual means guilt, and that the presumption of innocence still holds. The named legislators denounced and denied their inclusion in Duterte's PACC list. The House of Representatives meanwhile dared Belgica to file formal charges against the legislators, and considered the PACC report as malicious. The PACC didn't file any case, and the DPWH District Engineers were only relieved from their posts.

On August 21, 2021, President Duterte would dismiss National Electrification Administration head Edgardo Masongsong, based on the recommendation of PACC due to graft. Masongsong denied the allegation.

He resigned from his post in the PACC to run again for a Senate seat in the 2022 election. He ran under PDDS but lost, finishing 37th.

=== 2022 National Elections ===
Belgica ran under the Tuloy ang Pagbabago Senate slate in his 3rd attempt to run for national office. He only garnered 2,297,798 or 4.23% of the votes cast, landing on the 37th place.

During one his interviews, Belgica said the Philippines should consider nuclear weapons given that its neighbors such as China, South Korea, and Japan possess them. South Korea and Japan do not have nuclear weapons.

The Commission on Elections however had Belgica in its list for "perpetual disqualification from holding public office" along with 544 others, as he has failed to file his Statement of Contributions and Expenses (SOCE) within 30 days. Belgica decried this.

=== 2025 National Elections ===
Belgica filed for his candidacy on October 7, 2024, under the partylist Bisaya Gyud. His party only received a total of 3,366 votes.

Belgica also began a signature campaign to lobby with US President Donald Trump, Russian President Vladimir Putin, Chinese leader Xi Jinping, and Israeli Prime Minister Benjamin Netanyahu, to have former President Rodrigo Duterte to be released by the International Criminal Court. As of September 2025, the signature campaign on Change.org gained 14,301 unique signatures.

== Belgica v. Ochoa ==
In 2013, nine petitions were filed before the Supreme Court of the Philippines regarding the constitutionality of the pork barrel system. One of these petitions were filed by Belgica and his group. The Supreme Court ruled in favor of the petitioners, with a unanimous vote of 14-0-1 abstain, and said that pork barrel system is unconstitutional.

In its landmark decision G.R. No. 208566 the Supreme Court defined that the pork barrel funds are lump sum discretionary funds appropriated in both the executive and legislative department. It further held, that there two kinds of pork barrel funds. The executive lump sum discretionary funds and the legislative lump sum discretionary fund known as the PDAF.

However, in his stint as commissioner of the Presidential Anti-Corruption Commission, Belgica stated that Janet Lim-Napoles, believed to have masterminded the PDAF Scam, is not really the 'mastermind', just 'willing beneficiary'.

== Personal life ==
He is the son of former Presidential Adviser for Religious Affairs, Grepor "Butch" Belgica. His younger brother, Atty. Jeremiah B. Belgica, previously served as the first ever Director-General of the Anti-Red Tape Authority.

Belgica is married to Nina Ricci Velasco, and have four sons and one daughter.

An Elder at The Lord's Vineyard Covenant Community, a Full Gospel church where his father is a Senior Elder, he is president of Yeshua Change Agents, a non-government organization involved in anti-drug campaigns, and advocating societal reform along Biblical principles.

A health and wellness buff, his sporting interests include basketball, swimming, and taekwondo.

He is also the founder of ReformPH Movement, and a member of the Fraternal Order of Eagles.

== Controversy ==
=== Lifestyle Check ===
In March 2018, Belgica announced during a press conference at the Manila Yacht Club that the PACC will conduct lifestyle check on government officials. This would mainly cover presidential appointees. Belgica received criticisms from various officials, such as Magdalo Partylist Representative Gary Alejano, that the activity would just duplicate the functions of the Ombudsman and the Civil Service Commission. Akbayan Party-List Representative Tom Villarin stated this plan of PACC should either be thorough and all encompassing, if not, the investigations might be seen as politically motivated. Isabela Congressman Rodolfo Albano III on the other hand was amused that the press conference on lifestyle check was held at the Manila Yacht Club.

=== Rift with State Prosecutors ===
When the Department of Justice dismissed the illegal drugs cases against suspected drug lords Peter Lim and Kerwin Espinosa, Belgica and the PACC moved to have the State Prosecutors investigated. The PACC submitted a report to President Duterte recommending the suspension of 3 prosecutors who were assigned to handle the case. The State Prosecutors and Prosecution Attorneys Association Inc. (SPPAAI) threw their support behind the State Prosecutors and called the PACC report to the President premature, reckless, and malicious as the Prosecutors' mainly relied on the information provided by the PNP-Criminal Investigation and Detection Group, and that their recommendations will still be reviewed by Justice Secretary Vitaliano Aguirre. However, due to the fall out of the dismissed cases, Sec. Aguirre would resign as Justice Secretary on April 5, 2018, as he felt the public lost their trust in him, and that Macalanang was displeased with the dismissal. Belgica would reiterate that Aguirre was not at fault, and blamed the Prosecutors squarely.

=== PNP Anniversary Gaffe ===
Belgica would defend President Duterte during his controversial statement that police personnel may receive gifts from generous individuals during the 119th Anniversary of the Philippine National Police on August 18, 2019, and added that this is not any form of bribery. Belgica doubled down in the defense during an interview in the TV5 program of Ed Lingao "The Chiefs" saying that PhP 100,000 is just for him to get by, and that it is nothing. Belgica would be caught saying that PhP 100,000 as a gift is insignificant.

=== NBI Entrapment Operation ===
On November 26, 2019, Kilusang Pagbabago Chairwoman, Monalie Dizon, filed graft charges at the Ombudsman against Belgica for participating in an NBI entrapment operation against two Bureau of Internal Revenue officers. Dizon would claim that Belgica's participation was beyond the PACC's jurisdiction Belgica was also accused of possessing a firearm and at one point aimed and was ready to fire at the suspects. Belgica would deny the charges and added that Dizon is part of a terrorist group that is no longer connected to the original group that supported the election of President Duterte.

=== Letter to Xi Jinping ===
During the 2025 National Elections, Belgica began a signature campaign as well as prepared letter to a number of world leaders such as Donald Trump, Vladimir Putin, Benjamin Netanyahu. However, his letter to General Secretary of the Chinese Communist Party Xi Jinping indicated that he was the President of the Republic of China or more commonly known as Taiwan. The said letter was submitted to the People's Republic of China's embassy in Manila.

=== Repost of Troll Post ===
Belgica faced embarrassment when he reshared a troll post at the height of former President Rodrigo Duterte's arrest by the International Criminal Court. The post featured screenshots of supposed statements from fictional characters like Annalise Keating from "How to Get Away with Murder," Harvey Specter from Suits, Saul Goodman from "Better Call Saul" and "Breaking Bad," and Johnny Sins, an adult film performer humorously portrayed as a "world renowned lawyer" with a quote "What the ICC did to Mr. Rodrigo Duterte was illegal. I am willing to offer my services to him for free." Upon realizing that the quoted figures were not real legal experts, he promptly removed the post.

== Filmography ==
=== Television ===
- Bagong Pilipinas (People's Television Network) (2017)
- Ireklamo Kay Greco (DZRH News Television) (2016–2019)
- #GrecoLive (DZRJ-AM) (2016) with CJ Santos
