= Melchor Arthur Carandang =

Filipino lawyer

Overall Deputy Ombudsman of the Philippines
- In office November 5, 2013 – June 14, 2019
- President: Benigno Aquino III; Rodrigo Duterte
- Preceded by: Orlando C. Casimiro
- Succeeded by: Edilberto G. Sandoval (acting)

Personal details
- Spouse: Lorelie M. Carandang
- Education: Ateneo de Manila University (BA); University of Santo Tomas (LL.B.); University of New South Wales (LL.M.)
- Profession: Lawyer

Melchor Arthur H. Carandang is a Filipino lawyer. An associate of the Office of the Ombudsman since 1989, he had served in various positions at the agency such as Assistant Ombudsman from 2002 to 2007, as its legal consultant from 2011 to 2013, and as its Overall Deputy Ombudsman from 2013 until his dismissal in 2019.

At the Ombudsman, Carandang led the investigation into the Fertilizer Fund scam in 2006. In the 2010s, he was in charge of various cases filed before the agency that involved President Rodrigo Duterte and his family; however, in 2018 Carandang was dismissed from office by the Duterte administration. In 2026, the Supreme Court of the Philippines ruled that Duterte's dismissal of Carandang was void and unconstitutional.

== Education ==
Carandang received his Bachelor of Arts degree at the Ateneo de Manila University, and later his Bachelor of Laws degree at the University of Santo Tomas.

Carandang passed the Philippine Bar Examinations in 1991, and later acquired his Master of Laws degree at the University of New South Wales in Australia in the mid-1990s.

== Career ==
Carandang began working at the Office of the Ombudsman in April 1989 while still in college, holding the position of senior planning officer. In 2000, he was appointed head of the Legal, Monitoring and Prosecution Division at the Ombudsman's Fact Finding and Intelligence Bureau, and by 2001 he was made head of a similar division at the agency's Research and Special Studies Bureau. During the tenure of Ombudsman Simeon V. Marcelo, Carandang began serving as Assistant Ombudsman at the agency's Field Investigation Office (FIO), working in close coordination with Marcelo during the plunder investigation against former military comptroller Carlos F. Garcia in 2005 in the Pabaon scandal.

Carandang led the Ombudsman's Task Force Abono, which investigated the Fertilizer Fund scam beginning in February 2006. He later left the agency by 2007 to focus on his private law practice, serving as legal consultant for Yazaki Torres Manufacturing, Inc.

In 2011, he returned to the Office of the Ombudsman as its legal consultant, and by October 2013 was appointed its Overall Deputy Ombudsman (or ODO) by President Benigno Aquino III, being sworn in on November 5, 2013. From January 2014 to November 2016, Carandang served as Acting Special Prosecutor, and by June 2014, Carandang was also designated as Investment Ombudsman.

In May 2014, Carandang terminated his agency's investigation into the Davao Death Squad after the FIO submitted its report to him that was inconclusive of the group's existence and culpability in the systematic killings that occurred in Davao City; the case arose from a 2012 resolution by the Commission on Human Rights. The report had cited Alberto Sipaco Jr., director of the Commission on Human Rights Region XI, as stating that his office was not able to find proof of the existence of DDS.

In December 2016, self-confessed former contract killer Edgar Matobato filed a complaint before the Ombudsman asking the agency to investigate president Duterte for crimes against humanity, accusing him of forming the Davao Death Squad during his tenure as Davao City mayor. Based on the complaint, Carandang later began a preliminary investigation into the DDS in late August 2017 for two murder cases, thus reopening the agency's probe into the group; president Duterte, however, was not included as a respondent. Matobato soon expressed his intention to petition the Ombudsman to include president Duterte in its case. Imprisoned Senator Leila de Lima, who had previously argued that the Ombudsman should "proceed with urgency" due to evidence of Duterte's alleged crimes as mayor, later deemed this exclusion an error that "practically seals the fate on any domestic remedial measure on the accountability of President Duterte".

=== Attempted investigation into President Duterte's bank records (Trillanes v. Duterte) ===
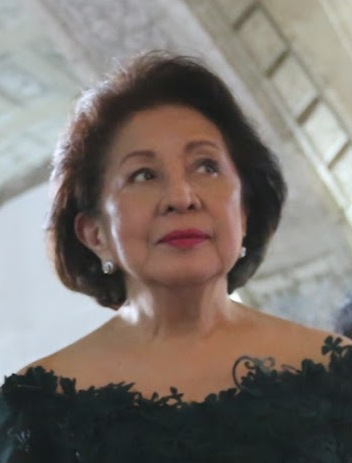
As Ombudsman, Conchita Carpio-Morales authorized ODO Carandang to handle all cases involving the Duterte family due to her conflict of interest.

On May 5, 2016, Senator Antonio Trillanes filed a plunder complaint to the Ombudsman against then-mayor Rodrigo Duterte of Davao City and his family, accusing him of embezzling public funds that went undeclared in his SALN which he based on alleged bank documents that he retrieved. Trillanes' complaint was simultaneous to five other cases against Duterte that were pending before the Ombudsman at the time. After Duterte won the 2016 presidential election that same month, Ombudsman Conchita Carpio-Morales affirmed her office's commitment in pursuing Duterte's cases to determine their merits. However, due to Carpio-Morales' conflict of interest as the aunt of Mans Carpio (Duterte's son-in-law), she recused herself from all investigations related to Duterte, and thus authorized ODO Carandang to be in charge of his cases.

On the evening of September 26, 2017, Carandang held a press conference revealing that the Ombudsman has received bank transaction records of president Duterte and his family from the Anti-Money Laundering Council (AMLC), and that based on those documents and Trillanes' submitted copy of the alleged bank records in 2016, he stated that "more or less, they have the same details", with the preface that he "cannot confirm" his assessment definitively yet as the bank records they possess cannot be totaled with certainty. Carandang also noted that he approved last August the request of Rodolfo Elman, the Deputy Ombudsman for Mindanao conducting the fact-finding investigation, to ask for the AMLC's final report on the records, which was not yet provided to the Ombudsman, and attested that their investigation was simultaneous to AMLC's own separate probe into Duterte's bank records for potential money laundering. The press conference was held amidst the Duterte administration's feud with Trillanes and ombudsman Carpio-Morales.

On September 28, the AMLC issued a statement claiming that it had yet to provide the Ombudsman "any report as a consequence of any investigation of subject accounts" as it had not yet initiated an investigation into Duterte's bank records, with the agency stating that it was still evaluating Carandang's letter of request from August 17, 2017 that it received on September 6. The agency also mentioned that Trillanes' copy of Duterte's bank records, attached to Carandang's letter, did not come from their agency (Trillanes' own request to the AMLC for the Duterte family's bank documents had been denied in April 2017). Trillanes initially expressed concerns about the statement's possible inauthenticity due to the lack of a signature and date on the document; the AMLC itself, however, later confirmed in a letter to Solicitor General Jose Calida that the statement is authentic. The Office of the Ombudsman also issued a statement that contains a brief line responding to AMLC's claim: "As to the documents in [the Ombudsman's] possession, the office stands by its word."

Although presidential spokesperson Ernesto Abella initially stated that president Duterte "respects the internal processes of the Ombudsman" for he has "nothing to hide", Duterte threatened in an interview with Erwin Tulfo on September 28 to form his own commission to investigate corruption at the Ombudsman and arrest agency officials that do not comply. Two days later, he declared in an expletive-laden speech that he will not cooperate with the agency's probe into his bank records, promising to resign if ₱200 million was found in his bank account and calling Carandang a liar for using Trillanes' documents that Duterte claims to be fake; he further stated: "Pray, Carandang. I'm not threatening you. If the Philippines becomes a mess, I will go after you first." In response to Duterte's statements in the Tulfo interview, the Ombudsman released a statement affirming that "this office shall not be intimidated.... If the President has nothing to hide, he has nothing to fear."

On October 2, 2017, the Office of the Ombudsman issued a press statement clarifying Carandang's earlier statements, attesting that Carandang was basing his comments on documents provided by the media during an ambush interview where they asked about the status of Trillanes' complaint. It also noted that Carandang affirms the agency to have "observed confidentiality" throughout its investigation into Trillanes' complaint against Duterte. The Philippine Star noted, however, that no ambush interview was conducted with Carandang when he first revealed the ongoing investigation. On the same day, presidential spokesperson Harry Roque criticized Carandang for his earlier statements that he described as "precipitous and preemptive", stating: "Given that constitutional and political institutions are now under heightened scrutiny, no good can come out of pitting the Ombudsman against the President. Finish the investigation and let the result speak for itself". Senator Koko Pimentel also noted that the agency "theoretically" has no legal authority over president Duterte, stating that "No one is immune from investigation, but the President is immune from suits, from cases, except an impeachment case, but the President is also not required to cooperate with this investigation [by the] Ombudsman."

Carandang later terminated the plunder investigation on November 29, 2017 upon recommendation by Cyril E. Ramos, Deputy Ombudsman for Military and Other Law Enforcement Offices (MOLEO), due to the lack of cooperation from the AMLC, although the lack of a formal dismissal allows for the case to be refiled. By May 2018, five cases against former Davao City Vice Mayor Paolo Duterte, president Duterte's son, were also pending before the Ombudsman, while a ₱6.4 billion methamphetamine ("shabu") shipment case against Paolo and Mans Carpio that began in November 2017 was dismissed by the agency's fact-finding team for "lack of basis". Carandang initially handled the Paolo Duterte cases, but by June 2018, ombudsman Carpio-Morales stated that Deputy Ombudsman Ramos had since taken over the investigations.

=== Administrative complaints; preventive suspension and dismissal ===
On October 3, 2017, Carandang was charged by lawyers Manuelito Luna and Eligio Mallari before the Office of the President of graft and betrayal of public trust for his allegedly false claim that the AMLC issued a "report" on Duterte's financial records that was shared to the Ombudsman; also included in the complaint were Deputy Ombudsman for Mindanao Rodolfo Elman and his fact-finding team for violating the bank secrecy law by providing Duterte's accounts to Carandang. In the weeks prior, Luna had filed an impeachment complaint against COMELEC chairman Andy Bautista while Mallari filed an impeachment complaint against Chief Justice Maria Lourdes Sereno. After filing the complaint, Luna also voiced his opinion that the Ombudsman's motive for the investigation was likely "to sabotage the economy[...] and to destroy the presidency". Mallari would later be suspended from law practice for two years the next year for unethical conduct in blocking a lower court's ruling for his unsettled GSIS loan.

On the same day, former representatives Jacinto Paras of Negros Oriental and Glenn Chong of Biliran also filed charges against Carandang before the Office of the President for "gross misconduct" and "grave "dishonesty" in disclosing bank records that were revealed to be "falsified and spurious". Paras, a political affairs adviser to president Duterte, noted his feeling that Carandang, as an Aquino appointee, was part of a plot to "destabilize this government", and claimed Carpio-Morales to be behind the plot in spite of her stated inhibition from the investigations. When asked by a reporter how he knew about this, Paras answered "Because I'm intelligent." A day later, president Duterte echoed their accusations against the Ombudsman in his call to impeach Carpio-Morales for being "part of the conspiracy, the fabricated papers."

On January 29, 2018, Carandang was issued a 90-day preventive suspension order by Malacañang Palace after Executive Secretary Salvador Medialdea formally charged him with both "grave misconduct" and "grave dishonesty" for disclosing "unauthenticated" documents pertaining to the bank accounts of the Duterte family; Medialdea reasoned that Carandang was "guilty of divulging valuable information of a confidential character", and based the charges on the complaint filed by Luna and Mallari. Carandang was thus given ten days to explain why he should not be suspended. The suspension order for Carandang was criticized by several lawmakers and academics as a violation of the Ombudsman's independence, which is provided for by the Constitution, while Senator Risa Hontiveros argumentatively asked "How can anybody be guilty of divulging valuable information that, according to Malacañang, is fake?" Ombudsman Carpio-Morales also refused to recognize the order for it being "unconstitutional", stating that she will not "allow herself to betray her sworn duty to uphold the Constitution."

On February 13, 2018, Solicitor General Jose Calida held a press conference where he announced to the media the termination of the Ombudsman's investigation into Duterte's finances back in November 2017 according to a letter he received from Carandang, with Calida interpreting the case to have been "dismissed" due to Trillanes' evidence being "garbage" while questioning Ombudsman Carpio-Morales as to why this was not publicized before. By February 15, ombudsman Carpio-Morales issued a statement emphasizing that the investigation was "closed and terminated" without being dismissed, and is thus allowed to be refiled with new evidence, and argued that her recusal from the cases involving Duterte, as "[Calida] pointed out", would make it improper for her to intervene, adding that she only found out about the termination when Carandang was ordered suspended. She also pointed out that Calida's initial letter of inquiry to Carandang on February 8 acknowledged him as deputy ombudsman, which she asserts is a "recognition of the unconstitutionality of the preventive suspension order" against Carandang.

By May 2018, ombudsman Carpio-Morales announced that Carandang was being investigated motu proprio by the agency to determine if he violated any law in his investigation into the Duterte family's financial records. She stated that the probe of Carandang, whose suspension was never enforced, was based on the president's accusation that he violated bank secrecy laws. The agency's Internal Affairs Board, headed by Deputy Ombudsman for Luzon Gerard Mosquera, led the investigation.

On July 30, 2018, Carandang was ordered dismissed by Malacañang Palace in a decision signed by Executive Secretary Medialdea for being found liable for graft and corruption and betrayal of public trust, a decision which newly-appointed Ombudsman Samuel Martires later affirmed he would have "no choice" but to enforce. The order for Carandang's dismissal was criticized by observers as illegal for violating a Supreme Court ruling from 2014 barring the president from removing a deputy ombudsman from office. Although Carandang immediately appealed the decision, Malacañang ultimately denied his appeal in early June 2019. The enforcement of Carandang's dismissal occurred on June 14, 2019, which he later appealed before the Court of Appeals; Ombudsman Special Prosecutor Edilberto G. Sandoval immediately succeeded him as acting Deputy Ombudsman. On November 26, 2020, president Duterte formally appointed lawyer Warren Rex Liong, procurement director at the Department of Budget and Management and Duterte's counsel during the 2007 and 2010 mayoral elections in Davao City, as the Overall Deputy Ombudsman. Liong would later be implicated in the Pharmally scandal in 2021.

In a 2026 decision, the Supreme Court ruled that "[b]y constitutional design, the President possesses no administrative or disciplinary authority over a Deputy Ombudsman", thus establishing Carandang's dismissal as void. The ruling described the dismissal as "direct affront to accountability" and "the very evil the Constitution sought to guard against". Carandang was also entitled to receive his back salaries and retirement benefits.

== Personal life ==
Carandang is married to dentist Lorelie M. Carandang. They have three children.
