= Priority Development Assistance Fund =

Discretionary fund available to members of the Congress of the Philippines

The Priority Development Assistance Fund (PDAF) was a discretionary fund in the Philippines available to members of Congress. Originally established as the Countrywide Development Fund (CDF) in 1990, it was designed to allow legislators to fund small-scale infrastructure or community projects which fell outside the scope of the national infrastructure program, which was often restricted to large infrastructure items.

The PDAF was commonly called the "pork barrel", and was the subject of much public criticism following exposés on abuses perpetuated by members of Congress on use of the fund in 1996 and 2013.

On November 19, 2013, the Supreme Court declared the PDAF unconstitutional, thereby abolishing it.

== See also ==
- People's Initiative Against Pork Barrel
- Priority Development Assistance Fund scam
- Padrino System
- Disbursement Acceleration Program
