= Dante Jimenez =

Filipino educator and victims' rights campaigner (1952–2021)

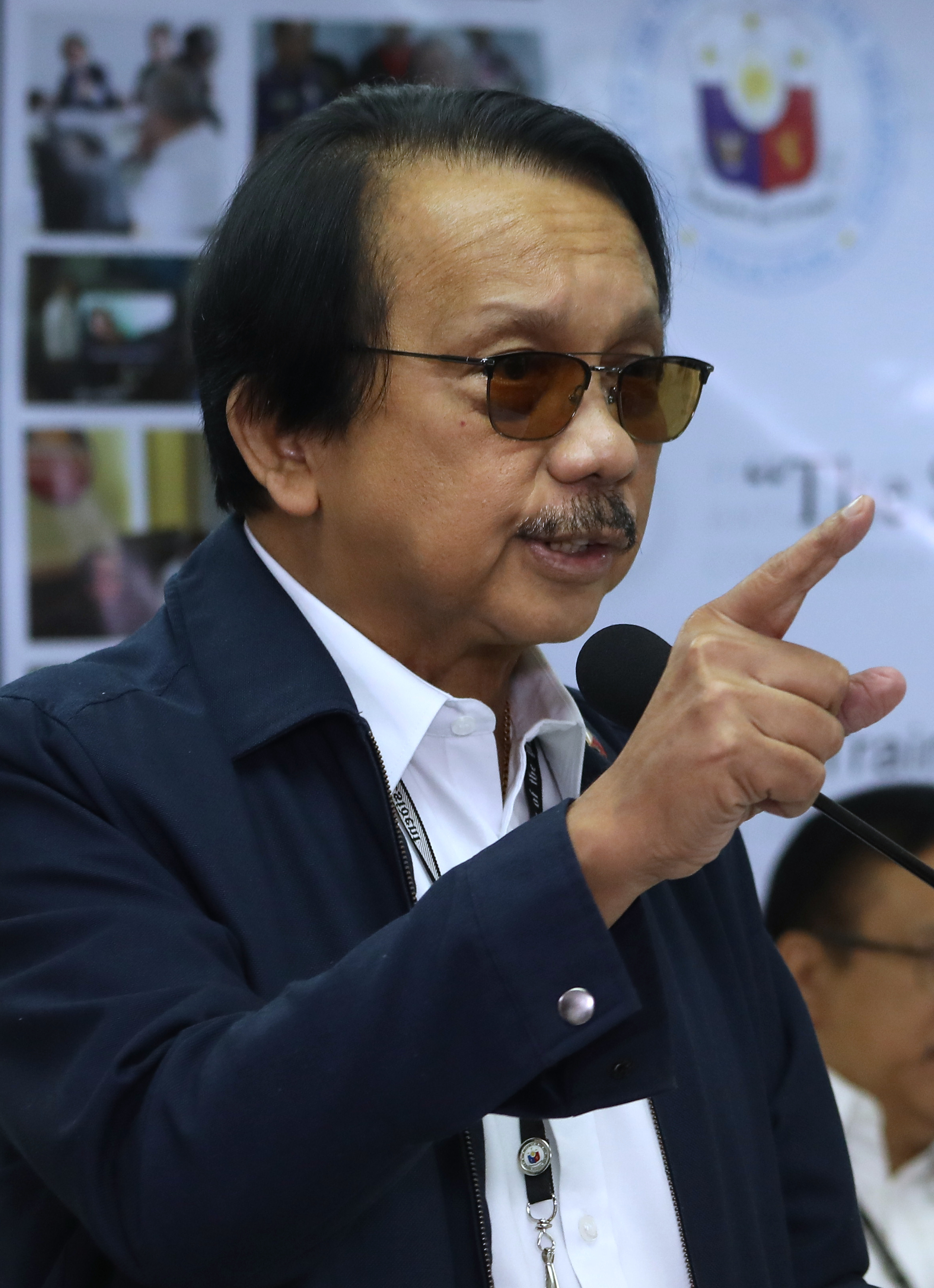
- Jimenez in 2019

Chairperson of the Presidential Anti-Corruption Commission
- In office January 12, 2018 – January 29, 2021
- President: Rodrigo Duterte
- Preceded by: Position created
- Succeeded by: Greco Belgica

Co-Chairperson of the Inter-Agency Committee on Anti-Illegal Drugs
- In office February 21, 2020 – January 29, 2021 Serving with Aaron Aquino (2020); Wilkins Villanueva (2020–2021)
- President: Rodrigo Duterte
- Preceded by: Leni Robredo
- Succeeded by: Vacant

Personal details
- Born: Dante Lazaro Jimenez; August 4, 1952 Mandaluyong, Rizal, Philippines
- Died: January 29, 2021 (aged 68) Manila, Philippines
- Children: 3
- Education: University of Santo Tomas (BA)
- Occupation: Government official
- Profession: Educator and advocate

Dante Lazaro Jimenez (August 4, 1952 – January 29, 2021) was a Filipino educator and victims' rights campaigner best known as the founder of the advocacy group Volunteers Against Crime and Corruption. He was a prominent figure in the Duterte administration, serving as the inaugural chairman of the Presidential Anti-Corruption Commission from 2018 and as co-chairman of the Inter-Agency Committee on Anti-Illegal Drugs from 2020. A retired Philippine Navy officer, he also founded the Mariners' Polytechnic Colleges Foundation Legazpi, a maritime academy in Legazpi.

== Early life and education ==
Jimenez was the third of seven children born to Bicolano parents in Mandaluyong. His father Jaime Chavez Jimenez Sr. was a World War II guerilla veteran from Libmanan, Camarines Sur who served as a post-war Philippine Navy commodore and who founded the Merchants' Polytechnic University in Manila. His mother Eliza dela Torre Lazaro hailed from the city of Naga, Camarines Sur and was co-founder of the maritime school in the city. Jimenez initially attended primary school at Don Bosco Technical Institute in Mandaluyong where his father worked as dean of the Naval Architecture and Marine Engineering Institute. He then moved with his family to the Philippine Navy barracks of the Plaza Militar in Malate and finished both elementary and high school at Malate Catholic School. Jimenez took up journalism as a prerequisite for his planned career in Law. He earned a Bachelor of Arts degree from the University of Santo Tomas in 1973.

== Career ==
Jimenez started out as a manager of a security agency that his father established soon after graduating from university in 1973. He also worked short-term as a disc jockey for a radio station in Quezon City before signing up with the Philippine Navy like his father in 1974. As a young Navy lieutenant, he served as intelligence officer of the Naval Operating Forces (F-2). After spending eleven years in uniform, he applied for early retirement and joined his parents' maritime education businesses in Naga and Canaman in 1985.

Jimenez ventured on his own and started the Mariners' Polytechnic Colleges in the city of Legazpi in 1985. He served as the school's first administrator and president while also serving as a two-term president of the Philippine Association of Maritime Institutions. In 1991, he began active participation in civil society as a co-founder of a victims' rights group, Crusade Against Violence (CAV) with Lauro Vizconde and Romulo Villa. He then delved into political activism and co-founded the Volunteers Against Crime and Corruption in 1998. He also began writing for Pilipino Star Ngayon and People's Tonight and also hosted a television talk show on GNN.

After having spent most of his career in the maritime education industry and anti-crime and anti-graft advocacy, Jimenez returned to public service on January 12, 2018. He was appointed by President Rodrigo Duterte as Chairperson of the Presidential Anti-Corruption Commission formed through Executive Order No. 43 issued in October 2017. As PACC chair, Jimenez was in charge of handling the administrative cases against presidential appointees in the executive department and the investigations on alleged corruption and anomalies committed by officials of PhilHealth, Department of Public Works and Highways and Bureau of Customs in 2020. On February 21, 2020, Jimenez succeeded Vice President Leni Robredo as Co-Chairperson of the Inter-Agency Committee on Anti-Illegal Drugs.

== Activism ==
In his autobiographical book Profile of a Crusader published in 2001, Jimenez narrated how the murder of his brother Jaime Jr. or Boboy by a drug syndicate in a case of mistaken identity in December 1990 prompted him to help organize the victims' rights group Crusade Against Violence (CAV) together with Romulo Villa. Villa, the crusade's co-founder and chair, was the father of hazing victim Leonardo Villa. Jimenez eventually served as the group's chairman and in 1998, together with Lauro Vizconde, formed a new criminal justice advocacy group, the Volunteers Against Crime and Corruption (VACC). Through the CAV and VACC, Jimenez rallied support for a return to capital punishment for heinous crimes.

Jimenez, as chair of the VACC, became involved in political anti-graft activism and was a leading figure in the prosecution of former President Joseph Estrada on plunder charges in the early 2000s and Janet Lim-Napoles and others involved in the Priority Development Assistance Fund scam in 2013. He also led the filing of malversation charges against former President Benigno Aquino III for alleged anomalies in the Disbursement Acceleration Program, the criminal charges against Senator Leila de Lima for her alleged involvement in the New Bilibid Prison drug trafficking scandal, and the impeachment complaints against Supreme Court chief justice Maria Lourdes Sereno and Commission on Elections chair Andres Bautista.

== Personal life and death ==
Jimenez was married to a fellow naval intelligence officer. They wed on January 8, 1987, at the Malate Church and had three daughters. He died on January 29, 2021, of an aortic aneurysm at the age of 68.
