= Jacinto Paras =

Filipino lawyer (born 1953)

Jacinto Villegas Paras
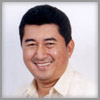
- Official portrait, 2004

Presidential Adviser on Political Affairs
- In office July 8, 2021 – June 30, 2022
- President: Rodrigo Duterte

Member of the Philippine House of Representatives from Negros Oriental's 1st district
- In office June 30, 1998 – June 30, 2007
- Preceded by: Jerome V. Paras
- Succeeded by: Jocelyn Sy-Limkaichong

Mayor of Guihulngan
- In office 1986–1988

Personal details
- Born: September 11, 1953 (age 73)
- Party: Lakas (2009–2015; 2018–present)
- Other political affiliations: NUP (2015–2018); LDP (2004–2009); Lakas–NUCD (2001–2004); LAMMP (1998–2000)
- Spouse: Olivia Paras
- Education: University of the Philippines
- Profession: Lawyer

Jacinto "Jing" Villegas Paras (born September 11, 1953) is a Filipino lawyer and politician who is a member of the Cabinet of the Philippines and Presidential Adviser on Political Affairs of former President Rodrigo Duterte with the rank of Secretary.

== Early life and education ==
Jing Paras finished his Elementary and High School education from St. Francis College in the City of Guihulngan, Negros Oriental. For college, he finished from University of the Philippines Diliman with a Bachelor of Arts in Economics degree. He is a member of Upsilon Sigma Phi.

He then got his Bachelor of Laws in 1985 from the University of the Philippines College of Law, and a Masters in Business Administration in 1983 from De La Salle University.

== Career ==
He was president and CEO of the Pantranco Bus Company from 1990 to 1992, Director of the United Coconut Planters Bank, Director of the Philippine Communications Satellite Corporation from 1993 to 1998, and President and CEO of Call Telecoms Inc. from 1995 to 1998.

He also sat as Chairman of the Board of the Philippine National Oil Company from 2008 to 2010, as President and CEO of World Spices International Cuisine Inc. from 2011 to 2017, and Legal Adviser of the Volunteers Against Crime and Corruption from 2016 to 2017.

=== Political career ===
Paras served as OIC mayor of the City of Guihulngan, Negros Oriental from 1986 to 1988, Assistant Secretary of the Department of Agrarian Reform from 1988 to 1989, Assistant Director (with the rank of Assistant Secretary) of the Municipal Telephone Program of the Department of Transportation and Communications from 1989 to 1992, and Head of the DOTC Action Center from 1989 to 1992.

==== House of Representatives of the Philippines (1998–2007) ====
He was elected as member of the House of Representatives in 1998, succeeding his brother Jerome, and served for three terms until 2007. As representative of Negros Oriental's 1st district, he was chairman of the Special Committee on Food Security from 1998 to 2001, chairman of the Committee on Transportation and Communications from 2001 to 2007, and vice-chairman of the Committee on Franchises from 1998 to 2007.

Paras resigned from the Laban ng Makabayang Masang Pilipino (LAMMP) coalition on November 3, 2000 due to the corruption scandal of President Joseph Estrada, and later became a member of the Lakas–NUCD, the party of Estrada's successor Gloria Macapagal Arroyo, on June 30, 2001. In September 2001, Paras was identified as a member of the "Gang of Five" within Congress by the news media, with the group being accused of receiving ₱2 million for each member to delay House inquiries into the alleged collusion between telecommunications companies Smart Communications and Globe Telecom. Paras was later among the 11 Lakas members of Congress who signed the impeachment complaint against Chief Justice Hilario Davide Jr. in October 2003, as authored by Tarlac Representative Gibo Teodoro and Camarines Sur Representative Felix William Fuentebella of the seven "Brat Pack" congressmen.

In 2003, Paras was the foremost supporter of businessman Danding Cojuangco within the Lakas–NUCD, expressing his confidence in Cojuangco's potential candidacy for president in 2004 and proposing to form a new coalition of opposition factions by breaking away from Lakas itself to convince Cojuangco to run. Paras was thus removed as Lakas president for Negros Oriental on October 12, 2003. When Cojuangco declined to enter the presidential race and opted instead to endorse incumbent president Gloria Macapagal Arroyo, Paras and his brother Jerome declared their support for Arroyo. However, by March 2004, Paras switched his support to Arroyo's opponent, the actor Fernando Poe Jr., without consulting his party (since renamed Lakas–CMD) or his brother, and was thus removed as Lakas district chairman in his congressional district, being replaced with Jerome by President Arroyo; Paras resigned from Lakas–CMD soon after.

In the 2007 election, Paras' wife Olivia ran to succeed him as 1st district representative of Negros Oriental, with his brother Jerome running against her. However, both candidates were ultimately defeated by Jocelyn Limkaichong.

==== Post-congressional activities ====
Paras ran for another term as representative of Negros Oriental's 1st district in 2016 under the National Unity Party, but lost to Liberal candidate Jocelyn Limkaichong. Paras ran for the same position in 2019, but was once again defeated by Limkaichong.

By January 2017, Paras was noted to be a member of the Volunteers Against Crime and Corruption (VACC), with him tasked to lead its legal panel in preparing an impeachment complaint against Ombudsman Conchita Carpio-Morales, whom they accused of being either too slow or unfairly dismissive of filed complaints by the VACC and other NGOs.

In September 2017, Paras sparked controversy after it was exposed, with photo evidences, that he was conspiring with then-Justice Secretary Vitaliano Aguirre II to imprison Senator Risa Hontiveros using false charges. Media captured Aguirre texting instructions to 'expedite' cases through Paras, a tactic previously used to arrest Senator Leila de Lima. Despite public backlash and evidence presented in the Senate, Aguirre and his team still pursued and filed the false charges against Hontiveros.

A month later, on October 3, 2017, Paras and former Biliran representative Glenn Chong filed charges against Deputy Ombudsman Melchor Arthur Carandang, the official tasked with investigating Duterte-related complaints at the Ombudsman. The two accused Carandang of "gross misconduct" and "grave dishonesty" for disclosing information about President Duterte's bank records that seemed to be revealed as "falsified and spurious", with Paras commenting his feeling that Carandang, as an Aquino appointee, was part of a plot to "destabilize this government" as planned by Ombudsman Conchita Carpio-Morales in spite of her stated inhibition from the investigations. When asked by a reporter how he knew about this, Paras answered "Because I'm intelligent." A day later, president Duterte echoed their accusations against the Ombudsman in his call to impeach Carpio-Morales for being "part of the conspiracy, the fabricated papers."

In November 2017, Paras and Chong filed a complaint against Senator Antonio Trillanes for sedition, rebellion and violation of the Anti-Money Laundering Act, which they based on the latter's comments about Duterte's bank accounts that they claimed "encouraged the military to kill the President", with Trillanes deeming their complaint "absurd".

Paras began serving as undersecretary of the Department of Labor and Employment in January 2018. In May 2018, Paras was sued for theft by Akbayan partylist representative Tom Villarin, who accused him of stealing his iPhone X during a congressional hearing in March, with Villarin calling for his censure and ban from the House premises. By June 2018, Paras filed another criminal complaint against Trillanes, with him alleging that the latter issued a grave threat against him when they crossed paths at the Senate; Trillanes countered that "Paras has the zero-credibility of a cellphone thief."

In January 2020, Paras was appointed by President Duterte as undersecretary of the Presidential Legislative Liaison Office (PLLO). Later that year, a news site called "SovereignPH" was established by Paras, with radio commentator Adolfo Q. Paglinawan as its editor-in-chief and Sulong Pilipino founder Herman Tiu Laurel, a former senatorial candidate in 1995 under PRP, as its main op-ed columnist. The site mimicked the form and blue color of the news site Inquirer.net, and had articles that were often amplified by pro-China networks on Facebook. Both Paglinawan and Laurel were recipients of the 2021 Award for the Promotion of Philippine-China Understanding (APPCU). In February 2021, Paras was accused by Quezon City Rep. Angelina Tan of spreading false claims of corruption against her and her husband Ronnel Tan, a regional director at the Department of Public Works and Highways (DPWH), in a TikTok video made by SovereignPH, after which Paras filed a libel suit against her before the Quezon City Prosecutor's Office. By April 2023, the SovereignPH website was no longer reachable.

On July 7, 2021, President Duterte appointed Paras to be his presidential adviser on political affairs, with him serving in the position until the end of Duterte's presidency in June 2022.

In July 2026, Paras was linked by the National Bureau of Investigation (NBI) to an alleged scheme to implicate Executive Secretary Ralph Recto in a manufactured sexual scandal after the agency arrested a talent manager at a hotel in Manila, with five women being brought from the hotel to the NBI's protective custody.
