= Aniano A. Desierto =

Filipino judge and ombudsman (born 1935)

Aniano Aguilar Desierto

2nd Ombudsman of the Philippines
- In office August 4, 1995 – August 2, 2002
- President: Fidel V. Ramos; Joseph Estrada; Gloria Macapagal Arroyo
- Preceded by: Conrado M. Vasquez
- Succeeded by: Simeon V. Marcelo

Personal details
- Born: April 25, 1935 (age 90) Cebu City, Philippine Islands (Philippines)
- Profession: Politician

Aniano Aguilar Desierto (born April 25, 1935) is a former Ombudsman of the Republic of the Philippines from 1995 to 2002. He headed the Ombudsman Office which investigates all government officials who defy the law of conduct. He assumed the Office of the Philippine Ombudsman on August 4, 1995, as the second person to head the post.

== Personal life ==
Desierto was born on April 25, 1935, in Cebu City. He received his secondary education at the University of San Carlos (USC) in Cebu City, where he also obtained an Associate in Arts. He later obtained Bachelor of Arts and Bachelor of Law degrees at the University of the Philippines Diliman in 1957, and was admitted to the Philippine Bar in 1958. Desierto also took up General Management and Marketing Courses at the Ateneo de Manila University and a master's degree at the Philippine Christian University.

Desierto was the provincial division manager of the Manila Broadcasting Company and of the Metropolitan Broadcasting Company. He is married to Commissioner Teresita A. Desierto.

== Career ==
From 1961 to 1974, Desierto was engaged in private law practice in Cebu and Manila. He started his legal career in government when he was appointed as Judge Advocate, Office of the AFP Judge Advocate General in 1974. In 1988, he was appointed Deputy Judge Advocate General. He later served as the Special Prosecutor of the Prosecution Bureau of the Office of the Ombudsman from April 1, 1991, to August 3, 1995.

On August 4, 1995, he was appointed Ombudsman by then President Fidel V. Ramos. He served until he retired, or "finish(ed) my term" as he stated it, in August 2002. He was criticized by some for not aggressively investigating and prosecuting cases of corruption. After he left office, he unsuccessfully sought a slot on the country's Supreme Court.

== See also ==
- Philippine Ombudsman
- Department of Justice (Philippines)

Preceded by Conrado M. Vasquez	Ombudsman of the Republic of the Philippines; 1995–2002	Succeeded by Simeon V. Marcelo
