= Mans Carpio =

Filipino lawyer and husband of Sara Duterte

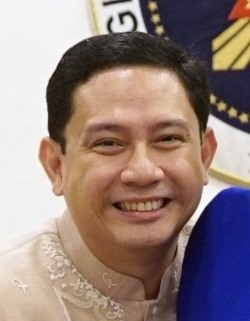
- Carpio in 2018
- Born: Manases Reyes Carpio; February 8, 1976 (age 50)
- Citizenship: Filipino
- Education: De La Salle University (B.A.); San Beda College; San Sebastian College – Recoletos (LL.B.)
- Occupation: Lawyer
- Spouse: Sara Duterte (m. 2007)
- Children: 3
- Relatives: Conchita Carpio-Morales (aunt); Rodrigo Duterte (father-in-law); Elizabeth Zimmerman (mother-in-law); Sebastian Duterte (brother-in-law); Paolo Duterte (brother-in-law)
- Family: Duterte (by marriage)

Manases "Mans" Reyes Carpio (Tagalog: [manaˈses ˈɾejes ˈkaɾpjo]; born February 8, 1976) is a Filipino lawyer and the husband of Vice President Sara Duterte. He is the second male spouse of a Philippine vice president, after Jose Miguel Arroyo, husband of Vice President Gloria Macapagal Arroyo from 1998 to 2001.

== Early life and education ==
Manases Carpio was born on February 8, 1976 to lawyers Lucas C. Carpio Jr., a brother of Conchita Carpio-Morales, and Agnes Reyes-Carpio, who served as judge for several regional trial courts and was an associate justice for the Court of Appeals from 2009 to 2016. Lucas Carpio has a law office named Carpio & Bello Law Offices, which he co-founded with Silvestre Bello III, the eventual labor secretary under President Rodrigo Duterte.

Mans Carpio graduated from De La Salle University in 1998 where he obtained his undergraduate degree in political science. Born in a family of lawyers, he also followed in the footsteps of his lineage, obtaining his Bachelor of Laws at the San Sebastian College – Recoletos in 2002. By 2004, he passed the Philippine Bar Examination. He also studied at San Beda University where he met his wife, Sara Duterte.

== Legal career ==
While his wife was busy serving Davao City where she was first elected as vice mayor in 2007, Carpio engaged himself with private practice, establishing and managing his own law firm in 2008 which he named the Carpio & Duterte Lawyers, together with his wife Sara and a lawyer named Elijah Pepito. Carpio later spent time with their law firm after Sara decided not to run for public office in 2013. Their law firm specializes in business, commercial, and labor litigation, and serves both civil and criminal cases. Among their client was Mighty Corporation, one of the largest cigarette manufacturers in the Philippines. By March 2019, Carpio opened a second branch of the law office in Cebu.

As of 2019, Carpio & Duterte Lawyers had yet to register with the Securities and Exchange Commission.

== Controversies ==
=== Smuggling allegations ===
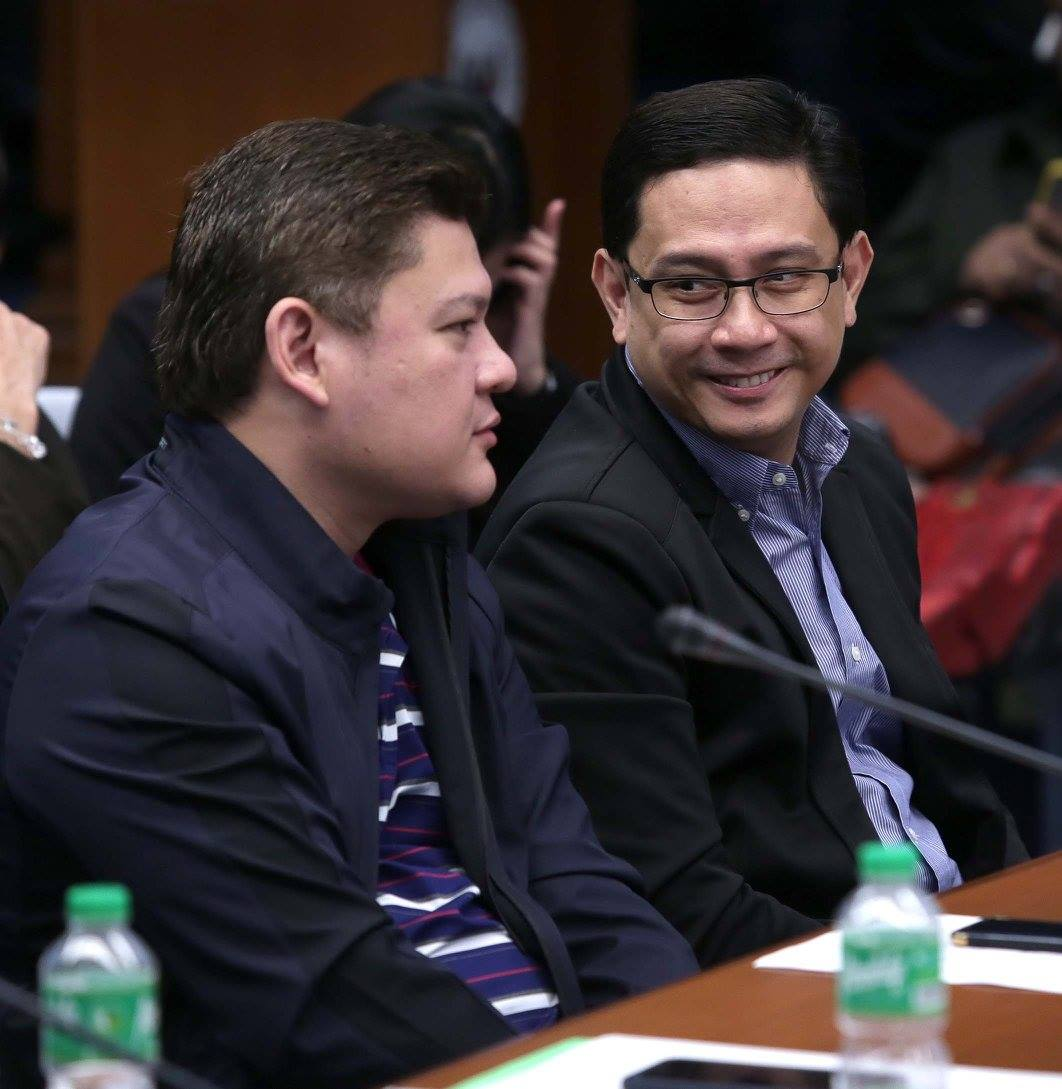
Carpio (right) and Paolo Duterte (left) during the Senate hearing on September 7, 2017.

In August 2017, Carpio was implicated by Senator Antonio Trillanes in the alleged smuggling at the Bureau of Customs. Trillanes raised some questions when Carpio visited the office of the Bureau of Customs numerous times and allegedly met with Customs Commissioner Nicanor Faeldon. Carpio's father-in-law, President Rodrigo Duterte, defended him by saying that it is his job to visit and defend his clients as a lawyer would normally do. Carpio dismissed the allegations of Trillanes, calling the latter as a "desperate rumormonger".

On July 31, 2024, Trillanes filed a drug and corruption complaint to the Department of Justice against Carpio, his brother-in-law and Davao City 1st District Rep. Paolo Duterte, and eight others.

=== AMLC disclosure of bank transactions ===
On April 22, 2026, the Anti-Money Laundering Council (AMLC) revealed to the House Committee on Justice that it had flagged 33 suspicious transactions registered through the combined bank accounts of Duterte and Carpio amounting to ₱6.77 billion from 2005 to January 2026; out of the transactions, ₱2.5 billion were inflows into Carpio's account and ₱343.3 million were outflows from the same account, while ₱791.1 million cannot be clearly classified based on the records. AMLC's report was presented during the House committee's hearings to confirm a probable cause for impeaching Vice President Duterte. On the same day, former senator Trillanes also claimed during the hearing that ₱111.63 million in transactions registered through Carpio and Duterte's joint bank account went undeclared in Vice President Duterte's statement of assets, liabilities, and net worth (SALN).

By April 27, Carpio filed a criminal complaint against AMLC Executive Director Ronel Buenaventura, the Bangko Sentral ng Pilipinas (BSP) Governor Eli Remolona Jr., and four members of Congress before the Quezon City Prosecutor's Office for allegedly violating the Bank Secrecy Law, the Anti-Money Laundering Act, and the Data Privacy Act. He later added Francis Edralin Lim, chairman of the Securities and Exchange Commission (SEC) chairman, and Reynaldo Regalado, commissioner of the Insurance Commission (IC), to his complaint on May 13.

Two days after filing the criminal complaint, Carpio filed a ₱7.3 million damages lawsuit against the impeachment complainants and Ramil Madriaga for allegedly propagating "perjurious lies" to harm his reputation.

== Personal life ==
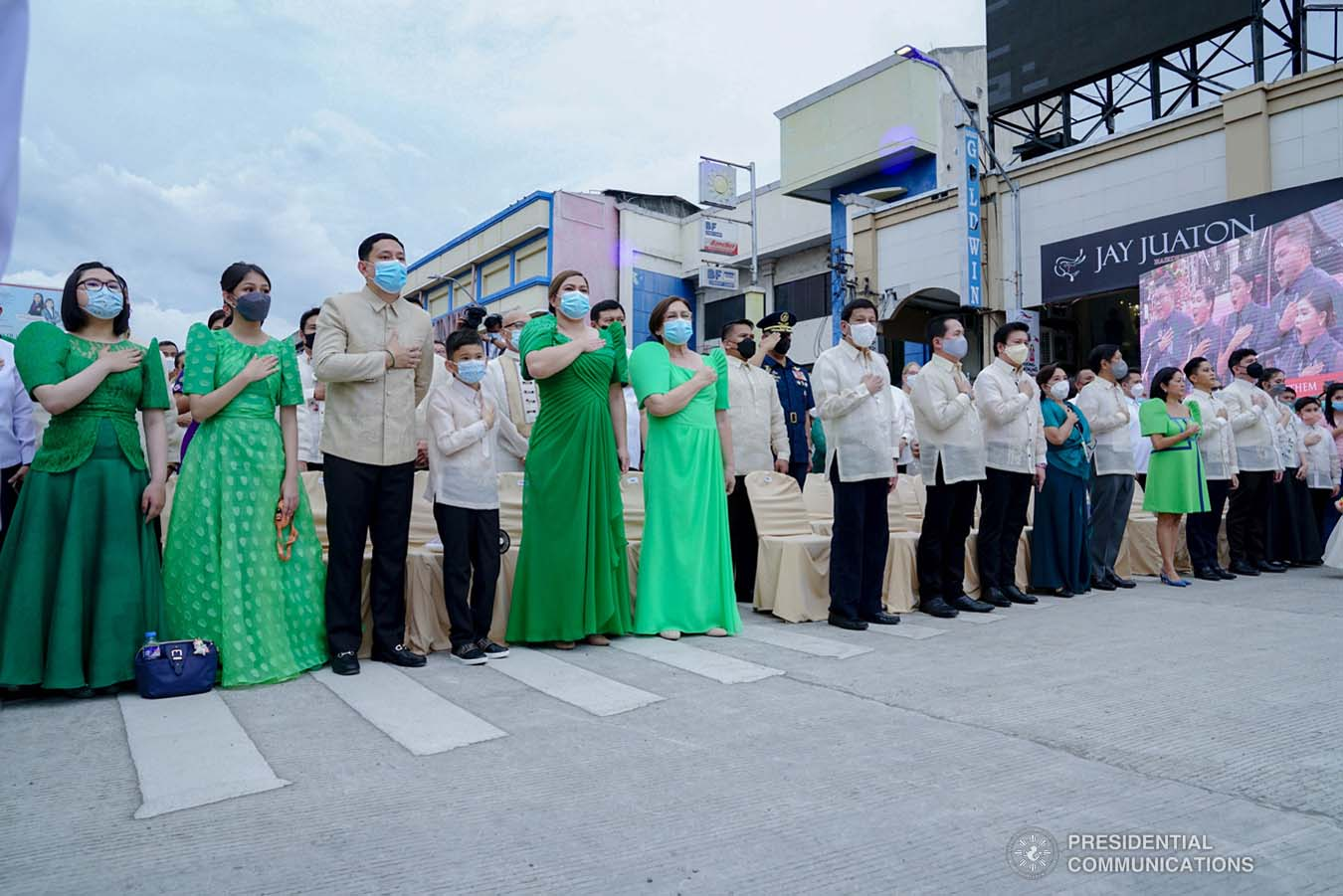
Carpio (third to the left) during the inauguration of his wife Vice President Sara Duterte on June 19, 2022.

Carpio met Sara Duterte while attending San Beda College (now San Beda University); they married at the Santuario de San Antonio in Forbes Park, Makati, on October 27, 2007. They have three children: an adopted daughter, Mikhaila Maria ("Sharky"; born March 7, 2008), and two biological sons, Mateo Lucas ("Stingray"; born April 1, 2013), and Marko Digong ("Stonefish"; born March 2, 2017). Duterte once issued a statement in mid-2024 mentioning that they had four children. Carpio has distanced himself and his children from public view even while his wife is a prominent politician, calling himself the "bantatay" (transl. guardian dad, a portmanteau of bantay and tatay) for their children while Duterte serves in office, and admitting that "we do not talk about politics" while at home. Most notably, they were not present during the proclamation of his wife as the duly elected Vice President of the Philippines at the House of Representatives, but they attended the inauguration of his wife on June 19, 2022, at Davao City. However, he actively campaigned and participated in some of the campaign sorties of his wife where he became a proxy and gave speeches to his wife's supporters.

Mans' paternal aunt is the former Ombudsman Conchita Carpio Morales and a cousin of his father is the former Supreme Court Senior Associate Justice Antonio Carpio, who is also widely known as a critic of his father-in-law's administration.

Mans is a member of Madayaw Lodge No. 403 along with his brother-in-law Paolo Duterte.
