= Padrino system =

Filipino cultural trait

The padrino system, or patronage in Filipino culture and politics, is a value system in which individuals gain favor, promotion, or political appointment through family affiliation (nepotism) or friendship (cronyism), rather than on the basis of merit. The system traces its origins to the Spanish colonial period, when Filipinos were often required to obtain the favor of a Spanish official or a wealthy Filipino, typically a friar, in order to secure a government position or improve their social or economic standing. At the center of this system is the padrino, a sponsor or influential backer who uses their power or connections to secure opportunities for others. The padrino system has also been a source of numerous controversies and is widely associated with corruption.

== In the executive ==
In the executive branch, the padrino system can be observed in the appointment of officials, where loyalty to the president's political party, supporters, or campaign contributors often plays a significant role. This practice has raised concerns about its impact on meritocracy and the professionalism of the civil service.

=== Cronies of Ferdinand Marcos ===
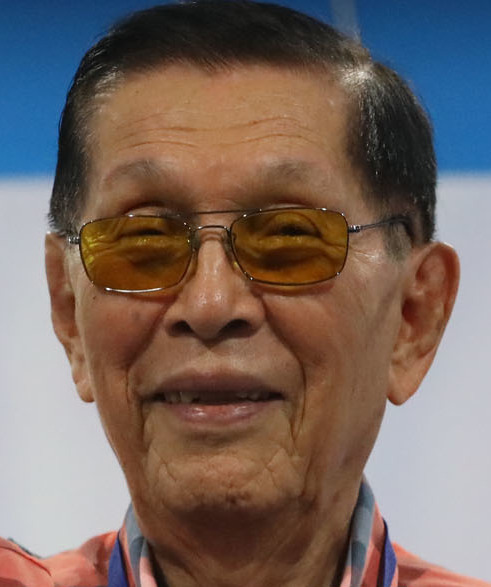
Juan Ponce Enrile

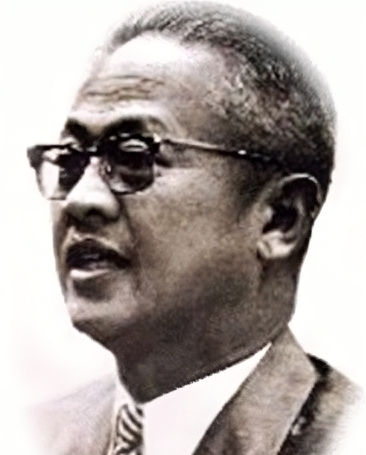
Roberto Benedicto

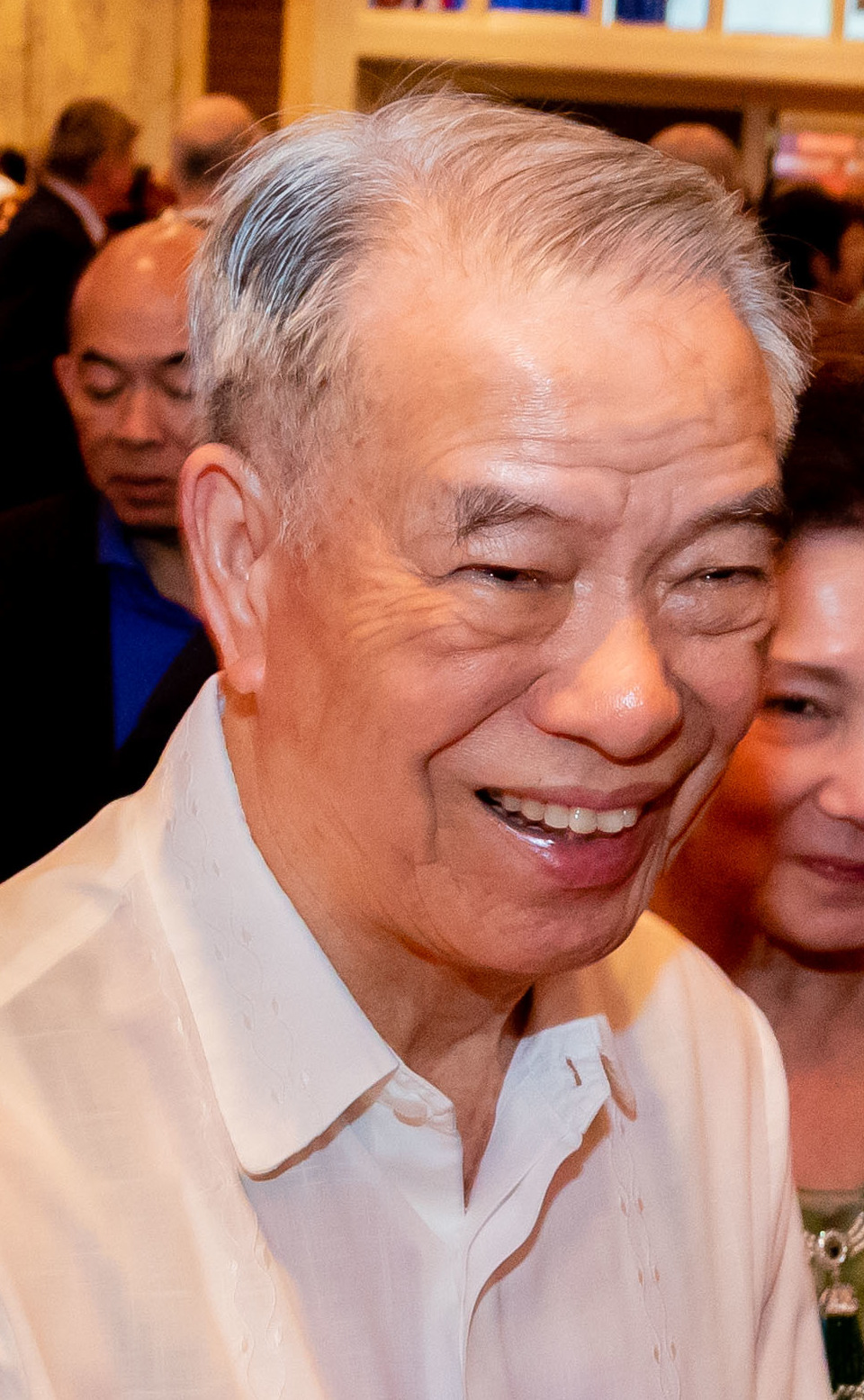
Lucio Tan

Certain associates of former Philippine President Ferdinand Marcos, historically referred to using the catchphrase "Marcos cronies", benefited from their friendship with Marcos – whether in terms of legal assistance, political favors, or facilitation of business monopolies, during his administration. Marcos critics, and the local and international press began referring to these individuals as "cronies" during the latter days of the Marcos dictatorship, and the Philippine government – especially the Presidential Commission on Good Government (PCGG) – continued using the term after the ouster of Marcos in 1986.

These "cronies" were awarded government commissions, projects, and funds, many of which were later investigated for corruption, misuse of funds, and disregard of the Constitution of the Philippines. Marcos' cronies were given strategic positions both in the government and in private sectors in order for the Marcoses to seize control of the major industries of the country.

== In the legislative ==
The Constitution of the Philippines, in many ways, laid down the foundations against nepotism, cronyism, and oligarchical rule of the few.

The issue of political dynasties has always been touched, especially during elections, but the subject has been much avoided by politicians alike who have a wife, son, daughter, or a relative sitting in office as well.

When the pork barrel scam broke out, Senator Jinggoy Estrada claimed that Pres. Benigno Aquino III used the Disbursement Acceleration Program to influence the 188 Congressional Representatives and 20 Senators to approve the impeachment complaint against Renato Corona. On July 2, 2014, the Supreme Court decision on DAP was ruled as unconstitutional.

== In the military ==
The Armed Forces of the Philippines (AFP) was known as one of the best in the post-World War geopolitical scene in Southeast Asia, if not the whole of Asia. The majority of the officers were graduates from the West Point-styled Philippine Military Academy.

In order to get a higher rank or office, one must have at least known or befriended a high-ranking official to be promoted.

== In society ==
=== Efforts to combat the padrino system ===
In September 2008, Senator Miriam Defensor-Santiago passed Senate Bill No. 2616, or the "Anti-Political Recommendation Act", however this as usual has been shelved for the time being and is currently pending at the Committee level. She once again urged its passage in 2013, in response to accounts of the so-called "three kings" of the Bureau of Customs being supported by influential backers – Carlos So (backed by Iglesia ni Cristo), Rogel Gatchalian (claimed to be an associate of then-Senate Minority Leader Juan Ponce Enrile), and Ricardo Belmonte (then-House Speaker Feliciano Belmonte Jr.'s soon-to-retire brother) – during that year.

Senatorial candidate Diosdado Valeroso, a former police chief superintendent, in Rappler's senatorial debate on April 22, 2016, proposed a meritocracy bill that would shield law enforcement agencies and government employees from political influence, most especially from the padrino system.

== See also ==
- Corruption in the Philippines
- Spoils system, 19th century American equivalent
