= Conrado M. Vasquez =

Filipino judge (1913–2006)

The Honorable Conrado M. Vasquez
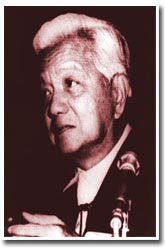

102nd Associate Justice of the Supreme Court of the Philippines
- In office May 14, 1982 – September 3, 1983
- Appointed by: Ferdinand Marcos
- Preceded by: Ramon C. Fernandez
- Succeeded by: Buenaventura S. De la Fuente

1st Ombudsman of the Philippines
- In office May 12, 1988 – May 12, 1995
- President: Corazon Aquino; Fidel V. Ramos
- Preceded by: Position established
- Succeeded by: Aniano A. Desierto

Personal details
- Born: September 3, 1913 Biñan, Laguna, Philippine Islands
- Died: September 19, 2006 (aged 93)

Conrado M. Vasquez (September 3, 1913 – September 19, 2006) was the first Ombudsman of the Philippines and an Associate Justice of the Supreme Court of the Philippines.

== Early career ==
Vasquez earned his law degree from the University of the Philippines, graduating valedictorian of his class in 1937. After a brief stint in private practice, he first joined the government service as a lawyer with the Department of Justice. Beginning in 1954, he would serve as a trial court judge in Batangas and Manila until his elevation to the Court of Appeals in 1973. During that time, Vasquez would also teach law in several Manila law schools.

== Associate Justice, then Ombudsman ==
At the age of 68, Vasquez was appointed by President Ferdinand Marcos as an Associate Justice of the Supreme Court of the Philippines on May 14, 1982. He served on the Court for less than two years and was obliged to retire upon reaching the mandatory retirement age of 70 on September 3, 1983.

== Retirement ==
Vasquez was taken out of retirement from government service during the term of President Corazon Aquino. The 1987 Constitution had created the Office of the Ombudsman with jurisdiction in the investigation and discipline of public officials and government employees. In May 1988, President Aquino appointed the 74-year-old Vasquez because of the Zaldivar doctrine of the Supreme Court. He would serve out the full 7-year term, finally retiring from public life in 1995. His daughter Leonora, served in the executive branch under various capacities during the administrations of Presidents Fidel Ramos and Joseph Estrada.

== Death ==
Vasquez died on September 19, 2006, sixteen days after his 93rd birthday. At the time of his death, he was the oldest surviving former Justice of the Supreme Court.

== Awards ==
The Philippines:

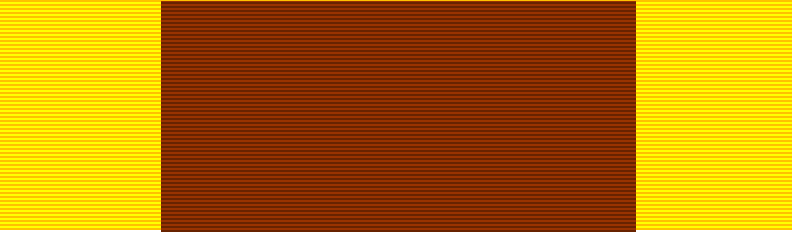
- Supreme Commander and Knight of the Order of the Knights of Rizal.

Preceded by Ramon C. Fernandez	Associate Justice of the Supreme Court of the Philippines; 1982–1983	Succeeded by Buenaventura S. De la Fuente
Preceded by Post Created	Ombudsman of the Republic of the Philippines; 1988–1995	Succeeded by Aniano A. Desierto
