= Simeon V. Marcelo =

Filipino lawyer

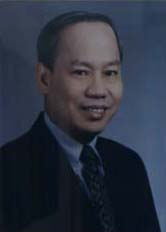

3rd Ombudsman of the Philippines
- In office October 10, 2002 – December 1, 2005
- President: Gloria Macapagal Arroyo
- Preceded by: Aniano A. Desierto
- Succeeded by: Merceditas Gutierrez

Solicitor General of the Philippines
- In office February 16, 2001 – May 13, 2002
- President: Gloria Macapagal Arroyo
- Preceded by: Ricardo P. Galvez
- Succeeded by: Carlos N. Ortega

Personal details
- Born: October 21, 1953 (age 72) Santa Rosa Nueva Ecija, Philippines
- Education: University of the Philippines College of Law; Ateneo de Manila University
- Profession: Lawyer

Simeon V. Marcelo (born October 21, 1953) is a Filipino lawyer and was the third Ombudsman of the Philippines. As Ombudsman, he investigated government officials, including members of the police and the military, who were suspected of committing graft and corruption. He served as the principal private prosecutor in the impeachment case (and as head public prosecutor in the subsequent criminal prosecution for plunder) of former President Joseph Estrada, the 13th President of the Republic of the Philippines. After 3 years as Ombudsman, he resigned due to health problems. He was replaced by Ma. Merceditas N. Gutierrez.

Prior to being the Ombudsman, he was appointed head of the Office of the Solicitor General of the Philippines, representing the Government of the Philippines, its agencies and instrumentalists and its officials and agents in any litigation, proceeding, investigation or matter requiring the services of a lawyer, replacing Justice Ricardo Galvez. Thereafter, Justice Alfredo Benipayo was appointed as his replacement.

== Education ==
Marcelo took his undergraduate degree at the Ateneo de Manila University where he finished his Bachelor of Arts in Philosophy with honors. He then took up and finished his Bachelor of Laws at the University of the Philippines College of Law and was among the top ten of the graduating class of 1979. He later placed fifth (with a rating of 89.9%) in the 1979 Philippine Bar Examination. As a law student, he was the recipient of the Crispin Llamado Scholarship Award. He also became a member of academic organizations such as the Pi Gamma Mu International Social Science Honor Society and the Order of the Purple Feather Honor Society. (Philippines Graphic, 15 October 2007, at page 24)

== As a litigation lawyer ==
Prior to joining the government, Marcelo was a senior partner and head of the litigation department of then Carpio Villaraza & Cruz Law Offices. As head litigator, Marcelo represented several notable clients. One wealthy former client was property owner Henry Sy, who, in 1993, was threatened with a takeover bid by fellow shareholders in SM Megamall. Marcelo came up against lawyer Estelito Mendoza, who notably represented former then-President Joseph Estrada during Estrada's 2001 impeachment proceedings. This was Marcelo's second legal encounter with Mendoza, the first coming in 1983, when Marcelo helped secure a temporary restraining order for the government to open a textile mill shut down due to suspected smuggling, eventually facing off against then-Solicitor General Mendoza.

== Impeachment of President Estrada ==
Marcelo first attained national prominence in 2000 during the Senate impeachment trial of then President Joseph Estrada. As the selected lead private trial prosecutor in the first impeachment proceedings against a sitting president, Marcelo presented the prosecution's star witness, Ilocos Sur Gov Luis "Chavit" Singson.

Singson took the witness stand on 13–15 December 2000. The Philippine Daily Inquirer published "House prosecution panel get a big favor", which read:

“Whoever suggested the engagement of the services of lawyer Simeon Marcelo to conduct the direct examination of Ilocos Sur Gov. Luis Singson in yesterday’s hearing did the prosecution a favor. So far, Marcelo appears to be doing the job. He has guided Singson through the maze of transactions he allegedly undertook for the benefit of President Estrada without inviting objections from the defense lawyers.

“Marcelo’s expertise in trial work showed in the case by which he matched the questions with the entries in the ledgers and checks presented to the impeachment court to get the desired answers. He was effective in the use of clear and easy-to-understand Filipino in the conduct of the direct examination. Not only did the use of the native language put Singson at ease in answering his questions, he was able to communicate directly to the part of the radio and TV audience who are not fluent in the English language.” (14 December 2000 issue)

The impeachment proceeding was not completed and there was no resolution of the charges against then President Estrada. During the 16 January 2001 session, a closed envelope that the pro-Estrada Senators (who composed the majority of the Senate) refused to open prompted the prosecution to walk out of the halls of the Senate. The walk-out triggered massive protest rallies known as the Second EDSA Revolution.

== Trial of Joseph Estrada ==
On 9 February 2001, President Gloria Macapagal Arroyo appointed Marcelo to head the Office of the Solicitor General. He was appointed as Ombudsman in October 2002. At the age of 49, he became the youngest lawyer ever appointed to this position.

Marcelo was the head of the prosecution panel in the very first criminal prosecution and conviction of a former president. In what is widely acclaimed as the “Trial of the Century”, then Solicitor General Marcelo, who was deputized in April 2001 by then Ombudsman Aniano Desierto as one of the principal prosecutors, initially acted as the “de facto” head of the legal panel that was in charge of prosecuting former President Joseph Estrada for plunder at the Sandiganbayan. He later became the official head of the legal panel when he was appointed Ombudsman in October 2002.

As head of the prosecution team, Marcelo presented three "star" witnesses, namely: Gov. Luis “Chavit” Singson, Clarissa Ocampo and Manuel Curato, of the prosecution.

When he left government service for health reasons in November 2005, Marcelo continued to serve as the “de facto” head of the legal panel that was prosecuting former President Estrada. A month after the effective date (30 November 2005) of his resignation as Ombudsman, he started reviewing all the records, including the transcripts of stenographic notes, of the case and personally drafted the final memorandum for the prosecution for submission to the Sandiganbayan. Further, he, together with the other members of the legal panel, advised then Special Prosecutor Dennis Villa-Ignacio on the cross-examination of the defense witnesses, particularly accused former President Estrada.

On 12 September 2007, after six years of trial, the Sandiganbayan convicted former President Estrada for plunder and sentenced him to reclusion perpetua.

== As Solicitor General ==
Marcelo was appointed Solicitor General in February 2001. During his term, he successfully handled before the Supreme Court the recovery of Ferdinand Marcos’ ill-gotten wealth worth over US$680 million. (To date, this is one of the biggest recovery of stolen assets from a corrupt government official worldwide; also, the Supreme Court judgement constituted the first final ruling that the Marcoses had acquired ill-gotten wealth during the late dictator’s regime.) Then Solicitor General Marcelo also successfully handled before the Supreme Court such cases as the constitutionality of the Plunder Law, the revival of the prosecution of senior police officers (including one who is now a member of the Senate) involving the extrajudicial killing of a gang of suspected criminals, the recovery of shares of stock and dividends worth P70 billion in connection with the coconut levy cases and the recovery of stock-holdings worth P26 billion from the family of one of the late dictator’s cronies. (Prior to his assumption of office as Solicitor General in 2001, the Government was able to recover only P26 billion since 1986 from the Marcoses and their cronies.) By far, he is considered to be one of the most successful Solicitors General ever appointed, having won all of the major cases during his term in office.

== As Ombudsman ==
In October 2002, he was appointed as Ombudsman. At the age of 49 years, he became the youngest appointee. As Ombudsman, his efforts in battling graft and corruption earned him local and international recognition. Although faced with severe lack of resources, with an operating budget of P350 Million compared to the 2013 budget of the Office of the Ombudsman in the amount of P1.7 billion, he still led a serious and effective crusade against corruption, earning him praises from both foreign and local media, including The Washington Post (p. A14, 10 June 2005), which stated that Marcelo "restored credibility to that organization" (referring to the Office of the Ombudsman).

As Ombudsman, Marcelo led the legal team which successfully prosecuted and secured the conviction of former President Joseph Estrada for plunder. Further, he actively supervised the prosecution of other major high-profile cases before the Sandiganbayan such as the President Diosdado Macapagal Boulevard case, the RSBS Pension Fund cases, the DPWH Repair Scam cases and the Major General Carlos F. Garcia cases.

During his three-year tenure as Ombudsman, upon assuming office, he immediately targeted "the most corrupt agencies, daring to prosecute even members of the historically untouchable military." (p. A14, The Washington Post, 10 June 2005)

Marcelo also investigated and prosecuted included an active major general, several active and recently retired generals and a former chief of staff of the armed forces. He also investigated and prosecuted senior officials of the reputedly most corrupt government agencies, namely: Bureau of Customs, Bureau of Internal Revenue and Department of Public Works and Highways.

On 30 November 2005, due to serious health concerns, principally caused by his one-hundred-hour workweek, Marcelo left government service.

Juan Mercado, a columnist based in Manila, made the following comments about Marcelo’s resignation: "Men of talent, vision and rock-hard integrity are the rarest of resources. That is especially true for nations, like the Philippines, where tainted 'leaders' handcuff us to treadmill crises."

Exasperated by political infighting, George Washington wrote: ‘Few have the virtue to withstand the highest bidder.’ Simeon Marcelo had what it took. International and local observers agree on that.

Street yokels, like us, got a first close look at this 1979 topnotcher during the Estrada impeachment trial.

People liked what they saw then: a talented comer without guile. In Adlai Stevenson’s words, he could ‘lead a cavalry charge without feeling funny astride a horse.’”

The Philippine Human Development Report 2008/2009 succinctly described the performance of the Office of the Ombudsman from its establishment in 1989 under Ombudsman Conrado Vasquez up to the present under Ombudsman Merceditas Gutierrez:

Table 1.16 SWS rating of the sincerity of the OMB in fighting corruption (2000-2008)

Year	Net Sincerity Rating	Ombudsman
2000	-5	Aniano Desierto
2001	+7	Aniano Desierto
2002	n.a.	Simeon Marcelo
2003	+21	Simeon Marcelo
2004	+28	Simeon Marcelo
2005	+22	Simeon Marcelo
2006	+6	Merceditas Gutierrez
2007	+9	Merceditas Gutierrez
2008	+4	Merceditas Gutierrez

Ratings in 2003-2005 correspond to “moderate” sincerity and in 2006-2008, “mediocre” sincerity.

Source: Transparency and Accountability Network [2009]

Insiders have attributed the OMB's inefficiency in the late 1980s and 1990s to a management system, installed by then Ombudsman Conrado Vasquez, that rewarded the fulfillment of quotas, regardless of total workload or complexity of cases, rather than the expeditious disposition of cases [Balgos, 1998]. The system was quite easily abused by prosecutors who would finish easier cases first, meet quotas, and leave the more complex or uninteresting ones untouched for months or years.

Collecting evidence was also a problem. While mandated to investigate, the OMB's Fact-Finding and Intelligence Bureau (FFIB) actually depended heavily on the National Bureau of Investigation (NBI)- in one case waiting seven years for their findings - and the COA. By the end of 1994, the OMB had a backlog of more than 14,500 cases, representing 65 percent of its total workload.

The improvement in public perception of the OMB (during the time of Ombudsman Marcelo) from 2002 to 2005 (notwithstanding law disposition rates) is also attributed to key institutional changes. Among these are the recognition of the importance of, and strengthening of, the Office of the Special Prosecutor (OSP) and Field Investigation Office (FIO) through training and recruitment; the delegation of powers to deputy Ombudsmen and the reengineering of other internal procedures to improve efficiency; and the strengthening of partnerships to fight corruption such as through the celebrated Solana Covenant among the OMB, the COA, and the CSC that outlined a more coordinated approach to fighting corruption. Relations with other partner organizations in the fight against corruption-the Presidential Anti-Graft Commission (PAGC) and civil society organizations such as the Transparency and Accountability Network (TAN) were also nurtured and criticism welcomed.

Apart from improved credibility, gains from these reforms were seen in immediate increases in the conviction rate-computed as the number of cases resulting in convictions, including guilty pleas, over the number of decided cases by the Sandiganbayan-from mere 6 percent to 14 percent. This trend spilled over to the next administration until 2007 when it reached 55 percent.

Conviction rates have since decreased sharply, however, falling dramatically to 14.4 percent by the first semester of 2008, with rates as low as 5 percent in March, 3 percent in May, and zero percent in June. Performance and trust have been further undermined by the OMB's action- or inaction- on high-profile cases. These include the P2 billion purchase of automated counting machines by the Commission on Elections (COMELEC) from Mega Pacific for the 2004 national elections, the $2 million bribery case involving former Justice Secretary Hernando Perez, the P728 million fertilizer fund scam, and the multi-million dollar NBN-ZTE deal.

The first was inexplicably resolved with two conflicting resolutions-one finding liability of at least one senior Comelec official (June 2006) and another finding no one liable (September 2006). This was in stark contrast to a Supreme Court decision on a case filed separately by private citizens: the High Tribunal found the contract null and void with the attendant procurement irregularities.

The second-involving Perez, the former boss of incumbent Ombudsman Merceditas Gutierrez, was said to be deliberately defective. A two-year wait in the filing of the case resulted in its dismissal due to technical lapses. Investigation findings and resolutions on the third and fourth cases, brought before the OMB in June 2004 and August 2007, respectively, have yet to be issued.

Not surprisingly, observers attributed the slide in performance and credibility to the undoing by the incumbent Ombudsman of the very institutional reforms that had previously strengthened the organization. Decisions have been recentralized, including cases pending with the Deputy Ombudsmen for Luzon, Visayas, and Mindanao involving governors and vice-governors. Relations with the OSP have become strained. The latter is accompanied by a 'no hire' policy, despite 36 percent of prosecutorial positions being vacant, and overt distrust as manifested by the requirement that OSP subordinates report directly to the incumbent Ombudsman weekly.

Most unfortunate for the fight against corruption on the macro level is the deactivation of the Inter-Agency Anti-Graft Coordinating Council(IAGC), which was composed of the OMB, the COA, and the CSC. As chair, the OMB simply did not convene the council. The incumbent Ombudsman also cut off relations with CSOs critical of her agency.

x x x x

Open voting in the JBC will be a significant step in strengthening the independence of the judiciary and the OMB and, thus, the quality of enforcement of public accountability. Beyond this, the JBC could itself design and adopt an independent search mechanism for qualified candidates that would do away with (or at least explicitly circumscribe) the influence of recommendations from politicians.

Anecdotal precedents exist in different contexts. During the term of Comelec Chair Christian S. Monsod (1991-1995), for instance, it was explicitly announce that contrary to past practice, endorsements from national or local elected officials or political party members would penalize rather than strengthen personnel applications for election officers and other staff positions, for obvious conflict of interest reasons. Former Ombudsman Simeon Marcelo (2002-2005) also instituted an analogous practice, stringently screening personnel applicants and conducting thorough background (integrity) investigations. It is no coincidence that the credibility and performance of Comelec and Ombudsman peaked during the incumbency of these two officials.

After his resignation, Marcelo then took a sabbatical in 2006. In 2007, working only part-time, he became a Professor of Evidence and a member of the Board of Trustees of Arellano University Law School and served as the executive secretary of the Asian Development Bank Administrative Tribunal.

In an article that appeared in the Philippine Daily Inquirer, Marcelo was described as follows: "Marcelo served as a widely admired Ombudsman, with a solid reputation for incorruptibility." (at p. 1, 24 May 2009)

In 2013, in recognition of his outstanding contribution to the country, Marcelo was given the University of the Philippines Alumni Association (UPAA) Distinguished Alumnus Award for Public Service.

== As law partner and advocate ==
In January 2008, he returned to private practice by joining his former law firm and became a name partner of the Villaraza Cruz Marcelo & Angangco Law Offices. Commenting on his return to his old law firm, The Philippine Starweek, the most circulated Philippine Sunday magazine, on its 17 February 2008 issue, stated that Atty. Marcelo is “acknowledged as perhaps the country’s best litigator.” (p. 5) This reputation of Atty. Marcelo was further enhanced when he led the legal team that represented the Lopez Management during last year's bitterly fought annual stockholders’ election of directors of Manila Electric Company (Meralco), the country biggest utility company. As a result of decisive legal victories at the Court of Appeals and the Supreme Court by Marcelo and his legal team, the Management was able to thwart the attempted take-over of Meralco by the Government Service Insurance System, suspected by many as actually acting on behalf of San Miguel Corporation, headed by a close friend and extremely close political ally of the Presidential couple.

In 2009, the Bangko Sentral ng Pilipinas (Central Bank of the Philippines) appointed Marcelo to prosecute the owner and officers of the Legacy group in the biggest bank fraud case in the country's history. At present, his team of trial lawyers and prosecuting those guilty of the scam for the crime of syndicated estafa, on non-bailable offense, in several trial courts in the country.

Also in 2009, Marcelo led his team of tax litigation experts in representing one of the country's leading companies in a P7-billion tax collection suit. A favorable decision was rendered in 2013 by the Third Division of the Court of Tax Appeals. (The Decision was appealed by the Office of the Solicitor General to the Court of Tax Appeals En Banc and is now submitted for resolution.) Also, he and his team secured in 2014 a significant legal victory in the Supreme Court in a multi-billion case. Further, he and his tax team secured last year a Suspension Order from the Court of Tax Appeals to stop the Bureau of Internal Revenue from proceeding with the collection of tax assessments involving hundreds of millions of pesos against one of the clients of their law firm.

Aside from being a successful litigator in both private and public arenas, he also served, prior to joining the government in 2001, as the chair of the Integrated Bar of the Philippines’ National Committee on Legal Aid and was head of its Task Force on Child Abuse, as well as the executive editor of its Law Journal. Among the cases handled by the Integrated Bar of the Philippines during Marcelo's incumbency as chair of its National Committee on Legal Aid is the Marikina rape-slay case. Marcelo and a team of trial lawyers from his law office helped the Department of Justice prosecutors to reverse the acquittal of the accused rapists and to order a new trial. (Because of the constitutional prohibition against double jeopardy, it is next-to-impossible to reverse an acquittal in a criminal case.) The Court of Appeals nullified the acquittal of the accused on the ground that the prosecution was not accorded due process by the judge during the trial of the case. The Supreme Court later upheld this ruling.

During the new trial, the same team of lawyers, headed by Marcelo, helped in the prosecution by securing key evidence such as the testimony of television reporter Gus Abelgas, before whom some of the accused confessed their commission of the crime while being interviewed on camera. They also convinced an eyewitness, who did not testify during the first trial out of fear, to testify during the new trial. They also interviewed key witnesses who testified in the prior trial in preparation for the new trial, did the research and drafted all necessary pleadings for the public prosecutors. At the end of the new trial, the trial court rendered a verdict of guilt against all accused.

At present, he is involved as legal counsel in numerous high-profile cases in regional trial courts, the Court of Appeals and the Supreme Court, apart being actively involved in the good governance and anti-corruption movement in the country.

Marcelo is now a name partner of the Cruz Marcelo & Tenefrancia Law Offices.

== Affiliations ==
On 19 September 2008, Marcelo was appointed as one of the four members of the World Bank's new Independent Advisory Board (IAB), which provides advice on good governance and anti-corruption measures to the World Bank president, Audit Committee and Department of Integrity. In March 2009, the Asia Foundation engaged his services as an International Anti-Corruption Consultant to assist in the good governance and anti-corruption projects of the Mongolian Government. He served as the executive secretary of the Administrative Tribunal of the Asian Development Bank from 2007 to 2010. After serving since 2007 as a director and first vice-president of the Philippine Bar Association, the country's oldest and largest voluntary organization of lawyers, Marcelo served as its president from 2009 to 2010.

Marcelo also once served as a USAID consultant for anti-corruption and good governance in relation to its project to strengthen the Sandiganbayan and the Office of the Ombudsman.

== See also ==
- Philippine Ombudsman

== Notes ==
Legal offices
Preceded by Ricardo P. Galvez	Solicitor General of the Philippines; 2001–2002	Succeeded by Carlos N. Ortega
Government offices
Preceded by Aniano A. Desierto	Ombudsman of the Philippines; 2002–2005	Succeeded by Ma. Merceditas N. Gutierrez
