= Disbursement Acceleration Program =

The Disbursement Acceleration Program in the Philippines is a "special" budget allocated to accelerate or hasten a government project without Congress or Senate's approval. This replaces the traditional pork barrel, the Priority Development Assistance Fund (PDAF), after the Pork barrel scam was uncovered in 2013.

== History ==
During President Benigno Aquino III's term, he instituted budget reforms, as opposed to Gloria Macapagal Arroyo's style of spending funds. Due to the reforms, he reduced funds in some, added a little in some, and the rest is reserved for emergencies like disasters and crisis management and foreign debts and deficits. The consequence is a lot of funds unspent, slower fund release and sometimes, underspent funds were returned to the National Treasury. In order to solve the problem, the President, along with his budget secretary and fellow Liberal party member Florencio Abad, instituted a program that accelerates fund spending in all public works and agencies badly needing funds.

=== Discontinuation ===
The Supreme Court ruled that the DAP, along with the Pork Barrel, are unconstitutional and must be discontinued.
