= Office of the Ombudsman (Philippines) =

Constitutional body in the Philippines

- Tanggapan ng Tanodbayan
- Seal

Agency overview
- Formed: May 12, 1988; 38 years ago
- Jurisdiction: Philippines
- Headquarters: Senator Miriam P. Defensor-Santiago Avenue, Quezon City, Philippines
- Employees: 1,212 (2024)
- Annual budget: ₱4.05 billion (2020)
- Agency executive: Jesus Crispin C. Remulla, Ombudsman
- Website: www.ombudsman.gov.ph

Building in Quezon City housing the Office of the Ombudsman

The Office of the Ombudsman (OMB; Filipino: Tanggapan ng Tanodbayan) is a constitutional body established under the Constitution of the Philippines, tasked with investigating and prosecuting government officials accused of crimes, particularly those involving graft and corruption.

Jesus Crispin Remulla, the 58th secretary of justice, has been serving as the 7th Ombudsman of the Philippines since 2025, following his appointment by President Bongbong Marcos.

== Functions ==
Under the 1987 Philippine Constitution and the Ombudsman Act of 1989, the Office of the Ombudsman independently monitors all three branches of the government for political corruption. The ombudsman "is principally tasked to investigate on its own or upon complaint by any person, in any form or manner, any act or omission of any public officer or employee, including those in government-owned or controlled corporations, which appears to be illegal, unjust, improper or inefficient." After an investigation, the ombudsman files charges at the Sandiganbayan, a special anti-graft court.

The Offices of the Ombudsman includes the ombudsman's own office, along with offices for a team composed of a sheriff, the ombudsman's second in command, and six other deputies who lead their respective divisions or bureaus.

== History ==
The Office of the Ombudsman predates the 1987 Constitution. There have been several offices established under various presidents of the Philippines whose duties are now subsumed under the Office of the Ombudsman:

- Integrity Board (Elpidio Quirino, established 1950)
- Presidential Complaints and Action Commission (Ramon Magsaysay, established 1957)
- Presidential Committee on Administration Performance Efficiency (Carlos P. Garcia, established 1958)
- Presidential Anti-Graft Committee (Diosdado Macapagal, established 1962)
- Presidential Agency on Reform and Government Operations (Ferdinand Marcos, established 1966)

In 1969, the Office of the Citizens Counselor was created by the Republic Act No. 6028. It was primarily designed to conduct fact-finding investigations and make recommendations to Congress and the President. The office was "not at all implemented." Subsequently, Marcos created the Complaints and Investigation Office in 1970 and the Presidential Administrative Assistance Committee in 1971. None of these were successful nor were independent.

In the martial law-era 1973 Philippine Constitution (Sections 5 and 6, Article XIII), provided for the establishment of a special court called the Sandiganbayan and an office of the ombudsman called the tanodbayan. On June 11, 1978, during martial law, then President Ferdinand Marcos created by presidential decree the office of the Tanodbayan. The Tanodbayan was not independent but served at the pleasure of the president and could be removed at any time.

After Marcos was overthrown in the 1986 People Power Revolution, President Corazon Aquino issued two executive orders (nos. 243 and 244) in July 1987 that dictated a new Office of the Ombudsman and transformed the Tanodbayan into the Office of the Special Prosecutor under the ombudsman. Following the passage of the 1987 Constitution, the Ombudsman Act of 1989 was passed to define the roles and structure of the Office.

In March 2011, President Benigno Aquino III ordered the dismissal of Emilio Gonzales III as deputy ombudsman for military and other law enforcement officers for neglecting to properly handle the complaint filed by policeman Rolando Mendoza prior to the Manila hostage crisis in 2010. In September 2012, Gonzales was ordered reinstated by the Supreme Court, which argued among others that he did not commit an offense that could be considered "intentional wrongdoing[...] amounting to betrayal of public trust". By January 2014, the Supreme Court ruled the president's dismissal of a deputy ombudsman to be unconstitutional as it violates the independence of the Office of the Ombudsman provided by the Constitution.

In 2016, Overall Deputy Ombudsman Melchor Arthur Carandang began investigating a plunder complaint filed by Senator Antonio Trillanes regarding the allegedly questionable bank accounts of President Rodrigo Duterte and his family from 2006 to 2016. By July 2018, Carandang was ordered dismissed from office by Executive Secretary Salvador Medialdea for allegedly committing graft, corruption and betrayal of public trust in issuing statements about the Duterte family's bank records. In spite of Carandang's appeal, as well as criticism from observers that Medialdea's order violates the Supreme Court ruling from 2014 regarding the independence of the agency, the dismissal order was enforced on June 17, 2019; Duterte later appointed procurement director Warren Rex Liong of the Department of Budget and Management as ODO in November 2020.

In August 2023, a special panel of investigators at the Ombudsman recommended that Liong be charged with three counts of graft for his alleged involvement in the Pharmally scandal that was uncovered in 2021.

In Del Socorro v. Office of the Deputy Ombudsman for Luzon (G.R. Nos. 253361 et al., April 22, 2026), the Supreme Court of the Philippines En Banc established a landmark precedent affirming the independent investigatory authority of the Office of the Ombudsman. Authoring the decision, Associate Justice Maria Filomena Singh ruled that the Ombudsman possesses full constitutional power to conduct criminal and administrative investigations into public misconduct without waiting for a final audit report or notice of disallowance from the Commission on Audit (COA). The case stemmed from administrative dismissals involving municipal officials in Palawan linked to the alleged misuse of Malampaya Fund allocations, where the petitioners argued that the graft probe was premature due to pending COA reassessments. Rejecting this defense, the High Court held that the Ombudsman and COA perform distinct, non-contingent constitutional functions, emphasizing that requiring prior COA approval would severely undermine the Ombudsman’s mandate to hold public officers accountable.

== Officials ==
The ombudsman and its subordinates are appointed by the president of the Philippines from a list submitted by the Judicial and Bar Council for a non-renewable seven-year term. The ombudsman can be removed from office only through impeachment.

Photo	Name	Position
	Jesus Crispin Remulla	Ombudsman
	Dante Vargas (Officer-in-Charge)	Overall Deputy Ombudsman
	Vacant	Deputy Ombudsman for Luzon
	Dante Vargas	Deputy Ombudsman for Visayas
	Anderson Lo	Deputy Ombudsman for Mindanao
	Jose Balmeo Jr.	Deputy Ombudsman for Military and Other Law Enforcement Offices
	Mariflor Punzalan-Castillo	Special Prosecutor

== List of ombudsmen ==
#	Image	Ombudsman	Term	Appointing President	Post held prior to appointment
1		Conrado M. Vasquez (1988-1995)	May 12, 1988 – May 12, 1995 (7 years, 0 days)	Corazon Aquino	Supreme Court Associate Justice (1982–1983)
—		Francisco Villa; Officer-in-charge	May 19, 1995 – August 4, 1995 (77 days)	Fidel V. Ramos	Overall Deputy Ombudsman (1992)
2		Aniano A. Desierto (born 1935)	August 4, 1995 – August 4, 2002 (7 years, 0 days)	Fidel V. Ramos	Special Prosecutor (1991–1995)
—		Margarito Gervacio; Acting	August 4, 2002 – October 10, 2002 (67 days)	Gloria Macapagal Arroyo	Overall Deputy Ombudsman (1999)
3		Simeon V. Marcelo (born 1953)	October 10, 2002 – December 1, 2005 (Note: Resigned) (3 years, 52 days)	Gloria Macapagal Arroyo	Solicitor General (2001–2002)
4		Merceditas Gutierrez (born 1948)	December 1, 2005 – May 6, 2011 (5 years, 156 days)	Gloria Macapagal Arroyo	Justice Secretary (2002–2003, 2003–2004)
—		Orlando Casimiro; Acting	May 6, 2011 – July 28, 2011 (82 days)	Benigno Aquino III	Overall Deputy Ombudsman
5		Conchita Carpio-Morales (born 1941)	July 26, 2011 – July 26, 2018 (7 years, 0 days)	Benigno Aquino III	Supreme Court Associate Justice (2002–2011)
6		Samuel Martires (born 1949)	August 6, 2018 – July 27, 2025 (6 years, 355 days)	Rodrigo Duterte	Supreme Court Associate Justice (2017–2018)
—		Mariflor Punzalan-Castillo; Officer-in-charge	July 28, 2025 – August 27, 2025 (30 days)	Bongbong Marcos	Special Prosecutor (2024–2025)
—		Dante Vargas; Officer-in-charge	August 27, 2025 – October 9, 2025 (41 days)	Bongbong Marcos	Deputy Ombudsman (2022–2025)
7		Jesus Crispin Remulla (born 1961)	October 9, 2025 – present (1 year, 32 days)	Bongbong Marcos	Justice Secretary (2022–2025)

== See also ==
- Political history of the Philippines
- Vice President of the Philippines
- Supreme Court of the Philippines
- President of the Philippines
- House of Representatives of the Philippines
- Senate of the Philippines
- Constitution of the Philippines
- Congress of the Philippines
- Executive Departments of the Philippines
