= Conchita Carpio-Morales =

Filipino judge (born 1941)

The Honorable Conchita Carpio-Morales
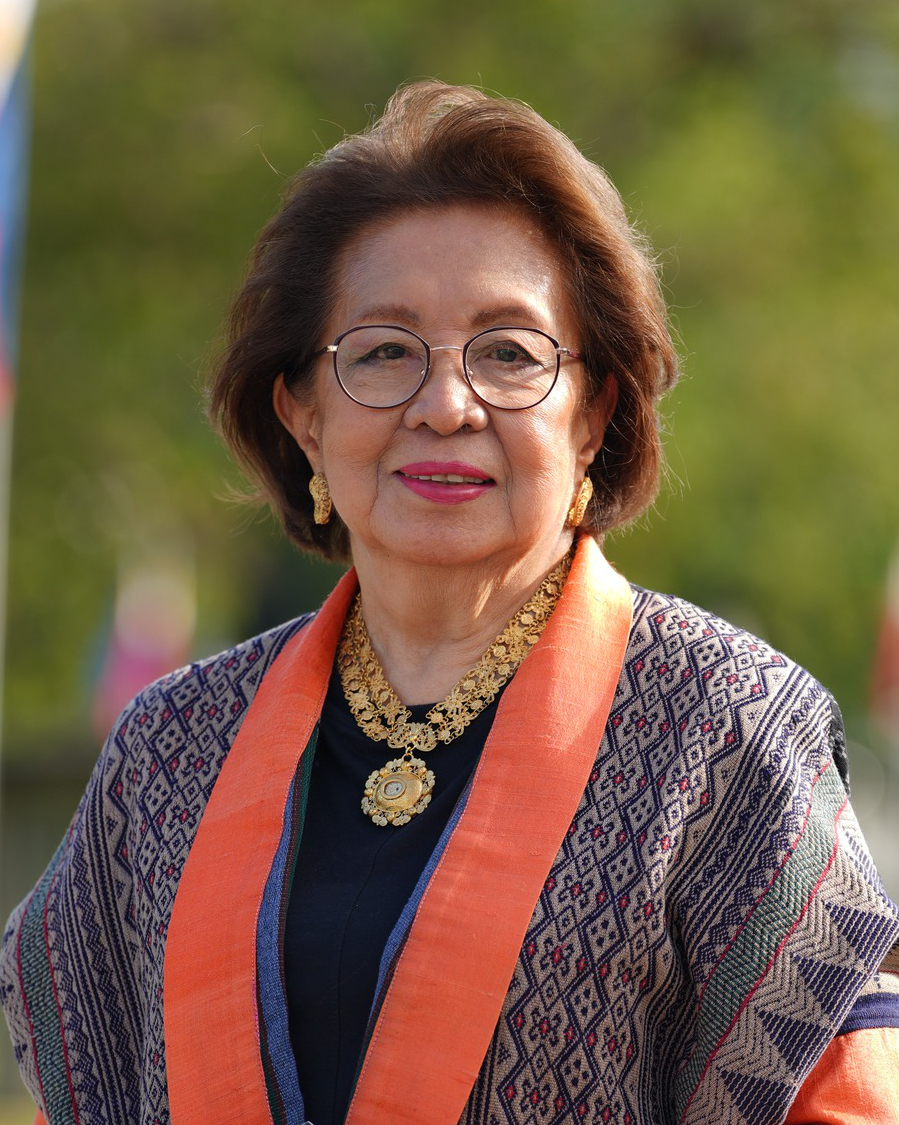
- Carpio-Morales in 2026

5th Ombudsman of the Philippines
- In office July 26, 2011 – July 26, 2018
- President: Benigno Aquino III; Rodrigo Duterte
- Preceded by: Merceditas Gutierrez
- Succeeded by: Samuel Martires

151st Associate Justice of the Supreme Court of the Philippines
- In office August 26, 2002 – June 19, 2011
- Appointed by: Gloria Macapagal Arroyo
- Preceded by: Jose Melo
- Succeeded by: Estela Perlas-Bernabe

Personal details
- Born: Conchita Claudio Carpio; June 19, 1941 (age 85) Paoay, Ilocos Norte, Commonwealth of the Philippines
- Spouse: Eugenio Tariga Morales Jr.
- Relations: Antonio Carpio (cousin); Mans Carpio (nephew)
- Children: Eugenio III; Umberto (died 2015)
- Education: University of the Philippines Diliman (BA, LLB)

Conchita Carpio Morales (Tagalog pronunciation: [konˈtʃɪta ˈkaɾpjo]; born Conchita Claudio Carpio; June 19, 1941) is a Filipino lawyer and jurist who served at the ombudsman of the Philippines serving from 2011 to 2018. Prior to this, she was an associate justice of the Supreme Court of the Philippines from 2002 to 2011. Across her career, she secured appointments from five Philippine presidents: Ferdinand Marcos, Corazon Aquino, Fidel Ramos, Gloria Macapagal Arroyo, and Benigno Aquino III.

Beginning her career in private practice, Carpio-Morales later joined the Department of Justice and served as a judge in lower courts. Appointed to the Supreme Court in 2002, she became known for her independent stances, notably as the sole dissenter in the 2010 case that allowed outgoing President Gloria Macapagal Arroyo to appoint the next chief justice during an election period. In a break from tradition, incoming President Benigno Aquino III chose Carpio-Morales to administer his oath of office in 2010, making her the first female magistrate to swear in a Philippine president.

As ombudsman, Carpio-Morales oversaw the indictment and dismissal of numerous high-ranking government officials, including senators and former presidents, particularly during the Priority Development Assistance Fund scam. Her aggressive anti-corruption campaign earned her the Ramon Magsaysay Award in 2016.

Following her retirement, she remained active in public affairs. In 2019, she filed a crimes against humanity communication against Chinese President Xi Jinping regarding activities in the South China Sea, and later served as co-convener of the political coalition 1Sambayan ahead of the 2022 elections.

== Early life and education ==
Conchita "Chit" Claudio Carpio was born on June 19, 1941, in Paoay, Ilocos Norte, to Lucas Dumlao Carpio Sr., a Justice of the Peace (now equivalent to a trial court judge), and Maria Claudio Carpio. Her father was a member of the Iglesia Filipina Independiente, while her mother was Catholic. She was baptized as a Catholic.

When she was younger, she played marbles, climbed the Paoay Tower, and memorized Shakespeare's passages on the urging of her father. She said that she wanted to be a princess and perform in front of people, especially during fiestas. She also had dreams of being an opera singer. She says she did not consciously plan to be a lawyer, but grew up surrounded by law books and the Official Gazette. According to her, "Perhaps subconsciously, I found the law profession exciting."

She attended Paoay Elementary School and spent her high school years at the Paoay North Institute. She achieved the honour as elementary and high school valedictorian. She was the only one among her six siblings who did not study in a Catholic school.

Active in extra-curricular activities, the young Chit played volleyball, the piano, and even did ballroom dancing by the time she reached college.

She then earned her Bachelor of Arts degree in Economics at the University of the Philippines (UP), Diliman, in 1964. In 1968, she earned a Bachelor of Laws from the University of the Philippines College of Law in Diliman. She passed the bar in 1969.

== Early career ==
=== Private practice ===
Her first job was with the private law firm Atienza, Tabora & Del Rosario Law Offices, where she held the post of Assistant Attorney. She counts Atty. Arturo B. Atienza, her boss at the time, as one of her role models.

=== Department of Justice ===
Carpio-Morales joined the Department of Justice (DOJ) in 1971 as Special Assistant to then Justice Secretary Vicente Abad Santos, her former law professor and long-time Dean of the UP College of Law. At the time, she reviewed resolutions of state prosecutors in criminal complaints that were ultimately for the Secretary.

According to her, her experience at the DOJ taught her “to marshal facts correctly. The most difficult part of deciding the case is marshaling the facts. The moment that you can marshal them, in the best way you can, then it’s just a matter of applying the law, right or wrong.”

Carpio-Morales mentioned that it was hard for her to find role models among women lawyers, because there was so few of them. However, she found her role models at the DOJ, whom she described as "...women of integrity, of competence, of uncrackable reputation.” These included Lorna Lombos dela Fuente, then Assistant Chief of the Legal Division of the Department, who became a Court of Appeals Justice, and Assistant Chief State Counsel Minerva Gonzaga Reyes, who become a Supreme Court Justice.

She worked at the DOJ for almost 12 years.

=== Lower courts ===
In 1983, former President Ferdinand Marcos appointed Carpio-Morales as a Regional Trial Court (RTC) judge in Pili, Camarines Sur. President Corazon Aquino, Marcos' successor, then appointed Carpio-Morales as a Pasay RTC judge in 1986.

In 1994, then President Fidel V. Ramos appointed her to the Court of Appeals, where she eventually headed the 7th Division as Associate Justice.

== Supreme Court ==
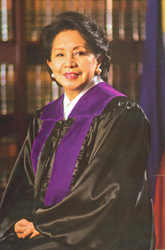
Portrait as a Supreme Court associate justice

In 2002, upon the unanimous endorsement of the members of the Judicial and Bar Council, Carpio-Morales was appointed to the Supreme Court (SC) as Supreme Court Associate Justice by then-President Gloria Macapagal Arroyo.

She was only the tenth woman to be appointed to the Supreme Court.

In De Castro v Judicial and Bar Council (2010), the question of whether or not then-President Arroyo was allowed to appoint the next Chief Justice of the Supreme Court was brought to the fore, given that then-outgoing Supreme Court Chief Justice Reynato Puno was retiring within the period that the 1987 Philippine Constitution prohibited the President from making appointments to executive positions. Three of the Supreme Court justices recused themselves from the case, two said that case was premature, and seven voted to allow the President to choose the next Chief Justice. Carpio-Morales was the sole dissenter. Supreme Court Associate Justice Renato Corona was then selected by President Arroyo to succeed Chief Justice Puno.

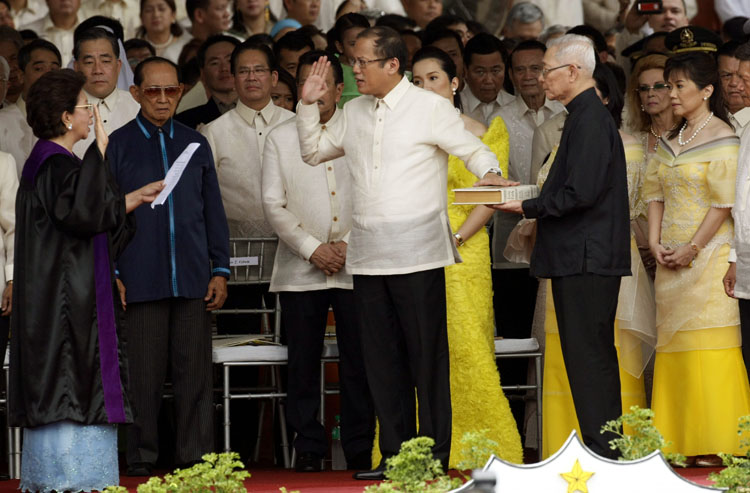
Morales administering the oath of office to Benigno Aquino III

After being elected as the 15th President of the Philippines to replace Arroyo, Benigno Aquino III requested that Carpio-Morales administer his oath-taking. Traditionally, it is the Supreme Court's Chief Justice who administers the oath of office to the incoming President and Vice President. However, then-President-elect Aquino refused to have Chief Justice Renato Corona swear him into office due to Aquino's opposition to the midnight appointment. Carpio-Morales was Aquino's choice to swear him in. Carpio-Morales officially accepted the request, and administered the oath-taking of President Benigno Aquino III and Vice President Jejomar Binay on June 30, 2010, at the Quirino Grandstand in Rizal Park, Manila.

Carpio-Morales is the first woman justice to administer the oath of office to an incoming President of the Philippines.

=== Notable Cases/Opinions ===
- John Hay Peoples Alternative Coalition v. Lim (2003) — on authority of the President to grant tax exemptions without congressional authorization
- Francisco v. House of Representatives (2003) — on the impeachment resolution against Chief Justice Hilario Davide, Jr.
- La Bugal- B’Laan Tribal Association, Inc. v. Ramos I (2004) and II (2004) - Dissenting — on the constitutionality of the Mining Act of 1995 (Dissent joined by J. Ynares-Santiago)
- Tecson v. COMELEC (2004) - Dissenting — on the nationality of presidential candidate Fernando Poe, Jr. (joined by J. Quisumbing and Corona)
- Central Bank Employees v. BSP (2004) - Dissenting — on claims for wage increases of government employees in accordance with equal protection clause even absent enabling legislation
- CSC v. DBM (2005) — on fiscal autonomy of Civil Service Commission
- Yuchengco v. Sandiganbayan (2006) — on the recovery of shares of stock in PLDT as part of the ill-gotten wealth of Ferdinand Marcos
- Senate v. Ermita (2006) — on validity of presidential ban prohibiting executive officials testifying before legislative inquiries without presidential consent
- Santos-Concio v. Department of Justice (2008) — on the DOJ's conduct of preliminary investigation of the Wowoweee stampede incident
- Trillanes IV v. Pimentel, Sr. (2008) — on the general and blanket request of Senator Antonio Trillanes IV, who is detained for rebellion charges, to attend Senate Sessions
- The Province of North Cotabato v. Republic (2008) - on the unconstitutionality of the Memorandum of Agreement on the Ancestral Domain (MOA-AD) aspect of the Tripoli Agreement on Peace of 2001 between the Moro Islamic Liberation Front and the government of the Republic of the Philippines
- Topacio v. Ong (2008) - "on the qualification status of Justice Gregory Ong as Associate Justice of the Sandiganbayan
- Strategic Alliance Development Corporation v. Radstock Securities Ltd. (2009) - Concurring — On the multi-billion peso compromise agreement between Radstock Securities Limited and Philippine National Construction Corporation
- De Castro v. Judicial and Bar Council (March 2010) - Dissenting and - Dissenting(April 2010) — On the President's power to appoint the Chief Justice vis-a-vis the Constitutional prohibition against appointments during the presidential election period.
- Biraogo vs. Philippine Truth Commission (December 2010) - Dissenting - On the validity and constitutionality of the establishment of the Philippine Truth Commission (PTC)
- Republic of the Philippines vs. Sandiganbayan, Eduardo Cojuangco, Jr, et al (April 2011) - Dissenting - On the disputed San Miguel Corporation shares of Eduardo "Danding" Cojuangco which were allegedly purchased using coconut levy funds.

== Office of the Ombudsman ==
On July 25, 2011, during his State of the Nation Address, President Benigno Aquino III announced the appointment of Carpio-Morales as Ombudsman of the Philippines under the Office of the Ombudsman (OMB). The Ombudsman is tasked to act on complaints against the officers or employees of the government, giving priority to complaints against high-ranking officials, covering grave offenses, and involving large sums of money or property.

When Carpio-Morales assumed office in 2011, she inherited a caseload of 11,000 pending criminal and administrative cases.

Under the leadership of Carpio-Morales, she professionalized and upgraded OMB's capabilities; revolutionized its anti-corruption program to include the designation of deputy ombudsmen for environmental concerns and for investment-related problems; and improved its responsiveness to calls for public assistance. She has also set a target of zero backlog in the investigation or adjudication of cases and disposition of all requests for assistance, and she expects to hit the target by 2018. The independence and quality of OMB's fact-finding investigations, evidence build-up, prosecution strategies and case management have also been improved. As a result, the conviction rate of cases handled by OMB before the Sandiganbayan from 2011 to 2015 rose from 33.3 percent to 74.5 percent.

She has prioritized the filing of cases against high-ranking officials, and has imposed strict administrative sanctions on high officials, including filing cases against a former president; a former vice-president; incumbent senators, congressmen, and governors. She is the first Ombudsman to use the waiver in the Statement of Assets, Liabilities and Net Worth (required of government officials and employees) as a basis to secure bank records in impeaching one of the country's highest officials.

Recognizing that corruption is not just a matter of persons but systems, Carpio-Morales took the initiative in creating an integrity management-based program that mobilizes government agencies and the public and addresses the lack of strategy and direction in the overall anti-corruption campaign. She also advocated the passage of legislation to strengthen the OMB's investigative, disciplinary, asset recovery, and preventive powers.

When asked last September 2016 about her greatest accomplishment as an Ombudsman on Solita "Winnie" Monsod's TV show Bawal ang Pasaway, she said that it was her having "put order in the office, because it was in a state of disorder" when she came in, as well as her implementing some reforms that she wants to institutionalize before she vacates her position. Among these reforms include the system of evaluation of cases, which was partly addressed by the increase in the number of divisions and justices in the Sandiganbayan, and the Integrity Caravan.

During her Ombudsmanship, she commuted daily from her home in Muntinlupa to her office at the Office of the Ombudsman in Quezon City. She used to leave home at 5:40 a.m., and arrived at her office between 6:10 to 6:15 a.m. On a weekday, she tries to resolve between 30 and 35 cases a day before leaving for home before 5:00 p.m. She also went to her office every Saturday, when she is able to resolve around 50 cases.

The action papers submitted to Carpio-Morales were closely scrutinized. To her, it is not just a matter of deciding if the paper is "Approved" or "Disapproved", but is also about looking at the substance of the case. She also demanded that the action papers be understandable to laypersons.

Carpio-Morales considers her position as Ombudsman to be the most challenging job she has ever held. Compared with the Supreme Court, she found that there was the assurance of greater quality control because of the presence of the other justices, but as Ombudsman, she alone renders the decision. When making her decisions, she does not believe in compromising the fight against derelict officials. To quote, “But yung sabihin i-kompromise mo na lang ito kasi ganito ganoon, no way. No. Walang mawawala sa akin.” (Translation: To be told to just compromise because of this or that, no way. No. I will not lose anything.) With regard to her agency, Morales says, "We do not take orders from anyone. We are independent. Period."

Under the Duterte administration, Carpio-Morales decided to recuse herself from any investigation involving President Rodrigo Duterte and his family due to her conflict of interest as the aunt of Mans Carpio (Duterte's son-in-law); she instead authorized Melchor Arthur Carandang, the overall deputy ombudsman, to handle all cases involving the Duterte family.

Three months before stepping down, Carpio-Morales called on the people during a conference with the Integrated Bar of the Philippines (IBP) to "don't be silent amid abuse", referring to president Rodrigo Duterte's Philippine drug war, abuse reports due to martial rule in Mindanao, and other government crackdowns. In June, Morales said in an interview that "the lesson to learn is to never think that you are infallible", adding, amidst criticism from president Duterte, that "I don't quantify success. Success to me is the respect you elicit from people. If people like what you did, that to me is success." Morales stepped down as Ombudsman on July 26, 2018, after a completion of a seven-year term and was succeeded by Duterte-appointed Samuel Martires.

=== Notable decisions ===
- Dismissal and perpetual disqualification from government service of former Philippine National Police chief Alan Purisima for grave misconduct, serious dishonesty, and grave abuse of authority over the anomalous 2011 courier service contract with Werfast Documentary Agency. June 2015.
- Dismissal and perpetual disqualification from holding public office of Makati Mayor Jejomar Erwin "Junjun" Binay for grave misconduct and serious dishonesty over the overpricing of Makati City Hall Building II. October 2015.
- Dismissal and perpetual disqualification from holding public office of former Congressman (and current Senator) Joel Villanueva for grave misconduct, senior dishonesty, and conduct prejudicial to the interest of service over the misuse of his Priority Development Assistance Fund (PDAF) allocation during his tenure as Congressman. November 2016.
- Dismissal and perpetual disqualification from holding public office of Atty. Jessica Lucila "Gigi" Reyes, former Chief of Staff of former Senator Juan Ponce Enrile, for Grave Misconduct, Conduct Prejudicial to the Best Interest of the Service, and Dishonesty in relation to the Priority Assistance Development Fund (PDAF) pork barrel scam. February 2017
- Dismissal and perpetual disqualification from holding public office of former Cebu Governor (and current 3rd District Representative of Cebu) Gwendolyn Garcia for grave misconduct over the purchase of the Balili, Naga, Cebu property during her tenure as Cebu Governor. February 2018.

=== Notable indictments ===
- Former President (and current Pampanga Congresswoman) Gloria Macapagal Arroyo and her spouse, Jose Miguel Arroyo, charged with graft and corruption at the Sandiganbayan in connection with the (National Broadband Network - ZTE Corp. (NBN - ZTE) deal. September 2011.
- Former Chief Justice Renato Corona, charged with ill-gotten wealth and falsification of public documents in connection with his Statement of Assets and Liabilities (SALN). January 2014.
- Senators Juan Ponce Enrile, Ramon "Bong" Revilla, Jr., "Jinggoy" Estrada, as well as Janet Lim-Napoles, charged with plunder at the Sandiganbayan in connection with alleged kickbacks from the Priority Development Assistance Fund (PDAF). April 2014.
- Former Muntinlupa Representative (and current Mayor) Rozzano Rufino "Ruffy" Biazon and Energy Regulatory Commission Chief Zenaida Ducut, charged with draft, malversation, and direct bribery charges in connection with the misallocation of their Priority Development Assistance Fund (PDAF). July 2015.
- Retired Army General Jovito Palparan, charged with the kidnapping and illegal detention of the brothers Reynaldo and Raymond Manalo. July 2015.
- Taguig Mayor Laarni "Lani" Cayetano, charged with violation of Article 143 of the Revised Penal Code, which penalizes persons who, by force or fraud, prevent or tend to prevent the meetings of local legislative bodies. August 2015.
- Dismissed Philippine National Police (PNP) chief Alan Purisima and former Special Action Force (SAF) commander Getulio Napeñas for graft and usurpation of powers in connection with the 2015 Mamasapano incident, which led to the deaths of 44 Special Action Force members, who were dubbed as the SAF 44. January 2017.
- Former Vice-President Jejomar Binay and dismissed Makati Mayor Jejomar Erwin "Junjun" Binay, charged with graft and corruption at the Sandiganbayan in connection with irregularities over the construction of the 1.3 billion peso Makati Science High School Building. August 2017.
- Former President Benigno "Noynoy" Aquino III, charged with graft and usurpation of authority in connection with the 2015 Mamasapano anti-terror raid. Earlier related charges have been filed against dismissed PNP Chief Alan Purisima and former SAF Commander Getulio Napeñas. November 2017.

== Retirement ==
After stepping down in July from her Ombudsmanship, Carpio-Morales urged her successor to 'stand versus corruption'. On November 24, 2018, Morales released a statement after four months since her retirement, stating, "A nation can survive its fools, and even the ambitious. But it cannot survive treason from within." The statement came in after president Rodrigo Duterte signed multiple partially undisclosed deals with Chinese Communist Party general secretary Xi Jinping, including an oil exploration deal which violates the Constitution and gives leeway to China's claims in the South China Sea.

She, along with former Philippine foreign affairs secretary Albert del Rosario, filed a communication in the International Criminal Court for crimes against humanity against Chinese Communist Party leader Xi Jinping due to China's environmentally destructive activities in the South China Sea, particularly its building of artificial islands. The communication was verified and has since been analyzed by the ICC last May 2019.

== Personal life ==
Carpio-Morales comes from a family of lawyers, which include her father, three of his brothers, and her cousin, former Supreme Court Associate Justice Antonio Carpio.

Baptized as a Catholic, she remains Catholic, although she says that "...I'm not religious. I've always been very vocal about it...I don't think my Catholic upbringing had any impact on my work."

She is married to Eugenio T. Morales, Jr., a retired director of the Land Transportation Franchising and Regulatory Board. They have two sons, Eugenio Morales III and Umberto "Bert" Morales.

Bert, an athlete who was a non-smoker, was unexpectedly diagnosed in June 2015 with Stage 4 lung cancer, which had already metastasized. During this time, although people at the Office of the Ombudsman were aware that Bert was sick, they did not know how serious his health situation was. In fact, all throughout this period, many notable decisions and indictments happened at Carpio-Morales' office (see Notable Decisions and Notable Indictments) After five months of battling cancer, Bert died in October 2015. He was 41 years old.

Two days after Bert's death, Carpio-Morales announced the indictment on criminal charges of then-Vice President Binay and his son, then-Makati Mayor Jejomar Binay Jr.. The Ombudsman's dismissals, suspensions, and other work-related activities continued afterwards, as Carpio Morales continued on with her duties. As she described this time, “Work would take me away from the feeling of sadness. I had to occupy myself, for if not…”.

She has two grandchildren from Bert whom she dotes on. As she describes it, "They break the stress attendant to my work." Upon winning the Ramon Magsaysay Award in 2016, Carpio Morales read a letter to her grandchildren Ennio and Cece, where she said that "I draw inspiration and energy from you. I continue working because I want to secure a just and honest society for you and for every Filipino child," ending it with "...as you go to bed tonight, know that your grandmother is optimistic that your tomorrow will be a better day."

Carpio-Morales has no personal social media accounts, but her staff lets her know when she goes viral. She says that she appreciates reading positive comments from netizens on social media, and is happy whenever the Supreme Court and the appellate courts concur with her actions as Ombudsman, as these stand as a testament to her hard work.

In the course of her career, she has received several death threats, which included threatening phone calls and the discovery of a grenade near the gate of her house in Muntinlupa.

Carpio-Morales is an antique lover who started collecting antiques in 1971 while working for the Department of Justice. One of her prized possessions is an antique chest she inherited from her mother. She paints and plays the piano in her free time. Her favorite composer is Franz Liszt. She has also said that her favorite foreign destination is Prague, and that she enjoys going to museums when she travels.

She is related through marriage to former Philippine President Rodrigo Duterte. Her brother, Lucas Carpio, Jr., is the father of Manases Carpio, who is married to Sara Duterte, incumbent Vice President of the Philippines and daughter of ex-President Duterte.

In January, 2016, Ombudsman Morales, with Leticia Evangelista Palomar, Merilu Carpio-Caludio, Bobby Carpio and Maretta Carpio led the launching of 216-page coffee table book “The Carpios of Paoay” at the Manila Hotel. It was conceptualized by Antonio Carpio, Palomar, Claudio and Baccay.

== Recognition, awards and achievements ==
Carpio-Morales was the recipient of the University of the Philippines Alumni Association (UPAA) Distinguished Alumni Award in Justice/Judiciary during the University of the Philippines' centenary in 2008. She was given the award “for delivering justice with courage and untrammelled integrity—a shining paragon to all magistrates, worthy of emulation and respect.”

In 2011, Carpio-Morales was honored as one of the Ten Outstanding Manilans, an award given to persons who have immensely contributed to the benefit and development of Manila and its residents, and whose achievements in their respective fields have given prestige to the country's capital. She was recognized for her performance in the field of law and jurisprudence for her "unquestionable integrity, impartial and fearless dispensation of justice, and her untarnished and dedicated 40-year government public service record."

She was then chosen by the Philippine Daily Inquirer as 2014's Filipino of the Year, together with then-Justice Secretary Leila De Lima and then-Commission on Audit Chair Grace Pulido-Tan, was chosen. These three ladies were given the moniker "Three Furies" and "Tres Marias."

Carpio-Morales received an honorary doctor of laws degree from the University of the Philippines on June 27, 2016. As stated by then UP President Alfredo Pascual, UP's Board of Regents conferred to her this honoris causa as "She has herself become the measure of integrity in the government service, the face of courage and daring determination, of competence and independence, and of one resolutely intolerant of corruption."

In the same year, Carpio-Morales was given the Ramon Magsaysay Award, regarded as Asia's Nobel Prize. As mentioned by the Ramon Magsaysay Board of Trustees board in the citation, she was elected to receive the award in recognition of “her moral courage and commitment to justice in taking head-on one of the most intractable problems in the Philippines; promoting by her example of incorruptibility, diligence, vision and leadership, the highest ethical standards in public service.”

In 2017, Carpio-Morales received Quezon City's Tandang Sora Award, in recognition of exhibiting the same values as Philippine heroine Melchora Aquino, who was known by the monicker Tandang Sora. These values are honesty, industry, service, word of honor, caring, and protectiveness. Carpio Morales' dedication and untarnished reputation as a public servant was also recognized through this award.

Political offices
Preceded by Orlando C. Casimiro; Acting	Ombudsman of the Philippines; 2011–2018	Succeeded by Samuel Martires
Legal offices
Preceded by Jose Melo	Associate Justice of the Supreme Court; 2002–2011	Succeeded by Estela Perlas-Bernabe
