= Shootout =

Combat of groups using firearms

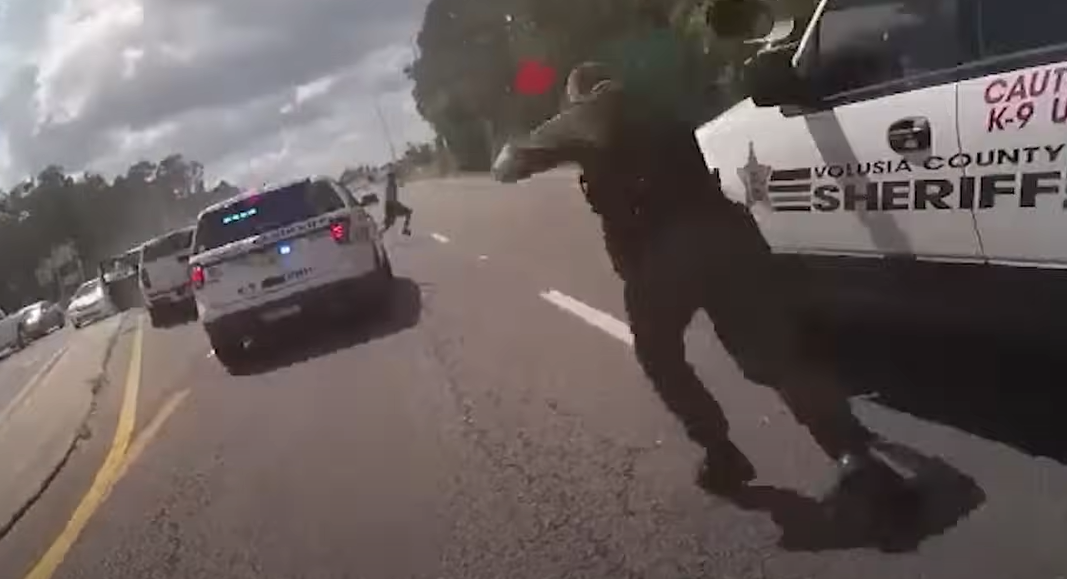
A still from police body camera footage of a shootout between a suspect and Volusia County, Florida sheriff's deputies in 2019

A shootout, also called a firefight, gunfight, or gun battle, is a confrontation in which parties armed with firearms exchange gunfire. The term can be used to describe any such fight, though it is typically used in a non-military context or to describe combat situations primarily using firearms (generally excluding crew-served weapons, combat vehicles, armed aircraft, or explosives).

Shootouts often pit law enforcement against criminals, though they can also involve parties outside of law enforcement, such as rival gangs, militias, or individuals. Military combat situations are rarely titled "shootouts", and are almost always considered battles, engagements, skirmishes, exchanges, or firefights.

Shootouts are often depicted in action films, Westerns, and video games.

== List of notable shootouts ==
Incident	Location	Date	Involved parties	Duration of shootout	Casualties (total)	Result
Gunfight at the O.K. Corral	Tombstone, Arizona Territory, United States	26 October 1881	United States Marshals Service and town marshal	<1 minute	3 killed 3 injured	Surviving Cowboys later conduct revenge attacks, leading to the Earp Vendetta Ride
Gunfight at the O.K. Corral	Tombstone, Arizona Territory, United States	26 October 1881	Cochise County Cowboys	<1 minute	3 killed 3 injured	Surviving Cowboys later conduct revenge attacks, leading to the Earp Vendetta Ride
Frisco shootout	Frisco, New Mexico Territory, United States	1–2 December 1884	Associates of a detained cowboy	36 hours	4 killed 8 injured	Cowboys fail to injure or kill Baca and retreat after depleting ammunition
Frisco shootout	Frisco, New Mexico Territory, United States	1–2 December 1884	Elfego Baca	36 hours	4 killed 8 injured	Cowboys fail to injure or kill Baca and retreat after depleting ammunition
1907 Tiflis bank robbery	Tiflis, Tiflis Governorate, Caucasus Viceroyalty, Russian Empire	26 June 1907	Bolsheviks	Unrecorded	40 killed 50 injured	Bolsheviks escape with 241,000 rubles
1907 Tiflis bank robbery	Tiflis, Tiflis Governorate, Caucasus Viceroyalty, Russian Empire	26 June 1907	State Bank of the Russian Empire guards and Imperial Russian Army	Unrecorded	40 killed 50 injured	Bolsheviks escape with 241,000 rubles
Tottenham Outrage	Tottenham, London, United Kingdom	23 January 1909	Metropolitan Police	2 hours	4 killed 21 injured	Helfeld and Lepidus commit suicide during and after incident
Tottenham Outrage	Tottenham, London, United Kingdom	23 January 1909	Paul Helfeld and Jacob Lepidus	2 hours	4 killed 21 injured	Helfeld and Lepidus commit suicide during and after incident
Siege of Sidney Street	Stepney, London, United Kingdom	3 January 1911	City of London Police, Metropolitan Police and the British Army	7 hours	2 killed 5 injured	Both gunmen killed; one by soldiers and one by smoke inhalation
Siege of Sidney Street	Stepney, London, United Kingdom	3 January 1911	Fritz Svaars and Josef Sokoloff	7 hours	2 killed 5 injured	Both gunmen killed; one by soldiers and one by smoke inhalation
Everett massacre	Everett, Washington, United States	5 November 1916	Snohomish County Sheriff's Office and vigilante posse	10 minutes	7 killed 47 injured 75 arrested	Engaged vessels break contact; surviving involved Wobblies arrested but later released
Everett massacre	Everett, Washington, United States	5 November 1916	Industrial Workers of the World	10 minutes	7 killed 47 injured 75 arrested	Engaged vessels break contact; surviving involved Wobblies arrested but later released
Battle of Matewan	Matewan, West Virginia, United States	19 May 1920	Baldwin–Felts Detective Agency	Unrecorded	10 killed 5 injured	Miners involved in shootout tried and acquitted; labor tensions in the region eventually lead to Battle of Blair Mountain
Battle of Matewan	Matewan, West Virginia, United States	19 May 1920	United Mine Workers of America	Unrecorded	10 killed 5 injured	Miners involved in shootout tried and acquitted; labor tensions in the region eventually lead to Battle of Blair Mountain
Beer Hall Putsch	Munich, Bavaria, Weimar Republic	8–9 November 1923	Kampfbund	<2 days	20 killed >12 injured Unknown number arrested	Adolf Hitler and other Nazi Party leaders arrested
Beer Hall Putsch	Munich, Bavaria, Weimar Republic	8–9 November 1923	Bavarian State Police and Reichswehr	<2 days	20 killed >12 injured Unknown number arrested	Adolf Hitler and other Nazi Party leaders arrested
Young Brothers massacre	Brookline, Missouri, United States	2 January 1932	Greene County Sheriff's Office and Springfield Police Department	Unrecorded	6 killed	Young brothers escape and are later killed in a standoff with the Houston Police Department on 5 January
Young Brothers massacre	Brookline, Missouri, United States	2 January 1932	Harry and Jennings Young	Unrecorded	6 killed	Young brothers escape and are later killed in a standoff with the Houston Police Department on 5 January
Kansas City massacre	Kansas City, Missouri, United States	17 June 1933	Gang led by Vernon C. Miller	~30 seconds	5 killed	Nash killed in ambush; Miller murdered, Adam Richetti arrested, and Pretty Boy Floyd killed after FBI-led manhunt
Kansas City massacre	Kansas City, Missouri, United States	17 June 1933	Federal Bureau of Investigation and McAlester Police Department chief escorting Frank Nash	~30 seconds	5 killed	Nash killed in ambush; Miller murdered, Adam Richetti arrested, and Pretty Boy Floyd killed after FBI-led manhunt
The Battle of Barrington	Barrington, Illinois, United States	27 November 1934	Federal Bureau of Investigation	<5 hours	3 killed	Outlaws flee; Nelson succumbs to a fatal abdomen wound; Helen and Chase later arrested
The Battle of Barrington	Barrington, Illinois, United States	27 November 1934	Baby Face Nelson, Helen Gillis, and John Paul Chase	<5 hours	3 killed	Outlaws flee; Nelson succumbs to a fatal abdomen wound; Helen and Chase later arrested
Battle of Bamber Bridge	Bamber Bridge, Lancashire, United Kingdom	24–25 June 1943	34th Military Police Company, Minnesota National Guard	<1 day (ended by 4:00 am)	1 dead 7 injured 32 arrested	32 African American 1511th soldiers court martialed; Eighth Air Force command and military police reorganized to prevent further racial violence
Battle of Bamber Bridge	Bamber Bridge, Lancashire, United Kingdom	24–25 June 1943	1511th Quartermaster Truck Regiment, Eighth Air Force	<1 day (ended by 4:00 am)	1 dead 7 injured 32 arrested	32 African American 1511th soldiers court martialed; Eighth Air Force command and military police reorganized to prevent further racial violence
University of Texas tower shooting	Austin, Texas, United States	1 August 1966	Charles Whitman	2 hours	18 killed 31 injured	Whitman killed by police
University of Texas tower shooting	Austin, Texas, United States	1 August 1966	Austin Police Department and local residents	2 hours	18 killed 31 injured	Whitman killed by police
Newhall incident	Santa Clarita, California, United States	5–6 April 1970	Jack Wright Twinning and Bobby Augusta Davis	~9 hours	5 killed 1 injured	Davis arrested; Twinning commits suicide after standoff
Newhall incident	Santa Clarita, California, United States	5–6 April 1970	California Highway Patrol, Los Angeles County Sheriff's Department, and two civilians	~9 hours	5 killed 1 injured	Davis arrested; Twinning commits suicide after standoff
Asama-Sansō incident	Karuizawa, Nagano Prefecture, Japan	19–28 February 1972	United Red Army	9 days	3 killed 28 wounded 5 arrested	URA militants arrested after standoff
Asama-Sansō incident	Karuizawa, Nagano Prefecture, Japan	19–28 February 1972	Nagano Prefectural Police	9 days	3 killed 28 wounded 5 arrested	URA militants arrested after standoff
New Orleans sniper attacks	New Orleans, Louisiana, United States	31 December 1972 – 7 January 1973	Mark Essex	29 hours (including ~1-hour shootout on 31 December)	9 killed 12 injured	Essex killed by police
New Orleans sniper attacks	New Orleans, Louisiana, United States	31 December 1972 – 7 January 1973	New Orleans Police Department	29 hours (including ~1-hour shootout on 31 December)	9 killed 12 injured	Essex killed by police
1974 Symbionese Liberation Army shootout	Los Angeles, California, United States	17 May 1974	Los Angeles Police Department	Unrecorded	6 killed	SLA militants killed in unintentional fire set by tear gas canisters
1974 Symbionese Liberation Army shootout	Los Angeles, California, United States	17 May 1974	Symbionese Liberation Army	Unrecorded	6 killed	SLA militants killed in unintentional fire set by tear gas canisters
Iranian Embassy siege	South Kensington, London, United Kingdom	30 April – 5 May 1980	Special Air Service	17 minutes	6 killed 3 wounded 1 arrested	SAS assault kills 5 of 6 hostage-takers
Iranian Embassy siege	South Kensington, London, United Kingdom	30 April – 5 May 1980	Democratic Revolutionary Front for the Liberation of Arabistan	17 minutes	6 killed 3 wounded 1 arrested	SAS assault kills 5 of 6 hostage-takers
Norco shootout	Norco, California, United States	9 May 1980	Five bank robbers	Unrecorded	3 killed 11 injured	Three surviving gunmen arrested, one commits suicide
Norco shootout	Norco, California, United States	9 May 1980	Riverside County Sheriff's Department, San Bernardino County Sheriff's Department, and California Highway Patrol	Unrecorded	3 killed 11 injured	Three surviving gunmen arrested, one commits suicide
1981 Brink's robbery	Nanuet, New York, United States	20 October 1981	Black Liberation Army and May 19th Communist Organization	Unrecorded	3 killed 3 injured	All surviving robbers and associates apprehended by 1986
1981 Brink's robbery	Nanuet, New York, United States	20 October 1981	Brink's and Nanuet Police Department	Unrecorded	3 killed 3 injured	All surviving robbers and associates apprehended by 1986
Shannon Street massacre	Memphis, Tennessee, United States	11–13 January 1983	Memphis Police Department	30 hours (raid lasted 20 minutes)	8 killed 2 injured	All cultists killed, captured police officer found dead
Shannon Street massacre	Memphis, Tennessee, United States	11–13 January 1983	Seven "Black Jesus" cult members	30 hours (raid lasted 20 minutes)	8 killed 2 injured	All cultists killed, captured police officer found dead
Milperra massacre	Milperra, Sydney, New South Wales, Australia	2 September 1984	Comanchero Motorcycle Club	>15 minutes	7 killed 28 injured	Surviving combatants apprehended by police
Milperra massacre	Milperra, Sydney, New South Wales, Australia	2 September 1984	Bandidos Motorcycle Club	>15 minutes	7 killed 28 injured	Surviving combatants apprehended by police
1985 MOVE bombing	Philadelphia, Pennsylvania, United States	13 May 1985	Philadelphia Police Department	~18 hours	11 killed	Philadelphia Police sued for excessive force for bombing MOVE headquarters and neighboring properties
1985 MOVE bombing	Philadelphia, Pennsylvania, United States	13 May 1985	MOVE	~18 hours	11 killed	Philadelphia Police sued for excessive force for bombing MOVE headquarters and neighboring properties
1986 FBI Miami shootout	Miami, Florida, United States	11 April 1986	Federal Bureau of Investigation	5 minutes	4 killed 5 injured	Platt and Matix killed in shootout
1986 FBI Miami shootout	Miami, Florida, United States	11 April 1986	Michael Lee Platt and William Russell Matix	5 minutes	4 killed 5 injured	Platt and Matix killed in shootout
Ash Street shootout	Tacoma, Washington, United States	23 September 1989	12 off-duty United States Army Rangers	5–30 minutes	1 injured (alleged) 2 arrested	Alleged drug dealers flee; Rangers briefly detained by Tacoma Police Department and released
Ash Street shootout	Tacoma, Washington, United States	23 September 1989	15–20 alleged drug dealers	5–30 minutes	1 injured (alleged) 2 arrested	Alleged drug dealers flee; Rangers briefly detained by Tacoma Police Department and released
1991 Lokhandwala Complex shootout	Mumbai, Maharashtra, India	16 November 1991	Bombay Police Anti-Terrorism Squad	4 hours	7 killed 24 injured	All D-Company gangsters killed by police
1991 Lokhandwala Complex shootout	Mumbai, Maharashtra, India	16 November 1991	Seven D-Company gangsters	4 hours	7 killed 24 injured	All D-Company gangsters killed by police
Ruby Ridge standoff	Naples, Idaho, United States	21–31 August 1992	United States Marshals Service, Federal Bureau of Investigation, Bureau of Alcohol, Tobacco, Firearms and Explosives, and other federal and state law enforcement	10 days	3 killed 2 injured	Samuel and Vicki Weaver killed; remaining holdouts surrender following negotiations
Ruby Ridge standoff	Naples, Idaho, United States	21–31 August 1992	Randy Weaver, Weaver family, and Kevin Harris	10 days	3 killed 2 injured	Samuel and Vicki Weaver killed; remaining holdouts surrender following negotiations
Waco siege	Waco, Texas, United States	28 February – 19 April 1993	Bureau of Alcohol, Tobacco, Firearms and Explosives, Federal Bureau of Investigation, and other federal and state law enforcement	51 days	86 killed 27 injured	Branch Davidian compound destroyed in fatal fire
Waco siege	Waco, Texas, United States	28 February – 19 April 1993	Branch Davidians	51 days	86 killed 27 injured	Branch Davidian compound destroyed in fatal fire
Air France Flight 8969 raid	Marseille, Bouches-du-Rhône, France	26 December 1994	GIGN	20 minutes	7 killed (3 prior to raid) 15 injured	Hijackers killed; surviving passengers and crew rescued
Air France Flight 8969 raid	Marseille, Bouches-du-Rhône, France	26 December 1994	Armed Islamic Group of Algeria	20 minutes	7 killed (3 prior to raid) 15 injured	Hijackers killed; surviving passengers and crew rescued
Operation Chavín de Huántar	Lima, Lima province, Peru	22 April 1997	Chavín de Huántar Command	22 minutes	17 killed 8 injured	All hostage-takers killed; surviving hostages rescued
Operation Chavín de Huántar	Lima, Lima province, Peru	22 April 1997	Túpac Amaru Revolutionary Movement	22 minutes	17 killed 8 injured	All hostage-takers killed; surviving hostages rescued
North Hollywood shootout	Los Angeles, California, United States	28 February 1997	Los Angeles Police Department	44 minutes	2 killed 20 injured	Phillips and Mătăsăreanu killed in shootout
North Hollywood shootout	Los Angeles, California, United States	28 February 1997	Larry Phillips Jr. and Emil Mătăsăreanu	44 minutes	2 killed 20 injured	Phillips and Mătăsăreanu killed in shootout
2003 Ennis shooting	Ennis, Montana, United States	14 June 2003	George Harold Davis	Unrecorded	1 killed 10 injured	Davis arrested by police
2003 Ennis shooting	Ennis, Montana, United States	14 June 2003	Ravalli County Sheriff's Office and Montana Highway Patrol	Unrecorded	1 killed 10 injured	Davis arrested by police
Tyler courthouse shooting	Tyler, Texas, United States	24 February 2005	David Hernandez Arroyo Sr.	Unrecorded	3 killed 4 injured	Arroyo killed by police
Tyler courthouse shooting	Tyler, Texas, United States	24 February 2005	Tyler Police Department and Smith County Sheriff’s Office	Unrecorded	3 killed 4 injured	Arroyo killed by police
2008 Mumbai attacks	Mumbai, Maharashtra, India	26–29 November 2008	Lashkar-e-Taiba	4 days	175 killed >300 injured 1 arrested	All terrorists killed; Ajmal Kasab captured and executed; investigations allege links to Pakistan
2008 Mumbai attacks	Mumbai, Maharashtra, India	26–29 November 2008	Mumbai Police, National Security Guard, and Indian security forces	4 days	175 killed >300 injured 1 arrested	All terrorists killed; Ajmal Kasab captured and executed; investigations allege links to Pakistan
2008 Parañaque shootout	Parañaque, Metro Manila, Philippines	5 December 2008	Waray-Ozamis Gang	1 hour	17 killed	Several gangsters escape; PNP and SAF investigated for crossfire fatalities
2008 Parañaque shootout	Parañaque, Metro Manila, Philippines	5 December 2008	Philippine National Police and Special Action Force	1 hour	17 killed	Several gangsters escape; PNP and SAF investigated for crossfire fatalities
2009 shootings of Oakland police officers	Oakland, California, United States	21 March 2009	Lovelle Shawn Mixon	3 hours	5 killed 1 injured	Mixon killed by SWAT team
2009 shootings of Oakland police officers	Oakland, California, United States	21 March 2009	Oakland Police Department	3 hours	5 killed 1 injured	Mixon killed by SWAT team
2009 shooting of Pittsburgh police officers	Pittsburgh, Pennsylvania, United States	4 April 2009	Richard Poplawski	4 hours	3 killed 3 injured 1 arrested	Poplawski arrested and sentenced to death
2009 shooting of Pittsburgh police officers	Pittsburgh, Pennsylvania, United States	4 April 2009	Pittsburgh Police	4 hours	3 killed 3 injured 1 arrested	Poplawski arrested and sentenced to death
2010 Saric shootout	Sáric Municipality, Sonora, Mexico	1 July 2010	Beltrán-Leyva Organization	Unrecorded	21 killed 6 wounded 9 arrested	Assailants flee before police and military forces arrive
2010 Saric shootout	Sáric Municipality, Sonora, Mexico	1 July 2010	Sinaloa Cartel	Unrecorded	21 killed 6 wounded 9 arrested	Assailants flee before police and military forces arrive
Christopher Dorner shootings and manhunt	Los Angeles, California, United States	3–12 February 2013	Christopher Jordan Dorner	~10 days	5 killed 6 injured	Dorner killed in shootout with San Bernardino County Sheriff's Department
Christopher Dorner shootings and manhunt	Los Angeles, California, United States	3–12 February 2013	Los Angeles Police Department	~10 days	5 killed 6 injured	Dorner killed in shootout with San Bernardino County Sheriff's Department
Washington Navy Yard shooting	Washington, D.C., United States	16 September 2013	Aaron Alexis	1 hour	13 killed 8 injured	Alexis killed by police
Washington Navy Yard shooting	Washington, D.C., United States	16 September 2013	Metropolitan Police Department of the District of Columbia, Naval Criminal Investigative Service, and other law enforcement agencies	1 hour	13 killed 8 injured	Alexis killed by police
2014 China–Vietnam border shootout	Hải Hà district, Quảng Ninh province, Vietnam	18 April 2014	16 Uyghur illegal migrants	Unrecorded	7 killed 10 injured	Migrants killed by Vietnamese authorities or commit suicide; survivors surrender and are returned to China
2014 China–Vietnam border shootout	Hải Hà district, Quảng Ninh province, Vietnam	18 April 2014	Vietnam Border Guard	Unrecorded	7 killed 10 injured	Migrants killed by Vietnamese authorities or commit suicide; survivors surrender and are returned to China
2014 Stockton bank robbery	Stockton, California, United States	16 July 2014	Stockton Police Department and San Joaquin County Sheriff's Department	1 hour	3 killed 2 injured 1 arrested	Renteria, Martinez, and a hostage killed; Ramos arrested
2014 Stockton bank robbery	Stockton, California, United States	16 July 2014	Jaime Ramos, Gilbert Renteria, and Alex Martinez	1 hour	3 killed 2 injured 1 arrested	Renteria, Martinez, and a hostage killed; Ramos arrested
January 2015 Île-de-France attacks	Île-de-France, France	7–9 January 2015	Al-Qaeda in the Arabian Peninsula or the Islamic State (alleged)	~3 days	20 killed 22 injured	All three attackers killed by police
January 2015 Île-de-France attacks	Île-de-France, France	7–9 January 2015	National Police and National Gendarmerie	~3 days	20 killed 22 injured	All three attackers killed by police
2015 Waco shootout	Waco, Texas, United States	17 May 2015	Bandidos Motorcycle Club	Unrecorded	9 killed 18 injured 177 arrested	All charges ultimately dismissed
2015 Waco shootout	Waco, Texas, United States	17 May 2015	Cossacks Motorcycle Club	Unrecorded	9 killed 18 injured 177 arrested	All charges ultimately dismissed
2015 Waco shootout	Waco, Texas, United States	17 May 2015	Waco Police Department and Texas Highway Patrol	Unrecorded	9 killed 18 injured 177 arrested	All charges ultimately dismissed
2015 Saint-Denis raid	Saint-Denis, Seine-Saint-Denis, France	18 November 2015	Central Directorate of the Judicial Police and RAID	7 hours	3 killed 6 injured 5 arrested	Terrorist ring dismantled
2015 Saint-Denis raid	Saint-Denis, Seine-Saint-Denis, France	18 November 2015	Islamic State	7 hours	3 killed 6 injured 5 arrested	Terrorist ring dismantled
2016 shooting of Dallas police officers	Dallas, Texas, United States	7 July 2016	Micah Xavier Johnson	>5 hours	6 killed 11 injured	Johnson killed by police bomb
2016 shooting of Dallas police officers	Dallas, Texas, United States	7 July 2016	Dallas Police Department	>5 hours	6 killed 11 injured	Johnson killed by police bomb
2019 Miramar shootout	Miramar, Florida, United States	5 December 2019	Miami-Dade Police Department and Miramar Police Department	Unrecorded	4 killed 1 injured	Alexander, Hill, a hostage, and a bystander killed by police
2019 Miramar shootout	Miramar, Florida, United States	5 December 2019	Lamar Alexander and Ronnie Jerome Hill	Unrecorded	4 killed 1 injured	Alexander, Hill, a hostage, and a bystander killed by police
2019 Jersey City shooting	Jersey City, New Jersey, United States	10 December 2019	New Jersey law enforcement and New York City Police Department	3 hours	7 killed 3 injured	Anderson and Graham killed by police after shootout
2019 Jersey City shooting	Jersey City, New Jersey, United States	10 December 2019	David Anderson and Francine Graham	3 hours	7 killed 3 injured	Anderson and Graham killed by police after shootout
2021 Sunrise, Florida shootout	Sunrise, Florida, United States	2 February 2021	Federal Bureau of Investigation and Broward County Sheriff's Office	Unrecorded	3 killed 3 injured	Huber commits suicide
2021 Sunrise, Florida shootout	Sunrise, Florida, United States	2 February 2021	David Lee Huber	Unrecorded	3 killed 3 injured	Huber commits suicide
2022 Saanich shootout	Saanich, British Columbia, Canada	28 June 2022	Saanich Police Department and Victoria Police Department	~26 seconds	2 killed 6 injured	Auchterlonie brothers killed by police
2022 Saanich shootout	Saanich, British Columbia, Canada	28 June 2022	Mathew and Isaac Auchterlonie	~26 seconds	2 killed 6 injured	Auchterlonie brothers killed by police
2023 Louisville bank shooting	Louisville, Kentucky, United States	10 April 2023	Louisville Metro Police Department	<10 minutes	6 killed 8 injured	Sturgeon killed by police
2023 Louisville bank shooting	Louisville, Kentucky, United States	10 April 2023	Connor James Sturgeon	<10 minutes	6 killed 8 injured	Sturgeon killed by police
2026 Teotihuacan shooting	Pyramid of the Moon, Teotihuacan, State of Mexico, Mexico	20 april 2026	Mexican security forces	Unknown	2 killed 13 injured	A confrontation between Mexican security forces and Julio César Jasso Ramírez resulted in his leg being injured. At 11:45 a.m., the perpetrator died by suicide at the scene.
2026 Teotihuacan shooting	Pyramid of the Moon, Teotihuacan, State of Mexico, Mexico	20 april 2026	Julio César Jasso Ramírez	Unknown	2 killed 13 injured	A confrontation between Mexican security forces and Julio César Jasso Ramírez resulted in his leg being injured. At 11:45 a.m., the perpetrator died by suicide at the scene.

== See also ==
- Cordon and search
- Encounter killing
- List of hostage crises
- Siege#Police sieges
- 1813 Jackson–Benton brawl
- Duel
