= Foulke =

Foulke or Foulk is a surname. Notable people with the surname include:

- Betty Foulk, American sailor
- Bill Foulk, US Army Ranger involved in the 1989 Ash Street shootout in Tacoma, Washington
- Edwin Foulke, American lawyer and government official
- George Clayton Foulk (1856–1893), American diplomat
- Keith Foulke (born 1972), American baseball player
- Robert Foulk (1908–1989), American actor
- William Foulke (disambiguation)

== See also ==
- Foulkes, another surname
