= William Foulkes =

William Foulkes may refer to:

- William Foulkes (priest) (died 1691), Welsh cleric
- Bill Foulkes (1932–2013), English footballer
- Billy Foulkes (1926–1979), Welsh footballer
- William Foulkes (footballer, born 1863), Wales international footballer of the 1880s

== See also ==
- William Foulke (disambiguation)
