= 2008 Parañaque shootout =

Shootout between Philippine police and gang

Parañaque shootout
- Date: December 5, 2008
- Location: Parañaque, Metro Manila
- Result: Inconclusive: Law enforcement neutralized many hostiles but others escaped.; Multiple civilian casualties on the part of the PNP.

Parties
Philippine National Police	Waray-Ozamiz Gang

Lead figures
PSUPT Eleuterio Gutierrez; PCINSP Lawrence Cajipe; PCINSP Joel Mendoza	Rolando "Kalag" Osorio

Casualties and losses
1 SAF member killed 1 security guard killed 1 barangay tanod killed	12 gangsters killed
- 4 civilians killed

The Parañaque shootout was a deadly confrontation between members of the Philippine National Police and the Special Action Force, against the Waray-Ozamiz Gang on December 5, 2008, in Parañaque, Metro Manila. The shootout became controversial due to the deaths of two civilians, including a 7-year-old girl. Director Leopoldo Bataoil, chief of the National Capital Region Police Office (NCRPO), described the event as the bloodiest firefight between lawmen and criminal elements in Metro Manila.

== Background ==
In the 2000s, many cities in Luzon were beset by crimes conducted by various robbery groups, many of whom were of Waray ethnicity. Poverty during President Gloria Macapagal Arroyo's administration caused many in faraway provinces to form or join a gang. Hold-ups were the primary activity, where they robbed cars and other vehicles in rural roads, as well as banks and stores in urban areas. At that time, they became notorious for their gunfights with law enforcement, with one gangster proclaiming how he hated the police during a robbery in Pampanga that left one policeman dead. One of these Waray gangs was allegedly under the leadership of infamous criminal Alvin Flores. Prior to the shootout, this specific gang made an alliance with an Ozamiz gang, made up of criminals from Ozamiz City, who were led and financed by a certain Inday Rocha.

== Shootout ==
In late 2008, the Philippine National Police (PNP) received intelligence that the "Waray-Ozamiz Gang" was in Parañaque City. The police reported that one of the gangsters, who was discontented with how the gang divided their loot, met with Superintendent Eleuterio Gutierrez, head of the HPG’s Task Force Limbas. The gangster tipped him that his group was planning to rob a car rental firm in the city, after receiving information that the aforementioned business had over P7 million in its premises. Chief Superintendent Perfecto Palad then coordinated with Metro Manila Police director Chief Leopoldo Bataoil, Special Action Force (SAF) director Chief Superintendent Leocadio Santiago, and Southern Police District (SPD) director Senior Superintendent Jaime Calungsud, to set up a plan in neutralizing the gang.

The PNP created a joint task force with members from the HPG and the SAF, and deployed over 11 police units at Sampaguita street in United Parañaque Subdivision, four hours before the gang's planned attack. Officials present in the operation included Superintendent Eleuterio Gutierrez, Chief Inspector Lawrence Cajipe and Chief Inspector Joel Mendoza. It was also alleged that a unit from the Armed Forces of the Philippines, specifically the Naval Intelligence and Security Force, was at the scene. In the evening, law enforcement personnel finally located the gangsters, who were driving SUVs and motorcycles, and began trailing them to a crowded subdivision in Sucat. Unfortunately, the gang spotted the officers and opened fire, prompting the task force to fire back. Both parties were well-armed, with the gang sporting M16s fitted with under-barrel grenade launchers. As the gangsters tried to escape, they began firing at a diesel tanker in the hopes of blowing it up and diverting the cops' attention.

During the shootout, the SAF officers managed to kill eight suspects inside the SUVs, while the HPG killed two more on a motorcycle. SAF member PO1 Nixon Visanoy was killed during the shootout, and Superintendent Gutierrez was wounded in the head. OFW seaman Jun De Vera and his daughter Lia, were caught in the crossfire and killed; as well as two civilian bystanders named Ronaldo Eusebio and Jessiery Basmayor. Two auxilliaries also died in the incident: security guard Arnel Malacawan who died on the spot, and barangay tanod Bernard Tuncab who died on the way to the hospital. By the end of the hour-long battle, seventeen people were killed including at least twelve criminals, but many had managed to escape.

== Aftermath ==
Many prominent members of the Waray-Ozamiz Gang, including Rolando Osorio (alias "Kalag" or "Rolando Malmis"), was captured days later after the gunfight. The police also offered a P1.3 million reward for information concerning the remaining gang members. Still, the PNP was criticized for their role in the deaths of the two De Veras after determining that the bullets that struck them came from their firearms. The head of the Internal Affairs Service of the PNP said, "We failed in our mission to protect the civilians. Because during the conduct of operation many civilian lives were lost." On July 29, 2009, it was reported that the Department of Justice (DOJ) had filed multiple murder charges against 29 policemen, including three generals, in connection with the shootout following the filing of a complaint-affidavit by Lilian de Vera, the wife of Jun De Vera.

On January 11, 2010, the Commission on Human Rights recommended the filing of criminal and administrative charges against 26 of the policemen. In March, two witnesses came forth stating De Vera and his daughter were not killed in the shootout, and that the policemen had already complete control of the area where the two were killed. The testimonies prompted the DOJ to file two counts of murder charges against 25 policemen. Eight policemen were eventually arrested for their role in the shootout: Chief Inspector Lawrence Cajipe, Chief Inspector Joel Mendoza, Inspector Gerardo Balacutan, Police Officers 3 Jolito Mamanao Jr. and Fernando Rey Gapuz, Police Officers 2 Eduardo Blanco and Edwin Santos, and PO1 Josil Rey Lucena. Seventeen SAF members were also arrested but exonerated in 2014.

== In popular culture ==
- The shootout was dramatized in an episode of Case Unclosed entitled "The December Shootout".
- The TV5 series Pulis Pulis aired an episode about the Paranaque shootout.
