= William Foulke =

William Foulke may refer to:

- William Dudley Foulke, American poet and reformer
- William Parker Foulke, American paleontologist
- William Foulke (footballer), known as William "Fatty" Foulke, English football (soccer) player

== Similar names ==
- William Foulkes (disambiguation)
- William "Bill" Foulk, participant in the Ash Street shootout
