= Hilltop, Tacoma, Washington =

Neighborhood in Tacoma, Washington, United States

Coordinates: 47°14′42″N 122°27′11″W

The Hilltop Neighborhood is a historically diverse neighborhood in the Tacoma, Washington Central District.

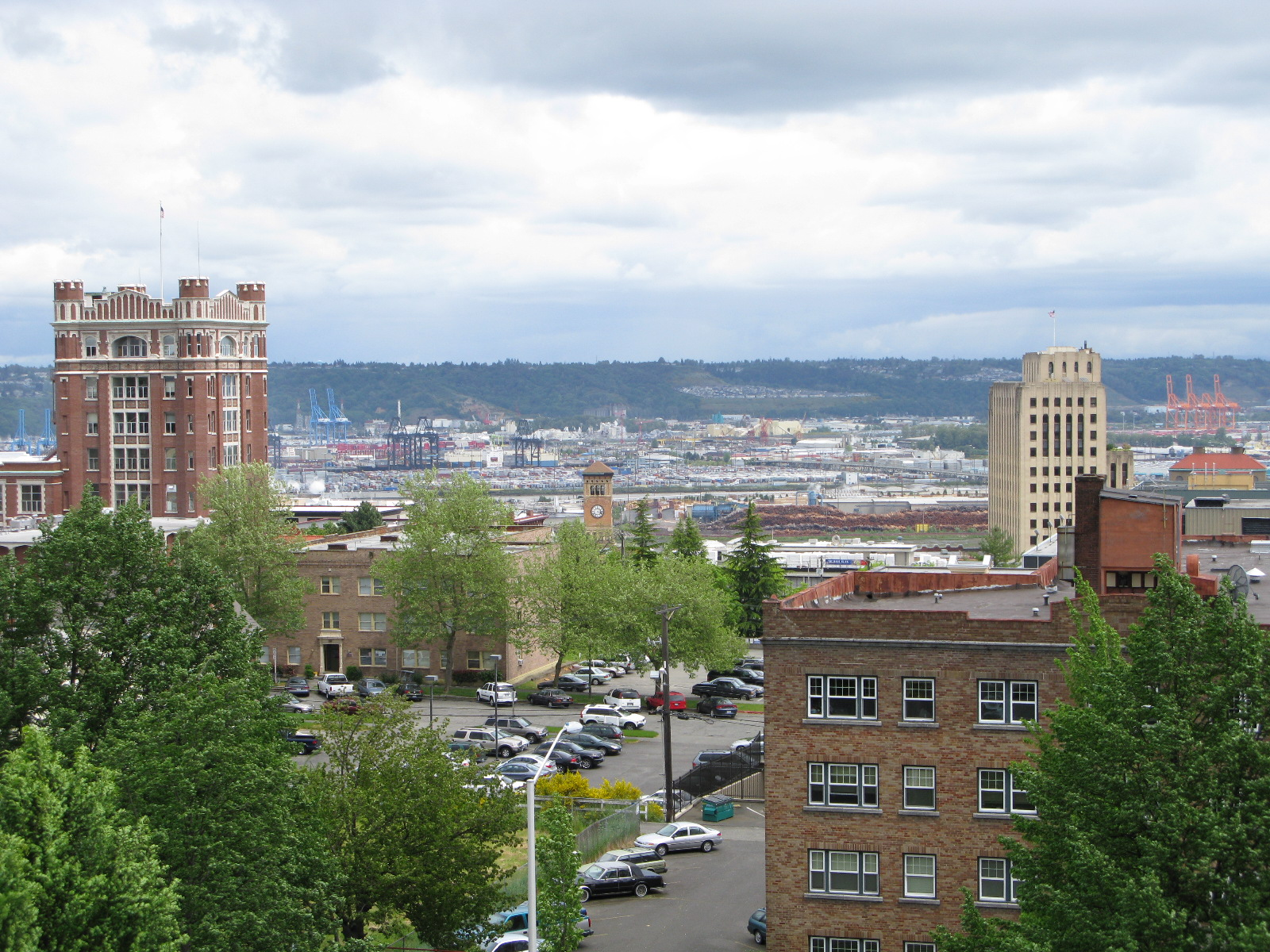
View from Tacoma's Hilltop

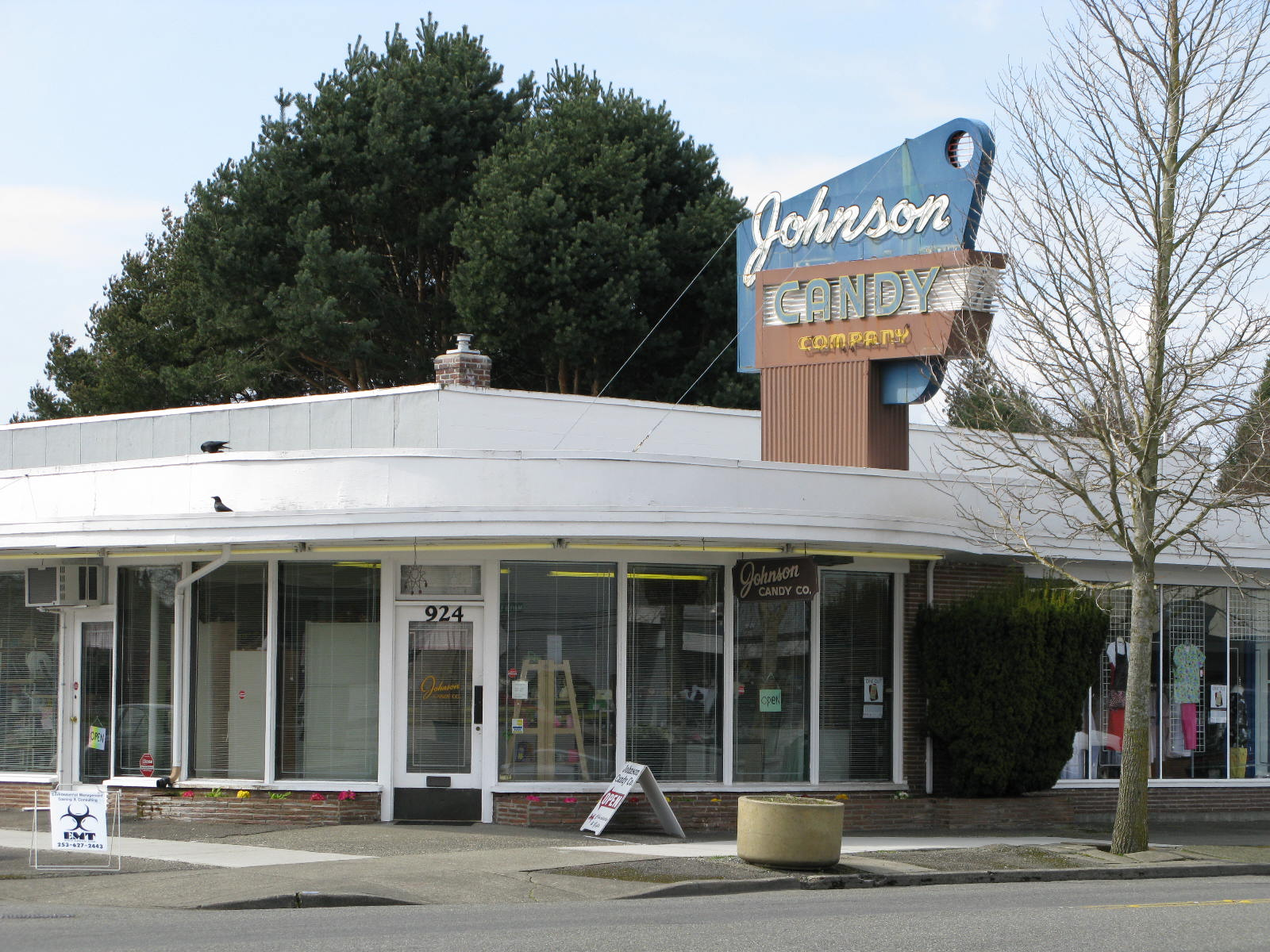
Johnson Candy Company in Tacoma's Hilltop Neighborhood

The National Register of Historic Places specifies the geographic area of Hilltop as located within the City of Tacoma and bounded on the east by Tacoma Avenue South, on the north by Division Avenue, on the west by Sprague Avenue, and on the south by the edge of the bluff, which roughly equates to South 27th Street. Hilltop derives its name from its location on a high bluff overlooking Commencement Bay and the Port of Tacoma.

Hilltop is near the historic Tacoma Public Library main branch, Bates Technical College, the Pierce County Courthouse, and the new Pierce County Correctional Facility, all of which are located on Hilltop's east side. Hilltop is also the home of the Evergreen State College's Tacoma Campus. It is adjoined by Tacoma's more affluent Stadium District.

The T Line, a streetcar operated by Sound Transit, runs through Hilltop on Martin Luther King Jr. Way, between Division Avenue and South 19th Street. It opened as an extension of the existing line in September 2023 and connects the neighborhood to the Stadium District and Downtown Tacoma.

== Past gang activity ==
The Hilltop was once notorious for drug-related gang activity, most notably related to the infamous Hilltop Crips. The word "Hilltop" became synonymous specifically with Tacoma's gang problems, and more generally with urban pathologies associated with the US's crack epidemic.

The Hilltop gained a reputation for drugs and violence with the Mother's Day riots in the 1970s. In the early 1980s, Tacoma civic leaders sought federal dollars by accepting a large number of Cuban refugees after the Cuban Adjustment Act and the Cuban Relocation Program. Many of the Cubans were prison inmates released by Castro who violently took over the illicit drug trade on Tacoma’s Hilltop. Around 1984, an unknown Los Angeles Crip association began organizing local Hilltop youth to sell primarily powder and crack cocaine. A yearlong violent struggle between Cuban dealers and the Crips ensued. Eventually, Cubans involved in the drug trade were murdered or left town. By September 23, 1989, the Hilltop Crips had become powerful, with violence and homicides at a peak, and police departments overwhelmed. Hilltop made national news in 1989 when several United States Army Rangers got into a shootout with suspected gang members in what came to be known as the Ash Street shootout.

In 2002, it was reported that neighborhood watch efforts, increased police presence, commercial real estate development efforts along Martin Luther King Way, the creation of the Alcohol Impact Area and rising real estate values in all areas adjoining downtown Tacoma have served to lower the amount of crime in Hilltop. In 2022, Tacoma Police numbers indicated that the Hilltop neighborhood was seeing an increase in crime. Some residents and businesses wrote to city leaders to express their concerns about rising crime.

== Employers ==
Health care is a major employer in Hilltop, with the Hilltop's numerous hospitals and medical centers known as the 'Medical Mile'. This includes:

- MultiCare Tacoma General Hospital
- Mary Bridge Children's Hospital
- St Joseph Medical Center
- Kaiser Permanente's Tacoma Medical Center
- Community Health Care of Tacoma's Hilltop Regional Health Facility

== Education ==
Hilltop is served by three elementary schools: McCarver Elementary, Stanley Elementary, and Bryant Montessori, all part of Tacoma Public Schools. SOAR Academy, a public K-8 Charter School is also located on Tacoma's Hilltop.

The Evergreen State College's Tacoma Campus is located in the Hilltop neighborhood. The downtown campus of Bates Technical College is located on the border of Hilltop and downtown.

== Demographics ==
The neighborhood's population is 12,002 and remains racially diverse. 41% of residents are White, 30% Black or African-American, 12% Asian, 3% Native American, 1% Pacific Islander, 3% from other races, and 8% from two or more races. Hispanic or Latino of any race were 7% of the population. 32% of residents were below poverty line.

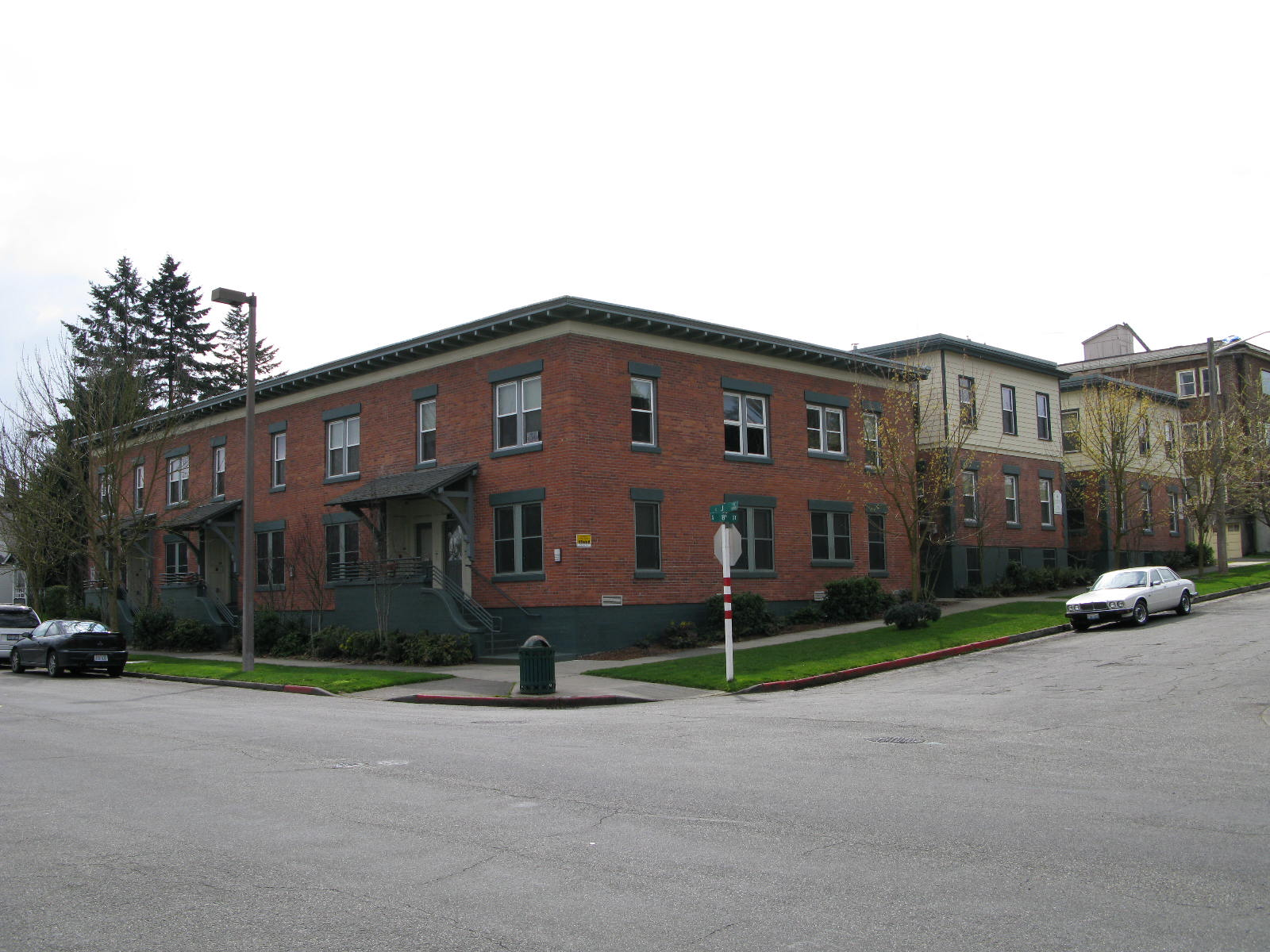
Brick apartment building in Tacoma's Hilltop neighborhood - South J Street

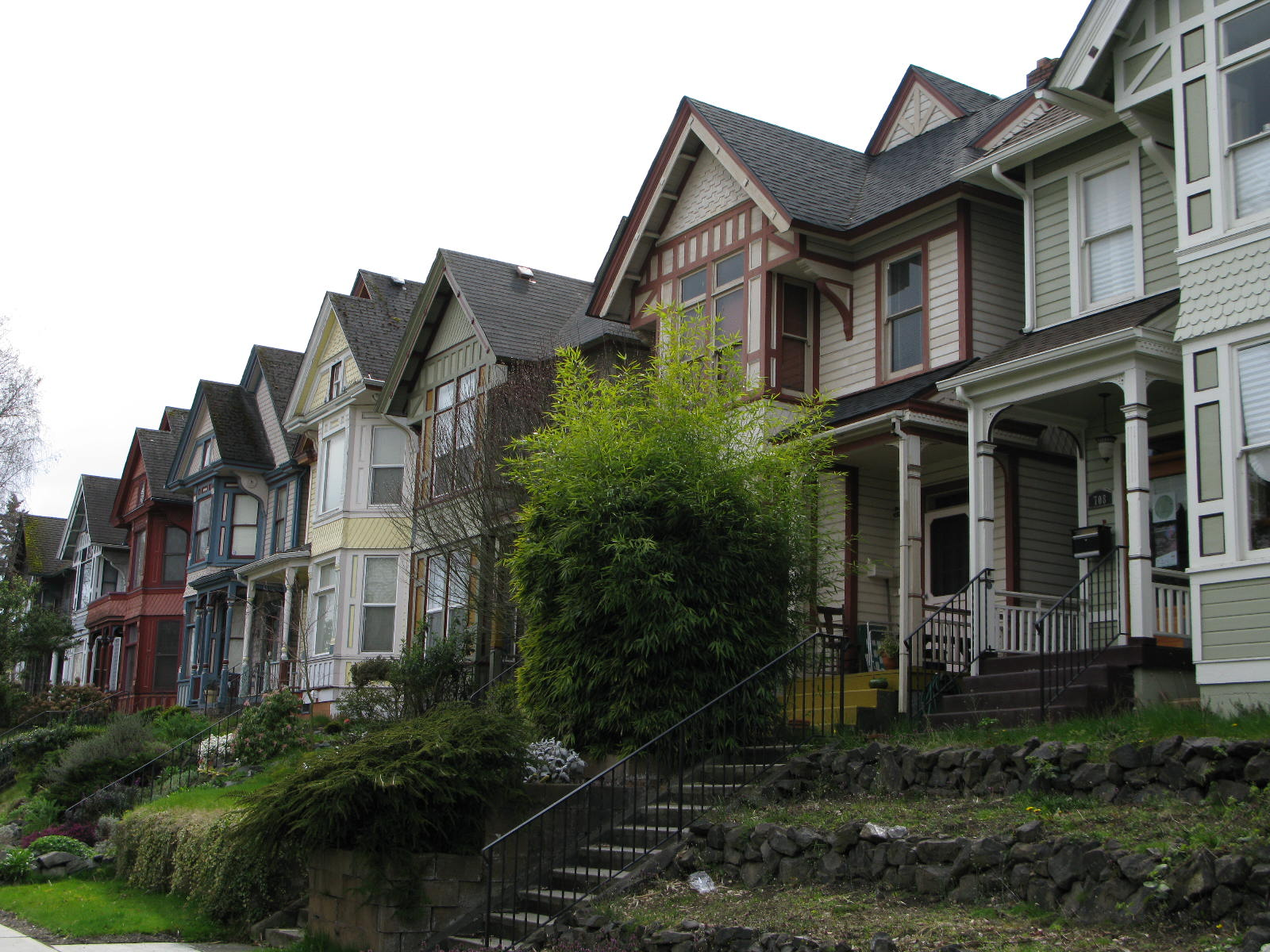
Historic Victorian Homes in Tacoma's Hilltop Neighborhood. Known as Doctor's Row on South J Street

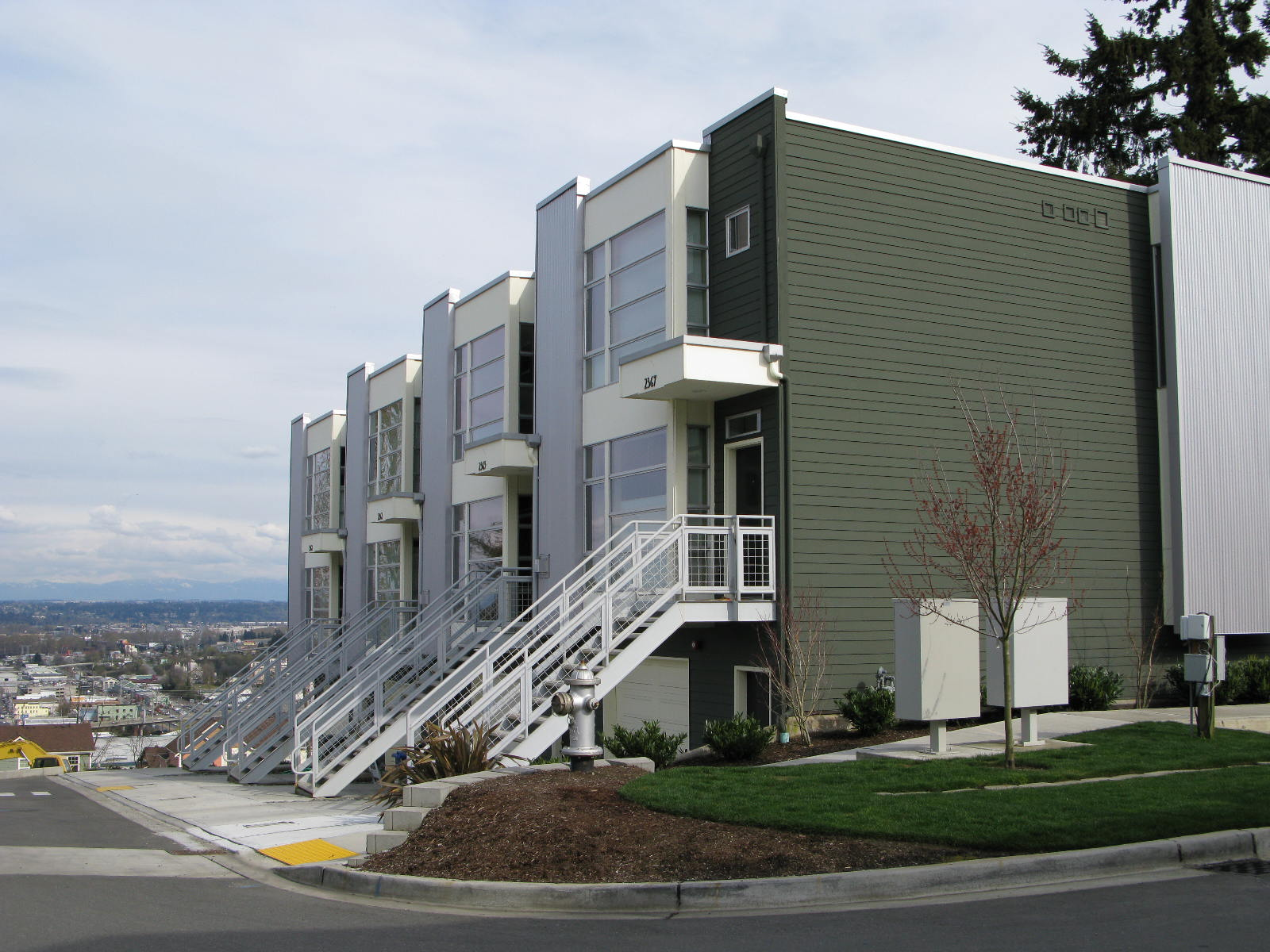
A townhome development in the McCarver area of Tacoma's Hilltop

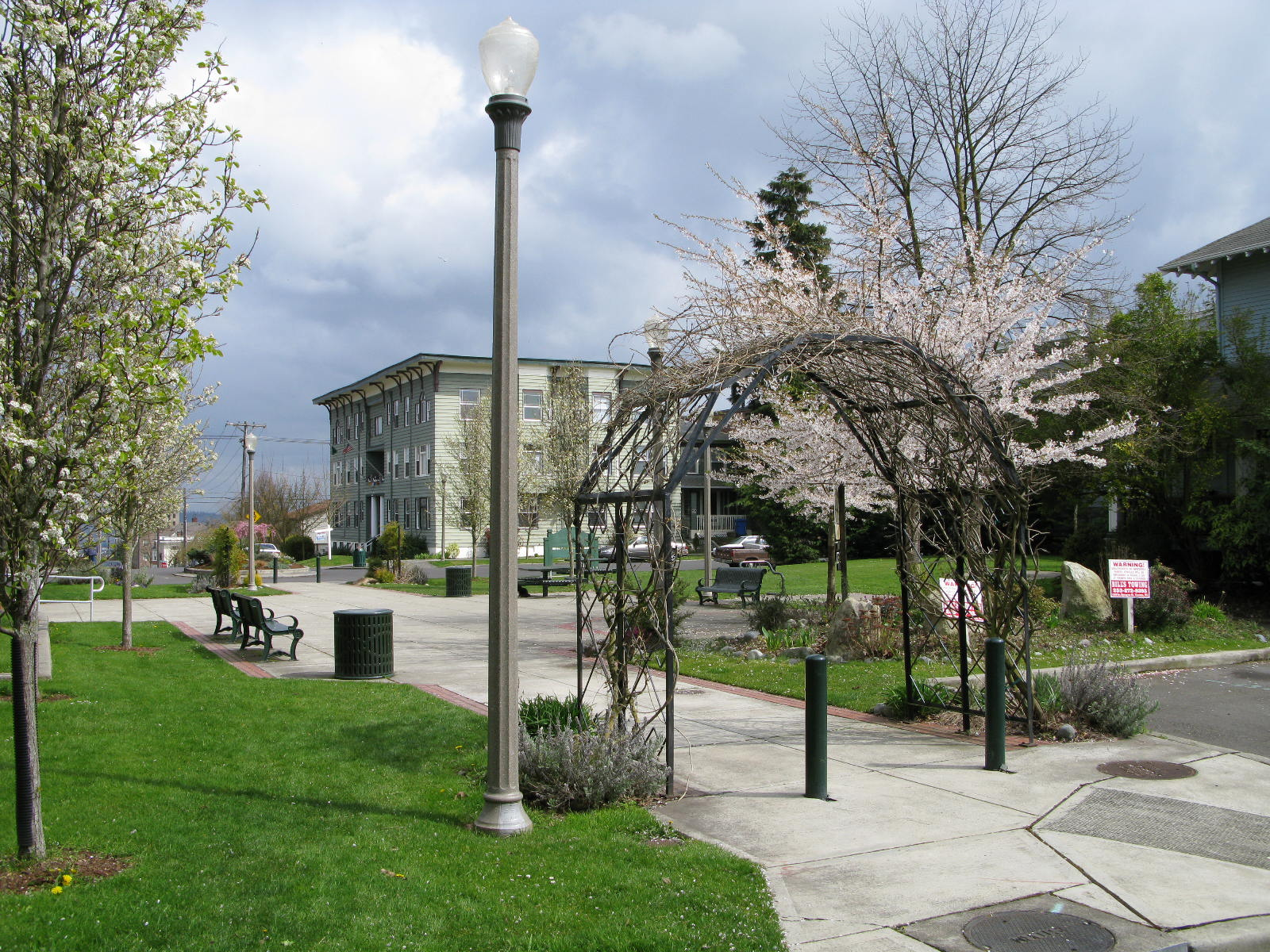
Neighbors Park, a small neighborhood park in Hilltop, Tacoma, WA

== Boundaries ==
In 2007, the Tacoma City Council adopted new official boundaries for downtown Tacoma which included a portion of the Hilltop neighborhood as far west as South L Street and changed the name of the Hilltop business district to the Upper Tacoma Business District, a name that local business owners had started using to avoid the gang and crime stigma associated with the name Hilltop, providing "a sort of witness protection program for the shopping district".

In 2011, the City Council recognized that Upper Tacoma was an outdated name. This followed a request from the Hilltop Business Association (formerly the Upper Tacoma Business Association), led by President Eric Crittendon, to reclaim the name Hilltop.

== Historic properties ==
- Engine House No. 4 (Tacoma, Washington) in Tacoma, Washington, at 220-224 E. 26th St., was built in 1911. It was listed on the National Register of Historic Places in 1984.
- South J Street—Victorian Row c. 1889, 702-722 South J Street, with the eight houses built in 1889 to 1890. It was listed on the National Register of Historic Places in 1986.
