= Bernard M. Banac =

Filipino police officer

- Born: Bernard M. Banac; September 26, 1970 (age 56)
- Education: Philippine Military Academy
- Police career
- Service: Philippine National Police
- Divisions: Deputy Chief for Administration; Area Police Command - Western Mindanao; Directorate for Police Community Relations; Directorate for Plans; PNP Special Action Force; Directorate for Information and Communications Technology Management (DICTM); Police Regional Office 8 (Eastern Visayas); PNP Training Service; PNP-Public Information Office/Office of Spokesperson, PNP; Sorsogon PPO; UN Peacekeeping Team
- Service years: 1988-2026
- Rank: Police Lieutenant General
- Badge no.: O-00507

Bernard Mollanida Banac (born September 26, 1970) is a retired Filipino police officer who served the Deputy Chief of Administration of the Philippine National Police (PNP). He assumed office on August 26, 2025 until his retirement on September 25, 2026, succeeding Police Lieutenant General Jose Melencio Nartatez Jr.

== Police career ==
Banac is one of the 2 youngest members of Philippine Military Academy Tanglaw-Diwa Class of 1992 alongside his classmate, Jose Melencio Nartatez Jr., Banac is assigned to the PNP Special Action Force (SAF). He also served as security aide of the Secretary of the Interior and Local Government Robert Barbers from 1996 to 1998. He was also served in assignments such as Greenhills Police precinct commander, officer-in-charge of QCPD–Kamuning Police Station (PS-10) from 2003 to 2004, and trainor of TABA Cops Program in Subic Bay from June 2004 to October 2005.

He also served as technical adviser to the United Nations Police Arms Embargo Cell from November 2005 to May 2007, which assigned to the UN mission in Abidjan, Ivory Coast. He also become a member of UN mission in Pristina, Kosovo from May 2008 to March 2009, as its operations and planning officer.

In 2012, Metrobank Foundation awarded Banac as one of the Country’s Outstanding Policemen in Service (COPS).

He was appointed as Sorsogon's Provincial Director in 2014 and later assumed as the Chief of the Internal Security Operations Division of Directorate for Operations. He also served as Chief of the Public Information Office and Spokesperson in 2019 where he and PNP Chief Archie Gamboa involved in Bell 429 helicopter crash in March 2020. In September 2020, he was assigned as director for PNP Training Service. In 2022, Banac became the Regional Director of Police Regional Office 8 where he oversees the security of National and Local Elections in Eastern Visayas in May 2022, and became the Directorate for Information and Communications Technology Management (DICTM) in August 2022 where he earned his two-star rank.

In November 2023, he returned in SAF as its commander, and served until May 8, 2024.

He was also assigned as head of Area Police Command–Western Mindanao, gained his rank of three-star. In August 2025, Banac became the Deputy Chief for Administration, the second highest position of the PNP.

=== Key Positions ===
- Member, United Nations (UN) Peacekeeping Team
- Provincial Director, Sorsogon Police Provincial Office
- Public Information Officer/Spokesperson, PNP
- Director, PNP Training Service
- Regional Director, Police Regional Office 8
- Director, Directorate for Information and Communications Technology Management (DICTM)
- Commander/Director, Special Action Force
- Director, Directorate for Plans
- Director, Directorate for Police Community Relations (DPCR)
- Commander, Area Police Command - Western Mindanao
- The Deputy Chief for Administration (TDCA), PNP
