= Special Operations Assault Rifle =

Special Operations Assault Rifle (SOAR)
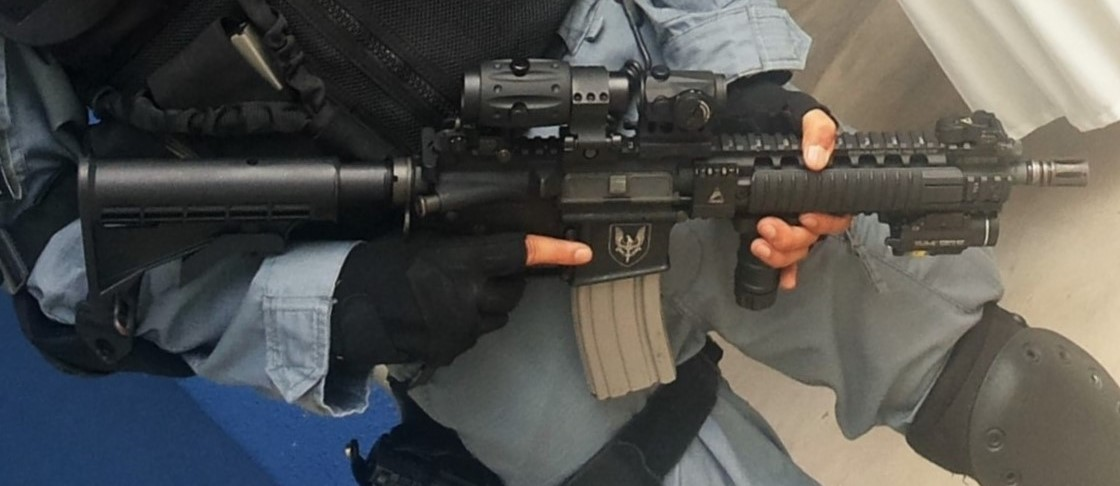
- SOAR of the Special Actions Unit (Malaysia)
- Type: Assault rifle
- Place of origin: United States

Service history
- In service: 2004–present
- Used by: See Users
- Wars: Papua Conflict; Communist Insurgencies; Islamic Insurgencies

Production history
- Designer: Ferdinand and Francis Sy
- Designed: 1998
- Manufacturer: FERFRANS
- Produced: 2004-present
- Variants: Variants

Specifications
- Cartridge: 5.56×45mm NATO
- Caliber: 5.56 mm (.223 in)
- Action: SOAR: Gas-operated, rotating bolt (direct impingement); SOAR-P: Short-stroke piston, rotating bolt
- Rate of fire: 550–680 round/min
- Feed system: Various STANAG magazines
- Sights: Iron sights or various optics

The Special Operations Assault Rifle (SOAR) is an assault rifle manufactured by FERFRANS and designed as an improvement of the M4 carbine.

== Details ==
The SOAR is a selective fire 5.56×45mm NATO assault rifle firing from either a closed rotating bolt (direct impingement) for the standard SOAR model, or in a short-stroke piston rotating bolt for the SOAR-P variant.

It differs from the typical M4 due to FERFRANS' preference to better control on full-automatic mode. Among the features include a patented Delayed Sear Activation System that reduces its cyclic rate of fire in full-auto to just around 550 to 680 rpm, reducing muzzle climb and improving control-ability.

The SOAR also uses a heavy machine gun barrel for increased reliability in sustained firing, rifled in either 1:7 or 1:9 right-hand twist.

== Variants ==
The SOAR is available in both the standard SOAR or the piston-driven SOAR-P.

=== SOAR (Standard variants) ===
Barrel length options for the SOAR are in 10.5", 11.5", 14.5", 16", 18", and 20" lengths.

Known upgrades are known as the 10.5 Mk2, 10.5 Mk2-2 and the 11 Mk2.

=== Piston variants ===
==== SOAR-P ====
SOAR-P (Piston) is the earlier piston variants of SOAR incorporated a short-stroke piston operating system with fully adjustable gas piston system. It's available in 10.5", 11.5", 14.5", 16", and 18" barrels.

==== SOAR IAR ====
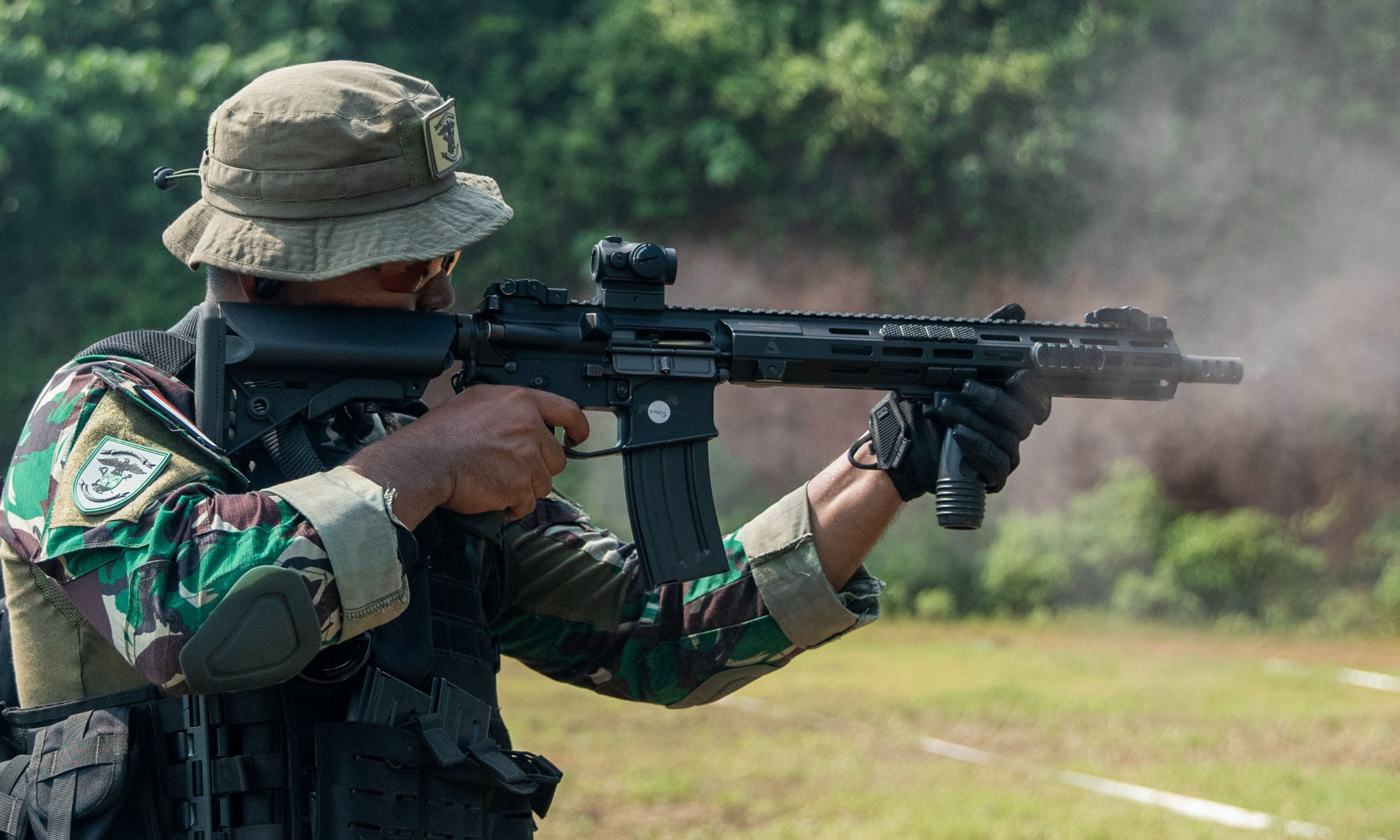
An Indonesian Marine soldier firing SOAR IAR in a Live-Fire Range during exercise CARAT 2024.

SOAR IAR (Infantry Assault Rifle) is the improvement version of piston variant, with 14.5-inch barrel assault rifle, 5.56x45mm cartridge, Short Stroke Piston operating system, and rate reducing system in full-auto mode in order to make full-auto fire controllable. It features M-LOK attachment system as part of the weapon's Mission Adaptable Handguard System (MAHS).

==== SOAR CQB ====
SOAR CQB (Close Quarter Battle) is 10-inch barrel assault carbine, with 5.56x45mm cartridge, short stroke piston system and rate reducing system, designated for CQB and counterterrorism operations.

==== SOAR SCW ====
SOAR SCW (Sub Compact Weapon) is a 7.5-inch barrel compact assault rifle using rate reduction system meant as the close gap between the 9x19mm submachine-gun that have low penetration and the 5.56x45mm personal defense weapon that have uncontrollably issue in full-auto fire mode during CQC or CQB operations, without needing to develop new rounds but using the existing 5.56×45mm caliber rounds.

Piston variants
Specifications	SOAR IAR	SOAR CQB	SOAR SCW
Caliber	5.56×45 mm		
Barrel length	14.5 in/ 36.8 cm, 16 in/ 40.6 cm	10.5 in/ 26.7 cm, 11.5 in	7.5 in/ 19.5 cm
Rate of fire	Fully Adjustable 550–850rpm		
Mode of Fire	Safe, Semi, Reduced Full-Auto		
Weight	8 lbs/ 3.6 kg w/o magazine, LPVO	7.5 lbs/ 3.40 kg	6.825 lbs/ 3.096 kg w/o magazine
Muzzle Velocity	2,800 ft/sec, 853 m/sec M855		2,303 ft/sec, 702 m/sec M855
Capacity	20, 30, 40, 60 round magazine	20, 30, 40 round magazine	
Length of Stock Retracted	32 in/ 81.28 cm	28 in/ 71.1 cm	24 in/ 60.9 cm
Length of Stock Extended	35.5 in/ 90.17 cm	31 in/ 78.7 cm	27.25 in/ 69.22 cm
Stock Position	3 point adjustable		

== Users ==
- Peru
- Philippines: Philippine Army Special Operations Command, PNP Special Action Force, Lapu-Lapu City SWAT.
- Indonesia: SOAR IAR used by the Marine Corps. SOAR SCW used by Kostrad Raider Infantry Battalion of the Indonesian Army.
- Malaysia: Limited use by Special Actions Unit of the Royal Malaysia Police
- Thailand: Limited use by Naval Special Warfare Command (Thailand) and Arintaraj 26
- United States: Limited use with some SWAT teams
- Vietnam: Limited use by Military Marksman Demonstration Team.
