= Special Action Force =

Elite military unit of the Philippine National Police

- Beret patch
- Active: May 16, 1983; 43 years ago
- Country: (Philippines)
- Agency: Philippine National Police
- Type: Police tactical unit, Special Forces
- Headquarters: Fort Santo Domingo, Santa Rosa, Laguna (main); Camp Bagong Diwa, Taguig, Metro Manila (camp)
- Motto: "By skill and virtue, we triumph"
- Abbreviation: SAF

Commanders
- Current commander: PBGen. Paul Kenneth T. Lucas

The Special Action Force (SAF) is a tactical unit of the Philippine National Police founded by Fidel V. Ramos, later the twelfth president of the Philippines, serving as a paramilitary counter-insurgency/terrorist unit.

== History ==
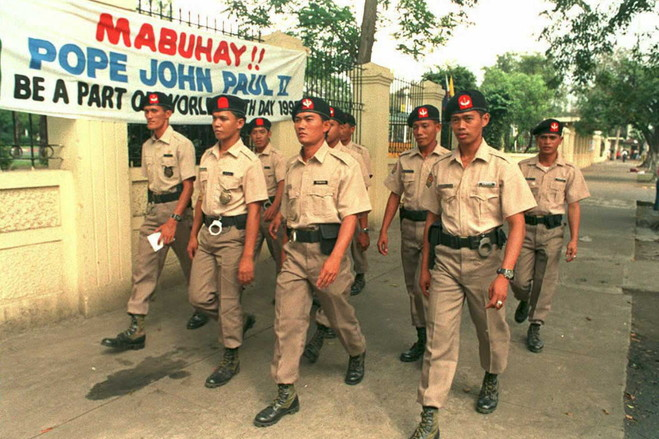
PNP SAF officers in 1995 on security duty for World Youth Day 1995

Formed on May 12, 1983, by the now-defunct Philippine Constabulary (PC) as the Philippine Constabulary Special Action Force (PCSAF) as per PC General Orders 323. The creation of the SAF was inspired by and "formed along the lines of" the British Army's Special Air Service (SAS). Fidel Ramos and Renato de Villa were the founders of the unit. De Villa directed Rosendo Ferrer and Avelino "Sonny" Razon Jr. to organize a Special Action Force. After which, a training program called the PCSAF Ranger Course, was used to train the 1st generation of SAF troopers, which had a number of 149 troopers. Out of them, 26 were commissioned officers with the others being enlisted personnel from a wide range of PC units such as the PC Brigade, the Long Range Patrol Battalion (LRP), the K-9 Support Company, PC Special Organized Group, the Light Reaction Unit (LRU) of PC MetroCom, the PC Off-Shore Action Command (COSAC) and other PC Units. Later on, they changed the name of the course to SAF Operations Course (SAFOC) then SAF Commando Course (SAFCC).

During the days of the EDSA Revolution in late February 1986, Ramos was involved in planning an operation called "Exercise Ligtas Isla" ("Exercise Save Island") in case either First Lady Imelda Marcos or Armed Forces of the Philippines Chief of Staff General Fabián Ver would take over as ruler from President Marcos, who had already been ill by that time. When Corazon Aquino acceded to the presidency, the SAF were mandated to be on standby due to the several coup attempts by rogue Philippine soldiers throughout her rule.

On January 29, 1991, President Aquino signed Republic Act 6975 into law, which changed the name of the SAF from PCSAF to PNPSAF as a part of transition of government.

In 2008, it was reported that the SAF moved to a permanent camp at Barangay Pinugay, Baras, Rizal under Proclamation No. 1355 passed in August 2007.

For the first time, SAF troopers were involved in the Balikatan exercises in 2009 since American and Filipino troops are usually involved.

On July 20, 2016, SAF created NBP Facility Security Provisional Battalion led by PSUPT Ledon Monte to take over from the Bureau of Corrections the duties to man the New Bilibid Prison, particularly in the Maximum Security Camp where big-time drug lords and hardened prisoners are held.

The PNP has approved the creation of five more Special Action Battalions to the SAF in 2017.

In June 2018, the SAF would undergo additional urban warfare training as part of lessons learned from the Marawi crisis.

In 2019, the SAF witnessed the beefing-up of its Air Unit with the operationalization of 9 new helicopters (7 Airbus H125 and 2 Robinson R44 Raven II units). On June 29, 2021, the Air Unit was transferred to the Office of the Chief, PNP as prescribed under NAPOLCOM Resolution Number 2021-0720. This was in line in the PNP's 2020 Annual Report in an effort to ensure the force's organizational effectiveness, air support and mobility.

=== Known operations ===
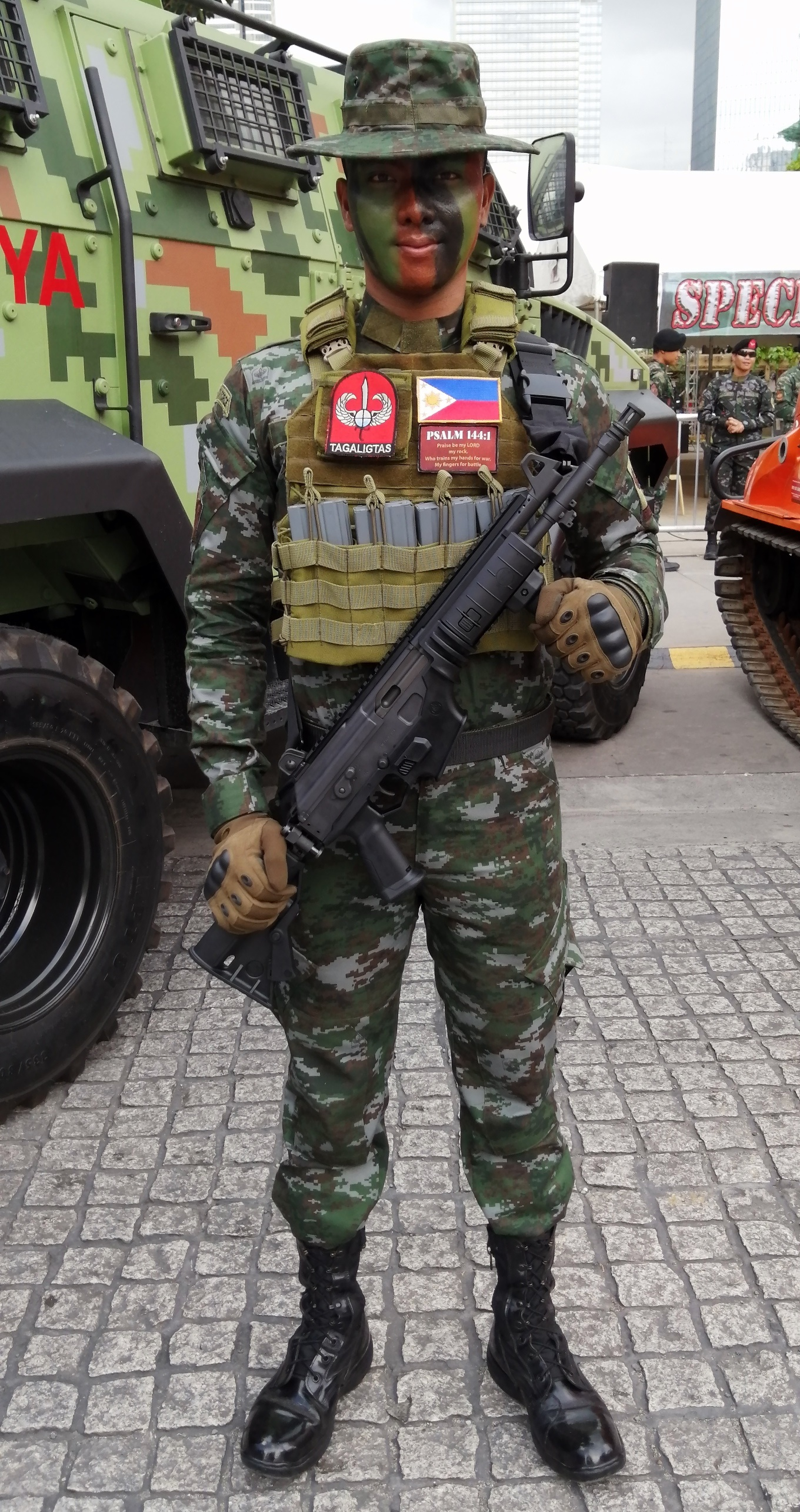
A member of the Special Action Force (SAF) in full battle gear. Photo taken during the SAF 36th Anniversary Capability and Skills Exhibit at Bonifacio Global City (BGC).

- February 1986: People Power Revolution.
- 1986 to 1989 - SAF Conducted anti-coup operations against anti-government rebels from the Philippine military.
- Late 1980s to 1990s - First deployed to battle against NPA and MNLF rebels.
- May 1987 - Then PCSAF under MAJOR Avelino Razon, Jr was deployed in Ifugao to conduct operations against the CPP-NPA.
- 1987 - Two Special Action Companies (SACs) were deployed in Negros Island and conducted successful operations against the NPAs. It caused the surrender of considerable numbers of the NPA operating in Negros Oriental. The 2SAC and 4SAC were led by 1LT Noli Talino (2SAC) and (4SAC)1LT Josephus Angan and 1LT Ramón Mateo Dizon, who later became Brigadier General and PSG Commander under President Benigno Aquino III.
- 1992 - Newly created 4SAB under PSUPT Abraham Garcillano and PCINSP Emmanuel Caeg was placed attached with the Western Police District to assist in neutralizing criminal elements involved in robbery/hold-up of banks and pawnshops, including armored cars. 1SAC led by PINSP Adriático del Camat and PINSP Bernard Banac was deployed in Ermita, Manila, while the 2SAC led by PINSP Constancio Item and PINSP Bernardo Rosario was deployed in Sampaloc, Manila.
- 1993 - The 3SAB was deployed in Basilan to go after notorious bandits and KFR groups.
- March 15, 1993 - A team of SAF Troopers led by PINSP Clemente Vargas and PINSP Bernardo Rosario discovered NPA killing fields in Brgy Kalabigan Hills, Marag Valley, Luna, Kalinga-Apayao.
- 1994 - The 1SAB led by PCINSO Ager Ontog, 2SAB led by PCINSP Jaime Calungsod and Special Operations Battalion (SOB) Deep Reconnaissance Company (DEER) led by PINSP Bernard Banac and PINSP Rodolfo Castil, Jr replaced the 3SAB under PCINSP Bai Layon in Basilan with primary function to restore peace and order and conduct operation against the Abu Sayyaf.
- 1994 - PSUPT Samson Tucay, Commander, SOB sent the Light Armor Coy "Bubuyog" led by PINSP Bernardo Rosario and PINSP Ramil Montilla to Zamboanga and Basilan to provide fire support to SAF units under the Mindanao Police Task Force (MPTF).
- 1994 - PINSP Joseph Plaza and PINSP Parena were among those who headed the SAF Training Group in Basilan to conduct SAFOC.
- October 1994 - Two teams from 2SAB led by PINSP César Pasiwen and PINSP Cris Mendoza neutralized Commander "Arabain" in Tuburan, Basilan.
- October 1994 - The 1SAB was deployed in Region 12 with its Battalion HQ in Sultan Kudarat.
- October 1994 - The 1SAC, 1SAB under PINSP Willy Cayat backed by 2SAC under PINSO Tellio Ngis-o successfully took over the Malitubog-Maridagao Irrigation project from a Muslim rebel group led by Commander "Damskie". PINSP Victor Arévalo and other PNCOs were wounded during the operation. A bomb technician expert who was recovering/disarming anti-personnel mines was killed by a sniper fire.
- December 1994 - The 2SAC led by PINSP Ngis-o with Junior Officers PInsp Argel Ancheta, PInsp Jech Abecia, PInsp Chito Bersaluna, PInsp Kirby John Kraft, PInsp Ricardo Javier, PInsp Jacob Macabali, PInsp James Cristobal Coy Ex-O and PInsp Joel Limson, Chief of Police of Carmen MPS in Cotabato with support from 3SAC, successfully liberated the barangays of Tupig and Tonganon, Carmen, Cotabato from the control of the Muslim rebel group that occupied the villages after they were displaced from Malitubog-Maridagao Dam. PO2s Ycoy and Pellobello who were part of the Blocking Force were killed in the said operations. The 2SAC, 1SAB was awarded as Best Operating Company by the Regional Police Office 12.
- June 1995 - Composite personnel from 1SAB, 2SAB, 3SAB,4SAB, SOB DEER COY led by PINSP Bernard Banac and PINSP Rodolfo Castil, Jr and SOB "Bubuyog" LAC, led by PINSP Bernardo Rosario and PINSP Ramil Montilla were deployed to Negros Island as primary component of Negros Island Police Task Force.
- September 1996 - The 3SAB under PCINSP Román Félix was deployed in SBMA-Bataan area to conduct clearing operations as part of security preparation for APEC. 31SAC was attached to 24th IB, Philippine Army under Major Emmanuel Bautista to conduct joint combat raids in the towns of Balanga and Orion, Bataan and nearby areas. It was transferred to Mauban, Quezon to support the local police.
- March 1995 - The RECON COY under PSINSP Ronald Santos was deployed to Nueva Ecija for election duty and was responsible for many accomplishments including the arrest of Mayor Joson and his 13 bodyguards, who were responsible for the killing of his political rival Mayor Pérez.
- 1997 - The RECON COY under PSINSP Willy Cayat was deployed to Davao del Norte at Mount Diwalwal to restore peace and order and conduct police operation against use of explosive components by miners in their operation of mining gold in Mount Diwalwal.
- 1997 to 2000 - The 1SAB under PSUPT Benjamin Magalong figured in numerous special operations such as arrests and raids on high-profile lawless elements and hostage rescue operations in cooperation with Presidential Anti-Organized Crime Task Force (PAOCTF). Its Counter-Terrorist Unit also figured in series of raids against NPA that resulted in the neutralization of some of NPA leaders.
- August 4, 2000 two teams of SAF LRU of PAOCTF Luzon led by PSINSP Edgar Alan Okubo and PSINSP Félix Servita, Jr engaged eight fully armed robbers of the Danny Flores Gang after a hot pursuit operation in Alabang, Muntinlupa resulting in the killing of four suspects and arrest of four others and the recovery of six high powered long firearms and five handguns. One SAF trooper was KIA.
- July 27, 2003 - SAF EOD experts were deployed to Makati during the Oakwood Mutiny.
- August 25, 2003 - SAF units were deployed in Makati after heavily armed bank robbers attacked the headquarters of Citibank Philippines.
- September 23, 2003 - A joint raid by the SAF, CIDG, Intelligence Group (IG), Traffic Management Group, Intelligence Service of the Armed Forces of the Philippines (ISAFP), Army Intelligence and Security Group (AISG) and Marines assaulted Palar Village in Taguig, netting a bank robbery gang made up of ex-Armed Forces soldiers believed to have been responsible for the earlier Citibank Philippines robbery.
- September 28, 2003 - SAF provided Quick Reaction Forces for protection of US President George W. Bush during his state visit to the country.
- October 2, 2003 - SAF arrested Jemaah Islamiyah terrorist Taofek Refke.
- March 10, 2004 - SAF teams engaged NPA guerrillas in a gunfight alongside soldiers of the Army's 24th Infantry Battalion at Sitio Caarosipan, Barangay Apóstol, San Felipe, Zambales. Eight NPA guerrillas were confirmed killed. A SAF officer was KIA, while three were WIA.
- April 28, 2004 - Arrest of Abu Sayyaf terrorists in the Muslim community in Culiat, Quezon City.
- March 18, 2004 - The SAF Commando Cl-27 composed the 24SAC, 2SAB who were deployed to Cotabato (Buliok Complex) as requested by Governor Emmanuel Pinol to serve as a peace negotiator between the government and the MILF rebels. They also served as security during the 2004 presidential election in the province.
- May 31, 2004 - SAF protected ballot boxes used in the May 10 general election.
- June 11, 2004 - SAF teams were deployed in a resettlement area in Taguig, after reports of snipers were sent to the PNP.
- June 20, 2004 - A SAF officer was killed when SAF and the Zambales Police Provincial Mobile Group engaged the NPA in a firefight in Zambales.
- July 17, 2004 - A group of phone hackers, consisting of Filipino and foreign nationals, were arrested in a raid conducted by the SAF.
- July 28, 2004 - The SAF provided security for former Abu Sayyaf hostage Gracia Burnham who testified against said terrorist group in a local courthouse.
- September 27, 2004 - SAF teams were deployed in the Cordillera to disarm various Partisan Armed Group (PAG) gunmen in the employ of several local prominent politicians.
- January 30, 2005 - SAF arrested various members of a kidnap-for-ransom gang in Batangas City.
- February 10, 2005 - SAF arrested members of a bank robbery gang during a raid in the City of San Fernando, Pampanga.
- March 15, 2005 - SAF and NCRPO SWAT teams led by PSSUPT Benjamin Magalong raided the Metro Manila Rehabilitation Center of the Bureau of Jail Management and Penology in Camp Bagong Diwa, Taguig City after it was captured by Abu Sayyaf inmates. Among those killed were Alhamser Limbong (alias "Commander Kosovo"), Ghalib Andang (alias "Commander Robot"), Nadzmi Sabdullah (alias "Commander Global"), and Sadit Abdul Ganit Husim (alias "Commander Lando"). For a short time, various human rights group in the Philippines and abroad have accused the SAF of police brutality and were convinced that the PNP really wanted to kill them at the start of the crisis. PNP officials have denied all charges. Various foreign groups abroad (possibly other special ops units) have praised the SAF for bringing a quick end to the 30-hour crisis. This was one of the SAF's publicly known operations to be on the headlines on newspapers and on TV news reports worldwide, especially on CNN. PO1 Abel Arreola was the only SAF operative killed during the attack.
- February 17, 2006 - SAF units were deployed to Southern Leyte as part of a humanitarian contingent of the PNP.
- February 21, 2006 - SAF units patrolled the grounds of Malacañan Palace after an explosion within the palace complex. The explosive was said to have been placed in a waste bin.
- February 24, 2006 - SAF units were on red alert after a coup plot was uncovered.
- October 9, 2006 - SAF units were deployed to Negros Occidental after New People's Army rebels attacked the Silay City airport.
- January 11 to 14, 2007 - SAF units were deployed to Mandaue in Metro Cebu to protect heads of state and government gathered for the 12th ASEAN Summit.
- October 26, 2007 - PSINSP Fermar Ordiz, a PNP SAF operative, was shot and killed by robbers in Cubao, Quezon City during a shootout despite wearing a kevlar vest.
- November 29, 2007 - SAF helped in preventing the Manila Peninsula rebellion by arresting the renegade soldiers including Army BGEN Danilo Lim.
- June 13, 2007 - PO2 Marlon Buslig, a PNP SAF operative, was KIA by Abu Sayyaf members in Indanan, Sulu during a combat operation despite wearing a kevlar vest.
- December 5, 2008 - The Parañaque shootout between the SAF and the Waray-Waray gangs which led to death of 16 people, including one SAF member named PO1 Nixon Vinasoy. It was the most controversial mission conducted by the SAF due to the death of two civilians, including a 7-year-old girl, caused by the SAF team.
- September 26 to 30, 2009 - Heroic Acts of Special Action Force 61ST Calamity Assistance Rescue Recovery Relief and Emergency (CARE) Company of Force Support Battalion (FSB) under PCINSP Byron Tabernilla. On that day, the SAF Troopers of CARE manifested through actions their battle cry and mission statement "MAGHANAP-SUMAGIP-MAGLIGTAS". A huge number of people hit by Typhoon Ketsana, locally named as "Ondoy", were rescued around heavily flooded parts of Metropolitan Manila such as Marikina. Among those rescued in Provident Village in Marikina were actress Cristine Reyes and actor Richard Gutiérrez.
- April 20, 2010 - Four SAF Troopers were KIA during an ambush by the NPA in Antipolo, Rizal while five other troopers were WIA.
- May 27, 2013 - Eight SAF Troopers were killed while seven other troopers were wounded during an ambush perpetrated by the NPA in Allacapan, Cagayan.
- September 9 to 28, 2013 - Zamboanga Siege - the 55SAC of 5SAB and 84SAC of RDB were among the first government troops to respond to the attack made by elements of a rogue MNLF faction. They prevented attackers from going further to the heart of the city. Three SAF Troopers, PO2 Christopher Hernáez of 55SAC and PO2s Lawin Salisa and Enrique Afable of 84SAC, were KIA. A total of 25 government troopers were KIA while 183 members of said faction were KIA and 292 others were captured.
- January 25, 2015 - 44 members of the PNP-Special Action Force were killed by an estimated 800 members of Local Terrorist Groups, Bangsamoro Islamic Freedom Fighters, Moro Islamic Liberation Front and local criminal groups in Mamasapano, Maguindanao, while 12 other troopers were WIA. Among the 44 who were KIA, 35 were from 55SAC, 5SAB while nine from 84SAC, RDB. It was believed that an estimate of more than 200 LTGs were KIA due to the close proximity of the firefight although only 17 was reported. All 44 SAF Troopers were posthumously awarded the Medal of Valor.
- May 23, 2017 to October 23, 2017 - a Composite SAF Contingent was sent to augment government forces to clear Marawi City of an estimated 1,000 members of ISIS-inspired and combined Maute and Abu Sayyaf Local Terrorist Groups (LTGs). For five months, the contingent directly confronted the enemy at the Main Battle Area where they fought side by side with the elite forces of the AFP in neutralizing said LTGs. They provided Assault Teams, Sniper Teams, Weapons Teams, LAC Teams and Seaborne Teams. The contingent was led by PSUPT Rex Arvin Malimban. It was composed of personnel mostly from the CTU Companies of the line battalions such as 83SAC (CRG) and 84SAC (Seaborne) of the RDB led by PSUPT Lambert Suerte, 103SAC and 15SAC of 1SAB led by PSUPT Jack Angog, 25SAC of 2SAB led by PSUPT Mario Mayames, Jr, composite company mostly from 55SAC of 5SAB led by PSUPT Ledon Monte. 4SAB and SAFTB (Commando Cl-77 as test mission) also sent personnel. Four were KIA: PO3 Alexis Mangaldan (5SAB), PO1 Moises Kimayong (SAFTB), PO2 Alexis Laurente (1SAB) and PO2 Daniel Tegwa (SAFTB). For their gallantry in action, the four were awarded the Order of Lapu-Lapu's Kalasag Medal.
- October - November 2020 New Bilibid Prison riots - The SAF, together with the Philippine SWAT and the Bureau of Corrections, were instrumental in quelling a prison riot ignited by the infamous Sigue Sigue Sputnik gang.

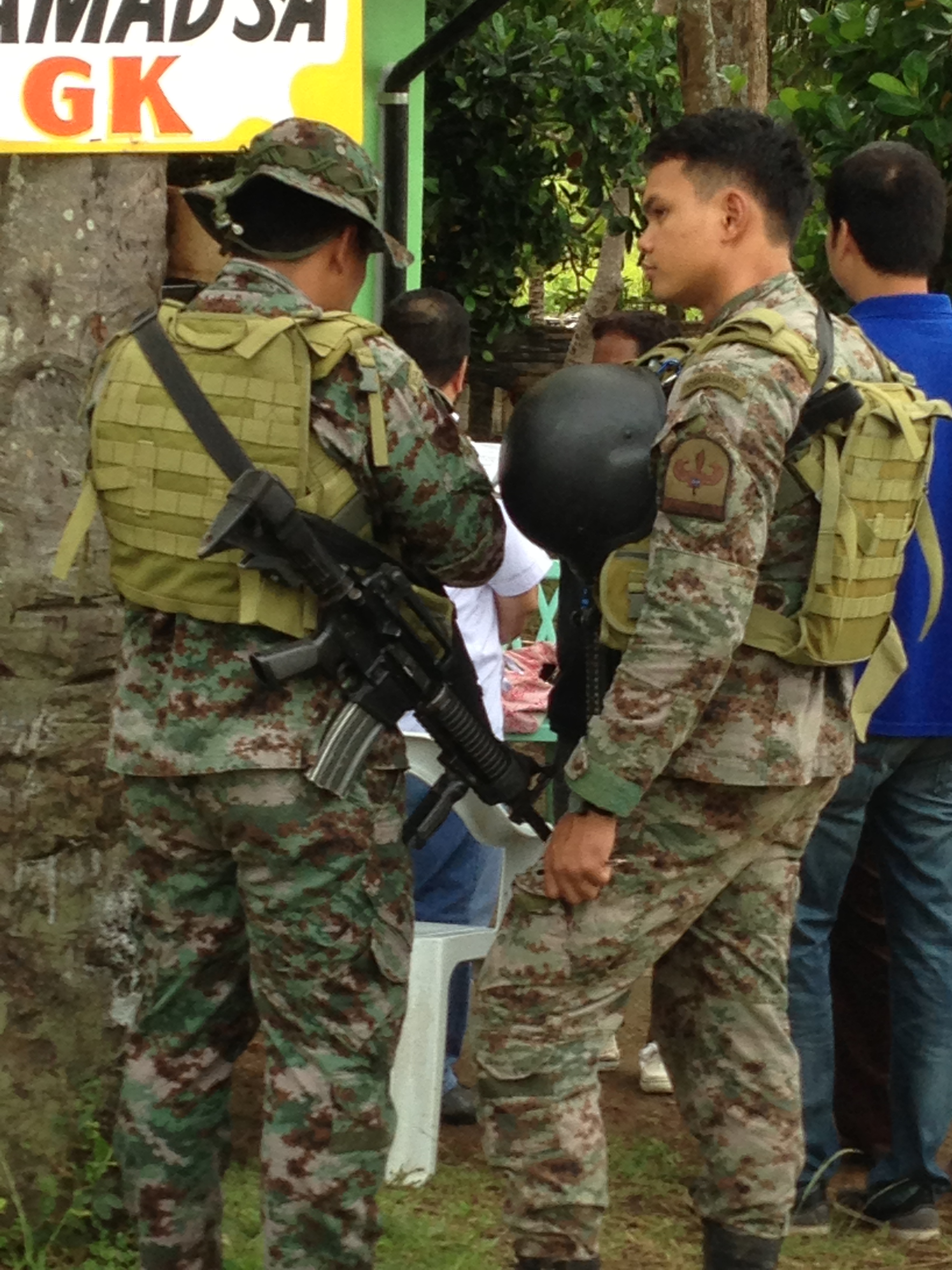
Philippine National Police Special Action Force operators in combat gear, including digital camouflage uniforms while conducting protection duties in Masbate during a Gawad Kalinga activity.

== Structure ==
As of 2021, the SAF's command structure consists of the following:

- Headquarters
- Force Support Battalion
- Rapid Deployment Battalion
- Twelve Special Action Force Battalions: 1SAB, 2SAB, 3SAB, 4SAB, 5SAB, 6SAB, 7SAB, 9SAB, 10SAB, 11SAB, 12SAB, 14SAB
- Training Branch

== Training ==
Prior to recruitment, prospective SAF candidates must be recruited into the PNP with the rank of Police Officer 1 (PO1), now Patrolman as of 2022. This would be followed by a six-month basic public safety course at the National Police Training Institute with field training done in the streets of the Philippines. The latter requirement was dropped as of 2018 because of concerns that new officers having field training would be exposed to bad and corrupt practices.

SAF candidates then need to attend the SAF Commando Course (or equivalent training such as Scout Ranger Course, Force Reconnaissance Course, Special Forces Operations Course) to be allowed to wear the SAF Beret. The course includes modules in internal security operations, waterborne rescue, police intervention, barangay module and operational testing, followed by a field training exercise.

After completing the commando course, SAF operators are allowed to take specialized training such as explosives and ordnance disposal (EOD), Basic Airborne Course (BAC), Urban Counter Revolutionary Warfare Course (UCRWC or SURESHOCK), K-9 Training Course, Sniper Course, Basic Mechanized Operation Course (BMOC), Sniper Course (SAFS), Intelligence Basic Course (IBC), Parachute Packing Course (PPC), SCUBA-BUSROC (Basic Underwater Search and Rescue Operations Course), the maritime tactical operation course and the SAF Seaborne Warfare Course (SSWC). For MTOC, SAF operators must have SURESHOCK and Airborne qualifications before being considered.

Training occurs at the unit's headquarters in Cuartel de Santo Domingo, Santa Rosa, Laguna.

A test mission will be done to see how the prospective SAF operators would do in a firefight before being fully inducted to the unit.

=== Foreign training ===
The SAF has conducted cross training with the 1st Special Forces Group. Training was also provided from the Hostage Rescue Team (HRT), Critical Incident Response Group (CIRG), RAID, Yamam and the LAPD SWAT team.

The SAF was trained through the US State Department's Anti-Terrorism Assistance (ATA) program.

== Functions ==
As designated by the Philippine National Police, the missions of the Special Action Force are the following:

- To develop, organise and train organic personnel in the furtherance of the assigned mission.
- To conduct Counter-Terrorist operations in urban and rural areas.
- To conduct search and rescue operations anywhere in the country during calamities and catastrophes.
- To conduct civil disturbance management (CDM) operations and address the requirements of stability and security operations in times of civil disobedience on a national scale.
- To operate as a rapid deployment force ready and capable to act anytime and anywhere in the country in support of other units and other agencies as higher headquarters may direct.
- To perform other tasks as the Chief PNP may direct.
- To maintain a reasonable degree of law and order in the national highways and major thoroughfares

== Equipment ==
=== Pistols ===
Picture	Model	Origin	Type	Caliber	Version	Notes
	Glock 17	Austria	Semi-automatic pistol	9×19mm Parabellum		Standard-issue pistol of the Philippine National Police since 2013.
	Taurus TS9	Brazil	Semi-automatic pistol	9×19mm Parabellum	TS9 Striker	Standard-issue pistol of the Philippine National Police since 2019.
	SYS Canik TP9	Turkey	Semi-automatic pistol	9×19mm Parabellum	TP9SF	Alternative standard-issue pistol of the PNP, some were distributed to the SAF.
	TİSAŞ Zigana	Turkey	Semi-automatic pistol	9×19mm Parabellum	Zigana P9L	168 units received by SAF in 2018.
	IWI Masada	Israel	Semi-automatic pistol	9×19mm Parabellum	Masada	Alternative standard-issue pistol of the PNP, some were distributed to the SAF.
	Beretta 92	Italy	Semi-automatic pistol	9×19mm Parabellum	92F	Standard-issue pistol of the Philippine National Police.
	M1911 pistol	United States / Philippines	Semi-automatic pistol	.45 ACP	M1911	Former standard-issue pistol of the Philippine National Police, sourced from US EDA and new Philippine-made units. US-made variants mostly handed-over from the Philippine Constabulary and Integrated National Police.

=== Submachine guns ===
Picture	Model	Origin	Type	Caliber	Version	Notes
	CZ Scorpion Evo 3	Czech Republic	Submachine gun	9×19mm Parabellum	Evo 3A1	Acquired 72 units, formally received on 7 August 2019.
	IWI Tavor X95	Israel	Submachine gun	9×19mm Parabellum	X95-S SMG	PNP to acquire 743 units to replace ordered but undelivered Kriss Vector SMGs, several were issued to the PNP-SAF.
	Ferfrans SCW	United States	Submachine gun	5.56×45mm NATO	SCW 7	Previously known as PDW. AR-15 based but uses a short 7.5" barrel
	Heckler & Koch UMP	Germany	Submachine gun	9×19mm Parabellum.45 ACP	UMP-9 UMP-45	
	FN P90	Belgium	Submachine gun	FN 5.7×28mm	P90	Acquired in limited numbers.
	Heckler & Koch MP5	Germany / Pakistan	Submachine gun	9×19mm Parabellum	MP5A3 MP5A5 MP5K	Several sourced from Pakistan.
	Uzi	Israel	Submachine gun	9×19mm Parabellum	Uzi Submachine Gun	Known to be used in the 1980s.

=== Shotguns ===
Picture	Model	Origin	Type	Caliber	Version	Notes
	Catma Arms S501	Turkey	Shotgun	12 gauge	S 501	105 units formally received 9 August 2019.
	Mossberg 500	United States	Shotgun	12 gauge		
	Remington Model 870	United States	Shotgun	12 gauge		

=== Rifles and carbines ===
Picture	Model	Origin	Type	Caliber	Version	Notes
	M16 rifle	United States / Philippines	Assault rifle	5.56×45mm NATO	M16A1	Current standard-issue rifle, either made by Colt USA or Elisco Tool (Elitool) Philippines. 30,000 units were handed-over to the PNP on loan from the Armed Forces of the Philippines, several are with the PNP-SAF.
	IWI Galil ACE	Israel	Assault rifle	5.56×45mm NATO	Galil ACE-N 22	More than 8,000 units acquired by PNP in 2018, some were handed over to the SAF.
	FAMAS	France	Assault rifle	5.56×45mm NATO	FAMAS G2	Acquired in limited numbers in the late 1990s.
	IMI Galil	Israel	Assault rifle	5.56×45mm NATO	AR SAR	Formerly from the Philippine Constabulary.
	M4 carbine	United States / Philippines	Carbine	5.56×45mm NATO	M4A1 LMT MRP 11 Ferfrans M4A1 || Colt M4A1s acquired from the US. Ferfrans refurbished almost 1,000 units of unserviceable Colt-Elitool M16A1 to specialized M4 standard. Several are used by the PNP-SAF.	
	FERFRANS SOAR	Philippines	Carbine	5.56×45mm NATO	SOAR 11 SOAR 14 SOAR-P 11 SOAR-P 14	Similar to the M4 carbine, developed by FERFRANS using patented components and US-made parts, including a reduced rate of fire and use of a 1:9 twist barrel instead of the usual 1:7 twist on standard M4. SOAR 11 uses an 11.5" barrel, while SOAR 14 uses a 14.5" barrel. SOAR-P is a piston version of the rifle. Used by the SAF.
	FERFRANS M16PNP11	Philippines	Carbine	5.56×45mm NATO		Purchased by the SAF in the 1990s.
	Emtan MZ-4	Israel	Carbine	5.56×45mm NATO	MZ-4P	More than 5,600 units acquired by PNP in 2018, some were handed over to the SAF.
	CAR-15 Commando	United States / Philippines	Carbine	5.56×45mm NATO	M733 M653 M653P	Either made by Colt USA or Elisco Tool (Elitool) Philippines.
	Norinco CQ	China	Semi-automatic rifle	5.56×45mm NATO	CQ-A5 B Model	5,000 units donated by China to the Armed Forces of the Philippines, passed on to PNP. Some were handed over to SAF.
	M14 rifle	United States	Battle rifle	7.62×51mm NATO	M14	In service with the SAF. Several units will be undergoing repair and upgrade with the Government Arsenal.

=== Designated marksman and sniper rifles ===
Picture	Model	Origin	Type	Caliber	Version	Notes
	Ferfrans SOACR	United States	Designated marksman rifle	7.62×51mm NATO	DMR SOACR 18"	Earlier models were called Ferfrans DMR.
	Ferfrans SOPMOD M14 Enhanced Battle Rifle	United States	Designated marksman rifle	7.62×51mm NATO	SOPMOD M14 EBR 18.5" SOPMOD M14 EBR 22"	Built by Ferfrans from existing M14 rifles using Sage International M14/M1A EBR Tactical Stock System aluminum chassis but with an M4 buttstock, delivered in 2008.
	UDMC F5-DGIS	Philippines	Designated marksman rifle	5.56×45mm NATO	F5-DGIS 20"	233 rifles delivered in April 2018. 1,760 rifles acquired in May 2019.
	IMI Galil	Israel	Designated marksman rifle / Sniper rifle	7.62×51mm NATO	Galatz	In limited numbers.
	SR-25	United States	Sniper rifle	7.62×51mm NATO	Mk.11 Mod 0	
	Heckler & Koch PSG1	Germany	Sniper rifle	7.62×51mm NATO	PSG-1	Limited numbers in service.
	Savage 10FP	United States	Sniper rifle	.308 Winchester	Ferfrans TSR Ferfrans TSR2	111 units acquired by the PNP, several went to PNP-SAF. Acquired as the Ferfrans TSR2, using the Savage 10FCP base unit with modifications and features added by FERFRANS.
	Barrett M82	United States	Anti-materiel rifle, sniper rifle	.50 BMG	M82A1	M82A1 in service since the early 1990s.

=== Machine guns ===
Picture	Model	Origin	Type	Caliber	Version	Notes
	IWI Negev	Israel	Light machine gun	5.56×45mm NATO 7.62x51mm NATO	Negev Negev NG-7	Standard squad automatic weapon. 320 units of Negev 5.56mm machine guns and 231 units of Negev NG-7 7.62mm machine guns were delivered in early 2018, many were allocated for SAF. 97 more Negev NG-7 7.62mm machine guns were delivered in early 2018, most were provided to the PNP-SAF.
	Ferfrans HVLAR	United States	Light machine gun	5.56×45mm NATO	HVLAR	Standard squad automatic weapon.
	FN Minimi	Belgium	Light machine gun	5.56×45mm NATO	Minimi Para	
	Ultimax 100	Singapore	Light machine gun	5.56×45mm NATO	Mark 3	
	K12	Republic of Korea	General-purpose machine gun	7.62×51mm NATO	K12	Acquired by Philippine National Police in 2018 for the Special Action Force.
	M60 machine gun	United States	General-purpose machine gun	7.62×51mm NATO	M60E3 M60E4	M60s known to be used.
	M240 machine gun	United States	General-purpose machine gun	7.62×51mm NATO	M240B	Standard general purpose machine gun.
	Vektor SS-77	South Africa	General-purpose machine gun	7.62×51mm NATO	SS-77	Acquired in limited numbers, mostly mounted on armed vehicles.
	M2 Browning	United States	Heavy machine gun	.50 BMG	M2HB	Tripod and vehicle/boat-mounted.

=== Grenade launchers and assault weapons ===
Picture	Model	Origin	Type	Caliber	Version	Notes
	M203 grenade launcher	United States	Grenade launcher	40mm grenade	M203 M203A1	Used by the SAF. Attached to M4/M4A1 (M203A1) and M16A1 (M203).
	CZ 805 G1	Czech Republic	Grenade launcher	40mm grenade	805 G1	69 units formally accepted on 9 August 2019.
	M79 grenade launcher	United States	Grenade launcher	40mm grenade	M79	Used by the SAF. Also used for non-lethal ammunition for crowd dispersal.
	SB-40 LAG	Spain	Automatic grenade launcher	40mm grenade	SB-40 LAG	Mounted on tripods, or vehicle mounted on light utility vehicles.
	M67 recoilless rifle	United States	Recoilless rifle	90mm	M67	In service.
	RPG-7	Russia / Serbia	Rocked propelled grenade launcher	40mm	RBR7	In service, 26 units acquired in 2020.

=== Mortars ===
Picture	Model	Origin	Type	Caliber	Version	Notes
	M6 mortar	Austria	Commando Mortar	60mm	M6 C-640 Mk.1	20 units ordered in 2018, received in 2020.
	M75 mortar	Philippines	Mortar	60mm	M75	Several units carried over from the Philippine Constabulary.
	M29 mortar	United States	Mortar	81mm	M29	Several units carried over from the Philippine Constabulary.

=== Armored vehicles ===
Picture	Model	Origin	Type	Version	Units	Notes
	Cadillac Gage Commando	United States	Armoured personnel carrier	V-150	28 Units	Used by the SAF. Although the number of active vehicles might be less. 2 captured by Maute Group fighters in May 2017.
	Shladot-MDT Armor Tiger Mk. II	Israel	Armoured personnel carrier	4x4 LWB	6 Units	Six acquired in 2019. Armed with cupola-mounted 12.7mm or 7.62mm machine gun.
	AM General HMMWV	United States	Armored tactical vehicle	M1114	unknown	25 M1114 provided in 2013 shared between the Philippine Army and PNP-SAF.
	Steelcraft MX-8 Armored Escort Vehicle	Philippines	Armored tactical vehicle	MX-8 Mk. 3	1 Unit	The sole Mk.3 prototype is in service with the Philippine National Police.
	CTK Armored Vehicle	Philippines	Armoured personnel carrier	6W Urban	3 Units as of April 2020	Several in PNP-SAF inventory. Based on locally developed bank armored vehicles. Only used on urban operations.

== Commanders ==
The list are the directors who had commanded the SAF.

NAME	RANK (Note: As of February 21, 2019, per the current (2019) rank system, the National Police has no rank holders of Second Lieutenant equivalent.)	TERM
Fidel V. Ramos (founder)	Major General	May 9, 1983 (inauguration); The concurrent PC chief/DG-INP
Reynaldo Velasco	Lieutenant Colonel	May 16, 1983 – February 13, 1987
Avelino I. Razon Jr.	Major	February 14, 1987 – August 1, 1989
Hermogenes E. Ebdane, Jr.	Police Brigadier General	August 2, 1989 – February 11, 1991
Enrique T. Bulan	Police Brigadier General	February 12, 1991 – March 8, 1992
Dictador L. Alqueza	Police Brigadier General	March 8, 1992 – June 5, 1992
Recaredo A. Sarmiento II	Police Brigadier General	June 6, 1992 – January 2, 1994
Edgar Aglipay	Police Brigadier General	January 2, 1994 – June 6, 1996
Marcelo E. Navarro Jr	Police Brigadier General	June 16, 1996 – August 23, 1998
Jose O. Dalumpines	Police Brigadier General	August 14, 1998 – February 14, 2001
Rogelio B. Bathan	Police Brigadier General	February 14, 2001 – September 13, 2002
Servando M. Hizon	Police Brigadier General	September 14, 2002 – December 27, 2003
Silverio D. Alarcio Jr.	Police Brigadier General	December 9, 2003 – September 7, 2004
Marcelino F. Franco Jr.	Police Brigadier General	September 9, 2004 – February 26, 2006
Silverio D. Alarcio Jr.	Police Brigadier General	February 24, 2006 – May 16, 2006
Felizardo M. Serapio Jr.	Police Brigadier General	May 16, 2006 – March 2007
Leocadio SC Santiago Jr.	Police Major General	March 2007 – 2010
Catalino S. Cuy	Police Major General	2011 – June 2012
Carmelo E. Valmoria	Police Major General	June 2012 – December 11, 2013
Getulio P. Napeñas	Police Major General	December 11, 2013 – January 27, 2015
Moro Virgilio Lazo	Police Brigadier General	January 27, 2015 – March 4, 2015
Noli Taliño	Police Major General	March 4, 2015 – January 14, 2019
Amando Clifton B. Empiso	Police Major General	January 14, 2019 – September 9, 2020
Bernabe M. Balba	Police Major General	September 9, 2020 – May 10, 2021
Felipe R. Natividad	Police Major General	May 10, 2021 – March 1, 2022
Patrick T. Villacorte	Police Major General	March 1, 2022 – August 1, 2022
Edgar Allan O. Okubo	Police Major General	August 1, 2022 – February 28, 2023
Rudolph B. Dimas	Police Major General	February 28, 2023 – November 20, 2023
Bernard M. Banac	Police Lieutenant General	November 20, 2023 – May 8, 2024
Mark D. Pespes	Police Major General	May 8, 2024 – March 9, 2026
Paul Kenneth T. Lucas	Police Brigadier General	March 9, 2026 - present
