= William Foulkes (footballer, born 1863) =

Welsh footballer

Personal information
- Full name: William Tannatt Foulkes
- Date of birth: 1863
- Place of birth: Llanrhaeadr, Wales
- Date of death: 8 February 1937 (aged 73)
- Place of death: Oswestry, Shropshire, England
- Position: Defender

International career
Years	Team	Apps	(Gls)
1884–1885	Wales	2	(0)

William Tannatt Foulkes (1863 – 8 February 1937) was a Welsh international footballer. He was part of the Wales national football team between 1884 and 1885, playing 2 matches. He played his first match on 9 February 1884 against Ireland and his last match on 23 March 1885 against Scotland.

== See also ==
- List of Wales international footballers (alphabetical)
