= Ash Street shootout =

Gunfight in Washington state, United States

- Date: September 23, 1989
- Location: Hilltop, Tacoma, Washington, U.S.
- Caused by: Tensions over drug crime
- Result: Increase in police presence in Hilltop; Shift toward community-oriented policing; More block-level organizing in Hilltop

Parties
Members of the 2nd Ranger Battalion (off-duty)	Alleged drug dealers (Note: While the police would later accuse those affiliated with the house of being members of the Crips, most subsequent reporting has not described them as such, but has referred to them as actual or alleged drug dealers or gang members: Goldberg 1990, 1:33: "people [Foulk's side] say[s] were using and dealing drugs".; Eng 1998: "suspected drug dealers"; "drug dealers".; Robinson 2009: "gangsters"; "assailants".; Janavel 2022: "alleged gang members".)	Tacoma Police Department

Lead figures
Bill Foulk	None proven in court	Ray Fjetland

Number
About 12 (Note: AP 1989b, AP 1989c, & Koch & Plank 1989: 12 Rangers total. UPI 1989: 10 to 15. Robinson 2009: 15.)	15 to 20	At least 12

Casualties and losses
All briefly detained; Some guns confiscated	2 arrested; Per police: 0 injured; Per Foulk: 1 or more injured	None

The Ash Street shootout was a gunfight on September 23, 1989, in the Hilltop neighborhood of Tacoma, Washington, United States, between off-duty United States Army Rangers and people associated with one Ranger's across-the-street neighbors, who were suspected of drug dealing and gang activity. An already tense neighborhood situation, wherein Staff Sergeant Bill Foulk (Note: William Foulk (/foʊk/ FOHK); born 1956 or 1957 (age 68–69).) and others had been advocating for more police action against drug crime, came to a head during a barbecue at Foulk's home on Ash Street, attended by other community members and a few other members of the 2nd Ranger Battalion. (Note: Koch & Plank 1989: 3 Rangers initially present. UPI 1989 & Robinson 2009: a few.) Both groups of belligerents claim that the other harassed them during the party. Foulk called for assistance from more Rangers, who arrived with privately owned firearms. Starting at 9:20 p.m., 12 or so Rangers and 15 to 20 people from across the street exchanged gunfire with handguns and long guns for five to thirty minutes (Note: Koch & Plank 1989: 5 to 25 minutes of shooting. Goldberg 1990, 1:20 & Robinson 2009: 10. Eng 1998: more than 10. AP 1989a & AP 1989b: 30.) until police arrived. It is unclear which group fired first; both sides blamed the other. (Note: Bernard Goldberg of 48 Hours, in a segment on the shootout the following February, found the evidence inconclusive as to who shot first. Lily Eng in The Seattle Times in 1998 likewise did not reach a conclusion. Sean Robinson in The News Tribune in 2009, on the other hand, cites several witnesses, including News Tribune photographer Russ Carmack, to conclude that the first shots fired were in the direction of Foulk's house, coming from the west.) The conflict ended without reported injury after 100 to 300 rounds (Note: UPI 1989: more than 100 rounds fired. AP 1989c: 200 to 300. Foulk (in Goldberg 1990, 0:34), Eng 1998, & Robinson 2009: 300. AP 1989a, AP 1989b, & Koch & Plank 1989: hundreds.) were fired. Foulk initially affirmed this account, but since 2009 has said that one or more people on the other side were shot but fled.

Two people suspected of shooting at the Rangers were arrested; one was convicted of second-degree assault. Some of the Rangers' guns were confiscated. The incident spurred the local community to organize more. The national attention that it drew influenced reform in the Tacoma Police Department—which previously had often not responded to crimes that officers did not personally witness—shifting them toward a model of community-oriented policing.

== Background ==
In 1987, Bill Foulk, a staff sergeant in the 2nd Ranger Battalion based at Fort Lewis, moved to Ash Street in Hilltop, Tacoma, Washington, buying the worst home on the block for $10,000 (equivalent to $25,973 in 2025) so that he could restore it. At the time of the shootout he had been in the Army for 12 years. Hilltop saw an uptick in gang violence and open drug use in 1989; when Foulk returned home from a deployment to Panama that summer, he and neighbors began to advocate for a greater police presence. The underfunded and understaffed Tacoma Police Department, however, moved officers away from Hilltop. Relations were tense between community members and the police, in an era before community-oriented policing, and 9-1-1 calls were often met with no response, with officers responding only to crimes they witnessed. Foulk, his wife, and some of his neighbors photographed alleged drug dealers. On September 21, 1989, an article in the local The News Tribune described the group as "on the verge of vigilante action" due to police inaction; the story had the effect of slowing drug dealing in the area, which Foulk says angered gang members.

The main drug house in the neighborhood was across the street from Foulk's. After the shooting, occupants of the house acknowledged drug activity outside of it but denied participating in drug deals. This denial was contradicted by one of the tenants in 2009.

Foulk installed a video camera in an upstairs window of his home, (Note: It is unclear when the camera was installed: A contemporaneous report by Anne Koch and Joanna Plank of The Seattle Times (as reprinted in The Philadelphia Inquirer) implies that it had been up for months, while Sean Robinson of The News Tribune in 2009 implies it was installed only a few days before the barbecue. It is also unclear how its existence became known: The Associated Press said at the time that its existence had been reported in a news article prior to the barbecue, but does not say what news article. Koch and Plank mention the camera and mention an increase in threats after a news article ran, but do not say if the news article mentioned the camera. Michael Gilbert's piece in The News Tribune two days before the shooting, referenced by Robinson in 2009, does not mention the camera.) pointed at the house in question. After The News Tribune's article ran, he organized a barbecue on September 23 as a show of unity and to discuss plans to reduce crime. He invited a few other Rangers and suggested that they come armed.

== Confrontation and gunfight ==
During the barbecue, people at the house across the street threw rocks and rotten pears at the upstairs video camera. Some made threatening gestures to those attending the party and one fired at Foulk's house with a BB gun. Foulk and some other Rangers crossed the street and confronted the other group. The latter refused to stop throwing things and shooting BBs, while Foulk refused to stop filming their activities. According to Foulk, they then threatened to kill him. Some residents of the neighborhood, including occupants of the house across the street, presented a different narrative, in which the Rangers had taunted them and laughed at them.

Returning to his home, Foulk called other Rangers for backup. The force of about twelve soldiers drew up defensive plans and Foulk erected a wooden barricade. Foulk also called a journalist and photographer from The News Tribune, who came to the home. Foulk carried a Browning Hi-Power and Colt .357. The other Rangers' weapons included an AR-15 rifle, an M14 rifle, a 12-gauge shotgun, and a number of handguns. All of the Rangers' weapons were personally owned, not military-issue. The gunfight began at 9:20 p.m., after sunset. It is unclear which side fired first; both claim it was the other. In the ensuing battle, people fired toward Foulk's house from behind parked cars and Rangers fired back as one partygoer (herself armed) called 9-1-1. Shooting continued for 5 to 30 minutes between the Rangers and 15 to 20 adversaries. Police arrived on the scene and then briefly retreated when gunfire continued; ultimately at least a dozen arrived.

Those who had been firing at the Rangers fled. Arriving police officers first detained everyone at the Foulk residence and sought to confiscate their guns as evidence. The officer tasked with disarming the Rangers, feeling that they had done nothing wrong, struck a deal in which they would hand over only their less valuable guns. All weapons taken were owned lawfully. The police then pursued those who had run away, partly based on descriptions given by the Rangers, and arrested two on outstanding warrants. The first police officers to respond estimated 50 to 60 shots fired in less than a minute. Estimates of the total number fired range from 100 to 300. No one was reported injured at the time of the shooting. Foulk said to 48 Hours in 1990 that he had told the Rangers to avoid hitting anyone, for fear of being sued. Russ Carmack, The News Tribune's photographer at the scene, later said that he had heard a police commander lecture the Rangers for failing to hit anyone. In 2009, Foulk said to The News Tribune that one Ranger had in fact winged someone who charged the house. In 2022, he said to Fox 13 Seattle that the Rangers shot multiple people, who fled the scene rather than await emergency medical services.

== Aftermath ==
The Tacoma Police criticized the Rangers throughout the process—at the scene, to the press, and to the Rangers' superiors—for failing to request police intervention before the shooting started. Foulk responded that he did not think it would have helped, as officers would only respond to a crime in progress. Tensions continued the next day. The partygoer who had called 9-1-1 and a tenant of the house across the street fought publicly. An Associated Press photograph of the two women grappling ran in papers across the United States. Hand-to-hand fighting among supporters of both sets of belligerents continued for 27 minutes until the police, who had been busy answering other calls, arrived. No one was seriously injured. The woman from across the street and her fellow tenants were subsequently evicted by their landlord.

The Rangers' commanders publicly supported their decision to engage, but criticized Foulk for calling other Rangers to the scene in the build-up to the shoot-out. Foulk says he was denied promotion as a result of the publicity caused by the shootout and that other Rangers were forbidden from visiting his home. Foulk saw further action in Panama during its invasion by the United States; he left the Army in 1993.

Of the two people arrested, one was charged. He maintained to 48 Hours while awaiting trial that the Rangers had fired first, unprovoked, a claim that correspondent Bernard Goldberg found implausible. He said that he and the others had not been engaged in any criminal conduct, although he acknowledged that he had been smoking marijuana after Goldberg showed photographic evidence. The man's lawyer defended him to Goldberg as having been simply "the slowest runner". The man was convicted of second-degree assault and sentenced to 22 months in prison.

The shootout and the national attention it brought were an embarrassment for the Tacoma Police and accelerated the plans of its chief, Ray Fjetland, to move toward a model of community-oriented policing. Positions were re-filled on Hilltop's crime management team and community liaisons were established. The News Tribune, in a retrospective piece published 20 years after the event, framed it as a catalyst for policing improvements and an eventual decrease in crime on Ash Street. The Tacoma Police established an office in Hilltop in 1990 to work on shutting down drug houses. Foulk's actions spurred the creation of more neighborhood block groups and more community reporting of crime, contributing to the condemnation of dozens of drug houses. As of 2022, Foulk lives in the same house—with all bullet holes patched, except one left as a reminder.
