= Ferfrans =

American firearms manufacturer

- Company type: Private
- Industry: Arms industry
- Founded: 1998; 28 years ago
- Headquarters: Montclair, California, United States
- Products: Firearms
- Website: www.ferfrans.net

Ferfrans (stylized as FERFRANS) is an American firearms manufacturer based in Montclair, California. It was established in 1998 by Filipino–American brothers Ferdinand and Francis Sy. Ferfrans was derived from the brother's names, Ferdinand and Francis. The company was previously known as Ferfrans Specialties.

The company is known for their products based on the AR-series, especially the SOAR (Special Operations Assault Rifle), and their patented rate-reduction system called the Independent Sear Disconnector (also known as Delayed Sear Activation System (DSAS)) or simply called "Ferfrans Rate-Reduction System", and muzzle brake to improve handling at full-auto fire.

It also has a service center facility in Cebu, Philippines, where the Sy brothers originally are from, that supports their products in the Philippines and Asia.

It provides weapons for the Philippine National Police and the Armed Forces of the Philippines, as well as several police units in the United States, and several countries including Malaysia, Indonesia, and Peru.

== Products ==
FERFRANS recently updated their product line, focusing more on the AR-type range.

Current:

- FERFRANS SOAR (Special Operations Assault Rifle)
- FERFRANS SOAR-P – a piston version of the SOAR
- FERFRANS SCW (Sub-Compact Weapon)
- FERFRANS HVLAR (High Volume Light Automatic Rifle)
- FERFRANS SOACR (Special Operations Adaptable Combat Rifle)
- FERFRANS RMGL 403 (Rail Mounted Grenade Launcher)

Former:

- FERFRANS TSR and TSR-2 – based on the Savage 10FCP sniper rifle
- FERFRANS SOPMOD M14/M1A EBR (Enhanced Battle Rifle)
- FERFRANS PDW (Personal Defense Weapon) – replaced by the FERFRANS SCW
- FERFRANS Mini Commando – replaced by the FERFRANS SCW

Ferfrans also makes a muzzle brake with a detachable Concussion Reduction Device (CRD) designed to direct muzzle blast away from the shooter to reduce felt concussion.
