= Tacoma Police Department =

Municipal police department in Washington state, U.S.

- Abbreviation: TPD

Agency overview
- Formed: 1885

Jurisdictional structure
- Operations jurisdiction: Tacoma, Washington, US
- General nature: Local civilian police

Operational structure
- Headquarters: Tacoma
- Police officers: 334
- Civilians: 38
- Agency executive: Patti Jackson, Chief of Police

Website
- www.cityoftacoma.org/government/city_departments/police

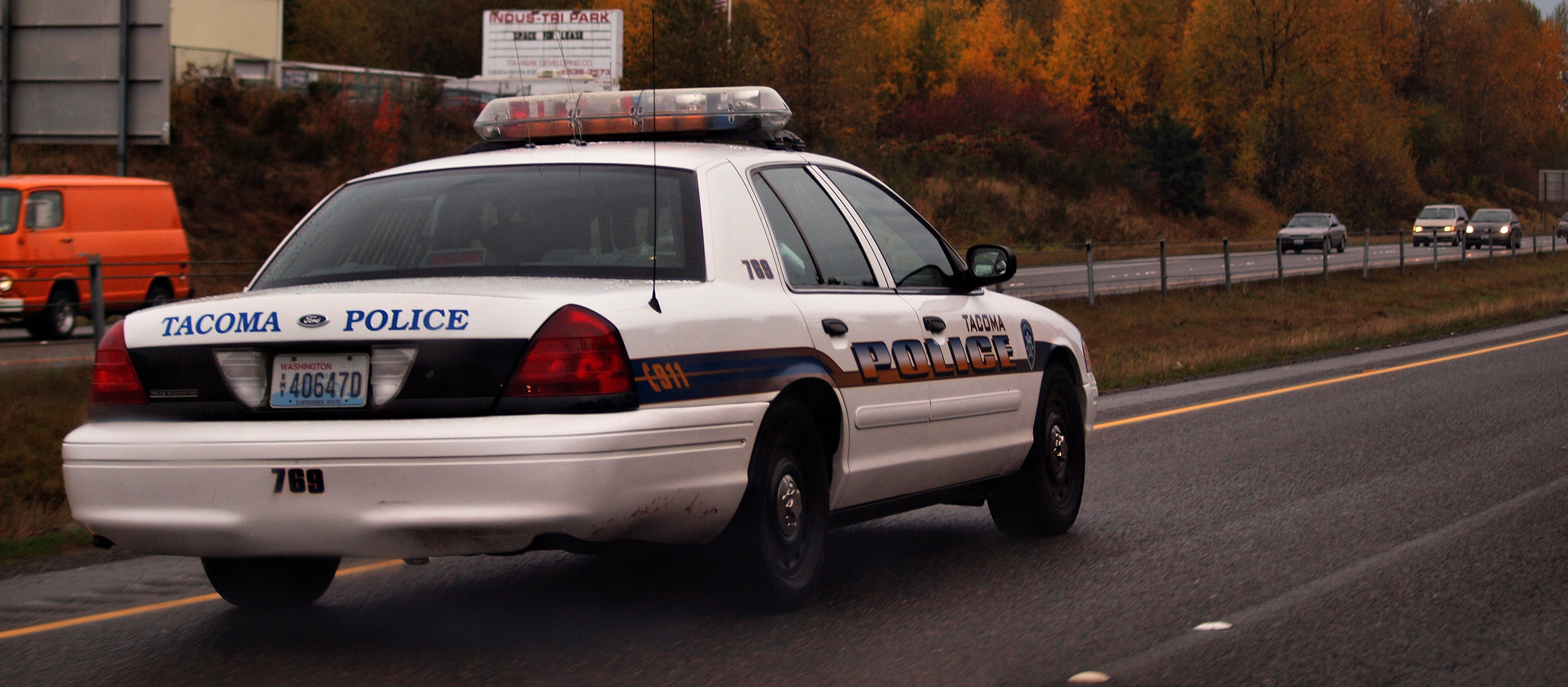
Tacoma Police Crown Victoria on Patrol

The Tacoma Police Department (TPD) is the primary law enforcement agency for the city of Tacoma, Washington, United States. The TPD employs 334 sworn officers and 38 civilian employees. The Chief of Police is Patti Jackson.

Tacoma Police is divided into four Report Sectors or Precincts numbered Sectors 1 through 4. The department has several Operations Bureaus such as Community Policing, K-9, Marine Services and Dive Unit, and Traffic Unit.

== History ==
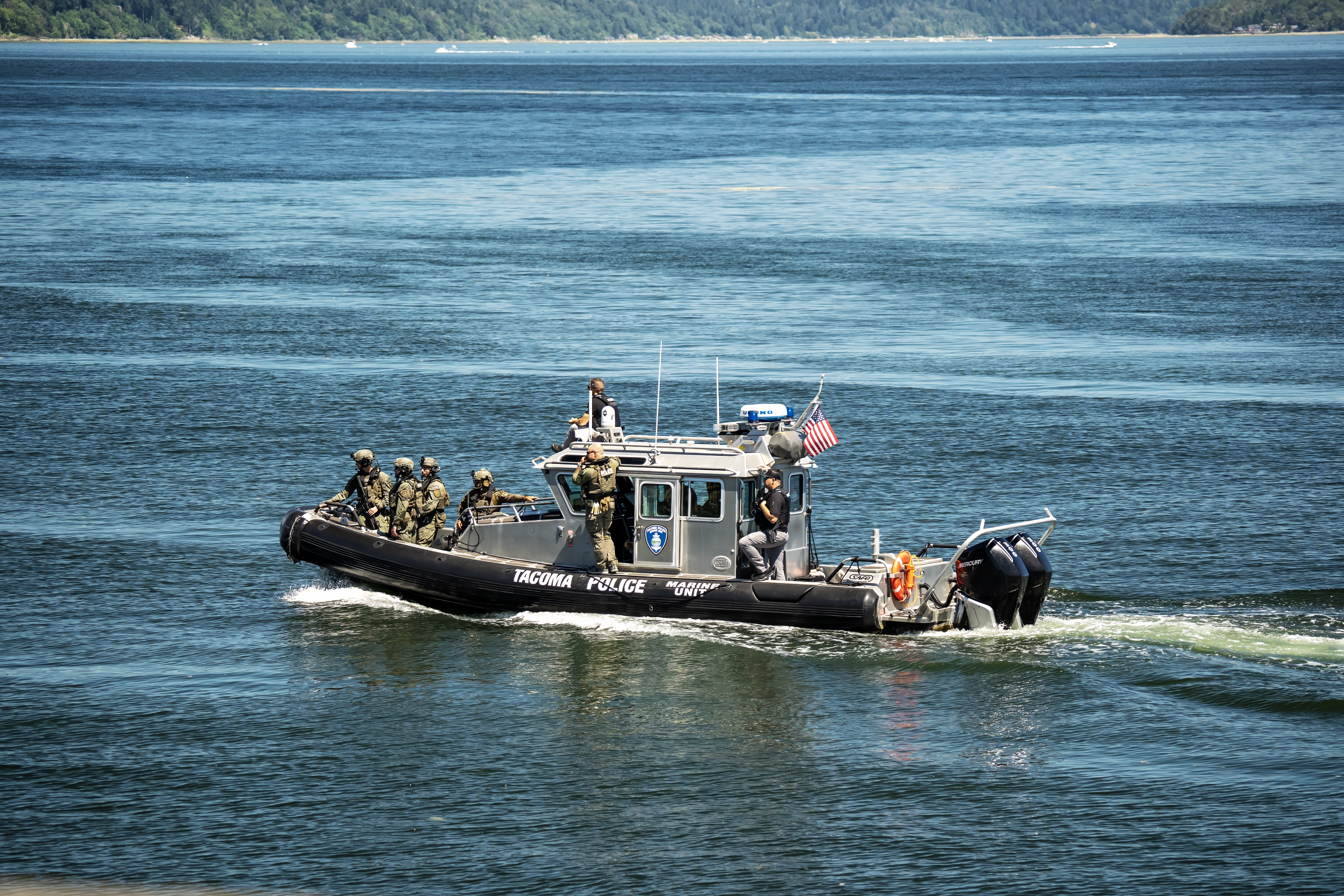
Tacoma PD SWAT with Maritime Unit

On May 6, 1869, the first Law Enforcement precinct was established in Tacoma by H.N. Steele when he was appointed Inspector. However, at that time the County Sheriff was the primary police force for Tacoma.

In the year 1874, Tacoma was incorporated and appointed its first town Marshal Howard Carr.

Recognizing the need for a specialized response team, the Tacoma Police Department formed its first tactical unit in 1984, initially named the "Special Operations Team." This team included a commander, assistant commander, eight entry operators, four marksmen, and four negotiators. A few years later, the unit was renamed the Special Weapons and Tactics (SWAT) Team.

== Controversies and misconduct ==
On March 3, 2020, Manuel Ellis, a black man, died while in TPD custody. Ellis said "I can't breathe" several times before his death. On December 2, 2023, Officers Matthew Collins and Christopher Burbank were found not guilty. The department offered them each a half million dollars to leave their jobs.

In 2021, several people were hit by an officer in a police car, causing multiple injuries. The officer was responding to reports of vehicles doing doughnuts in the street. It was found that the officer acted in defense for himself and there was no wrongdoing as he was being attacked.

In May 2025 Deputy Chief Paul Junger was fired for alleged "gender discrimination".
