= Waray-Waray gangs =

Criminal groups in the Philippines

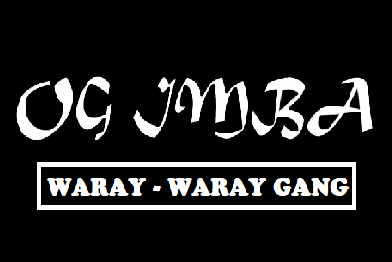
- Logo of one of the Waray-Waray Gangs in Tacloban City known as OG Imba.
- Years active: 1990s–present
- Territory: Philippines
- Ethnicity: Waray
- Activities: Armed robbery, Gang warfare, Narcotics, Contract killing, Kidnapping, Carnapping, Gun running
- Notable members: Jobert Española, Noel Enacmal, Arnel Suellen, Alfredo Mondares

Waray-Waray gangs (also known as Waray-Waray groups) are generic terms used in the Philippines to denote criminal groups who are of Waray ethnicity. They originated from provinces Leyte and Samar where the majority are of Waray background, later spreading into Luzon. Most of their criminal activities involved armed robberies, but various other gangs have also dabbled in kidnapping, carnapping, gun running, assassinations, gang warfare, and narcotics sale. Their bloody confrontations with the police made them the most notorious gang in the Philippines.

== History ==
Waray-speaking criminals have been documented in Luzon since the 1990s, though it wouldn't be until 1997 when they were first referred to as Waray-Waray gangs. In that year, a Waray-Waray gang kidnapped Chinese-Filipinos Virgilio and Christine Chua and their maid Analyn Simbajon. The case was dubbed by the Movement for Restoration of Peace and Order (MRPO) as the longest trial in the history of kidnap-for-ransom cases in the country. At the start of the new millennium, four members of a Waray gang from Northern Samar were cornered and captured by police in Quezon City. This group confessed to a number of robberies and kidnappings using homemade firearms. In 2001, a policeman by the name of Superintendent Eugenio Casalme was killed by a Waray-Waray gang during a hold-up of a bus that was on route to Pampanga. He was one of the passengers at that time, and when the gang members noticed his police uniform, they shot him in the chest and neck.

In April 13, 2002, in one of the bloodiest robberies in Philippine history, the Waray-Abuyog Gang shot and killed three policemen and a traffic enforcer in a police precinct in Meycauayan, Bulacan. They dressed themselves in military uniforms and drove to the area in a white van. Using assault rifles, they riddled the precinct and the unsuspecting law enforcers, before making their escape. Investigators later found out that this was a diversion aimed to remove or distract nearby policemen, as another group robbed a jewelry store. Many members of the group were killed or captured a month later. In July of that year, the house of actor and politician Sonny Parsons was invaded by a Waray-Waray gang. They tied him and members of his family and nearly raped his two daughters. The actor managed to trick the gang into thinking that patrolmen were roaming around the neighborhood. As the gang hastily retreated, Parsons removed his bindings, grabbed a pistol, and shot at the suspects, killing three. The same year also saw the murder of an unnamed businessman in Quezon City during a robbery by the Solid Bonnet Waray-Waray Gang. Three members, including leader Canisio Liad Abella, were captured in Angeles City nearly three years later.

Between 2003–2004, Waray-Waray kidnapping gangs began targeting prominent Chinese-Filipino businessmen in several kidnapping cases. The victims included businesswoman Dominga Chu, and Coca-Cola Export Corporation finance manager Betti Chua Sy. The latter died from her injuries while in custody of the gang. A 10-year-old named Martin Guevarra was also kidnapped by a Waray group led by Arnel Suellen. Six more abductions took place and each of the families paid P2 million in ransom. These led to the National Bureau of Investigation naming them "the most active kidnap gang in the country", and President Gloria Macapagal Arroyo herself ordering a new crackdown to prevent more kidnappings. Many of these gang members were from Jaro, Leyte. Mid-2004 also saw a gunfight between members of a Waray group known as the Sudoy-Sudoy/Waray-Waray Group, and the combined forces of the Central Police District (CPD) and a Special Weapons And Tactics (SWAT) team. They were responsible for a P9-million robbery of an armored van robbery on April 5 at the SM City Annex on North EDSA in Quezon City. Five gang members were killed.

By 2006, Noel Enacmal, leader of the Waray-Waray Kidnap For Ransom (KFR), was captured in Barangay Mali, San Mateo, Rizal. He and his group were responsible for the abduction of some 20 people and a string of armed robberies, such as the kidnapping of Betti Chua Sy and the P60,000 payroll robbery in Cubao, Quezon City. In that same year, the bloody "Waray-Ilongo Gang War" of Parian, Cebu, participated by a Waray-speaking gang calling themselves "LeySam", resulted in the deaths of two college students and an employee of the Bureau of Customs.

=== Bloodiest years ===
In 2007, a large shootout between Waray-Waray gangsters — led by Ryan Guevarra — and various law enforcement elements, occurred at the North Luzon Expressway. The gang was in the process of robbing a bus when one of the passengers managed to call for help via cellphone. Police units set up a blockade at the corner of EDSA and Congressional Avenue, and SWAT members shot out the tires of the vehicle. During the escape attempt, the gangsters shot and killed the bus driver and another passenger. Together with hostages, the gang commandeered a number of vehicles during the subsequent chase. Three gangsters were killed and the rest were eventually apprehended. In Laguna Hills Subdivision, Rizal, three Waray-Waray gang members were killed in a shootout followed by three more who were captured. This specific gang was notorious for highway robberies, extortion, "akyat-bahay" and the sale of illegal drugs. Another Waray gang lost six of their members in a confrontation with the police in Tondo, Manila, together with two civilians.

In December 2008, the Waray-Ozamiz Gang fought the police in a running gun battle in a subdivision in Parañaque that led to the deaths of multiple people. The police were tailing the criminals in a suburb when suddenly, the criminals opened fire with M16 rifles fitted with grenade launchers. At least twelve gang members, a Special Action Force personnel, and four civilians — including a young girl — were killed. In that same month, two unidentified members of a Waray robbery gang were killed early morning in an encounter with policemen in Caloocan. The unit who fought the gang was composed of the NCR-CIDG, ISAFP, and Caloocan police. Chief Senior Supt. Isagani Nerez believed that the group was also involved in the recent gunbattle in Parañaque, as well as a robbery of an armored van in the University of the Philippines. In 2009, the Waray-Ozamiz Gang again robbed a Malaysian national named William Yeo, who owned a moneychanger shop in Ermita, Manila. Three of them were later captured by the police, and among the weapons recovered were two undocumented .45 caliber pistols, a .9mm Intratec machine pistol, M-16 Baby Armalite, two 12-gauge shotguns, three fragmentation grenades, six rifle grenades and two M203 40 mm grenade launchers.

2011 saw another shootout in a middle-class subdivision in Parañaque, where three members of a Waray-Waray robbery gang and a policeman were killed. In November 2012, two more Waray-Waray gangsters were killed in a shootout with the PNP-CIDG in San Fernando, Pampanga. In 2013, two leaders of a Waray-Waray robbery group were captured by the NBI in the same city. They were responsible for a series of murders and robberies of banks and moneychanger shops. Another leader, Noli del Monti from Samar, escaped. On the same year, three members of the Waray-Ozamiz Gang were killed during a shootout with law enforcement at a police checkpoint in Quezon City. The police received an intelligence report prior to the encounter, which stated that the three were planning to rob a pawnshop after a failed abduction attempt.

=== Typhoon Yolanda ===
Since 2010, there had been a rise of various street gangs who had been inspired by, or had based their names from, previous Waray criminal groups. These included a vigilante gang in Tacloban known as OG Imba: Waray-Waray Gang, who became infamous for several gang wars and riots with law enforcers. By 2014, congressmen submitted House Bill No. 3691, which would have hopefully made it illegal to name gangs after ethnicity, place, or religion. The bill was conceptualized to stop racism caused by these gangs. However, this naming tradition persisted throughout the decade. The aftermath of Super Typhoon Yolanda saw widespread lootings allegedly involving a Waray-Waray gang. A member of the PNP's intelligence unit in Tacloban reported that this particular group had banded together with escaped inmates from a city jail and other typhoon victims, numbering over 250 members. The group allegedly raided houses in Abucay, resulting in gunfire. A total of 600 policemen were dispatched to secure Tacloban after the calamity. Usage of the term "Waray-Waray Gang" in reports continued into 2015, when Waray gang leader Jobert Española was murdered by unknown assailants in Binondo, Manila. He was once convicted of killing policeman SPO2 Nestor Dela Cruz.

=== Philippine drug war ===
During the height of the Philippine drug war, two Waray-Waray gang members in Caloocan and Valenzuela were captured in 2017. This particular group had robbed two Indian nationals, and a Colt M1911 was recovered from one of them. In 2018, Waray-Waray gangsters were reported by Chief Supt. Edward Caranza as working as hired guns, who targeted local chief executives and potential political candidates. Six of them were killed in a shootout with the police in Rodriguez, Rizal, during a buy-bust operation. They were also involved in carnapping and robbery cases. On the night of December 5, 2020, two members of a Waray-Waray group were killed in a police operation in Quezon City. The members were part of a gun-running and gun-for-hire group who also partook in drug-dealing and kidnapping. One of those killed, Jhonny Radaza, was a former convict. A month later, four more gangsters were killed in a rescue operation with the police after kidnapping a Chinese national.

On January 30, 2024, a gunfight between the police and a "crime gang in Samar" resulted in the deaths of three policemen and the wounding of four others. This gang from Sta. Rita, Samar was later dubbed the Ampoan Group, led by Edito Ampoan, who made income through contract killings such as the assassination of Tiburcio Ocong, a barangay chairman of Bislig, Samar. Most of the gang members, including Ampoan, were later apprehended in the following month. In January 13, 2026, a suspected member of the Waray-Ozamiz Gang, who had escaped from the New Bilibid Prison, was captured by policemen in Cagayan de Oro. The presence of the gangster prompted fears of a possible resurgence of the criminal organization in the region, but PMAJ Joann Navarro assured that the PNP's area of responsibility had been secured.

== Ties to the Philippine Army ==
Some of the members of the Waray-Waray gangs were former or active soldiers of the Philippine Army, including Eliseo Barres, Alfredo Mondares and Army Cpl. Pelagio Royera. The "Solid Bonnet" Waray-Waray Gang, in particular, had four members who were active soldiers. The amount of high-caliber weapons and explosives recovered from these gangs, led to the police investigating whether they and the army have ties to each other.

== Infamous gangs ==
Many Waray-Waray gangs are differentiated from each other by their unique names, modus operandi, or places of origin. Some of the most notorious are:

- LeySam - A criminal organization whose name is an abbreviation of the words Leyte and Samar. They had committed many violent crimes from robberies, kidnappings, murders, to participation in gang conflicts, such as the "Waray-Ilonggo Gang War".
- Martilyo/Waray-Waray Gang - A robbery gang who specializes in invading pawnshops and jewelry stores, and stealing their jewelry by using hammers and other heavy steel tools to break glass cases. They would then retreat with the loot.
- O.G. Imba: Waray-Waray Gang - A street gang of Waray youths who became embroiled in a number of gang wars. They are known to wage war on other street gangs and are also known for committing riots and hits.
- Solid Bonnet Waray-Waray Gang - A robbery and drug smuggling syndicate who operated in Metro Manila and several parts of Luzon. It's alleged leader, Canisio Liad Abella, was a native of Samar.
- Sudoy-Sudoy Gang - The term "sudoy" in Waray translates to "loiter". These gangsters roam around the streets at night and mugged anyone they come across.
- Waray-Abuyog Gang - A gang known for their armed robberies and narcotics selling. Many of their members are former soldiers, making them well-trained, well-armed, and highly dangerous. They have also been documented making alliances with other Waray gangs, most notably the Sudoy-Sudoy Gang.
- Waray Waray K.F.R. - The acronym KFR means "Kidnap For Ransom". These Waray gangsters specialize in kidnapping people, specifically targeting Chinese nationals or Chinese-Filipinos.
- Waray-Ozamiz Gang - Another violent group that conducts bank robberies and the selling of illegal drugs. This group is unique because it is basically an alliance between Waray and Ozamiz criminals, hence the name.

== Legacy ==
The heyday of the Waray-Waray gangs gave birth to the negative stereotypical belief in the Philippines that the Waray people are a violent ethnic group compared to others. In an opinion column for a newspaper written on July 25, 2011, Prof. Gerry B. De Cadiz of the Eastern Visayas State University condemned the actions of the Waray-Waray gangs and their effect on the image of the Waray people. He stated, "Much to our embarrassment, being brave or mag-isog has been perceived by the nation to be associated with brutality, callousness and getting involved in criminality. So that the periodic broadcast in national networks and publication in widely-circulated broadsheets of the notorious activities of the so-called Waray-Waray Gang moulded an image so repulsive and damaging to the dignity of both prominent and ordinary Waray."

== In media ==
- The popular ABS-CBN show S.O.C.O.: Scene of the Crime Operatives aired an episode in December 2016 entitled "SOCO: Waray Abuyog Gang Strikes Terror in Meycauayan, Bulacan" that depicted the bloody shootout and heist in Meycauayan.
- ABS-CBN featured the gang again in episode 27 of their true crime show Philippine's Most Shocking Stories, entitled "Waray-Waray Gang Kidnap-Slay: The Betti Chua Sy Case".
- The Parañaque shootout and the Waray-Ozamiz Gang were featured in an episode of Case Unclosed entitled "The December Shootout".
- Louis Bulaong published a novella about the gangs entitled Bandido: The Story of the Most Notorious Filipino Gang, based on actual criminal events conducted by them in the 2000s.
- The gangs were also featured by Matthew Jacob Ramos in his short story entitled "Orphans of Biringan".
- Several musicians and internet personalities from the Philippines took their names from the gangs, such as rapper Boss Jet who released a soundtrack entitled "Waray Gang Represents", and let's player Chano Vlogs who posted gaming videos under his "Waray Gang" banner.

== See also ==
- Illegal firearm trade in the Philippines
