= Philippine Legion of Honor =

Philippine order

- Insignia of the Philippine Legion of Honor
- Type: Neck Order; Sash; Medal
- Awarded for: Meritorious & Valuable Service
- Presented by: Philippines
- Eligibility: Military Officers, and Enlisted Personnel; Diplomats; Heads of States & Governments; Distinguished Citizens and Public Servants
- Status: Currently Awarded
- Established: 1947; 79 years ago
- First award: 1947
- Ribbons of Legionnaire degree

Precedence
- Next (higher): Civilian: Quezon Service Cross; Military: Medal of Valor
- Equivalent: Civilian: Order of Lakandula, Order of Sikatuna
- Next (lower): Civilian: Order of National Artists, Order of National Social Scientists, Order of National Scientists, Gawad sa Manlilikha ng Bayan, Order of Lakandula - Special Class of Champion for Life; Military: Outstanding Achievement Medal
- Related: Legion of Merit

The Philippine Legion of Honor (PLH) (Filipino: Lehiyong Pandangal ng Pilipinas; Spanish: Legión de Honor Filipina) is the primary order of military merit of the Philippines conferred to citizens and military personnel, Filipino and foreign.

== History ==
The PLH traces its origins sometime in 1946 to Gilbert Perez, the Secretary of the Philippine Heraldry Committee, who sought help from American General Douglas MacArthur to establish a new award to reward those who helped liberate the Philippines during the Second World War. In a letter addressed to Executive Secretary Emilio Abello, it was initially planned to be called as the Legion of Philippine Liberation, but was later renamed as the Philippine Legion of Honor. It was patterned after the American Legion of Merit, and the French Legion of Honor.

It was formally established by President Manuel Roxas (through Philippine Army Circular No. 60 dated July 3, 1947).

== Conferment ==
=== General Criteria ===
The PLH is conferred upon Filipino civilians and military personnel, as well as citizens and military personnel of foreign allied nations, for meritorious service in military/defense affairs, or for contributions to the preservation of the honor of the Republic.

For civilians, it is conferred for their prior military/defense service, or for life achievement in public service. For military personnel, it is awarded to those who have performed exceptionally in the conduct of their duties.

It is awarded by the President of the Philippines, or by the Secretary of National Defense in the name, and by authority of the President. It is the highest award that the President can confer to anyone without the need for approval by the Congress, opposite to the Quezon Service Cross (for civilians and government officials), and the Medal of Valor (for military personnel).

=== Ranks ===
Originally, like its American counterpart, the PLH had four classes, known as degrees, with Legionnaire being the basic degree, and Chief Commander being the highest.

With the reform of the Philippine system of orders and decorations in 2003, the PLH's classes were renamed ranks instead of degrees, and two new civilian ranks, namely Grand Commander, and Grand Officer, were added.

The following is the criteria for both the civilian, and military divisions of the PLH:

Rank (Degree, pre-2003)	Criteria for Conferment	
Rank (Degree, pre-2003)	Civilian (Conferred upon...)	Military (Awarded to...)
==== Chief Commander (CCLH) (Punong Komandante) ====	a civilian for life achievement in public service not otherwise qualifying for the Quezon Service Cross; a former or incumbent head of state and/or of government	the President (or their counterparts in friendly nations); highest ranking military officers; Chief of Staff or their counterpart; "for eminently meritorious and valuable service in a position of major responsibility; the performance of such duty must merit exceptional recognition. However, a superior performance of the moral duties of a position shall not alone justify the award."
==== Grand Commander (GCLH) (Marangal na Komandante) ====	a civilian for singular acts of service with a tangible impact on the Philippine military sphere; a crown prince; Vice President; Senate President; Speaker of the House; Chief Justice or the equivalent; foreign minister or other official of cabinet rank; an Ambassador, Undersecretary, Assistant Secretary; other person of a rank similar or equivalent to the foregoing for life achievement in the military field; added in 2003	not applicable
==== Grand Officer (GOLH) (Marangal na Pinuno) ====	a civilian for acts of exemplary merit benefiting the Republic of the Philippines; a chargé d'affaires; e.p., Minister; Minister Counselor; Consul General heading a consular post; Executive Director; other person of a rank similar or equivalent to the foregoing; added in 2003	not applicable
==== Commander (CLH) (Komandante) ====	a civilian for acts of conspicuous merit benefiting the Republic; Chargé d'affaires; a.i., Counselor; First Secretary; Consul General in the consular section of an Embassy; Consular officer with a personal rank higher than Second Secretary; Director; other person of a rank similar or equivalent to the foregoing	Chief of Staff of the AFP (including the Chief of the Philippine Constabulary); Vice Chief of Staff of the AFP; Commanding General, PA; Flag Officer-in-Command, PN; Commanding General, PAF; Commandant, PMC; unified Commanders (or their equivalent in friendly nations); Senate President; Chief Justice; Heads of Departments; "for eminently meritorious and valuable service in a position of major responsibility, but in a lesser degree of category not warranting the rank of Chief Commander (CCLH)"
==== Officer (OLH) (Pinuno) ====	a civilian for acts of commendable merit benefiting the Republic; a Second Secretary; Consul; Assistant Director; other person of a rank similar or equivalent to the foregoing	military personnel with at least the rank of Brigadier General (pay grade O-7) for exceptionally meritorious conduct in the performance of outstanding service, but in a lesser degree of category not warranting the award of the rank of Commander (CLH); military personnel (regardless of rank) not qualifying for the Distinguished Service Star; "for exceptionally meritorious conduct in the performance of outstanding service"
==== Legionnaire (LLH) (Lehiyonaryo) ====	a civilian for acts of merit benefiting the Republic; a Third Secretary; Vice Consul; Attaché; Principal Assistant; other person of a rank similar or equivalent to the foregoing	military personnel (regardless of rank); "for exceptionally meritorious conduct in the performance of outstanding service, but to a lesser extent not warranting the award of the rank of Officer (OLH), or for meritorious service of more value than the Military Merit Medal"

Recipients of the PLH may be re-awarded the same rank (degree, pre-2003); in such cases (and regardless if the conferment is of a civilian or military nature), a Bronze Anahaw Leaf is appurtenant to the already-existing PLH medal ribbon, following the practice done in the AFP regarding military decorations. Such is the case for former President Fidel V. Ramos (CLH, 1986, 1988, 1991); his PLH ribbon therefore contains three Bronze Anahaw Leaves, denoting the three succeeding awards in the same rank/degree, on top of his CLH conferment upon being appointed as the Chief of the Philippine Constabulary-Director General of the Integrated National Police during the Marcos Sr. administration.

In rare cases, a recipient can be awarded two different ranks of the PLH, such is the case for Filipino Senators Benigno "Ninoy" Aquino, Jr. (OLH, 1950; CLH, 1954; 1958), and Lorenzo M. Tañada (LLH, 1947; CCLH, 1986).

== Insignia ==
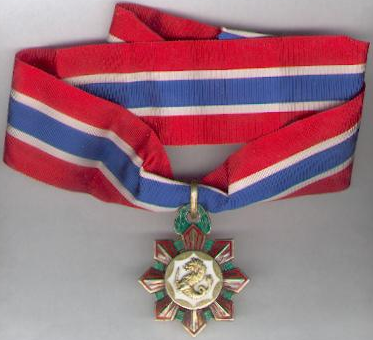
The Philippine Legion of Honor in the rank of Commander

The badge of the PLH was designed by Galo Ocampo, former Director of the National Museum, who also designed the Coat of Arms of the Philippines, as well as the nation's presidential seal. It has multiple interwoven symbols presenting the highest forms of representation of the Philippines as a nation.

=== Obverse ===
The badge of the PLH is shaped as a golden eight-rayed sun (similar to what is used in the Philippine flag) bordered in red enamel resting on a laurel garland. At the center of the sun is a golden disk with a concaved white octagon; resting on the octagon is a golden sealion (leodelfin) holding a sword.

=== Reverse ===
The back of all PLH insignias is plain, albeit with inscriptions. Opposite the ring that composes the laurel garland is the official name of the Philippines embossed in arc ("REPUBLIC OF THE PHILIPPINES"). Opposite the ring that composes the top part of the sun, the phrase "FOR MERITORIOUS SERVICE" is also embossed in arc. The center space is reserved for the engraved name of the recipient.

=== Symbolism and Significance ===
Sealion - the outstanding service/achievements rendered to the Philippines, and the President as well

Eight-rayed sun - the first eight provinces that revolted against Spain during the Revolution of 1896

Red outline of the sun - bravery and courage in the execution of the deed warranting the PLH

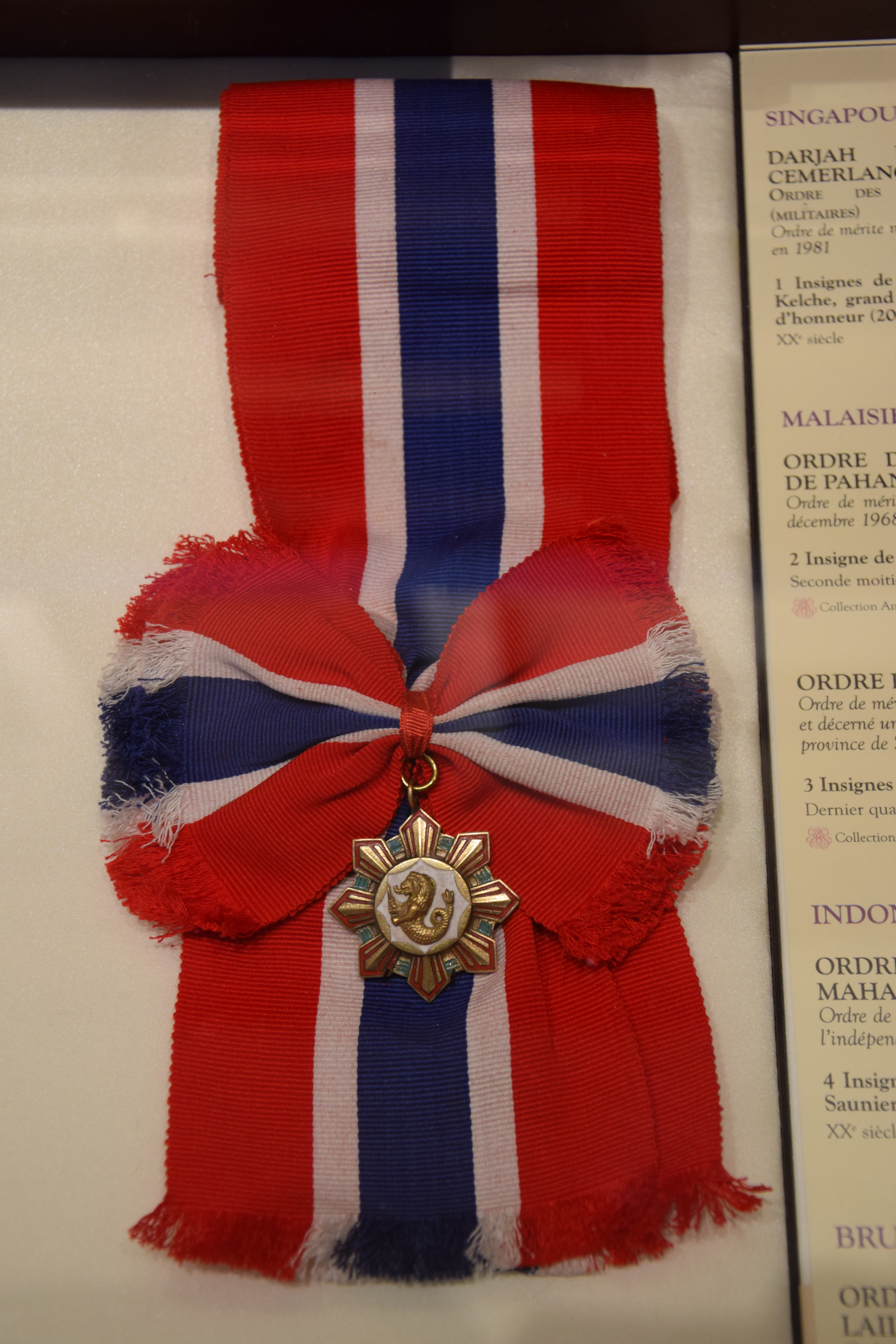
Sash of the Philippine Legion of Honor, rank of Chief Commander. A separate breast badge accompanies this.

=== Manner of Wear ===
The PLH, being in six ranks is appropriately worn in formal occasions, regardless of gender, as follows:

- Legionnaire (LLH): badge worn on the left breast suspended from a ribbon
- Officer (OLH): badge worn on the left breast, suspended from a ribbon with a Sampaguita wreath, and a golden sun appurtenance; the miniature version of the latter is also attached to its service ribbon
- Commander (CLH): badge around the neck suspended from a ribbon necklet; a golden sun appurtenance above a silver bar is attached to its service ribbon
- Chief Commander (CCLH): badge affixed to a sash worn over the right shoulder, accompanied with a breast badge pinned on the left breast; a golden sun appurtenance above a gold bar is attached to its service ribbon

As the ranks of Grand Officer (GOLH), and Grand Commander (GCLH) are relatively new due to the 2003 reforms on awards and decorations, they are presumably worn the same way as would a Commander (CLH), but with varied additional appurtenances respective of their rank.

All recipients, regardless of rank/degree, are also presented a miniature medal, differing only on the appurtenance attached to the service ribbon, previously described above.

== Notable recipients ==
NOTE: The names of recipients arranged in year of conferment, then in alphabetical order, to emphasize the longevity of the Order. Only recipients either with a proprietary Wikipedia article who has a verifiable source that they did receive the PLH, or those without but were conferred multiple awards of the PLH are featured.

=== Chief Commander (CCLH) ===
Recipient	Date of Conferment	Designation/Distinction
Franklin D. Roosevelt	July 4, 1947	former President of the United States (posthumous; first-ever recipient of the PLH)
Chiang Kai-shek	1949	former President of the Republic of China
Sukarno	February 3, 1951	former President of Indonesia
Francisco Franco	October 7, 1951	Head (Caudillo) of the Spanish State
Maxwell D. Taylor	1955	U.S. Chairman of the Joint Chiefs of Staff
Emilio Aguinaldo	July 3, 1957	revolutionary leader; inaugural President of the Philippines
Jose P. Laurel	March 9, 1959	former President of the Philippines
Douglas MacArthur	1961	American military officer; Commander, United States Army Forces Far East (USAFFE) during the Second World War
Dwight D. Eisenhower	April 9, 1961	American military officer; former President of the United States
Bhumibol Adulyadej	January 1968	King of Thailand
Ferdinand Marcos, Sr.	September 11, 1972	former President of the Philippines (self-conferred)
Imelda Marcos	September 11, 1972	First Lady of the Philippines (conferred by her husband)
John W. Foss	1981	Americal military officer; Chief, Joint United State Military Assistance Group (Philippines)
Lorenzo M. Tañada	August 10, 1986	Philippine Senator, statesman, World War II guerilla: also conferred the PLH, rank/degree of Legionnaire (1947)
Claudio Teehankee	April 21, 1988	former Chief Justice of the Supreme Court
Joaquin "Chino" Roces	October 5, 1988	businessman and newspaper publisher; founder of the Associated Broadcasting Company, and the Manila Times: also conferred the PLH, rank/degree of Officer (June 30, 1998)
Jaime L. Cardinal Sin	1992	former Archbishop of Manila
Daniel Inouye	1993	American military officer and Senator
Sergio Osmeña	October 20, 1994	former President of the Philippines (posthumous)
Haji Hassanal Bolkiah	March 5, 1998	Sultan of Brunei Darussalam
Akihito	December 3, 2002	former Emperor of Japan
Delfin Bangit	June 22, 2010	former Chief of Staff of the Armed Forces of the Philippines: also conferred the PLH, rank of Commander (June 11, 2010)
Stephen J. Solarz	December 10, 2010	American Senator
Teodoro C. Benigno	February 26, 2011	journalist; former Press Secretary of the Philippines; founder, Foreign Correspondents Association of the Philippines (FOCAP)
Fr. James B. Reuter, SJ	February 26, 2011	American Jesuit priest; honorary citizen of the Philippines
Ricardo David, Jr.	March 7, 2011	former Chief of Staff of the Armed Forces of the Philippines
Eduardo Oban, Jr.	December 12, 2011	former Chief of Staff of the Armed Forces of the Philippines
Jesse Robredo	August 28, 2012	former Secretary of the Interior and Local Government (posthumous)
Hillary Clinton	January 16, 2013	former United States Secretary of State
Emmanuel Bautista	2014	former Chief of Staff of the Armed Forces of the Philippines: also conferred the PLH, rank of Commander (2011), and Officer (July 20, 2011)
Gregorio Pio Catapang, Jr.	July 10, 2015	former Chief of Staff of the Armed Forces of the Philippines
Eduardo Año	2017	former Chief of Staff of the Armed Forces of the Philippines: also conferred the PLH, rank of Officer (2016)
Ronald dela Rosa	April 19, 2018	Philippine Senator; former Chief, Philippine National Police; fugitive
Romeo Brawner Jr.	July 21, 2026	former Chief of Staff of the Armed Forces of the Philippines

=== Grand Commander (GCLH) ===
Recipient	Date of Conferment	Designation/Distinction
Emilio Yap	October 6, 2006	businessman; former Chairman of the Board, Manila Bulletin: second award (first Bronze Anahaw Leaf) (2008)
Gilbert Teodoro	November 16, 2009	Secretary of National Defense, Arroyo, and Marcos Jr. administrations
Jaime Zobel de Ayala	December 24, 2009	businessman, of the Ayala fame
Jaime Augusto Zobel de Ayala	June 29, 2010	businessman, of the Ayala fame
Fernando Zobel de Ayala	June 29, 2010	businessman, of the Ayala fame
Napoleon G. Rama	February 26, 2011	Constitutional Commissioner

=== Grand Officer (GOLH) ===
Recipient	Date of Conferment	Designation/Distinction
Teodoro Locsin, Jr.	February 7, 2002	former Secretary of Foreign Affairs, Arroyo administration
Roman Kintanar	2007	former Director, PAGASA (the youngest in its history); former President, World Meteorological Organization

=== Commander (CLH) ===
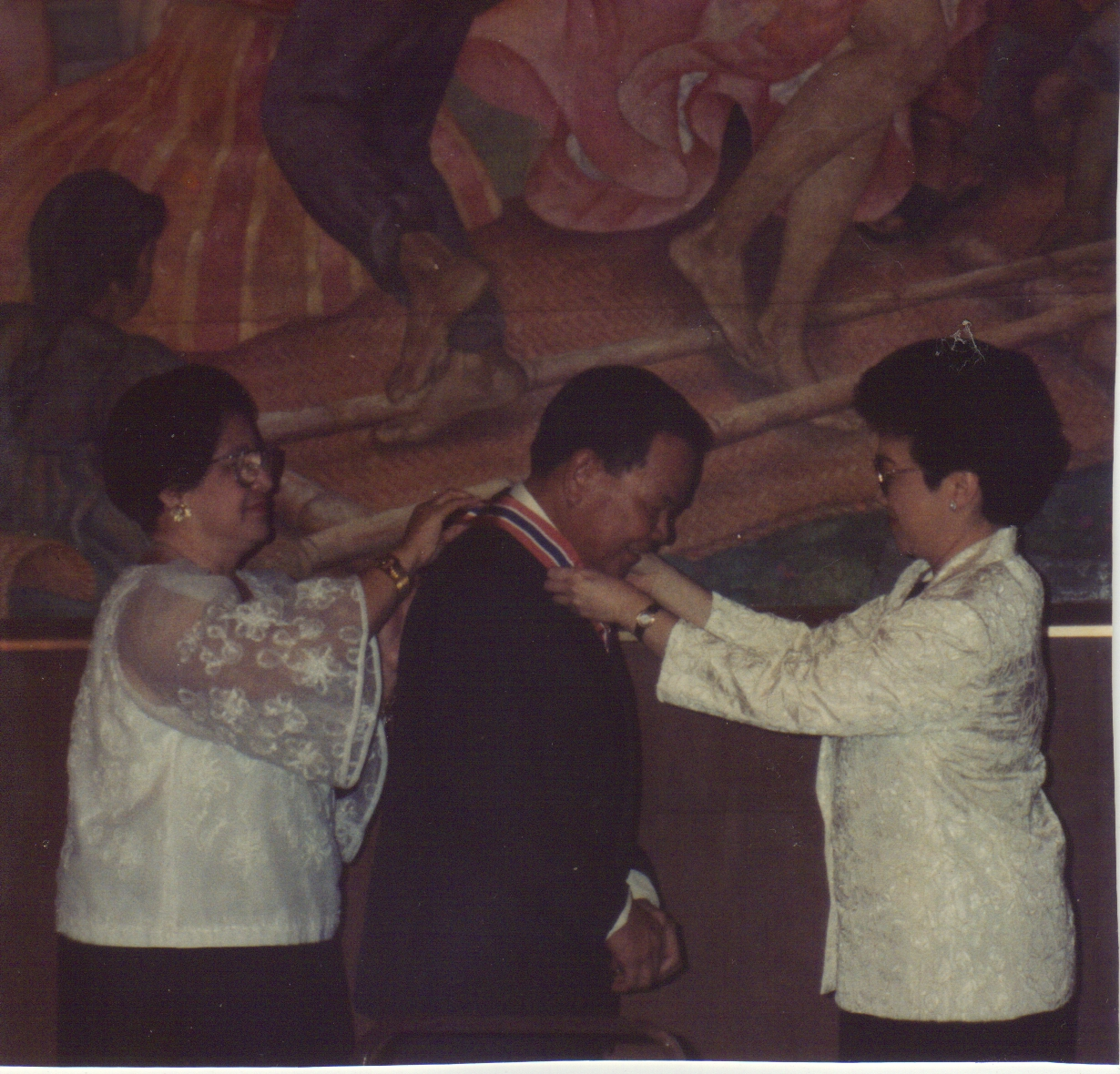
Former Executive Secretary Catalino T. Macaraig, Jr. (center) is conferred the PLH, Rank (then Degree) of Commander, by former President Corazon Aquino (right), 1990. Macaraig's wife, Araceli (left), assists the former President.

Recipient	Date of Conferment	Designation/Distinction
Paul V. McNutt	May 27, 1952	American politician; inaugural Ambassador of the United States to the Philippines
Alfredo Montelibano, Sr.	1952	former Secretary of the Interior and Local Government, and National Defense, Osmena administration
Benigno Aquino, Jr.	1954	Philippine Senator: second award (first Bronze Anahaw Leaf) (1958)
John E. Hull	1955	American military officer; Commander, United Nations Command (1953-1955)
Sotero Cabahug	1959	Cabinet Secretary, Osmena, and Magsaysay administrations
Narciso Ramos	February 11, 1959	former Secretary of Foreign Affairs, Marcos Sr. administration; father of former President Fidel V. Ramos (himself, a multiple-time PLH recipient)
Bernard W. Kearney	September 21, 1959	American military officer and politician
Jorge B. Vargas	1960	Cabinet Secretary, Quezon administration
Abdul Haris Nasution	1963	Indonesian military officer
R.E. Martadinata	August 30, 1963	Indonesian military officer
Walter Schirra, Jr.	March 6, 1966	American astronaut; commander, Apollo 7
Frank Borman	March 6, 1966	American astronaut; commander, Gemini 7, and Apollo 8
Draper Kauffman	1968	American military officer
Joseph J. Cappucci	1968	American military officer
Alfredo M. Santos	ca. 1973	former Chief of Staff of the Armed Forces of the Philippines; the first four-star general in the entire AFP
Juan Ponce Enrile	1974	Philippine Senator; former Minister of National Defense, Marcos Sr. administration: second award (first Bronze Anahaw Leaf) (November 27, 1986)
Roh Jae-Hyun	February 26, 1976	South Korean military officer; former Minister of National Defense
Fidel V. Ramos	ca. 1986	former President of the Philippines; former Secretary of National Defense, Corazon Aquino administration: second award (first Bronze Anahaw Leaf) (1986); third award (second Bronze Anahaw Leaf) (1988); fourth award (third Bronze Anahaw Leaf) (1991)
Jaime Ferrer	August 7, 1987	former Secretary of the Interior and Local Government, Corazon Aquino administration (posthumous)
Eduardo Ermita	March 31, 1988	former Vice Chief of Staff of the Armed Forces of the Philippines; former Executive Secretary, Arroyo administration
L. B. Moerdani	1988	Indonesian military officer
Catalino Macaraig, Jr.	December 26, 1990	former Executive Secretary, Corazon Aquino administration
Washington SyCip	June 20, 1991	businessman, of the SyCip Gorres Velayo fame
June Keithley	ca. 1991-1992	broadcast journalist
Mita Pardo de Tavera	ca. 1991-1992	former Secretary of Social Welfare and Development, Corazon Aquino administration; former Chairperson, PCSO, Ramos administration
Jose Laurel, Jr.	July 19, 1991	former Speaker, House of Representatives; son of former President Jose P. Laurel (also a PLH recipient)
Jesus Estanislao	July 19, 1991	former Secretary of Finance, Corazon Aquino administration
Jose de Jesus	June 1992	former Secretary of Public Works, Corazon Aquino, and Ramos admistrations; former Secretary of Transportation, Aquino III administration
Renato de Villa	ca. 1991-1992	former Chief of Staff of the Armed Forces of the Philippines
Franklin Drilon	1992	Philippine Senator; former Secretary of Justice, Corazon Aquino, and Ramos administrations
Carlos P. Romulo	October 20, 1994	statesman and diplomat; former President, United Nations General Assembly; former Secretary of Foreign Affairs, Quirino, and Marcos Sr. administrations (posthumous)
Rafael Ileto	October 20, 1994	former Secretary of National Defense, Corazon Aquino administration
Ruperto Kangleon	October 20, 1994	former Secretary of National Defense, Roxas administration; World War II guerilla commander, Leyte (posthumous)
Recaredo Sarmiento	1998	former Chief, Philippine National Police
Bob Filner	April 9, 1998	American Congressman; worked for Filipino war veterans rights
Juanita Amatong	June 5, 1998	former member, Monetary Board, Bangko Sentral ng Pilipinas: also awarded the PLH, rank/degree of Officer (May 13, 1998)
Joseph Prueher	January 12, 1999	American military officer
Angelo Reyes	March 17, 2001	former Chief of Staff of the Armed Forces of the Philippines, Estrada administration; former Cabinet Secretary, Arroyo administration
Benjamin Cayetano	October 24, 2002	first American Governor of Filipino American origin (Governor of Hawaii, 1994-2002)
Hermogenes Ebdane	August 24, 2004	former Chief, Philippine National Police; former Cabinet Secretary, Arroyo administration
Thomas B. Fargo	February 9, 2005	American military officer
Dato Zulkifeli bin Mohd Zin	December 7, 2005	Malaysian military officer
Halbi Mohammad Yussof	May 24, 2006	Bruneian military officer
Arturo Lomibao	July 5, 2006	former Chief, Philippine National Police
Generoso Senga	July 21, 2006	former Chief of Staff of the Armed Forces of the Philippines
Hermogenes Esperon	May 9, 2008	former Chief of Staff of the Armed Forces of the Philippines; former National Security Adviser, Duterte administration
Cardozo Luna	December 22, 2008	former Chief of Staff of the Armed Forces of the Philippines
Manny Pacquiao	December 22, 2008	boxer (the only eight-division world champion in history); Philippine Senator: also conferred the PLH, rank of Legionnaire (2008)
Victor Ibrado	May 3, 2009	former Chief of Staff of the Armed Forces of the Philippines: second award (first Bronze Anahaw Leaf) (March 10, 2010)
Benjamin Mixon	January 26, 2010	American military officer
Jesus Verzosa	June 15, 2010	former Chief, Philippine National Police: second award (first Bronze Anahaw Leaf) (September 14, 2010)
Reynaldo Mapagu	June 17, 2011	former Vice Chief of Staff of the Armed Forces of the Philippines; former Commanding General, Philippine Army: also awarded the PLH, rank of Officer (March 23, 2009)
Raul Bacalzo	September 9, 2011	former Chief, Philippine National Police
Arturo Ortiz	November 9, 2011	former Commanding General, Philippine Army; Medal of Valor recipient
Nicanor Bartolome	December 18, 2012	former Chief, Philippine National Police
Jessie Dellosa	January 17, 2013	former Chief of Staff of the Armed Forces of the Philippines
Moeldoko	November 3, 2014	Indonesian military officer
Hernando Iriberri	July 15, 2015	former Chief of Staff of the Armed Forces of the Philippines
Leonardo Espina	July 16, 2015	former Chief, Philippine National Police (acting)
Harry B. Harris, Jr.	April 27, 2018	American military officer

=== Officer (OLH) ===
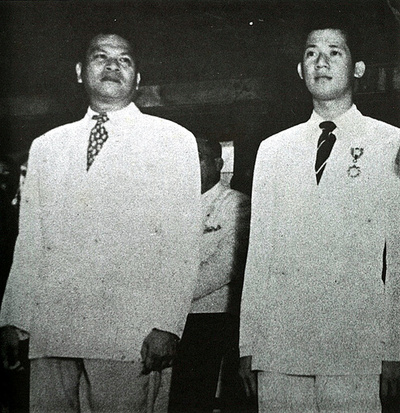
An 18-year-old Benigno "Ninoy" Aquino, Jr. (right) is conferred the PLH, Rank (then Degree) of Officer, by former President Ramon Magsaysay (left), 1951, for services in reporting the state of the Philippine Expeditionary Forces to Korea (PEFTOK) during the Korean War.

Recipient	Date of Conferment	Designation/Distinction
Manuel P. Manahan	1950	Philippine Senator; former Custom Commissioner, Magsaysay administration
Florentino Das	May 11, 1956	civilian sailor; awarded by President Magsaysay for sailing from Hawaii to the Philippines using a home-built sailboat
Raul S. Manglapus	June 23, 1998	Philippine Senator; Secretary of Foreign Affairs, Macapagal, Marcos Sr., and Corazon Aquino administrations; composer of the campaign jingle "Mambo Magsaysay"
William Padolina	June 23, 1998	Secretary of Science and Technology, Ramos and Estrada administrations; contributory to connecting the Philippines to the World Wide Web: second award (first Bronze Anahaw Leaf) (February 1, 1999)
Paeng Nepomuceno	1999	ten-pin bowling player; first athlete to be conferred of the PLH
Efren "Bata" Reyes	August 31, 1999	billiards player
Nelson Allaga	July 16, 2009	former Commander, AFP Western Mindanao Command: second award (first Bronze Anahaw Leaf) (June 3, 2010)
Gaudencio Pangilinan	June 17, 2011	former Chief, Bureau of Corrections; former Commander, AFP Northern Luzon Command: second award (first Bronze Anahaw Leaf) (July 20, 2011)

=== Legionnaire (LLH) ===
Recipient	Date of Conferment	Designation/Distinction
Teodoro M. Locsin	1947	World War II guerilla; co-founder of Free Philippines newspaper
J.B.L. Reyes	1947	World War II guerilla; former Associate Justice of the Supreme Court
Rafael R. Roces, Jr.	1947	World War II guerilla; journalist (posthumous)
Francis Turner	1951	American engineer; spearheaded the rehabilitation of Philippine roads damaged during World War II
Edith Nourse Rogers	June 10, 1953	American Congresswoman; fought for Filipino war veterans rights
Geronima Pecson	April 9, 1958	first woman Filipino Senator; member Executive Board of the United Nations Educational, Scientific, and Cultural Organization
Richard Sakakida	April 15, 1994	American military officer; used his Japanese descendancy to spy on the enemy during World War II
Fighter Squadron 201, Mexican Expeditionary Air Force	November 22, 2004	military unit that assisted in the Liberation of the Philippines (unit citation)
