= Getulio Napeñas =

Philippine politician and retired police officer (born 1959)

Retired PDIR Getulio Napeñas

Commander of the PNP Special Action Force
- In office December 11, 2013 – January 27, 2015
- PNP Chief: PDir.Gen. Alan Purisima
- Preceded by: PDir. Carmelo E. Valmoria
- Succeeded by: PCSupt. Moro Virgilio Lazo

Regional Director of the Police Regional Office–13 (CARAGA)
- In office January 2012 – December 2013

Provincial Director of the South Cotabato Provincial Police Office
- In office 2005–2006

Personal details
- Born: Getulio Pascua Napeñas, Jr. July 18, 1959 (age 67) Philippines
- Party: UNA (2016)
- Education: Philippine Military Academy
- Police career
- Service: Philippine National Police
- Allegiance: Philippines
- Divisions: Special Action Force; Police Regional Office–13 (CARAGA); Records Management Division; South Cotabato Police Office; Philippine Police Contingent to Kosovo; Philippine Police Contingent to East Timor; Directorate for Logistics, NHQ PNP; Regional Mobile Force (RMF) ARMM; Police Contingent to the UN Mission in Cambodia; Philippine Constabulary Training Division; PC/INP Regional Command 12 (RECOM 12); 54th Philippine Constabulary, PC/INP Regional Command 12
- Service years: 1978–2015
- Rank: Police Director

Getulio Pascua Napeñas, Jr. (born July 18, 1959) is a Filipino politician and retired police officer who served as commander of the Philippine National Police Special Action Force (SAF) from 2013 until 2015. He is blamed for the ill-fated Mamasapano clash but earned praise as a man of principle and a true leader of the people.

== Education ==
Napeñas graduated in the Philippine Military Academy in 1982. He was one of the officers who was part of the initial batch of officers of the PC SAF, which became the PNP SAF, when it was created May 16, 1983. He was the commander of the Philippine Police Contingent to Kosovo and he was also one of top of his class and training in special action force. Napeñas then served as chief directorial staff and deputy director of SAF before he was designated as director of the Police Regional Office in the Caraga region in January 2012. He also took master's degree in business administration (1995) in the Pamantasan ng Lungsod ng Maynila and master's degree in public administration (1998) in AMA Computer College (now AMA Computer University).

== Police career ==
Napeñas became commander of SAF in December 2013 after replacing Carmelo Valmoria, who was appointed chief of the National Capital Region Police Office. In January 2015, the Mamasapano clash resulted to the death of 44 SAF commandos in gun battles with guerrillas from the Bangsamoro Islamic Freedom Fighters (BIFF) and the Moro Islamic Liberation Front (MILF). The SAF operation was intended to arrest terrorists Zulkifli bin Hir (also known as Marwan), a Malaysian bomb maker, and Filipino terrorist Abdul Basit Usman. Marwan was killed during the operation and Usman escaped but was later killed by Moro rebels. As commander, he took full responsibility for the incident while others consider him as a scapegoat. Former President Ramos considered him a "patriot" and "brave" enough to accept the blame.

As a result of the Mamasapano clash, Napeñas was relieved from his position and later retires. He ran for Senator under the United Nationalist Alliance in the 2016 Elections but did not receive one of the 12 seats. Napeñas said his main platform focuses on peace and order and the welfare of police and armed forces, as well as other men in uniform. He also told reporters that he decided to run for senator to get justice for the slain police commandos. His candidacy was supported by various groups and was endorsed by Manila Mayor Joseph Estrada.

In January 2020, the Sandiganbayan acquitted Napeñas over Mamasapano clash:“There is insufficient evidence on record to proceed with the trial against accused Napeñas for usurpation of official functions."

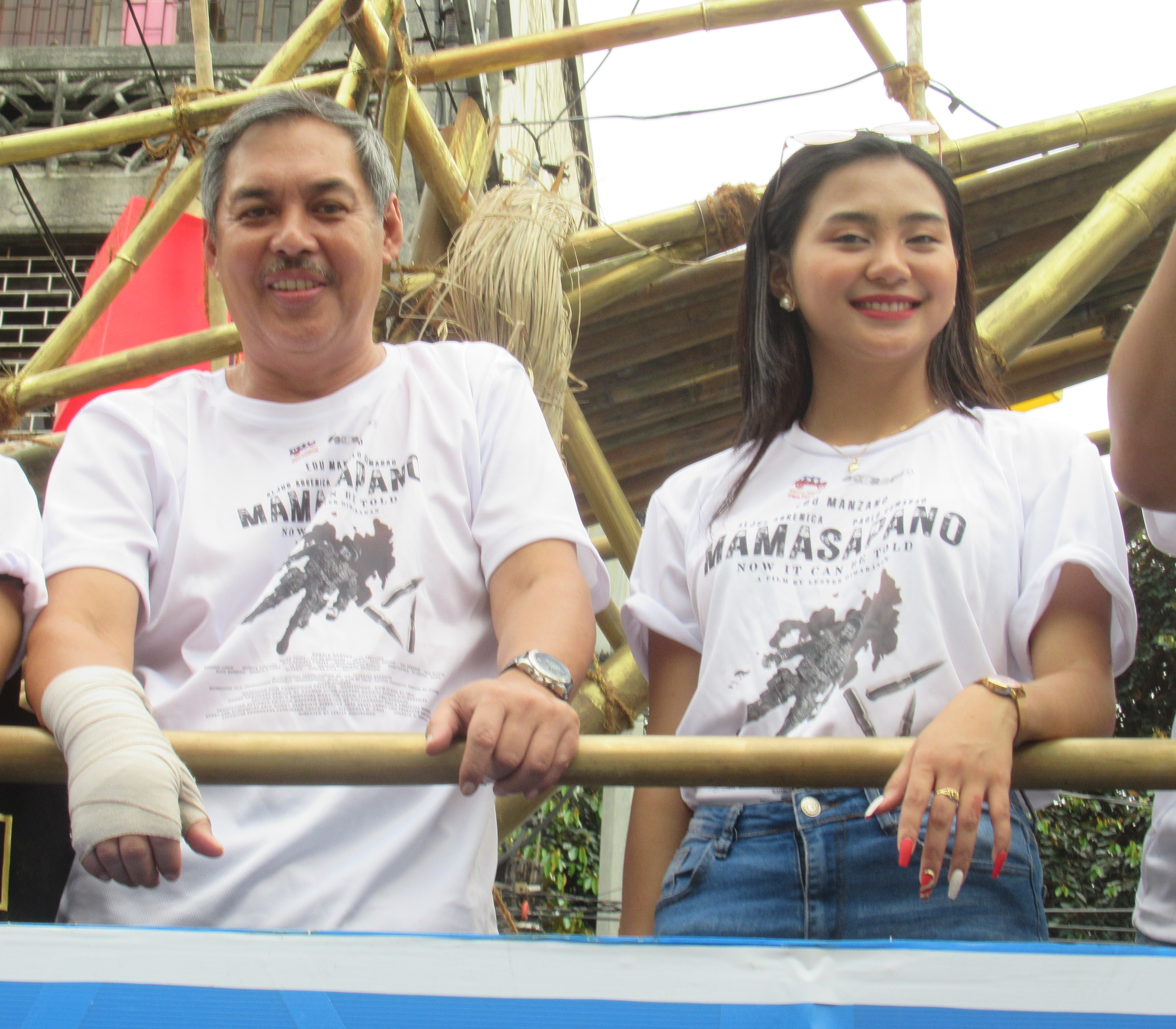
Allan Paule (Getulio Napeñas) on Mamasapano: Now It Can Be Told float

== In popular media ==
Napeñas was portrayed in Mamasapano: Now It Can Be Told by Allan Paule.
