= Mamasapano: Now It Can Be Told =

- Theatrical release poster
- Directed by: Lester Dimaranan (Note: Law Fajardo, previously worked on the film but left the project and was replaced by Dimaranan)
- Written by: Eric Ramos
- Produced by: Juvz Tesalona (Note: No producer credit is given; Alexander M. Cruz and Ferdinand Topacio are executive producers)
- Starring: Edu Manzano; Aljur Abrenica; Paolo Gumabao
- Cinematography: Paolo Emmanuel Magsino
- Edited by: Paolo Emmanuel Magsino
- Music by: Riki Gonzales
- Production company: Borracho Film Productions
- Distributed by: Viva Films
- Release date: December 25, 2022
- Country: Philippines
- Language: Filipino
- Box office: ₱5 million

Mamasapano: Now It Can Be Told (titled onscreen as simply Mamasapano) is a 2022 Philippine historical action film directed by Lester Dimaranan from a script by Eric Ramos. Starring Edu Manzano, Aljur Abrenica, and Paolo Gumabao, it depicts the events surrounding the 2015 Mamasapano clash that resulted in the deaths of 44 Special Action Force (SAF) troopers.

== Cast ==
- Edu Manzano as Police Maj. Gen. Benjamin Magalong
  - The Director of the Criminal Investigation and Detection Group
- Allan Paule as Maj. Gen. Getulio Napenas
- Aljur Abrenica as SPO1 Allan Franco
- Paolo Gumabao as Supt. Raymund Train
- Rey "PJ" Abellana as PSI Ryan Pabalinas
- Rez Cortez as Dir. Gen. Alan Purisima
- Juan Rodrigo as Secretary Mar Roxas
- Gerald Santos as SPO1 Christopher Robert Lalan
- Jojo Alejar as Police Director Catalino Rodriguez
- Jim Pebanco as SAF Director Chief Supt. Noli Taliño
- Tom Olivar as Supt Michael John Mangahis
- Claudine Barretto as Erica Pabalinas
- Jervic Cajarop as President Noynoy Aquino
- Ronnie Liang as PSI Gednat Tabdi
- Jojo Abellana as PO3 Virgel Villanueva
- Atty. Ferdie Topacio as Chief Supt. John Sosito
- Kuya Manzano as Foreign Official
- Bryan Altes as Supt Abraham Albayari
- Marcus Madrigal as PSI Rix Villareal
- Rico Barrera as PO3 Jose Manaar
- Doc Che Lejano as Police Senior Supt. Ronald dela Rosa

Also making appearances in the film are Jojo Abellana, Tom Olivar, Rico Barrera, LA Santos, Marcus Madrigal, AJ Oteyza, Marco Gomez, Rash Flores, Elmo Elarmo, and Nathan Cajucom. Ritz Azul and Myrtle Sarrosa make guest appearances in the film, portraying composite characters.

== Production ==
Mamasapano: Now It Can Be Told was made by Borracho Film Production under producer-lawyer Ferdinand Topacio. The film is based on the Mamasapano clash in 2015 which led to the death of 44 members of the Philippine National Police's (PNP) Special Action Force. The film was submitted as a script for the 2020 Metro Manila Film Festival but was not accepted. The film was directed by Lester Dimaranan and written by Eric Ramos. Ramos remarked that the script he did for Mamasapano was the most difficult script he had written since he "can't invent" and had to do a lot of research. The only fictional characters are those of Ritz Azul and Myrtle Sarrosa, who portray reporters from two rival networks. Mamasapano is described as action, a war film, and a procedural.

The film is based on the board of inquiry report of the PNP and the investigation report on the incident by the Senate.

The film was already in production in 2020 with Law Fajardo as director. It was supposed to be finished by May 2020, but production was not finished on schedule. It was planned that the scene of the Mamasapano clash be shot during the dry season, but rainy season came before it was filmed. This led to the replacement of most of the production staff, with writer Ramos being a noted holdover of the Fajardo team. Work for Mamasapano continued in January 2022. Farjardo was replaced by Dimaranan.

Mamasapano had a private test screening on August 26, 2022 at the Baguio Country Club in Baguio. It was not yet picture locked, but was 99% complete at that time. It was screened in order for the production team to determine what kind of tweaking the film still needed.

== Release ==
Mamasapano was released in Philippine cinemas on December 25, 2022 as one of the eight official entries of the 2022 Metro Manila Film Festival. Had the film not been accepted as an entry for the 2022 Metro Manila Film Festival, it was planned for the film to premiere on November 30, 2022.

On December 1, 2023, the film was given a streaming release on Netflix.

== See also ==
Films depicting the Mamasapano clash:

- Motherland (2024 film), directed by Brillante Mendoza
- Oplan Exodus: SAF 44 – For God and Country, starring E. R. Ejercito; currently in development hell
