= Ricardo Marquez (police chief) =

Retired police general

Chief of the Philippine National Police
- In office July 16, 2015 – June 30, 2016
- Preceded by: P/DDir. Gen. Leonardo Espina (OIC / Acting)
- Succeeded by: P/Dir. Gen. Ronald dela Rosa

Personal details
- Born: Ricardo C. Marquez; August 28, 1960 (age 66) Philippines
- Education: Philippine Military Academy
- Police career
- Service: Philippine National Police
- Allegiance: Philippines
- Divisions: Office of the Directorate for Operations; Police Regional Office 1 (Ilocos); Nueva Ecija Provincial Police Office
- Service years: 1982–2016
- Rank: Police Director General

Ricardo C. Marquez (born August 28, 1960) is a Filipino retired police officer who served as the chief of the Philippine National Police.

== Career ==
=== Early years ===
A Caviteño, Marquez studied at the Philippine Military Academy in 1978 and graduated in the PMA class of 1982. He served as the provincial director of Nueva Ecija Provincial Police Office, Police Regional Office (PRO-1), and as the Camp Crame's Directorate for Operations.

=== PNP Chief ===
Marquez was appointed over contenders such as Chief Superintendent Raul Petrasanta (one of President Noynoy Aquino's close friend), Deputy Chief for Operations Deputy Director General Marcelo Garbo Jr., and Chief of Directorial Staff Deputy Director General Danilo Constantino.

He early retired on June 28, 2016, possibly to give way for incoming Chief Superintendent Bato dela Rosa.
