= Laura Alonso (soprano) =

Spanish operatic soprano (born 1976)

Laura Alonso Padín
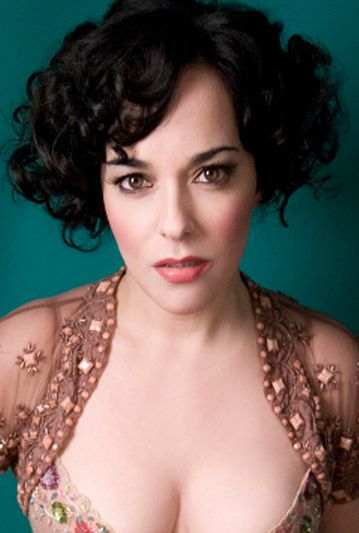
- Born: 2 January 1976 (age 49)
- Occupation: singer
- Website: laura-alonso.com

Laura Alonso Padín (born 2 January 1976), known as Laura Alonso, is a Spanish operatic soprano. She began her career in 1999 when she became a member of the Aalto Theatre in Essen, Germany. She has appeared as a guest artist with major theatres and musical ensembles internationally.

Laura Alonso Padín currently lives in Berlín .

== Early life and education ==
Born in Vilagarcía de Arousa (Galicia, Spain), Alonso earned university diplomas in both singing and the violin in her native country before pursuing further studies in Germany. A scholarship from the Alexander von Humboldt Foundation enabled her to study voice under Aldo Baldin, Anna Reynolds and Jean Cox and lied with Hartmut Höll at the Hochschule für Musik Karlsruhe.

== Career ==
In 1999, at 23 years of age, Alonso became a member of the Aalto Theatre in Essen, Germany. Over the past decade she has sung numerous roles with that opera house, including Blanche in Francis Poulenc's Dialogues of the Carmelites, Gilda in Giuseppe Verdi's Rigoletto, Mimí in Giacomo Puccini's La bohème, Pamina in Wolfgang Amadeus Mozart's The Magic Flute, Susanna in Mozart's The Marriage of Figaro, and Zdenka in Richard Strauss' Arabella among others. She is the recipient of the Aalto Theatre's Best Artist Award and performed at the theatre for the 2010 European City of Culture festivities.

As a guest artist, Alonso has made appearances at numerous concert venues and theatres internationally. In Europe she has sung at leading theatres in Pisa, Düsseldorf, Mannheim, Leipzig, Frankfurt, Darmstadt, Nancy, Braunschweig, Poissy, Freiburg, Lübeck, Barcelona, and Breno. Her performance credits also include appearances at the Auditorium in Rishon Le Zion (Israel), Palacio de las Bellas Artes in Mexico City, Teatro de Guanajuato, Philharmonie de Cologne, Musikhalle in Hamburg, Konzerthaus and Philharmonie in Berlin, Karlsruhe, Dortmund and Essen, Kuppel Saal in Hannover (Germany), Herodes Aticus in Athens, Concertgebouw in Amsterdam, Los Angeles Auditorium, and Palau de Valencia and Barcelona, among others. She has performed with several important conductors, including Rafael Frühbeck de Burgos, Heiko Mathias Förster, Philipp Jordan, Carlos Kalmar, Jiří Kout, Ion Marin, Víctor Pablo Pérez and Stefan Soltesz. Some of the other opera roles in her repertoire include Antonia, Zerbinetta, Susanna, Oscar, Lucia, Lulu, Giulia, Nannetta, Sophie, Elvira, Amina, and Violetta in La traviata.

She has collaborated with stage directors A. Pilavachi, De Tomasi, Johannes Schaaf, Pontiggia, Berndt, Schlingensief o Hilsdorf at the Las Palmas de Gran Canaria and Tenerife Festivals, at the Festival in Royaumont, Bregenzer Festspiele, Maestranza in Sevilla, at the Expo in Hannover, Innsbrucker Festwochen, Ille de France Festival, Santander Festival, at the Autumn Festival in Madrid, and the Opera Week in Berlin, among other musical events.

She sang Giulia in La scala di seta, performed during a tour with the Freiburger Barockorchester under the baton of Attilio Cremonesi. At the Berlin Staatsoper she appeared in with Ariadne auf Naxos. With her debut at the Innsbruck Festival (Austria) in the role of Cleopatra in Giulio Cesare in Egitto by Antonio Sartorio, she won the Diapason D'or, awarded by the French critics; the recording of the performance was issued on compact disc.

Other achievements include her role as Magda in La rondine, which she performed in Utrecht (Netherlands) with the TROS and Miguel Ángel Gómez Martínez as conductor, as well as her Salzburg performance in the role of Sandrina, in Mozart's La finta giardiniera, on the occasion of the Mozart Year 2006 with Doris Dörrie as stage manager.

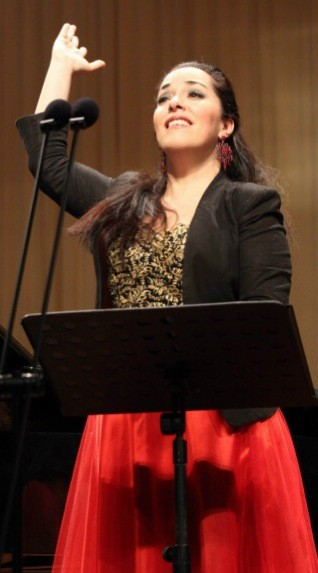
Laura Alonso

Other recent performances have taken place in Santander and La Coruña with the opera Carmen and also in La Coruña the Spanish premiere of The Rescue of Penelope by Benjamin Britten.

She has performed in some of the most important auditoriums and theatres in Spain, and at the end of 2007, she sang belcanto repertoire in the Opera Hall at Valladolid Auditorium, with the conductor Alejandro Posada and Canarian tenor Celso Albelo with duets and arias from Lakmé, Rigoletto, Elisir d'amore and Semiramide, alongside the Symphony Orchestra of Castilla y León.

She devotes most of the year to giving recitals and concerts. Next music key events are a Liederabend at the Juan March Foundation in Madrid, and another one at the Auditorio Conde Duque with the pianist Manuel Burgueras, as well as several Spanish music concerts in the United States.

Her most ambitious recording project was the belcanto arias album Col sorriso d'innocenza, in collaboration with the Philharmonic Orchestra of Malaga, which was published in December 2006.

The record label Columna Musica has recently released her CD collection of Galician songs Lúa descolorida, and another one will be released shortly with Spanish repertoire.

She has played the leading role as Rosario in her debut of the work Goyescas by Enrique Granados in 2009.

She has recently toured the main cities in Germany alongside the Chilean tenor Felipe Rojas, accompanied by the orchestra Neue Philharmonie Westfalen, singing exclusively Spanish zarzuelas.

She will make her debut in Alice Tully Hall in New York in November with the opera Las horas vacías (The Empty Hours) by Ricardo Llorca.

Recently, she has performed with the Symphony of Egypt. She also toured the most important theatres in China. Last May she played the role of Violetta in La traviata at the opera theatre in Darmstadt. She has also interpreted Lucia di Lammermoor in Illinois, likewise the role of Konstanze in The Abduction from the Seraglio by Mozart, in Illinois too.

She regularly sings with highly regarded conductors such as Stefan Soltesz, Ion Marin, Philipp Jordan, Zoltan Peszko, Victor Pablo Pérez, Heiko Matthias Förster, Antonello Allemandi, Frans Brüggen, Helmuth Rilling, Jiri Kout, Karel Mark Chichon or E. Plasson, in some of the more illustrious European theatres, like the Deutsche Oper am Rhein, Nationaltheater Mannheim, Staatsoper Berlin, Oper Leipzig, Oper Frankfurt, Staatstheater Darmstadt, Opera National de Lorraine, Staatstheater Braunschweig, Theater Poissy, Komische Oper Berlin, Theater Freiburg, Theater Lubeck, Brno in the Czech Republic.

She has collaborated with stage directors such as A. Pilavachi, De Tomasi, Johannes Schaaf, Pontiggia, Berndt, Schlingensief or Hilsdorf and performed at festivals in Las Palmas and Tenerife, the Festival Royaumont, Bregenzer Festspiele, Verbier Festival, Expo Hannover, Innsbrucker Festwochen, Île-de-France, Santander, Salzburg Festival, or the Opera Week of Berlin, among others.

Highlights in her career include her Giulia in La Scala di seta by Rossini, during a European tour with the Freiburger Barockorchester, under the baton of Attilio Cremonesi. Her performances in Ariadne auf Naxos at the Staatsoper in Berlin or her debut at the Festival of Innsbruck (Austria) with the role of Cleopatra in Giulio Cesare by Antonio Sartorio, published by ORF, which awarded her the eminent Diapason d'Or of the French critique.

Also deserving of mention are successes like her Magda in Puccini's La Rondine, which she performed in Utrecht (Netherlands) with the TROS and maestro Gómez Martinez, and the performances at the Salzburg Festival in the role of Sandrina from La Finta Giardiniera, on the occasion of the Mozart year with staging by Doris Dörrie. Another accomplishment was the great concert of Spanish songs with the Hamburg Symphony, and the famous Chinese guitarist Xuefei Yang at the Laeiszhalle Hamburg.

Her most ambitious recording project is the bel canto compact disc of arias: Col sorriso d'innocenza, a collaboration with the Philharmonic Orchestra of Málaga which was published in December 2006 and has received excellent reviews by the international operatic press. In 2009 she performed the role of Rosario in the German premiere of the work Goyescas.

She has also made her debut in the prestigious Alice Tully Hall in New York, which was the first premiere at the Lincoln Center of a Spanish opera: Las horas vacías (The Empty Hours) by Ricardo Llorca with great critical acclaim.

At the end of 2014 she was the soloist in the New Year's Eve concert of the distinguished Dallas Symphony Orchestra with maestro Dohnányi. She recently sung Verdi's Requiem in Leipzig, two concerts with the Orquesta Sinfónica del Estado de México, and Mozart's Requiem at the Opera in Egypt in El Cairo.

She recently sung Rosina in Barbiere di Siviglia at the Tel Aviv Opera, and has been Violetta in La Traviata in Darmstadt, in Rousse, in Bulgaria, at the Opera of Lviv in Ukraine, and at the theatre of Chengdu in China, where she will soon return to sing Carmen, after having done so with great success in Taiyuan with maestro Michael Köhler.

In 2017, she sang Elle in La voix humaine with pianist James Baillieu in Spain and made her Carnegie Hall Recital Debut in New York with the renowned pianist Yelena Kurdina. A new CD with Spanish songs will be released soon, accompanied by the Brazilian pianist Marcelo Amaral for Limen Music.

In the 2017/18 season she sang Liù from Turandot in China, and Violetta from La Traviata in Rovereto, Italy, and in many other Chinese cities.

In 2018, she was Violetta again in Zhejiang, China, and in Spain. In April 2018, she sang Spanish music with the Orchestra do Río Grande do Norte in Natale, Brasil, and will sing opera performances in Cluj-Napoca and also a recital at the Elbphilharmonie in Hamburg.

In 2019, she continues to sing Violetta again in La Traviata, Leonora (Il Trovatore), Aida, Tosca, Turandot (leading role) and she had many performances as Madama Butterfly, in Morelia (Mexico), in Santiago de Compostela in Galicia (Spain) and in many other cities in Spain. In October 2020, she would sing Puccini's Turandot in many important cities in Mexico.

Laura Alonso Padin holds masterclasses in the vast majority of countries where she gives recitals.

Laura Alonso Padín currently lives in Berlin.

== Awards ==
At the Aalto Theatre in Essen (Germany), she received the Best Artist Award, by popular acclaim, and she has sung again during the Ruhr 2010 European Capital of Culture in Essen in a lyric gala at the Aalto Theatre.

Alonso has won several singing awards at international competitions, among which we can highlight her first prize in the last Alfredo Kraus Competition as well as the Franco Corelli, Verviers or Jaume Aragall competitions.

With her début at the Innsbruck Festival (Austria) in the role of Cleopatra in Giulio Cesare by Antonio Sartorio, she won the Diapason d'Or, awarded by the French critics.

== Discography ==
- Col sorriso d'innocenza Belcanto Arias by Laura Alonso. Conductor: Alexander Livenson. Orquesta Filarmónica de Malaga. Composers: i.a. Bellini, Rossini, Donizetti. Label: Columna Musica, Spain.
- Lua Descolorida Music from Galicia with Laura Alonso, soprano. Juan Manuel Varela, piano. Songs by Osvaldo Golijov and Antón García Abril. Label: Columna Musica, Spain.
- Antoloxía Vol. 1 A canción de Concerto: Antoloxía Vol. 1. Laura Alonso, soprano. Manuel Burgueras, piano. Cancións sobre textos literarios galegos. Edicións Xerais de Galicia.
- Tutto Verdi from the Aalto Theatre in Essen. Charity event for the reconstruction of La Fenice in Venice.
- Na Boca Das Camelias Laura Alonso, soprano. Juan Manuel Varela, piano. Music from Galicia by various composers.
- Giulio Cesare in Egitto, Antonio Sartorio. Conductor: Attilio Cremonesi. Innsbrucker Barockfestspiele. Laura Alonso as Cleopatra. Label: ORF, Austria
- Suau la teva veu. Laura Alonso, soprano. Works by Moisés Bertrán. Columna Música. Catalan songs.
