= Laura Alonso =

Laura Alonso may refer to:

- Laura Alonso (soprano) (born 1976), Spanish operatic soprano
- Laura Alonso (politician) (born 1972), Argentine politician
