= Verzosa =

Verzosa is a surname. Notable people with the surname include:

- Alfredo Verzosa (1877–1954), Filipino bishop
- Jesus Verzosa (born 1954), Filipino police officer
- Kylie Verzosa (born 1992), Filipino actress
- Sam Verzosa (born 1987), Filipino businessman
