= Khalifa Islamiyah Mindanao =

Organization

- Leaders: Zulkifli Abdhir †; Amir M Amir Abtol Rahman; Amir Kuptu; Amir Humam Abdul Najid
- Dates active: 2011–2013
- Split from: Jemaah Islamiyah; Abu Sayyaf; Moro Islamic Liberation Front
- Merged into: Maute Group
- Country: Philippines
- Active regions: Central Mindanao
- Ideology: Islamic fundamentalism
- Size: +5

Khalifa Islamiyah Mindanao (KIM) was a dedicated organization that sought to establish an independent state in Mindanao, Philippines. The group was led by an Afghan-trained cleric known as Humam Abdul Najid. It was sometimes described as an umbrella organization composed of the Jemaah Islamiyah (JI), the Abu Sayyaf (ASG) and the Moro Islamic Liberation Front (MILF). According to the Philippine Institute for Peace, Violence and Terrorism Research, the KIM had five founders; Zulkifli Abdhir, who was killed on January 25, 2015 by Special Action Force officers during the raid that culminated in the Mamasapano clash, Amir M, Amir Abtol Rahman, Amir Kuptu and Amir Humam Abdul Najid. The group had reportedly adopted the flag of the Islamic State of Iraq and the Levant.

Armed Forces of the Philippines chief, Emmanuel Bautista, confirmed the existence of the group in August 2013, although reports about the group were made as early as two years before.

== See also ==
- Peace process with the Bangsamoro in the Philippines
- Insurgency in the Philippines
