= KMM =

KMM is a three-letter abbreviation that may refer to:

- Kennedy Miller Mitchell, Australian film, television and video game production company
- Kaspersky Mobile Security, mobile security suite.
- Kesatuan Melayu Muda, Malayan political organization
- Krantikari Manuwadi Morcha, Indian political organization
- Krav Maga Maor, a system of self-defense and hand-to-hand combat system
- Kröller-Müller Museum, the Netherlands
- New Politics Party, in Thailand
- Kumpulan Mujahidin Malaysia, terrorist organization
