= Zainuri Kamaruddin =

- Nickname: Abu Talhah
- Born: 1966/67; Bota, Perak, Malaysia
- Died: 13 January 2017 Raqqa, Syria
- Allegiance: Kumpulan Mujahidin Afghanistan (late 1980s); Kumpulan Mujahidin Malaysia (1998–2001); Ajnad al-Sham (2014); Islamic State (2014–2017)
- Branch: Military of ISIL
- Service years: 1980s, 1998–2001, 2014–2017
- Rank: Top commander
- Commands: KMM's Selangor chapter Katibah Nusantara
- Conflicts: Afghan Civil War (1989–92): Battle of Jalalabad; Syrian Civil War: Raqqa campaign (2016–2017) †

Zainuri Kamaruddin, also known by his nom de guerre Abu Talhah, (1966/67 – 13 January 2017) was a prominent Malaysian Islamist militant who fought as commander for Kumpulan Mujahidin Malaysia and later the Islamic State of Iraq and the Levant's Katibah Nusantara. In May 2016, Zainuri was declared "public enemy No 1" by Deputy Prime Minister of Malaysia Ahmad Zahid Hamidi due to his skills in the construction of improvised explosive devices. He was killed by an airstrike on Raqqa during Operation Wrath of Euphrates.

== Biography ==
=== Early life and War in Afghanistan ===
Zainuri was born around 1966/67 in Bota, Perak, and studied at Madrasah Misbahul Falah, Baling District, Kedah before continuing his studies at the Abu Bakar Islamic University in Karachi, Pakistan. There, he joined the Islamist group Kumpulan Mujahidin Afghanistan and went to Afghanistan, fighting against the Democratic Republic of Afghanistan for two years. Zainuri participated in battles in Kunar Province, Khost Province and the Battle of Jalalabad, gaining "vast battlefield experience".

Afterwards, he returned to Malaysia, where he worked as a technician, though sometime in the 1990s he also began to plan terrorist attacks in his homeland. In 1998, Zainuri was working on a bomb; the device exploded prematurely, destroying his home and killing his wife, Rahimah Osman. He managed to cover this up by telling the police that the detonation was the result of a failing gas cylinder. Over fifteen years later, Zainuri admitted to other ISIL fighters that he still felt guilty about his first wife's death. Despite this, he never told Rahimah's younger sister, whom he eventually married, that he was responsible for Rahimah's death.

=== Activity as KMM leader ===
Around 1998, he joined Kumpulan Mujahidin Malaysia (KMM), and became the chief of the group's Selangor chapter. According to the Malaysian Special Branch, Zainuri was linked to the attempted assassination of Nivashini Rajeswaran on 25 May 1998, and the assassination of Lunas assemblyman Dr Joe Fernandez. In 2000, he and another KMM militant were involved in bomb attacks in Kuala Lumpur. Zainuri also participated in a KMM raid on the Guar Chempedak police station with the aim of capturing M16 rifles for the insurgency against the government, and helped planning the Southern Bank robbery in Petaling Jaya in 2001, in course of which the KMM militants hoped to acquire funds for their rebellion. Zainuri did not participate in the heist himself, however, deeming it to risky; when his accomplices were promptly caught, they betrayed him to the police. When he was arrested, the police seized "firearms, ammunition and several types of explosives" in his house.

For his involvement in the robbery, and the possession of firearms and explosives, Zainuri was jailed for ten years under the Internal Security Act 1960.

=== Operations in Syria and death ===
After being released, Zainuri left Malaysia in April 2014 and travelled to Syria to fight in the local civil war; he left his second wife, Rahimah's sister, behind. In Syria, Zainuri initially joined Ajnad al-Sham, but soon switched allegiance to the Islamic State of Iraq and the Levant. In August 2014, he and another former KMM member, Zainan Harith, were ambushed by the Syrian Army; Zainan was killed, while Zainuri was wounded at the neck and thigh. At some point, he became one of the commanders of the Malay-speaking ISIL frontline unit Katibah Nusantara. In this position, Zainuri recruited new members for ISIL through Facebook, trained child soldiers for Katibah Nusantara, and issued orders to ISIL cells in Malaysia. Due to his activities and his status as "rather influential personality" among ISIL supporters, he was closely monitored by the Royal Malaysia Police.

Zainuri won some renown by appearing in an ISIL propaganda video in May 2016, during which he burned his Malaysian passport to show that he had severed all links to his homeland's government. He also said that one day the Malay Archipelago would be "swarming" with ISIL fighters who would bring the fight to Indonesia and Malaysia, the latter of which he called an "infidel state" with its people being "sinners". After this appearance in a propaganda video, the Malaysian police learned of his experience in building improvised explosive devices and his desire to share these skills with other ISIL fighters. As result, Deputy Prime Minister of Malaysia Ahmad Zahid Hamidi declared during a press conference in May 2016 that Zainuri had become "public enemy No 1".

Thereafter, Zainuri continued to fight for ISIL in Syria until January 2017, when he contacted his family for the last time. One week later, on 13 January 2017, he and two other Malaysian ISIL fighters were killed by an airstrike on Raqqa during Operation Wrath of Euphrates. He was 50 when he died.
