= Mamasapano clash =

2015 shootout between Philippine police and Islamist militants in Maguindanao

- Part of the Moro conflict and the war on terror
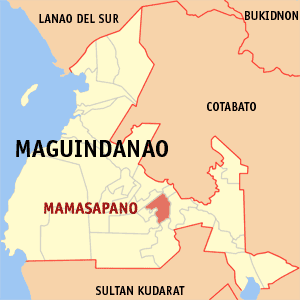
- Map of Mamasapano, Maguindanao del Sur
Date	January 25, 2015; 11 years ago
Location	Tuknalipao, Mamasapano; Maguindanao (now Maguindanao del Sur), Philippines
Result	Pyrrhic Philippine government victory: Targeted terrorist Zulkifli Abdhir killed; Philippine government forces suffer heavy losses and retreats; 55th Special Action Company almost entirely wiped out

Belligerents
Philippines: Presidential Anti-Organized Crime Commission; Philippine National Police; Special Action Force; United States (intelligence, alleged ground troop support); Armed Forces of the Philippines: WESTMINCOM; 6th Infantry Division; Federal Bureau of Investigation (allegedly)	Jemaah Islamiyah–linked militants Moro Islamic Liberation Front; Bangsamoro Islamic Freedom Fighters; Private militias (allegedly)

Commanders and leaders
(Philippines) Benigno Aquino III (Philippines) Paquito Ochoa Jr. (Philippines) Alan Purisima (Philippines) Getulio Napeñas (Philippines) Rustico O. Guerrero (Philippines) Edmundo Pangilinan; Capt. Ryan Ballesteros Pabalinas †; Capt. John Garry Alcantara Erana †; Capt.Max Jim Ramirez Tria †	Zulkifli Abdhir X Abdul Basit Usman; Amin Bacu Ustadz Zacaria Guma; Ameril Umbra Kato; Bahnarin Ampatuan (allegedly)

Units involved
SAF: 9 units: 1st and 4th Special Action Battalion (SAB); 84th Special Action Company (Seaborne); 41st 42nd, 43rd, 44th, 45th, and 55th Special Action Companies (SAC); Intelligence, Surveillance, Target, Acquisition and Reconnaissance (ISTAR) unit; Light Armor Unit (LAU); Command Group and Service Support	2 bomb experts 108 and 105 Base Command; BIFF 1st Brigade

Strength
392: 84SAC (Seaborne): 38; 41SAC: 44; 42SAC: 45; 43SAC: 42; 44SAC: 43; 45SAC: 44; 55SAC: 36; ISTAR: 13; 1SAB: 44; 4SAB: 14; LAU: 10; Command/Service Support: 19	800 unknown

Casualties and losses
64 killed (MILF claim; including militiamen, informants and guides) SAF: 44 killed, 15-16 wounded: 84SAC (Seaborne): 9 killed and 14 wounded; 55SAC: 35 out of 36 killed	Jemaah Islamiyah: 1 killed (Zulkifli Abdhir); MILF and BIFF: 17 to 18 casualties 250 killed (Napeñas’ claim; dismissed and debunked by the MILF and local government of Mamasapano)
- Civilian casualties: 5 killed

Operation Exodus Oplan Exodus
- Part of the Moro conflict
- Location: Maguindanao, Philippines
- Planned: As early as 2014
- Planned by: Alan Purisima and Getulio Napeñas of the Philippine National Police – Special Action Force; Federal Bureau of Investigation (allegedly)
- Target: Four nipa huts were searched to arrest Zulkifli Abdhir and Abdul Basit Usman
- Objective: Primarily the arrest of Zulkifli Abdhir. Secondary objective to arrest Abdul Basit Usman
- Date: 03:00 – (PST)
- Executed by: Philippine National Police – Special Action Force; United States Army Special Forces (allegedly); Federal Bureau of Investigation (allegedly)
- Outcome: Zulkifli Abdhir killed

The Mamasapano clash was a shootout that took place during a police operation by the Special Action Force (SAF) of the Philippine National Police (PNP) on January 25, 2015, in Tukanalipao, Mamasapano, then-undivided Maguindanao (which is now Maguindanao del Sur). The operation, codenamed Oplan Exodus, was intended to capture or kill wanted Malaysian terrorist and bomb-maker Zulkifli Abdhir and other Malaysian terrorists or high-ranking members of the Moro Islamic Liberation Front (MILF).

Originally a mission to serve arrest warrants for high-ranking terrorists, it led to the deaths of 44 members of the SAF, 17 or 18 from the MILF and BIFF, five civilians, and the death of Abdhir confirmed by the U.S. Federal Bureau of Investigation (FBI) and the PNP at 6:30 p.m. on February 4, 2015, through a matching DNA result. Abdhir was one of FBI's most wanted terrorists. Getulio Napeñas, the relieved SAF commander, estimated about 250 deaths from his assumption that each SAF sniper may have taken down at least 20 members of the MILF, BIFF and private militias during the encounter although this was not confirmed. Napenas' estimate was also debunked by the MILF and by the local government of Mamasapano.

The mission itself was declared successful once the target was neutralized. The severity of the policemen's situation prompted the government peace panel to intervene and request a ceasefire from the MILF. The Armed Forces of the Philippines (AFP) also conducted a rescue operation to save the remaining 29 SAF survivors who were encircled by the enemies.

The mission was called Oplan Exodus, initially misattributed as Oplan Wolverine by the local media. Oplan Wolverine refers to three of the other nine prior operation attempts targeting Marwan; Oplan Wolverine 1, 2, and 3 launched in December 2012, March and May 2014, respectively, by the PNP-SAF. The incident caused the Congress of the Philippines to halt the passage of the Bangsamoro Basic Law, effectively endangering the peace process between the government and the MILF.

== Incident ==
On Sunday, January 25, 2015, three platoons of the elite SAF police squad entered the guerrilla enclave of Tukanalipao, Mindanao, Philippines, with the goal of detaining two high-ranking Jemaah Islamiyah-affiliated, improvised-explosive-device experts, Zulkifli Abdhir (also known as Marwan) and Abdul Basit Usman. The SAF troops raided the hut where they believed Marwan was located, and the man they believe to be Marwan engaged them in a firefight and was killed. The SAF initially planned to take his body for identification. However, the shooting alerted the BIFF and MILF 118th Command in the area.

The SAF just cut off a finger, took a photo, and left his body there. By 6:18 AM UTC+8 (PST), an SMS message was sent by the Commander of SAF 61D Battalion to SAF Director Getulio Napeñas that they were pinned down at coordinates 6.92489°N 124.52047°E. What followed was a bloody encounter that left 44 SAF, 18 MILF, and 5 BIFF dead.

On Wednesday, February 4, 2015, the FBI confirmed to the PNP that the DNA sample from the finger matched that of Marwan's brother detained in a U.S. facility. A MILF spokesman accused the SAF squads of initiating the firefight, claiming that the rebels acted in self-defense, and proposed the continuation of the peace process.

Abu Misri Mama, BIFF spokesman, said that his rebel group's relationship with the MILF's 105th Command headed by Ustadz Zacaria Guma is positive. "We're all family," Mama commenting on BIFF's relationship with Guma's unit. Mama said that there is no distinction between BIFF members and members of Guma's unit and claims that all of them are either relatives or friends of each other. It was reported that Guma's unit would engage other MILF units over disputes such as clan feuds. It was also reported that Guma was not on good terms with other MILF units which Guma viewed as "Munafiq", or hypocrites.

A military intelligence officer who spoke on condition of anonymity said that BIFF leader Ameril Umbra Kato ordered the killing of the SAF members by his group and members of the MILF involved in the incident. The official also quoted Kato as saying “Leave no one alive and take all their firearms, ammunition, and personal belongings.” Another unnamed colonel from the Philippine Army confirmed the information and said that SAF personnel who were wounded were shot dead by BIFF members.

A private armed group led by Datu Bahnarin Ampatuan was reportedly among those involved in the killings of the SAF members. Bahnarin Ampatuan, who was also implicated in the Maguindanao massacre case, is the brother of Mamasapano mayor Benzar Ampatuan. Bahnarin and Benzar Amputuan were rivals at the 2010 Mayoral elections. Benzar expressed doubt of his brother's participation and believes that Bahnarin would not associate himself with groups like the BIFF or people like Abdul Basit Usman who attempted to kill Benzar's grandfather.

== Prior operations ==
The Philippine National Police planned ten operations, including Oplan Exodus which was implemented on January 25, 2015, targeting bomb expert Zulkifli Abdhir, also known as Marwan. Oplan Exodus, the last of the ten operations planned by the PNP was the only operation successful in neutralizing Marwan.

Operation (Oplan)	Scope	Date of implementation	Result
Pitas	Parang, Sulu	December 2010	Executed
Smartbomb	Butig, Lanao del Sur	July 2012	Executed
Wolverine	Mamasapano, Maguindanao	December 2012	Mission aborted
Cyclops	Marawi	April 2013	Executed
Cyclops 2	Marawi	June 2013	Mission aborted
Wolverine 2	Mamasapano, Maguindanao	March 2014	Mission aborted
Wolverine 3	Mamasapano, Maguindanao	May 2014	Mission aborted
Terminator	Mamasapano, Maguindanao	November 2014	Mission aborted
Terminator 2	Mamasapano, Maguindanao	December 2014	Mission aborted
Exodus	Mamasapano, Maguindanao	January 2015	Primary Objective Complete – Marwan killed

== Casualties ==
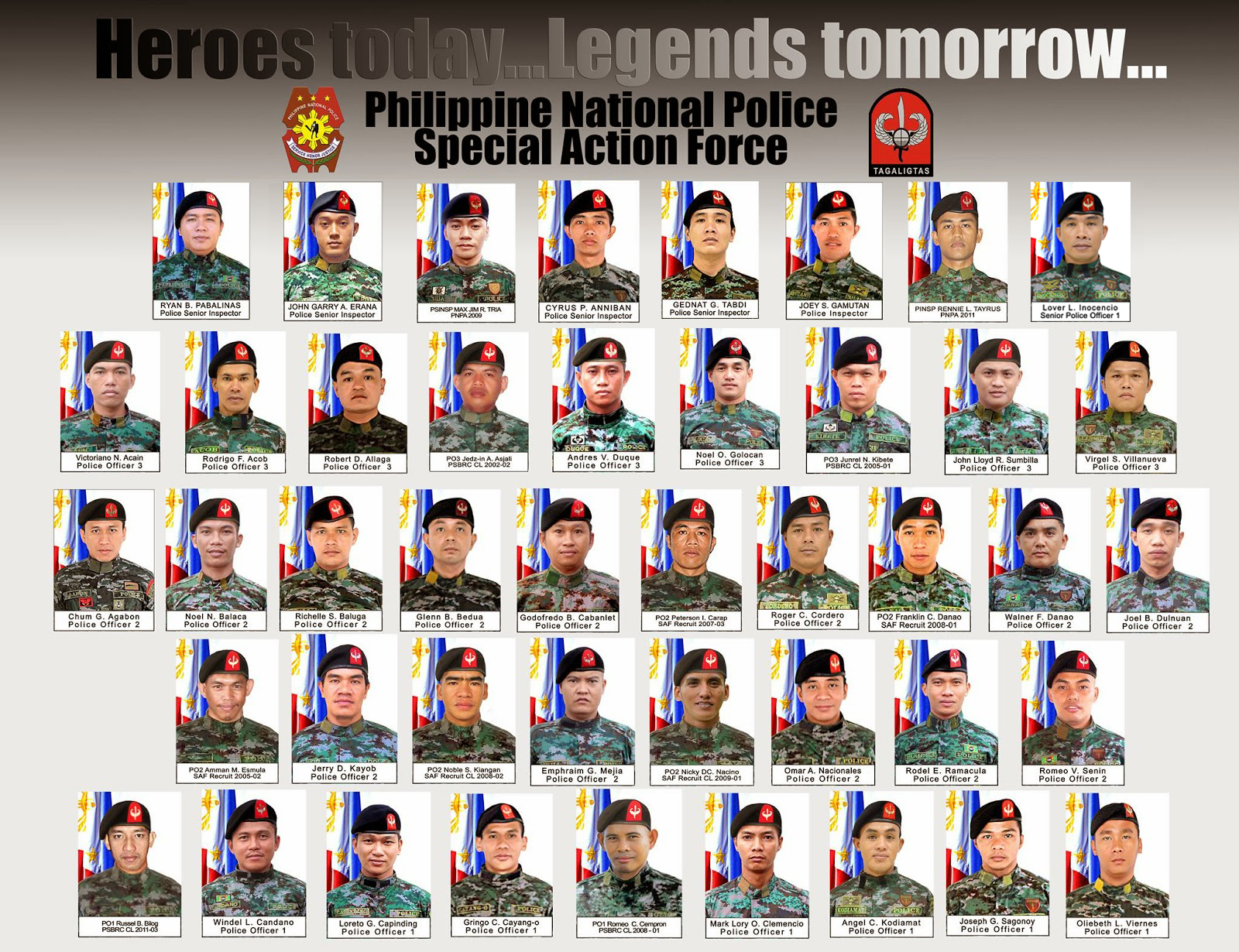
The 44 police officers who perished during the clash

=== Special Action Force ===
A total of 44 SAF personnel were killed during the encounter. #Fallen44 became a worldwide trend on Twitter as an effort to honor the 44 slain SAF members. The SAF casualties were later dubbed as the Fallen 44. The incident saw one of the highest fatalities of government forces in a single peace time operation.

=== Allegations of United States Army casualties ===
According to a local farmer, a "blue-eyed" American soldier was among the casualties. However, the U.S. embassy later denied any involvement in the clash.

=== Targets ===
The two agencies that cooperated during the battle, the Philippine National Police and the Federal Bureau of Investigation, confirmed on Wednesday February 4, 2015, at 6:30 p.m. that Zulkifli Abdhir, also known as Marwan, was killed during the Mamasapano encounter based on a matching DNA test. The MILF later said that, based on an intelligence report that they had received, Marwan (Abdhir) was dead as a result of an encounter. MILF chairman Al-Hajj Murad Ebrahim said that, based on their information, Marwan who was in his nipa hut home was surrounded by SAF troops and was reported to open fire first and that SAF officers were able to shoot Marwan dead. Marwan's body was reportedly left at the hut and was immediately buried. Ebrahim also said that Abdul Basit Usman, who was also pursued by SAF troops, was able to escape.

=== Moro Islamic Liberation Front ===
Mohagher Iqbal said that 18 MILF personnel were killed during combat, while 14 were injured.

On the other hand, according to one MILF official, 17 of their members were killed in the clash. Then PO2 Christopher Lalan, lone survivor of the clash said, "at least 11 members of the combined forces of MILF, BIFF, and private armed groups were taken down by SAF troopers from his Company". Former PNP-SAF head Chief Supt Napenas estimates that each of his SAF snipers may have shot down at least 20 attackers in which the total casualties are 250, but this was met with skepticism since there was no bodycount and there was no acceptable level of evidence to prove his claim and that the claim itself is hard to believe. One MILF official even said that "they may have counted stones instead of bodies".

=== Civilians ===
Moro group, Suara Bangsamoro, claimed in a post-fact-finding mission report that at least 7 civilians were killed and 3 others were injured during the Mamasapano clash. Jerome Succor Aba, national spokesperson of the group, said that residents of Barangay Tukanalipao were preparing for their daily activities when SAF commandos entered the area and opened fire at the residence of the Panangulon family, resulting in the death of five-year-old child Sarah Panangulon and leaving her parents Tots and Samrah wounded. Badrudin Langalan, a farmer, was found dead hogtied at the wooden bridge in the barangay. Aba describes Langalan's body as being riddled with bullets and eyes as gouged out. Aba said that five other people were killed who were heading to the mosque in Sitio Inugog and said that based from stories of residents that the SAF was behind their deaths. "Civilians bore the brunt of the botched operations, they were made to suffer on suspicions that they are harboring terrorists. Suara calls for justice and recognition of the true victims and accountability to the police and Aquino administration," Aba said.

It was reported that Badruddin Langalan was killed by stray bullets. Badruddin's wife Sarah Langalan recalled that her husband went to charge his cellphone but never came back. 16-year-old Saat Manadal was also wounded due to stray bullets and is under the intensive care unit of the Cotabato Regional Medical Center.

== Aftermath ==
The incident sparked the internal displacement of several hundred families amidst fears of continued clashes.

The chairman of the Philippine Senate Committee on Local Government, Bongbong Marcos, stated that hearings regarding the involvement of security and armed forces provisions of the Bangsamoro Basic Law were halted. Senator Alan Peter Cayetano also claimed that his coalition will withdraw its support for the Bangsamoro Basic Law, endangering the ongoing peace process. While the Philippine House of Representatives also suspended its hearings on the Bangsamoro Basic Law, Speaker Feliciano Belmonte said that the lower house remained supportive of the measure, although it had been somewhat "eroded" due to the killings. He also took note that unlike in the Senate where Cayetano and JV Ejercito had withdrawn their sponsorship of the bill, no congressman had done the same, and that the measure would be passed on time.

The PNP relieved Special Action Force head Director Getulio Napeñas of his post following the clash in Maguindanao; he was replaced by deputy SAF director Chief Superintendent Noli Taliño. At a press briefing at Camp Crame, PNP Deputy Director General Leonardo Espina and Secretary of the Interior and Local Government Mar Roxas announced the establishment of a board of inquiry tasked with the investigation of the police encounter in Maguindanao. The PNP released the board of inquiry in March 2015.

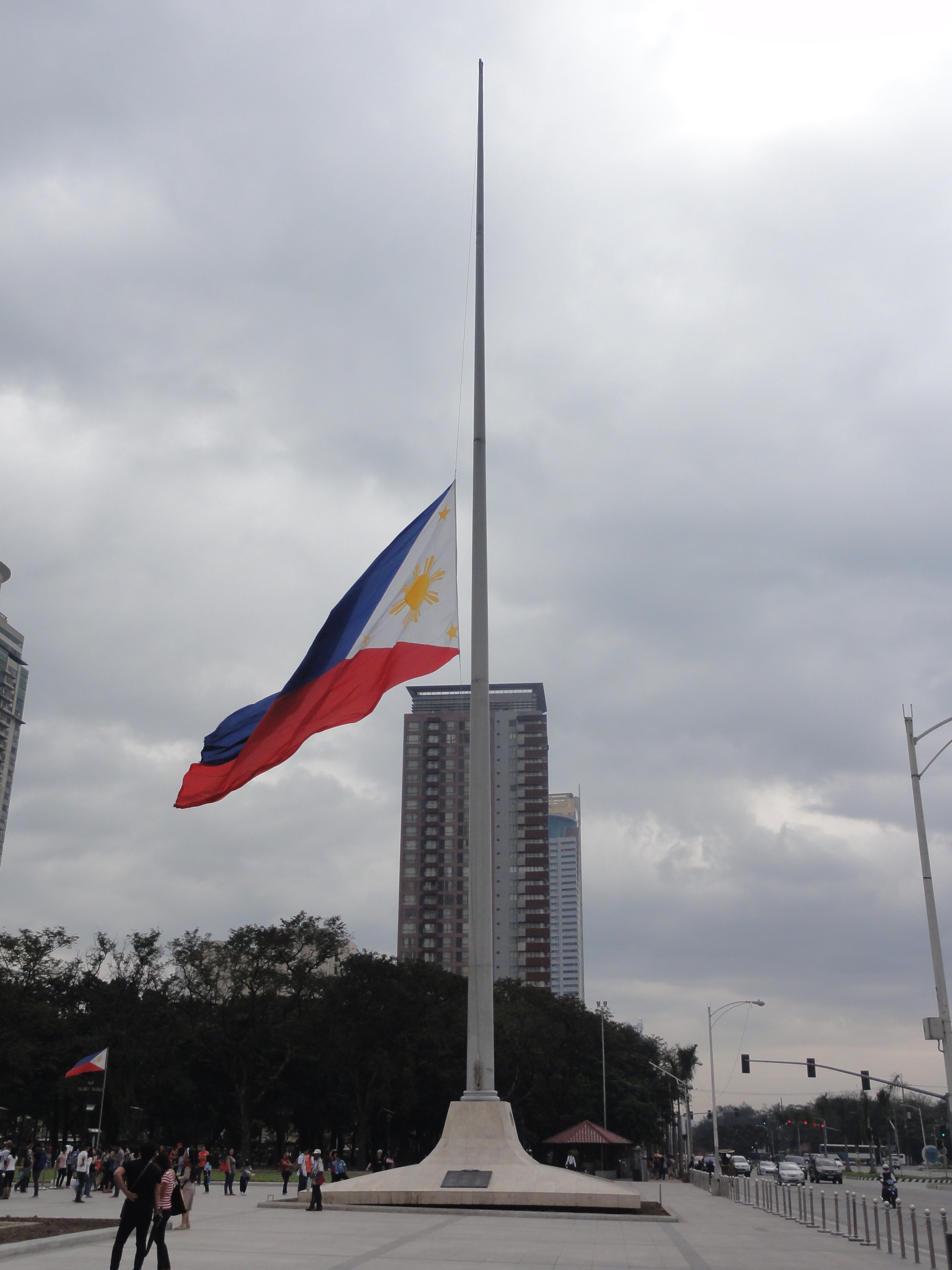
The Philippine flag at Rizal Park, Manila, flown at half-mast on January 30, 2015, during the National Day of Mourning in the aftermath of the Mamasapano clash

President Aquino delivered a televised address on January 28. He said that the MILF should identify those who were involved in the killing of the members of the SAF, return the slain SAF members' guns and personal belongings, and allow the government to continue their operation against the terrorists. In addition, he also declared January 30 as a "National Day of Mourning", and pressed for the immediate Congressional approval of the proposed Bangsamoro Basic Law. Aquino admitted there had been a "lack of coordination" among the government forces and the MILF, that he and suspended police chief Alan Purisima personally knew of the operations, and that both Roxas and Espina were not notified of it beforehand. Furthermore, Aquino was not able to explain why these two officials were unaware of the operations. Earlier, a Manila Standard Today article claimed that Purisima not only knew of the operation, but even took control of the operations despite being suspended from duty.

A video of the killing of allegedly one of the SAF members was uploaded on YouTube, but has since been taken down from the site; those who manage to download the video are sold in DVD format in the streets of Manila. Also, the video was uploaded in social media site Facebook.

In an effort to mend relations with the villagers in the area where the clash occurred, in 2015 the government began construction of a bridge over the river by the field where the 44 policemen were killed. The bridge was named "The Bridge of Peace".

Meanwhile, when the remains of the 44 slain SAF men arrived at Villamor Air Base, President Benigno S. Aquino III was nowhere to be found as he chose to attend the inauguration of a Mitsubishi Motors Car Plant instead. His meeting with the relatives of the victims meanwhile was deemed insensitive among the members of the bereaved families.

Eight months later, on September 22, 2015, criminal charges were filed by the NBI against 90 individuals, 25 from the MILF, 12 from the BIFF, and 52 from private armed group or with unknown affiliation who involved in the clash.

A few months after the clash, Abdul Basit Usman, another target of the operation, was killed by MILF after being found hiding on a base command's camp. Initial reports said that he was betrayed by his own guards, or infighting among them.

In January 2016, retired Police Chief Superintendent Diosdado Valeroso claimed he had a recording of an exchange of words between a government official and a lawmaker as part of the evidence to be submitted in the Senate investigation on Mamasapano clash.

On the incident's first anniversary, President Aquino conferred the Medalya ng Kagitingan or the PNP Medal of Valor awards to Sr. Insp. Gednat Tabdi and PO2 Romeo Cempron, while the Medalya ng Kabayanihan or the PNP Distinguished Conduct Medal given to 42 other slain SAF troopers in the PNP's commemoration event on January 25, 2016. The Moro Islamic Liberation Front offered prayers and remembrance for the families of their casualties.

In February 2017, President Rodrigo Duterte declared January 25 of every year as the National Day of Remembrance for the SAF 44. On January 25, 2019, marking the fourth year since the clash, the families of slain soldiers gathered at the Supreme Court, seeking justice.

On January 25, 2023, marking the ninth year since the clash, Bongbong Marcos led the National Remembrance of SAF44 at the Philippine National Police Academy in Camp General Mariano N. Castañeda, Tartaria, Silang, Cavite with Benjamin Abalos, Benjamin Acorda and Getulio Napeñas. Marcos urged Filipinos to continue working hard towards ‘Bagong Pilipinas’. The Nueva Ecija Provincial Police Office, by Police Colonel Richard Caballero, led at the Parade Grounds the wreath-laying and candle-lighting ceremony to honor the 44 Philippine National Police-Special Action Force troopers. Davao City Police Office (DCPO) and Police Regional Office (PRO) XI, by Lt Gen Michael John Dubria, PNP acting chief for operations, led the 9th anniversary of SAF 44 in Camp Catitipan, Police Regional Office XI. PBGen. Alden Delvo, Regional Director of Police Regional Office XI led the honors at the “Bantayog sa mga Bayanging Pulis.”

== Mamasapano Board of inqury ==
The following are the members of the Board of inquiry (BOI) tasked to investigate the Mamasapano clash:

Rank	Name	Position
Director	Benjamin Magalong	CIDG director; BOI chief
Director	Catalino Rodriguez	Director of the Directorate for Research and Development (DRD)
Chief Superintendent	John Sosito	Executive Officer of DIPO-Eastern Mindanao
Senior Superintendent	Roberto Po	Public Information Office (PIO-PNP)
Senior Superintendent	Ronald dela Rosa	former City Director of Davao City Police
Senior Superintendent	Cesar Hawthorne Binag	former NCRPO officer
Senior Superintendent	Benigno Durana Jr.	former Provincial Director of Aklan PPO
Chief Inspector	David Joy Duarte	officer at the Center for Police Strategic Management

== Reactions ==
=== Local ===
==== General protests ====
Local police forces as well as the military personnel wore black armbands in sympathy with their fallen comrades.

Thousands of policemen marched on the streets over various locations in the Philippines with some starting at dawn. About 5,000 policemen, firemen, and jail guards in their uniforms trooped from the Libingan ng mga Bayani to the National Capital Regional Police Office (NCRPO) headquarters in Taguig, and called for justice for the members of the elite SAF men killed. The walk also included some of the families of the victims and other civilians, even members of a U.S. delegation from the Indiana State Police, who were visiting the country. Almost in complete attendance were the members of the PNPA Kaisang Bisig Class of 2009, who lost three of their batchmates in the massacre: Senior Insp. Gednat Tabdi, Senior Insp. Max Jim Tria, and Senior Insp. John Gary Erana.

Calls for justice was strong from members of the PNP in Bicol Region. Policemen across the regions also offered Mass, flowers, and lighted candles in front of their police stations to honor their slain colleagues. They also covered their badges with black ribbons and wore black armbands. In the Bicol Region as well, 19 senior inspectors leading municipal police offices shaved their heads to show sympathy with the families of their three batch mates belonging to the 2009 class of the Philippine National Police Academy (PNPA), who died in the clash. Their female batch mate, Senior Insp. Sheena Guzman, chief of police of Canaman town in Camarines Sur, shaved her head. Senior Insp. Rey Anthony Villanueva of the Regional Intelligence Division in Bicol, said what happened in Mamasapano was a "massacre".

In Boac, Marinduque, local officials, government employees, policemen, firemen, and barangay officials gathered in front of the "Bantayog sa mga Nagtanggol ng Inang Bayan" to offer their sympathies. A three-minute moment of silence was observed as well.

In Isabela, the Catholic faithful joined police officers in a "walk for peace" in Santiago in which the "running priest", Fr. Robert Reyes, who led the activity, said the walk expressed their grief for the fallen officers, three of whom were from Isabela. "Together we pray and say, 'Peace walks, peace talks' for indeed if we walk together for peace, peace will begin to speak and spread through us," he said.

In Cebu, parishioners joined the Santiago policemen in a 2-kilometer march to the Saint Francis of Assisi Church. At least 700 policemen from different units in Cebu province braved the early morning drizzle to show their sympathy for the families of the slain SAF policemen. Supt. Rodolfo Albotra Jr., head of the Philippine National Police Alumni Association Inc. in Cebu organized the walk. "This is just a show of sympathy. We still believe in the government that they will not turn their backs on this one. We expect that justice will be served,” he said.

In Iloilo, at least 150 policemen paid tribute to the slain SAF members in a simple ceremony in Sta. Barbara town. The policemen who wore black ribbons donated cash totaling about ₱25,000 for the families of the slain commandos.

==== Public figures ====
Lucena Bishop Emilio Marquez told reporters here that any talk of amnesty for the culprits behind the deaths of 44 elite commandos was "very wrong". "Giving a pardon to whoever is behind the bloody killing is reprehensible. All persons responsible must suffer. They should be sent to jail." "Filipinos are demanding no more than the truth and genuine justice", assailing the brutality inflicted on the 44 commandos and offered a Mass specifically for the SAF 44 and their families attended by uniformed personnel led by Senior Supt. Ronaldo Genaro Ylagan, Quezon police chief, occupied several pews. Some of the policemen, several of whom came with their families, were in tears as the bishop delivered his homily.

Former President Joseph Estrada expressed condemnation towards the rebels saying that a peace talk with them would not work and believes a declaration of an all-out war against them is only the solution to the peace process in Mindanao. Former President Fidel V. Ramos remains supportive of the peace process even though he explains that the finalization of the peace process may be after President Benigno Aquino III's term. Despite his expression of support towards the peace process, Ramos still criticized Aquino saying “There should be no hesitation on the part of the commander in chief. Otherwise, it will be part of your legacy to be always hesitant, flip-flopping.” He criticized Aquino, who is also the commander-in-chief of the PNP and the AFP, for his apparent poor strategic direction and asserts that it is the soldier, the policeman, the law enforcer, the guardian of security that suffers because of his decisions. Ramos also insists that Aquino should have made consultation with retired police officers and soldiers before the security operation in Mamasapano.

Reigning Mister International 2014, Police Officer (PO2) Mariano Perez Flomata Jr. ("Neil Perez") said his victory is honored for the families and loved ones of the "Fallen 44". Seven of his batchmates who killed in the clash were from the Mabalasik Class of 2008 of the National Police Training Institute (NPTI), Philippine Public Safety College (PPSC).

From 2015 to 2022, Davao City mayor and later vice president Sara Duterte had her profile pictures on Facebook and Instagram set to a memorial image that reads: "Rest in peace SAF 44".

==== Militant groups ====
Leftist militant group Bagong Alyansang Makabayan (Bayan), led by Renato Reyes Jr., questioned President Benigno Aquino III regarding allegations that he knew of the police operation citing a prior report by the Manila Standard. The newspaper report claimed that Aquino was aware of the operation and that Aquino assigned suspended PNP Alan Purisima to lead the operation without the knowledge of DILG secretary Mar Roxas. It also claimed that the operation was a directive from the United States which "even offered a $5-million bounty for Marwan's capture." Bayan added that it supports the peace process while calling for an investigation on the incident in Mamasapano and called for those who were behind the operation to be held unaccountable. Leftist group Anakpawis also made a similar statement, blaming Aquino for the aftermath of the Mamasapano clash suspecting that Aquino was mum on the alleged direct role of suspended police chief Purisima and the United States. The group also appealed to the public to be cautious in blaming the MILF for the incident.

The Communist Party of the Philippines expressed sympathies to the victims of the Mamasapano clash. "The CPP sympathizes with the families of the police troops who were sacrificed at the altar of the US Terror War. It calls on all PNP officers and troops to speak up and stand against the Aquino regime and its police officials who ordered the Mamasapano operation and expose continuing US military interventionism in the Philippines," the Communist Party said condemning the Aquino government including the United States which the party claims to be involved in the incident. The Communist Party reiterated its call to abolish the Enhanced Defense Cooperation Agreement, the Visiting Forces Agreement, and the Mutual Defense Treaty.

=== Business sector ===
Some foreign investors withdrew from investing in the country following the incident. A group of Jordanian businessmen willing to invest on a banana plantation left abruptly once they arrived on February 1 after hearing about the incident. Malaysian businessmen looking for sites in Cotabato City cancelled their trip while a group of Malaysians and Singaporeans who are seeking to replicate their mini mall business halted their investment.

=== International ===
United Nations – The United Nations team in the Philippines expressed its condolences to the families of the 44 fallen members of the Special Action Force of the Philippine National Police. The team also welcomed the investigation on the incident initiated both by the Philippine government and the Moro Islamic Liberation Front (MILF). "We welcome the conduct of investigations by the Government and the Moro Islamic Liberation Front (MILF) into the incident, and the commitments expressed by President Benigno S. Aquino III, MILF Chairman Ebrahim Murad, and other concerned parties in regard to sustaining focus on the peace process," the UN said in a statement, expressing its willingness to help in the ongoing peace process by releasing resources to support the process.

European Union – European Union Ambassador Guy Ledoux expressed condolence to the families of the slain policemen and acknowledged that the Mamasapano incident "shows that peace is fragile, and it is regrettable that in spite of all the efforts this sort of violence still happens." and also expressed hopes that the incident will not affect the peace process in Mindanao. At the same time, the EU envoy said the doubts raised by some quarters about the viability of the peace agreement between the government and Moro Islamic Liberation Front, including lawmakers' suspension of discussions on the proposed Bangsamoro Basic Law, was understandable.

Australia – In a joint statement with Spain, Australia said through its Ambassador to the Philippines Bill Tweddel, stated that his government hoped that the incident will not derail the peace process. "I think the only sensible thing I can say, when we are all trying to find out what exactly happened and why, is that how important it is for the people of the Philippines, including Mindanao, that the peace process is not discarded as a result of this tragedy and we are just hoping that that could be the case," Tweddel said. The ambassador describes the event as a "very sad development for those of us who care to see peace in the Philippines."

Canada – Canadian Ambassador to the Philippines Neil Reeder said his government is saddened by the bloody encounter in Mamasapano, Maguindanao between the PNP-Special Action Force and Moro Islamic Liberation Front which left at least 44 government forces dead. "It is very sad to see this happen. All of us share the grief of the government and the Filipino people on what transpired," he told reporters at a media reception. "There were so many casualties and wounded, particularly the Philippine National Police, who were in that situation," he added. He also expressed hopes the incident will not complicate the peace process in Mindanao as some lawmakers, tasked to approve a draft law that will create a new autonomous region in Mindanao following the signing of the peace deal with the MILF, have signified their opposition to it after the incident. He also added that the Canadian government is awaiting further clarifications on what really happened in Maguindanao.

Spain – In a joint statement with Australia, Spain stated that it "trusts there will be a quick investigation into the facts and the consequent accountability so that the search for solid and long-lasting peace in Mindanao can be resumed with the most extensive consensus possible,".

Turkey – The Turkish Ministry of Foreign Affairs expressed concern for the incident and hope that the incident would not affect the peace process in Mindanao. The ministry also expressed regrets to the loss and life and offered condolence to the families and relatives to the victims of the clash.

United States – US Ambassador Philip Goldberg hailed the bravery of the slain police commandos. “My thoughts, condolences to families and friends and colleagues of brave members of the Special Action Force who lost their lives this week,” Goldberg said in his Twitter account.

On January 30, 2015, the US Embassy released an official statement expressing its "heartfelt condolences to the families, friends, and colleagues" of the slain SAF policemen. "The SAF units fought with bravery and demonstrated their commitment to ensuring peace and order in their country," it said. The embassy added that the USA reiterated its support for the Philippine government's efforts to fight international terrorism while promoting a "just and lasting peaceful resolution" to the Mindanao conflict.

US Embassy Press Attache Kurt Hoyer denied allegations of any US involvement in the clash after US troops in civilian clothes were seen Monday assisting in the airlifting of the wounded. Hoyer told MindaNews in a text message Tuesday morning (January 27, 2015) that "at the request of the Armed Forces of the Philippines, US service members serving in JSOTF-P (Joint Special Operations Task Force-Philippines) responded to assist in the evacuation of dead and wounded after the firefight in Maguindanao." He also said he will ask the Philippine National Police for the details of the operations.

United Kingdom – A Twitter post dated January 25 from the Minister of State for the Foreign and Commonwealth Office Hugo Swire was forwarded by the UK Ambassador to the Philippines Asif Ahmad, saying: "Grim news of PNP officers killed in action in Maguindanao. Our thoughts are with the families of the men who died doing their duty."

==== Other reactions abroad ====
A sympathy walk for the 44 fallen PNP-SAF commandos was held in Metro Manila on January 30, 2015. It was attended by alumni of the PNP, local police and various supporters, and four members of the Chicago Police Department.

The International Monitoring Team which oversees the implementation of ceasefire between government and the (MILF), said it will start its own investigation in regards to the incident. Malaysian Gen. Yaakub Samad, IMT head, said the IMT board of inquiry will start its investigation on February 7 “to determine the real circumstances that led to the SAF-MILF encounter".

After the confirmation of the killing of Abdhir, the FBI reportedly congratulated the SAF.

== Labeling of the incident ==
There is some debate regarding on what to call the incident in Mamasapano a "misencounter" or a massacre. The Senate labels the conflict as a massacre due to the manner the 44 SAF personnel were killed while the Commission on Human Rights (CHR) insists that the incident was a misencounter and not a massacre. "The Mamasapano incident was overkill. Labeling the tragedy as a misencounter would do injustice to the fallen 44 PNP-SAF heroes", the Senate report describes the Mamasapano incident.

CHR, led by Loretta Rosales, insists that the incident was a "misencounter" and not a massacre since the MILF and SAF forces never intended to fight each other. Rosales says that the SAF troops were armed and not helpless. MILF chief peace negotiator Mohaquer Iqbal earlier described the incident as a "misencounter" insisting the clash was not planned by MILF and government forces.

Senator Chiz Escudero asserts that while he respects Rosales' opinion regarding the labeling of the incident, he said that the Senate's report describing the incident as a massacre is supported by evidences, testimonies and documents. Senator Grace Poe echoed Escudero's reasonings. Some Senators also criticized the CHR's stand. Escudero questioned the CHR if the human rights body does not cover the human rights of military and police personnel. Senator JV Ejercito calls the human rights body to also protect the rights of government security forces and not only those of activists and media people. Senator and Acting Senate Minority leader, Vicente Sotto III criticized the human rights body on what he views as meddling and suggest the CHR to make their own report on the incident.

== In popular culture ==
The story of two of the 44 members of the special forces killed in Mamasapano was narrated in two special episodes of the anthology series Maalaala Mo Kaya. The first episode dealt the life of Police Chief Inspector John Garry Erana, starring Coco Martin (which became the motivational subject to act his role in Ang Probinsyano), while the latter told the story of Police Senior Inspector Rennie Tayrus starring Ejay Falcon.

The story of PO3 John Lloyd Sumbilla was narrated in an episode of Wish Ko Lang starring Alden Richards, while the stories of Ephraim Meija and Nicky DC Nacino were narrated in separate episodes of Magpakailanman starring Dennis Trillo and Rocco Nacino respectively. The opening sequence of London Has Fallen briefly mentions "a national day of mourning in the Philippines, after 44 police commandos were killed in the line of duty when an anti-terror operation went wrong", making it look like the antagonist of the film had links to the incident.

Two feature films based on the incident have been produced, with one already released. Mamasapano: Now It Can Be Told, directed by Lawrence Fajardo and starring Edu Manzano, Juan Rodrigo, Gerald Santos, Kuya Manzano and Rez Cortez, was released on Christmas Day of 2022. An upcoming film, Motherland, directed by Brillante Mendoza, will premiere at the 28th Busan International Film Festival in October 2024. A third film, Oplan Exodus: SAF 44 – For God and Country, produced by and starring E.R. Ejercito and directed by Enzo Williams, was slated for release in December 2021 but is currently in development hell.
