= Officer in charge (Philippines) =

Official serving in an interim role

The position of officer in charge (OIC), also spelled officer-in-charge, in the context of Philippine governance refers to an official who serves in a government office on an interim or temporary basis, usually as the caretaker or custodian of the office pending the appointment or assumption of a permanent officeholder. The position is distinct from that of an official serving in an acting capacity.

== National government ==
=== Philippine National Police ===
In the Philippine National Police (PNP), an officer in charge differs from an acting official in the manner by which the position is assumed. An OIC temporarily assumes command because the incumbent is unable to perform the duties of the office, whereas an acting official is formally designated by the appropriate appointing authority.

In December 2014, Deputy Chief for Operations Leonardo Espina became OIC of the PNP after Director General Alan Purisima was suspended, while Deputy Chief for Administration Felipe Rojas had already retired.

In October 2019, when Oscar Albayalde went on non-duty status amid a controversy, Deputy Chief for Administration Archie Gamboa assumed the post of OIC of the PNP. Non-duty status is comparable to terminal leave in the civil service. Although Albayalde relinquished command of the PNP, he remained a member of the police force until reaching the mandatory retirement age of 56 on November 8, 2019. During this period, he retained the rank of Police General, preventing his successor from holding the same rank until his retirement.

On May 8, 2022, one day before the 2022 Philippine general election, Dionardo Carlos retired upon reaching the mandatory retirement age. Deputy Chief for Operations Vicente Danao was designated by President Rodrigo Duterte as OIC of the PNP until President Bongbong Marcos appointed Rodolfo Azurin Jr. as chief.

On August 26, 2025, Nicolas Torre was relieved as chief, PNP upon the directive of President Marcos through Executive Secretary Lucas Bersamin. Jose Melencio Nartatez, then commander of the Area Police Command – Western Mindanao, was designated as OIC of the PNP.

=== Office of the President ===
During the administrations of Presidents Gloria Macapagal Arroyo, Benigno Aquino III, and Rodrigo Duterte, the executive secretary was frequently designated as officer in charge of the Office of the President whenever the President was on an official state or working visit abroad, while the vice president continued to perform the functions of the vice presidency.

During the administration of President Bongbong Marcos, it was initially speculated that Vice President Sara Duterte would be designated as OIC whenever the president travelled abroad. Instead, the responsibility has generally been delegated to the executive secretary or, on some occasions, to Cabinet secretaries.

== Local government ==
Under the implementing rules and regulations of the Local Government Code of 1991, a local chief executive (i.e. the governor of a province, the mayor of a city or municipality, or the barangay captain) may designate an officer in charge (OIC) whenever they travel outside their jurisdiction but remain within the Philippines for a period not exceeding three consecutive days. The designation must be made in writing and specify the duties to be performed by the OIC. However, the OIC may not exercise the powers to appoint, dismiss, or suspend government employees, as the position is limited to administrative functions and excludes discretionary powers.

By contrast, an official serves in an acting capacity when the local chief executive is temporarily unable to perform the functions of office because of a leave of absence, travel outside the Philippines, or physical or legal incapacity. In such cases, the vice governor, vice mayor, or the highest-ranking member of the Sangguniang Barangay, as applicable, automatically assumes the office in an acting capacity. An acting local chief executive may exercise the powers to appoint, dismiss, or suspend government employees only after serving in that capacity for at least 30 working days.
