= Nicanor Bartolome =

Retired police general

Retired P/DIR-GEN Nicanor Bartolome

Chief of the Philippine National Police
- In office September 9, 2011 – December 17, 2012
- Preceded by: P/DDir. Gen. Raul Bacalzo
- Succeeded by: P/Dir. Gen. Alan Purisima

Personal details
- Born: Nicanor A. Bartolome; March 16, 1957 (age 69) Gerona, Tarlac
- Education: Philippine Military Academy
- Police career
- Service: Philippine National Police
- Allegiance: Philippines
- Divisions: Office of the Chief of Directorial Staff; National Capital Region Police Office; PNP Region IV-A (CALABARZON PRO); Tarlac Police Provincial Office; PNP Public Information Office (PIO)
- Service years: 1981–2012
- Rank: Police Director General

Nicanor A. Bartolome (born March 16, 1957) is a Filipino retired police officer who served as the chief of the Philippine National Police.

== Police career ==
=== Early days ===
A Tarlaqueño, Bartolome is a member of Philippine Military Academy in 1981. One of his notable early post was being provincial director of Tarlac Police Provincial Office.

=== Superintendent to general officer ===
He is also served as PIO chief or spokesman of PNP in 2007 until Director General Avelino Razon until 2008 under General Jesus Versoza. He also served as regional director of CALABARZON police (PRO 4-A).

In 2011, he became the regional director of National Capital Region Police Office (NCRPO). He was later appointed as PNP's directorial staff.

=== PNP Chief ===
On September 9, 2011, Bartolome was appointed as PNP Chief replacing General Raul Bacalzo. He was intendent to retire in 2013 but his term cut short and turn into floating status, in order to promote and appoint General Alan Purisima as the chief. Bartolome retired on December 18, 2012.
