= Leonardo Espina =

Retired police general

Retired Police Deputy Director General Leonardo A. Espina

Chief of the Philippine National Police
- Officer-In-Charge / Acting
- In office February 5 – June 16, 2015
- President: Benigno Aquino III
- Preceded by: PDGen. Alan Purisima
- Succeeded by: PDGen. Ricardo Marquez

Personal details
- Born: Leonardo A. Espina; July 19, 1959 (age 67) Philippines
- Education: Philippine Military Academy
- Police career
- Service: Philippine National Police
- Allegiance: Philippines
- Divisions: PNP Directoral Staff; National Capital Region Police Office; Highway Patrol Group; Spokesperson, PNP
- Service years: 1981–2015
- Rank: Police Deputy Director General

Leonardo A. Espina is a Filipino former police officer who formerly served as Officer-in-Charge and acting chief of the Philippine National Police.

== Police career ==
Espina graduated from the Philippine Military Academy in 1981, and joined the Philippine Constabulary.

He was assigned as the spokesman of the Philippine National Police in 2002, in the time of PNP chief General Hermogenes Ebdane, and in 2009 to 2010, in the time of PNP chief General Jesus Verzosa. He was assigned to be the director of the Highway Patrol Group in 2010 to 2012.

In September 6, 2012, he was assigned as the chief director of the National Capital Region Police Office. Anti-kotong efforts were launched, but his son was later a victim of the corrupt police's kotong scheme.

After stint with the Metro Manila's police force, In July 11, 2013, Espina was appointed to be the chief of the Directorial Staff of the PNP. When the then-suspended PNP chief General Alan Purisima resigned, Espina was assigned as Officer-in-Charge of the Philippine National Police (because Purisima did not retire).

In his service as Officer-in-Charge of the Philippine National Police, he led the efforts to give justice to the fallen 44 Special Action Force officers. He did not get the highest position, and retired as an OIC. Espina retired from service on July 19, 2015. He was honored with a parade at the Philippine Military Academy (PMA) for his leadership. Espina was awarded the Presidential Legion of Honor by President Benigno Aquino III. He was replaced by Ricardo Marquez.

== Post police service ==
During the 2016 Senate investigation, Kerwin Espinosa pointed to Espina’s brother-in-law, Victor Espina (they incidentally have the same surnames) as to have sold him firearms. Espinosa further stated that he doesn’t know General Espina. Victor Espina also executed an affidavit that he did it on his own without the knowledge of General Espina.

Espina enjoys an active family life complete with 7 dogs.
