= Oplan Exodus: SAF 44 – For God and Country =

2021 war film starring E.R. Ejercito

Oplan Exodus: SAF 44 (For God and Country)
- Directed by: Enzo Williams
- Starring: Jeorge "E.R." Estregan
- Production companies: Brownfont Productions; Jeorge "E.R." Estregan Productions
- Country: Philippines
- Language: Filipino

Oplan Exodus: SAF 44 (For God and Country) is an upcoming Filipino action drama film based around the titular ill-fated police operation in Mamasapano, Maguindanao. The film will be directed by Enzo Williams and produced by Jeorge "E.R." Estregan, who will also star in the lead role.

The film was first announced by Estregan through his Facebook page on February 16, 2015, with a poster revealing Pedring Lopez as director alongside the involvement of Scenema Concept International and Viva Films. The announcement, occurring less than a month after Oplan Exodus, generated controversy for its perceived insensitivity toward the recent tragedy; former president Joseph Estrada, Estregan's uncle, called the project "a waste of money and time" and warned that it would mean "suicide" for the actor's career in film and politics.

After the announcement, the project languished in development hell over the next six years, with Estregan occasionally attempting to revive the film throughout that time. In 2019, Estregan claimed that he was in talks with Netflix for the film's online distribution after a theatrical release. By May 2021, Estregan renewed plans for the film's production, and revealed through Facebook the film's new title, director, and production companies (Brownfont Productions and Jeorge "E.R." Estregan Productions).

== Cast ==
- Jeorge "E.R." Estregan

== Production ==
The film was announced on February 16, 2015, by E.R. Ejercito through his Facebook page, wherein he posted a draft poster for his upcoming film about the Mamasapano clash, SAF: Special Action Force, with him in the lead role under the screen name Jeorge "E.R." Estregan. The poster also revealed the involvement of director Pedring Lopez and the production companies Scenema Concept International and Viva Films, the latter two being the studios that produced his four most recent action films including Manila Kingpin and Muslim Magnum .357. Estregan stated that he aims for the film to "immortalize the sacrifice that the heroes of the elite Philippine National Police-SAF made for the country." The announcement was criticized by former president Joseph Estrada, Estregan's uncle, who warned that the film could heighten tensions and "generate animosity" and thus would be "a waste of money and time." He also cautioned Estregan that making the film would mean "suicide" for his career in film and politics.

Subsequent to the announcement, the project languished in development hell over the next six years, with Estregan only sporadically reaffirming production plans throughout that time. In January 2017, the film was renamed SAF 44: Mamasapano, with his children Eric Ejercito, Jerico Estregan and Jet Ejercito apparently included in the cast. By September 2017, the film was further retitled as SAF 44: The Mamasapano Board Inquiry Report. In April 2019, Estregan claimed that he was in talks with Netflix for the film's online distribution after its theatrical release, with the film now renamed SAF: Para sa Diyos, para sa Bayan, para sa Tao, and reasserted the involvement of Lopez as director; he had hoped that the film would be released within the year.

On May 13, 2021, Ejercito released a new poster for the film, revealing the film's new title (SAF 44: For God and Country), director (Enzo Williams) and production companies (Brownfont Productions and Jeorge "E.R." Estregan Productions). By May 28, the title was altered further to become Oplan Exodus: SAF 44 (For God and Country).

The film was previously slated for release on December 25, 2021, a date reserved for entries to the Metro Manila Film Festival.

== Controversy ==
Upon its announcement on February 16, 2015, less than a month after Oplan Exodus and the Mamasapano clash, the project was promptly met with controversy, with negative reactions concerning the insensitive timing of the project and Estregan's perceived tasteless attitude toward the tragic incident. In addition to Estrada's critical comments on the announcement, Albay Governor Joey Salceda shared his concern that the families of the soldiers who died might not have been consulted on the film project, stating that they "should promptly organize and hire a lawyer. The story belongs to them."

Eugenio Villareal, chairman of the Movie and Television Review and Classification Board (MTRCB), explained that "For such a delicate theme, a good deal of prudence is required." Police chief superintendent Generoso Cerbo Jr., spokesperson for the Philippine National Police, expressed that the story of the soldiers in the incident should be told from the proper perspective, which he noted would be difficult as the establishing and gathering of facts about the Mamasapano clash was still ongoing at the time.
