= Philipp Jordan =

German artist and grew up in Karlsruhe (born 1974)

- Born: 1974 (age 51–52); Bonn
- Education: Freie Kunstschule in Stuttgart
- Notable work: 1000 teddies

Philipp Jordan (born 1974 in Bonn) is a German artist and grew up in Karlsruhe. Before he created his 1000 teddies project, which he is now mostly known for, he was a Graffiti artist in the early 1990s.

== Life ==
From 1998 to 2000 he studied at the Freie Kunstschule in Stuttgart Graphic Design. Then he moved to Freiburg, where he continued his studies in graphic design at the free university for graphic design and visual arts. In 2003 he moved to The Netherlands and studied illustration at the Hogeschool voor de art, an art academy in Utrecht.

1989 to 1995 he was an active part of the Graffiti scene.

Philipp Jordan is married. He lives and works in Utrecht.

== Works ==
Philipp Jordan's origins were graffiti and comics. He finds the main source of inspiration is childhood as a fictional place. For his work he frequently uses Oilbar and spray paint. Currently, the project 1000 Teddies with exhibitions in Vienna, Düsseldorf, Hamburg, Los Angeles, San Diego and Utrecht (Netherlands), is the most famous project of Philipp Jordan. Philipp Jordan returns from time to time to his comic book roots and designs booklets as a comic.. His work is often signed Teddies in Space.

Mural in Utrecht by Teddies in Space

Teddies in space art on street cabinets in Utrecht

== Projects ==
- Teddies!, Bienale Liverpool 2010
- 1000 Teddies, installation
- Knock On Wood, wood painting series
- Beauty of the Beast, exhibition series
- Various murals in Utrecht
