= Raul Bacalzo =

Retired police general

Chief of the Philippine National Police
- In office September 14, 2010 – September 9, 2011
- Preceded by: Jesus Verzosa
- Succeeded by: Nicanor Bartolome

Personal details
- Born: Raul M. Bacalzo; September 15, 1955 (age 70) Philippines
- Education: Philippine Military Academy
- Police career
- Service: Philippine National Police
- Allegiance: Philippines
- Divisions: Office of the Deputy Chief for Operations
- Service years: 1977–2011
- Rank: Police Director General

Raul M. Bacalzo (born September 15, 1955) is a Filipino lawyer and retired police officer who served as the chief of the Philippine National Police.

== Career ==
As a member of the class 1977 of the Philippine Military Academy, Bacalzo is known for his crime investigation specialties. He is also a lawyer who placed 12th in the 1984 Bar Exam.

He was appointed on September 14, 2010, as PNP chief, replacing General Jesus Verzosa. During his tenure, he said that the implementation of death penalty would not be a good idea.

But he choose to retire early on September 9, 2011, and replaced by DDG Nicanor Bartolome, the Directorial Staff chief or PNP's No. 4 official. After that, he was a named candidate to replace Ret. General Magtanggol Gatdula as NBI Director.

=== Jueteng controversy ===
Sandra Cam, a Jueteng whistleblower pointed out that Bacalzo who gave a speech to fight jueteng in the appointment day as PNP chief, is a jueteng coddler. Bacalzo denied these accusations.
