= Abdul Basit Usman =

Filipino Islamic terrorist (1974–2015)

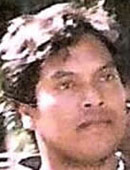
- Born: Ahmad Akmad Batabol Usman; 1974; Shariff Aguak, Maguindanao del Sur, Philippines
- Died: 3 May 2015 (aged 40–41); Guindulungan, Maguindanao del Sur, Philippines
- Other names: List: Usman; Basit; Basit Usman

Ahmad Akmad Batabol Usman (1974 – 3 May 2015), more commonly known as Abdul Basit Usman, was a Filipino terrorist and a bomb-making expert who led the Special Operations Group of the Bangsamoro Islamic Freedom Fighters and had links to the Abu Sayyaf and Jemaah Islamiyah militant groups. Usman was on the United States' Rewards for Justice Program list, which offered $1 million for his capture.

== Early life ==
Usman was born in 1974 in Labo-Labo, a village in Shariff Aguak, Maguindanao del Sur in the southern Philippines. He worked as an overseas Filipino in Pakistan before engaging in militant activities.

== Militant activity ==
Usman was implicated in the FitMart Mall bombing in General Santos on 21 April 2002, which killed at least 15 people and injured 55 others. Several weeks later, he was arrested and accused of assembling the bomb. He was interrogated and imprisoned at the Sarangani Provincial Police Station, but was made a minimum-security detainee for good behavior. His cell was not locked, and he escaped in October 2002.

Upon his escape, Usman joined Tahir Alonto, a former commander of the Moro Islamic Liberation Front whom the military had accused of leading the Pentagon gang, a kidnap-for-ransom group. Usman later offered to turn himself in. Senior Inspector Aucelito Cabang, who was Usman's custodial officer, entered Alonto's territory with three other officers to arrest Usman, but was killed in what turned out to be a trap.

Usman would later be linked to a bombing at the public market of Tacurong on 10 October 2006, which injured four people, and to the Cotabato City bombings on 5 and 7 January 2007, which killed two people and injured three others.

On 14 January 2010, Usman was incorrectly reported to have been killed along with several others in an American drone strike in Pakistan that targeted the Pakistani Taliban leader, Hakimullah Mehsud. Later, he was also reported to have been killed in a series of military shellings in Maguindanao del Sur.

Usman later resurfaced, and in June 2014, government officials warned that he was planning a bombing in Davao City. On 25 January 2015, he was one of two targets in the Mamasapano clash in Mindanao. His companion Zulkifli Abdhir, the other target, was killed in the raid, but Usman escaped and fled into the Liguasan Marsh. The military and the Moro Islamic Liberation Front launched offensives to find and capture him, with President Aquino vowing, "We will get Usman."

== Death ==
Usman was killed in an encounter with the Moro Islamic Liberation Front on 3 May 2015 in Guindulungan, Maguindanao del Sur. It was suspected that one of his bodyguards killed him in order to collect the $1 million bounty on his head. According to a statement from the Armed Forces of the Philippines, "There was in-fighting among his bodyguards. When he was killed, he had 7 bodyguards — but these bodyguards were not the most loyal to him."

However, the Armed Forces of the Philippines later backtracked on that claim and confirmed that Usman was killed by the Moro Islamic Liberation Front.
