= Katibah Nusantara =

Katibah Nusantara or KN (Jawi: كتيبه نوسنتارا, transl. Archipelago Battalion / Nusantara Battalion), also known as Katibah Nusantara Lid Daulah Islamiyyah, Malay archipelago unit for the Islamic State in Iraq and Syria and Majmu'ah al Arkhabiliy, was a Southeast Asian Jihadist Militant organization part of the Islamic State (IS), composed of Malay-speaking individuals, mostly from Indonesia and Malaysia, but also from the Philippines and Singapore. They received international attention for being the perpetrators of the 2016 Jakarta attacks. It was made up of about 30 small cells.

It was listed as terror organisation by Malaysia.

== History ==
Katibah Nusantara was formally launched on 26 September 2014, headquartered in Al-Shaddadi, in the Syrian province of Hasakah. Its training ground was located in Poso, Indonesia. In early April 2015, the unit achieved its first major combat success by capturing five Kurdish-held territories in Syria, speculating that the unit's main area of operations was still in Syria, before the 2016 Jakarta attacks.

== Leadership ==
The unit's first known Amir, or leader, is Abu Ibrahim al-Indunisiy. In 2016, it was alleged that either Bahrun Naim, mastermind of the 2016 Jakarta attacks, or Bahrum Syah, known by his nom de guerre Abu Muhammad al Indonesi, took over leadership until the groups demise.
