= Kumpulan Mujahidin Malaysia =

1990s–2014 Malaysian Islamist militant organisation

- Leaders: Zulkifli Abdhir †; Zainuri Kamaruddin †
- Dates active: 1990s-2014
- Headquarters: Malaysia
- Active regions: Southeast Asia
- Ideology: Islamic fundamentalism Islamic state Islamism; Jihadism; Pan-Islamism
- Size: 70–200
- Part of: Jemaah Islamiyah
- Wars: War on Terror

The Kumpulan Mujahidin Malaysia (KMM), or Malaysian Mujahideen Movement, is/was a terrorist organisation that supported an overthrow of the government led by Mahathir Mohamad and is/was for the creation of a pan-regional Islamic state comprising southern Thailand, the entirety of Indonesia, and the southern Philippines. It is believed to be self-financing and is often tied in correlation to smaller more extremist groups in Southeast Asia. The KMM is often cited as being associated with the Jemaah Islamiyah or JI. The Malaysian government, which is actively fighting against the Malaysian Mujahideen Movement, has arrested anywhere from 70 to 80 terrorists. The government currently has 48 members in total detained.

According to Thai military authorities, Kumpulan Mujahidin Malaysia is behind the revival of Gerakan Mujahidin Islam Patani (GMIP) and the Barisan Revolusi Nasional (BRN), groups that now have more hard-line Islamic political goals.

An October 2014 report by the Malay Mail recently claimed that the KMM is currently no longer active.

== See also ==
- Jemaah Islamiyah
- Zulkifli Abdhir
