= Alan Purisima =

Filipino retired police officer (born 1959)

Alan LM Purisima
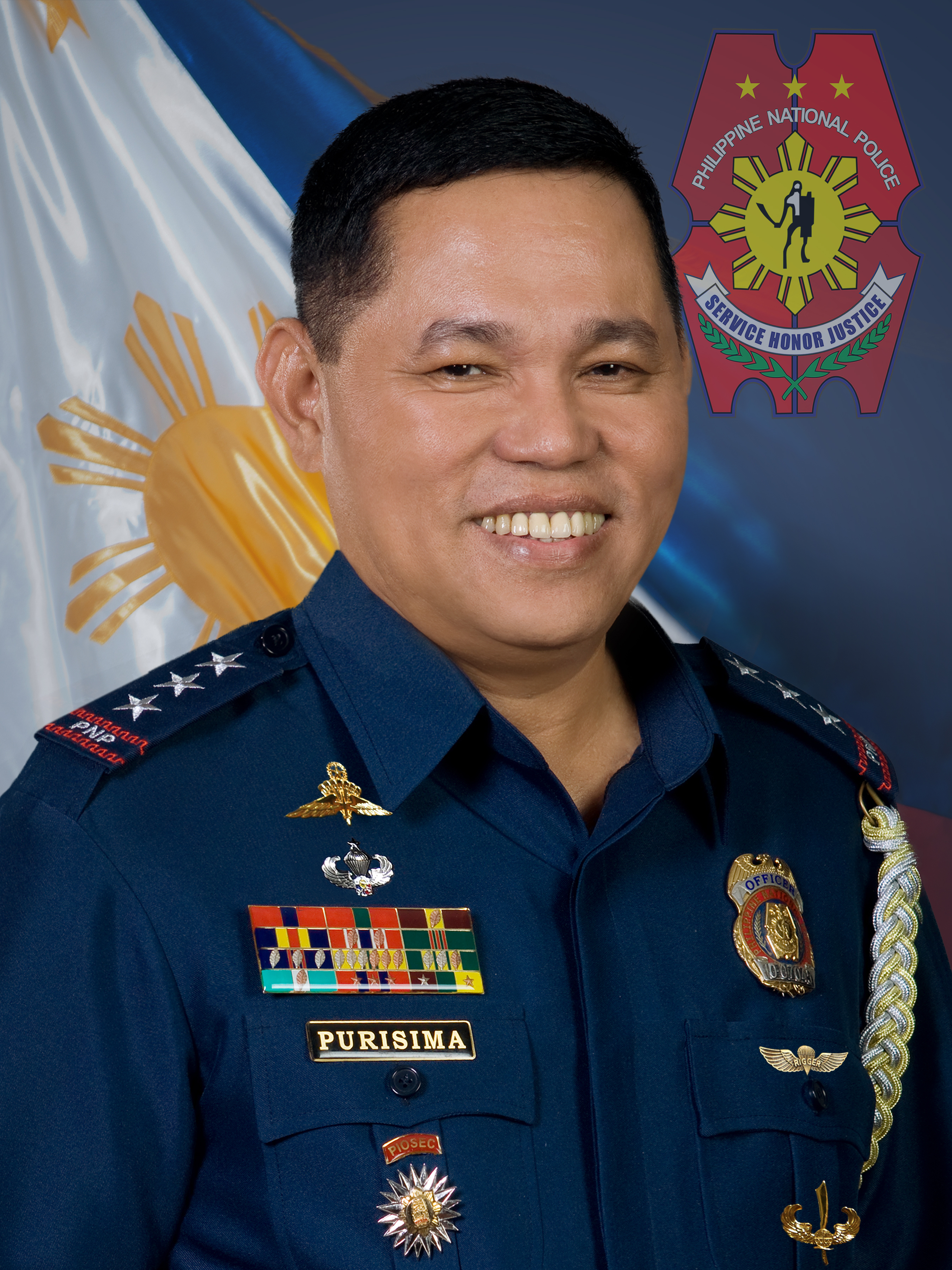

Chief of the Philippine National Police
- In office December 17, 2012 – February 5, 2015
- President: Benigno Aquino III
- Preceded by: PDG Nicanor Bartolome
- Succeeded by: PDDG Leonardo Espina (OIC / Acting)

Personal details
- Born: Alan La Madrid Purisima; November 21, 1959 (age 66) San Ildefenso, Ilocos Sur, Philippines
- Spouse: Maria Ramona Lydia Isidoro Purisima
- Education: Philippine Military Academy; Manuel L. Quezon University
- Police career
- Service: Philippine National Police
- Allegiance: Philippines
- Divisions: National Capital Region Police Office; Police Regional Office 3 (PRO-3); Directorate for Investigation and Detective Management; Civil Security Group; Pangasinan Provincial Police; WPD - Police Investigation Unit
- Service years: 1981–2015
- Rank: Police Director General

Alan La Madrid Purisima (born November 21, 1959) is a former Filipino police officer. He served as Philippine National Police Chief between December 17, 2012 and February 5, 2015.

== Early life ==
Purisima grew up in San Ildefonso, Ilocos Sur.

He was the executive officer of the Special Reaction Unit from 1988–1989.

== Education ==
After finishing high school, Purisima entered the Philippine Military Academy in 1977 and graduated from the academy in 1981. After his graduation from military academy he joined the Philippine Constabulary. He graduated from the Manuel L. Quezon University in 1995. He earned a Masters of Public Administration degree from the university.

== Police career ==
When he was serving at the Constabulary, which was part of the military, he was assigned to Presidential Security Group (PSG) that guarded then-President Corazon Aquino’s family during the military coup attempts on her administration, serving the PSG as one of its intelligence officers in 1987 and commanding its Special Reaction Unit from 1988 to 1989.

He also became a police intelligence officer in Pangasinan and leader of the District Police Investigation Unit of Western Police District. In 2002, he served as the chief of Police Anti-Crime and Emergency Response (Pacer), and served as the head of the National Anti-Kidnapping Task Force (Naktaf) Strike Force/Pacer from 2003 to 2005. He also served as provincial director of Pangasinan, Camp Crame's Task Force Anti-Private Armed Groups commander, Civil Security Group's chief directorial staff, deputy director of the Directorate for Investigation and Detective Management, and Central Luzon Regional Police Office (PRO-3).

He was appointed as the regional head of the National Capital Region Police Office (NCRPO) May 11, 2011, replacing Director Nicanor Bartolome. He was later replaced by Leonardo Espina in 2012 after being appointed as the Chief of the Directorial Staff. He assumed the position of PNP Chief in December 17, 2012, after Bartolome stepped down. He was suspended in December 4, 2014 due to corruption scandal. He was sacked in February 5, 2015 but did not retired, and he was replaced by Leonardo Espina in OIC basis.

== Controversies ==
=== Mamasapano negligence ===
Even he was suspended in 2014, according to President Benigno Aquino III's admission, he knew personally the whole operations of killing Zulkifli Abdhir aka Marwan, and both DILG Secretary Mar Roxas, and Deputy Chief Leonardo Espina were not notified of it. Before of that statement, an article published earlier by Manila Standard Today claimed that Purisima not only knew of the operation, but even took control of the operations despite being suspended from duty. Also, there's a claim that the operation was a directive from the United States which "even offered a $5-million bounty for Marwan's capture" with the silence of Aquino about the former's role.

=== Corruption scandals ===
He was suspended in December 4, 2014 due to a corruption scandal involving three generals and other 11 officers due to an anomalous alleged misuse of gun owners’ courier fees. He was acquitted on charges relating to the incident by the Sandiganbayan in 2025.

On June 30, 2015, he was dismissed from service by the Office of the Ombudsman over the alleged involvement in a ₱100-million anomalous deal between the Philippine National Police and WerFast Documentary Agency, Inc, a private courier company.

== Personal life ==
Alan Purisima is married to Maria Ramona Lydia Isidoro Purisima, with whom he has four sons.
