= Zulkifli Abdhir =

Malaysian Islamist (1966–2015)

- Born: Zulkifli Abdhir; 1966; Muar, Johor, Malaysia
- Died: 25 January 2015 (aged 48–49); Mamasapano, Maguindanao del Sur, Philippines
- Cause of death: Gunshot wounds
- Resting place: Presumed around the village of Tukanalipao
- Other names: show all (30): Marwan; Zulkifli bin Hir; Zulkifli bin Abdul Hir; Zulkifli Abd Hir; Hulagu; Holagu; Lagu; Musa Abdul Hir; Zulkifli Abdul Hir; Zulkifli Abdul Khir; Abdul Hir Zulkifli; Abduhir Bin Hir; Bin Abdul Hir Zulkifli; Zulkifli; Zulkifli Hir; Musa, Abdulhir Bin Hir; Ahmad Shobirin; Armand Escalante; Hassan; Hendri Lawi; Henri Lawi; Hogalu; Hugalu; Muslimin Abdulmotalib; Norhana Mohamad; Normina, Hashim; Omar Salem; Salim Alombra
- Occupations: Leader of the Kumpulan Mujahidin Malaysia, part of the central command of the Jemaah Islamiyah, Telecommunications engineer
- Known for: One of the FBI's Most Wanted Terrorists
- Height: 1.68 m (5 ft 6 in)
- Spouse: 3
- Children: 2-3
- Allegiance: (Islamic State) Abu Sayyaf; Bangsamoro Islamic Freedom Fighters; Kumpulan Mujahidin Malaysia (leader); Jemaah Islamiyah (Islamic State) Khalifa Islamiyah Mindanao (co-founder); Moro Islamic Liberation Front (alleged)
- Motive: Islamism
- Reward amount: US$5,000,000
- Capture status: Dead
- Wanted by: Indonesia; Malaysia; Philippines; United States
- Accomplices: show all (23): Rahmat Abdhir; Azahari Husin; Noordin Mohammad Top; Aljebir Adzhar; Muhamda Ali; Dulmatin; Fathur Rohman al-Ghozi; Umbra Jumdail Gumbahali; Ren-Ren Dongon; Zainab Dongon; Maria Halimm; Umar Patek; Jaida; Khadaffy Janjalani; Ameril Umbra Kato; Mohamad Amin Musa; Mohammad Sabil; Pahmiya Sabil; Jainal Antel Sali; Esmail Solaiman; Yazid Sufaat; Abu Tariq; Abdul Basit Usman
- Wanted since: 2000, August 2003
- Time at large: 23 years

Details
- Victims: Multiple bombing incidents of which his involvement is highly suspected.
- Span of crimes: 2000 – 2015 †
- Country: Indonesia, Malaysia, Philippines
- Targets: Civilians, government officials
- Weapons: Suicide bombs, IEDs

Zulkifli Abdhir (1966 – 25 January 2015) was a Malaysian who was one of the FBI Most Wanted Terrorists. The American Federal Bureau of Investigation (FBI) agency offered a US$5 million reward for information leading to his capture. He was the maker of bombs delivered for usage to several terrorist groups. He was often referred to by the nom de guerre Marwan. He was suspected of leading the Kumpulan Mujahidin Malaysia (KMM), being part of the central command of the Jemaah Islamiyah (JI), and of involvement in the 2002 Bali bombings. He was suspected of hiding in Mindanao under the protection of the Bangsamoro Islamic Freedom Fighters.

Zulkifli was killed on 25 January 2015 by Philippine Special Action Force (SAF) officers during the raid that culminated in the Mamasapano clash.

== Early life ==
Zulkifli was born in 1966 in Muar, Johor, Malaysia. According to the FBI, he was 5 feet 6 inches tall, approximately 120 pounds, and could speak Malay, Tagalog, English, and Arabic. Zulkifli attended a boarding school in Malaysia until he trained overseas as an engineer in the USA. After his training, he abruptly left his 10 siblings and 3 children to join up with terrorist activities.

I remember him saying that he wanted to secure a good job and provide for the family. He used to take me sightseeing regularly and helped me with the household expenses. Then he was gone.

— Mother of Zulkifli recalling his departure.

== Terrorism ==
Zulkifli, often going under the nom de guerre "Marwan", was suspected to be in charge of the South Eastern Asian and Indonesian terrorist group called the Kumpulan Mujahidin Malaysia (KMM). The KMM is/was a part of the international terrorist organisation, Jemaah Islamiyah (JI), of which Zulkifli was believed to be part of its central command. The JI is the main cause of the devastating 2002 Bali bombings and many other attacks in South Eastern Asia of which Zulkifli's involvement in is also suspected. Abdhir also co-founded the terrorist group Khalifa Islamiyah Mindanao. He was initially wanted by the Malaysian government for the killing of a Christian member of their Parliament in 2000, which was an attack that was backed by Al-Qaeda.

Zulkifli was wanted for the allegation of being a supplier of bombs to various terrorist groups around the world. He was also under suspicion of teaching terrorists how to create bombs. Zulkifli, himself, was taught to make IEDs by the terrorist Azahari Husin. He was involved in the building of bombs for the Abu Sayyaf terrorist group, which brought him into brief collaborations with Umar Patek, before Patek's leaving to Pakistan, and with Khadaffy Janjalani (deceased). Zulkifli was indicted for arrest on 1 August 2007 in the United States District Court for the Northern District of California.

While hiding in Mindanao under the protection of the Bangsamoro Islamic Freedom Fighters (BIFF), he continued to stay involved in militant Islamic activity and terrorist bombings. An anonymous military source told Gulf News that, along with other South Eastern Asian militants, Zulkifli was engaged in the training of local jihadist volunteers to join The Islamic State. This was reported after the BIFF declared its allegiance to helping ISIL's cause.

Sources have estimated that during his militant activity in Mindanao he may have trained up to 300 terrorists in explosives use, detonation, and building.

It was reported from news organisations on 26 January 2015, that the Jemaah Islamiyah in co-ordination with Zulkifli had planned to construct a bomb to be detonated as the papal convoy drove down T.M. Kalaw Street in Manila on 18 January. The source also claimed that another attempt on the Pope's life was planned the day before, but was thwarted by changes in the Pope's plans. Filipino police have denied the legitimacy of these reports.

=== Family connections ===
His brother, Rahmat Abdhir, was arrested in California for conspiracy to provide material support to terrorists, providing material to terrorists, false statements, and providing material to a Specially Designated Global Terrorist (Zulkifli). In an email between the two they discussed the exchange rates and prices of weapons, specifically an M60 machine gun. Further investigation showed that Rahmat had wired over 10,000 dollars to his brother. Federal agents discovered 1,000 rounds of ammunition, scopes to sniper rifles, two-way radios, military training manuals, and materials used to make bombs. Rahmat was refused bail twice, once upon his initial arrest and a second time in 2008. He is currently in custody in a California prison, contrary to unverified reports of his residence being in the Guantanamo Bay detention camp, where he submitted his DNA to confirm his brother's demise. The FBI told Reuters that he was "a person familiar with the testing procedures", indicating they extracted his DNA previously.

His brother-in-law, Taufik bin Abdul Halim was also arrested for terrorist charges in 2001 for involvement in an attempted mall bombing located in Jakarta, Indonesia. The explosive device reportedly triggered early leading to little or no injuries besides Taufik himself, who lost his leg in the explosion. After 12 years in jail for his attempted bombing, Taufik was released and flown back to Johor to be with his family after being pardoned by President of Indonesia Joko Widodo. Malaysian police have promised to monitor his actions due to his high-profile relation to Zulkifli.

Zulkifli Abdhir is the cousin of Malaysian terrorist Mohamad Farik Amin (alias Zubair Zaid), who is also suspected as a main culprit in the 2002 Bali bombings. Amin is one of two Malaysians to be currently detained at the Guantanamo Bay detention camp in Cuba.

== Location and manhunt ==
Early reports claimed that in the Philippines, Zulkifli died during an airstrike on 2 February 2012. The Malaysian government asked for an official DNA comparison to the DNA of one of Zulkifli's siblings. DNA results were obtained from family members of Zulkifli. His body was never found despite reports of his death. The statements of his supposed death were later retracted as the manhunt continued.

Von Al Haq, a spokesperson for the Moro Islamic Liberation Front (MILF), claimed in 2013 that Zulkifli was being protected by Ameril Umbra Kato's Bangsamoro Islamic Freedom Fighters (BIFF). This claim was later corroborated by an interrogation with a detained Abu Sayyaf commander, Khair Mundos, who claimed that he travelled to the Bangsamoro Islamic Freedom Fighters with Zulkifli. Local informants have also claimed Zulkifli to have visited the province of Maguindanao. The detained Abu Sayyaf leader claimed that Zulkifli, and other high ranking Jemaah Islamiyah leader, Muhamda "Muawiyah" Ali, escaped the February airstrike that was reported to have killed them in Sulu and have taken refuge with the Bangsamoro separatists.

=== 2015 Mamasapano clash and death ===
The Philippine National Police Special Action Force attempted an operation on 25 January 2015 to arrest Zulkifli. The operation culminated in a battle in Mamasapano between the PNP and the Moro Islamic Liberation Front (MILF), breaking the ceasefire. The MILF was later joined by their breakaway group, the Bangsamoro Islamic Freedom Fighters, in a battle that led to the death of 44 police officers, several civilians, and at least 18 militants. The Philippines mobilised more reinforcements though they were cautious in attempting to not create more civilian casualties. Reasons for the clashes and renewed hostilities are being attributed to a lack of communication between the PNP, the military, and MILF before undertaking the operation. It was thought of as "highly likely" that Zulkifli had been killed in the raid until the FBI provided DNA confirmation of his demise in the clash.

== Death ==
Reports say that he was killed by SAF officer(s) on 25 January 2015. Early in the morning of 25 January 2015, Zulkifli was reportedly taken by surprise as his nipa hut was raided by SAF member(s) who proceeded to shoot and kill Zulkifli after a brief exchange of fire. The commandos sent a cellphone message back to their base saying: "Mike 1 bingo", a code to be used in case Zulkifli was neutralised. An SAF officer severed one of Zulkifli's fingers and retrieved a hair sample to bring back for official DNA testing, as Zulkifli's body could not be recovered in time due to heavy fire. His corpse was quickly buried by civilians in accordance with Islamic tradition. Regional governor Mujiv Sabbihi Hataman has stated that the body could not be exhumed as that would go against Islamic burial practices. The FBI were requested to help confirm Marwan's DNA samples.

The status of his death remained controversial for a while after it was reported, due to the Sulu airstrike incident in 2012, where the military incorrectly reported Zulkifli's death until August 2014. Despite claims of his demise, the Moro National Liberation Front (MNLF) claimed that Marwan was still alive. The MNLF confirmed Zulkifli's demise in the clash and continues to state that they have not been sheltering Zulkifli. The MNLF said that based on an intelligence report they received that said Marwan is dead as a result of the encounter. MILF chairman Al-Hajj Murad Ebrahim also told that Abdul Basit Usman, who was also pursued by SAF troops was able to escape.

It was reported that his last words as he attempted to fire against the SAF officers raiding his nipa hut were "Allahu Akbar!"

=== DNA confirmation ===
On 4 February 2015, the FBI sent a message to Philippine authorities confirming that the DNA obtained from the killed man during the PNP Special Action Force Operation Exodus was from Zulkifli. Though absolute identification was not possible in the preliminary stages of testing, the FBI has reported that the DNA samples were very likely to be Zulkifli's due to striking similarities.

The FBI officially confirmed Zulkifli's death on April 1, 2015.

=== Reactions to death from Abdhir family ===
His family in Malaysia have said that they have no intention to claim his body, his daughter said "To us, our father died a long time ago, there is no need to claim the body."

A male relative said; "Our family had been informed six times, over the years, that he had been killed. I am tired of saying Inna lillahi wa inna ilayhi raji'un (surely we belong to Allah and to Him shall we return). All he told us were lies after lies. We are the ones who were forced to face the predicament of his doings. More so after he was labeled as the mastermind behind the 2002 Bali Bombings." adding that the only person who still saw the good in Marwan was his mother. The same male relative spoke angrily of Zulkifli's brother Rahmat and claimed that he was highly impressionable and was manipulated by Zulkifli into providing the support that he did. The relative blamed Zulkifli for ruining Rahmat's life, including for his children and wife.

== See also ==
- Mamasapano clash
- Abu Sayyaf
- Abdul Basit Usman
- Azahari Husin
- Noordin Mohammad Top
- Jemaah Islamiyah
- Khadaffy Janjalani
- Kumpulan Mujahidin Malaysia
- Umar Patek
