= Felipe Rojas =

Chilean footballer (born 1986)

Personal information
- Full name: Felipe Reinaldo Rojas Pavez
- Date of birth: 2 January 1986 (age 40)
- Place of birth: Rancagua, Chile
- Height: 1.81 m (5 ft 11 1/2 in)
- Position: Forward

Senior career*
| Years | Team | Apps | (Gls) |
| 2007–2010 | O'Higgins | | |
| 2007 | → Colchagua (loan) | | |
| 2011–2012 | Cobreloa | | |
| 2013 | Deportes Copiapó | | |
| 2013–2015 | Curicó Unido | | |
| 2015–2016 | Santiago Morning | | |
- * Club domestic league appearances and goals as of 22 March 2020

Felipe Reinaldo Rojas Pavez (born 2 March 1986) is a Chilean footballer.

He currently played for Santiago Morning.
