= Jesus Verzosa =

Filipino police general

Retired P/DIR-GEN Jesus Verzosa

Chief of the Philippine National Police
- In office September 27, 2008 – September 14, 2010
- Preceded by: P/Dir. Gen. Avelino I. Razon Jr.
- Succeeded by: P/Dir. Gen. Raul M. Bacalzo

Personal details
- Born: Jesus Ame Verzosa; December 25, 1954 (age 71) Dasol, Pangasinan Philippines
- Education: Philippine Military Academy
- Police career
- Service: Philippine National Police
- Allegiance: Philippines
- Divisions: Criminal Investigation and Detection Group; Intelligence Group
- Service years: 1976–2010
- Rank: Police Director General

Jesus Ame Verzosa (born December 25, 1954) is a Filipino retired police officer who served as the chief of the Philippine National Police.

== Early life and education ==
Verzosa was born on December 25, 1954 at Dasol, Pangasinan to Pedro Verzosa, a retired Army colonel and Luz Ame Versoza. He then took his basic education at Muntinlupa, Rizal, graduating from NBP Reservation's Itaas Elementary School in 1967 and Muntinlupa High School in 1971, both as class valedictorian. He then entered the Philippine Military Academy and graduated as part of the "Magilas" Class of 1976. Among his classmates are former Armed Forces of the Philippines Chiefs of Staff Alexander Yano and Victor Ibrado, as well as former Thailand Mine Action Center Director General Tumrongsak Deemongkol.

He later finished his Bachelor of Laws at Jose Rizal College in 1996, and earned his Master in Business Administration from Northwestern College in 2000.

== Career ==
Upon graduation in 1976, Verzosa was commissioned as a Second Lieutenant at the Philippine Constabulary. He was assigned to Mindanao initially as a platoon leader and later as company commander at the 54th PC Battalion. After this stint, he was assigned at the Philippine Constabulary Metropolitan Command and in 1986, became the Chief of the Intelligence and Investigation Branch of the Rizal PC/INP Command.

He also served as District Director of the Western Visayas Criminal Investigation Service, Commanding Officer of the 358th PC Company in Leyte, and Regional Officer of the 4th CIS Regional Office in Southern Tagalog. Interestingly, Verzosa was the chief of the 4th CIS Regional Office when the Sarmienta-Gomez slay case happened. He led the investigations that led to the arrest of Antonio Sanchez, the Mayor of Calauan, Laguna.

After his stint in 4th CIS, he served as City Director of the Baguio City Police Office, Regional Officer of the NCR CIG, Director of the PNP Aviation Security Group, and the PNP Intelligence Group. He also served as Police Regional Director of the Cordillera and CALABARZON Regions, before becoming the head of the Criminal Investigation and Detection Group, and PNP Deputy Director General for Administration.

On September 27, 2008, Verzosa was appointed by President Gloria Macapagal Arroyo to be the PNP Chief, replacing Avelino Razon. He retired early on September 14, 2010, replaced by General Raul Bacalzo.

=== Corruption scandal ===
On July 19, 2023, the Sandiganbayan found Versoza and other former police officials guilty for violation of Republic Act No. 3019 or the Anti-Graft and Corrupt Practices Act's Section 3 paragraph (e). It is due to an anomaly on acquiring rescue and patrol rubber boats for the PNP. In 2024, the Sandiganbayan acquitted Verzosa of graft in a case involving the anomalous purchase of second-hand helicopters for the PNP in 2009.
