= Presidency of Benigno Aquino III =

Philippine presidential administration from 2010 to 2016

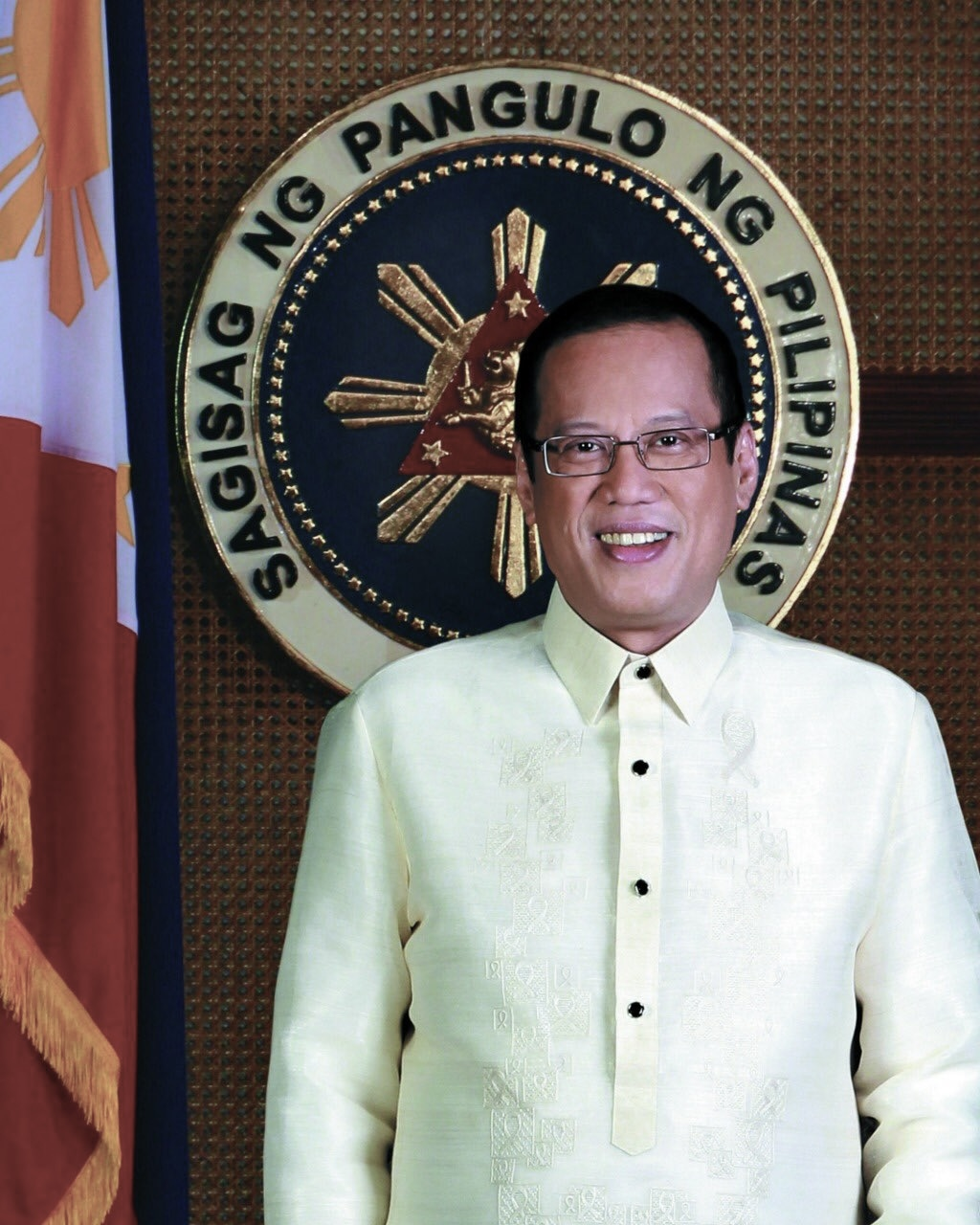
- Official portrait, 2010
- Presidency of Benigno Aquino III; June 30, 2010 – June 30, 2016
- President: Benigno S. Aquino III
- Vice President: Jejomar Binay
- Cabinet: See list
- Party: Liberal
- Election: 2010
- Seat: Malacañang Palace, Manila
- Seal of the President

Benigno Aquino III began his presidency at noon on June 30, 2010, following his inauguration as the 15th president of the Philippines, succeeding Gloria Macapagal Arroyo. Aquino, the third-youngest person elected president, is the only son of the 11th president, Corazon Aquino, and former senator Benigno Aquino Jr.

Aquino continued the process of implementing the K–12 curriculum in the country that started when the Omnibus Education Reform Act of 2008 (Senate Bill 2294) was filed on May 20, 2008 and emphasized later by ASEAN Charter on December 15, 2008 both during the presidency of his predecessor Gloria Macapagal Arroyo. He enacted the Reproductive Health Bill, providing universal access to methods on contraception. He launched the public-private partnership program to hasten infrastructure development, and formed a commission to investigate issues and corruption allegations against his predecessor, President Gloria Macapagal-Arroyo.

Aquino extended the modernization program of the military for 15 years. He signed the Enhanced Defense Cooperation Agreement, allowing the United States's military to rotate troops into the Philippines for extended stays and authorizing the US to build and operate facilities on Philippine bases.

Aquino oversaw the Manila hostage crisis, the impeachment of Chief Justice Renato Corona, the Typhoon Yolanda government response, the Zamboanga City crisis, and the Mamasapano clash.

== 2010 presidential election ==
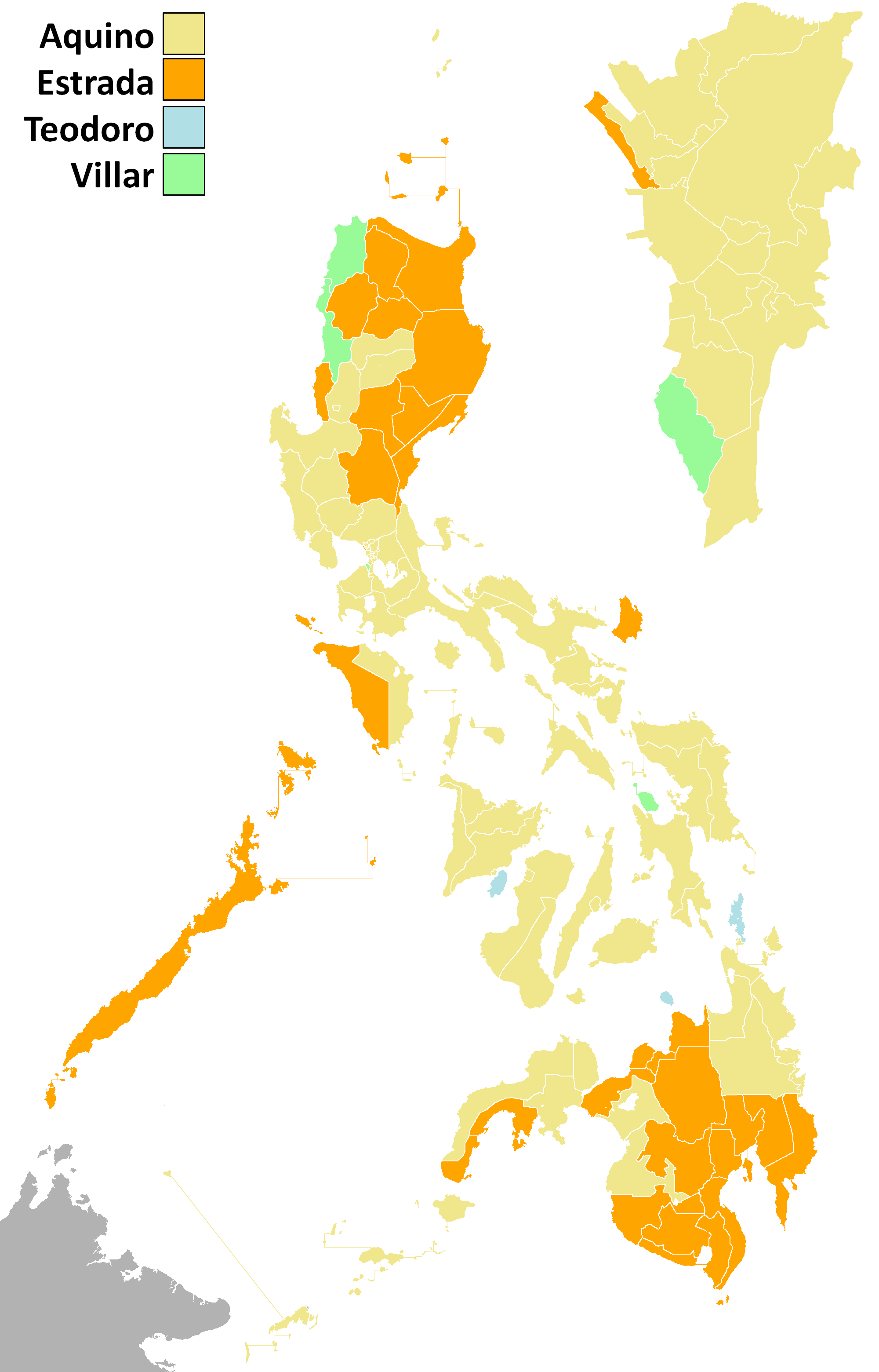
Results of the 2010 Philippine presidential election

Aquino emerged as a potential candidate for the Philippine presidency in 2007 after placing sixth in the 2007 Philippine Senate election where he received 14,309,349 votes. Initially he was not the designated standard bearer for the presidential elections by his political party, the Liberal Party, which originally designated his ally, Sen. Manuel "Mar" Roxas, as its standard bearer on November 26, 2008.

Following the death of his mother, President Corazon Aquino, due to colorectal cancer on August 1, 2009, there was an outpouring of nostalgia among the public for the former democracy icon's brand of clean, honest, and selfless public service. Supporters of the Aquino family called on Noynoy to run for presidency, in what has been called "The Noynoy Phenomenon", to continue his mother's legacy. On August 27, 2009, Edgardo "Eddie" Roces, son of the late Chino Roces, former publisher and owner of the Manila Times, and a group of lawyers and activists formed the Noynoy Aquino for President Movement, a nationwide campaign to collect a million signatures to persuade Aquino to run for president.

Pivotal to Aquino's presidential candidacy was Roxas' announcement of his withdrawal from the presidential race and nomination of Aquino to be his party's presidential standard bearer on September 1, 2009; After much forethought, Aquino accepted the nomination shortly after, and on November 28, 2009, filed his candidacy for president under the Aquino–Roxas tandem.

In the May 2010 presidential elections, Aquino received 15,208,678 votes or 42.08% of the total votes cast, defeating rivals former Philippine president Joseph Estrada, Sen. Manuel Villar, Defense Secretary Gilbert Teodoro, television evangelist Eddie Villanueva and Sen. Richard Gordon. Roxas lost the vice presidential race to Estrada's running mate, Makati mayor Jejomar Binay of the PDP–Laban party.

== Transition and inauguration ==
The presidential transition began on June 9, 2010, when the Congress of the Philippines proclaimed Aquino as the winner of the 2010 Philippine presidential elections held on May 10, 2010, proclaiming Aquino as the president-elect of the Philippines. The transition was in charge of the new presidential residence, cabinet appointments and cordial meetings between them and the outgoing administration.

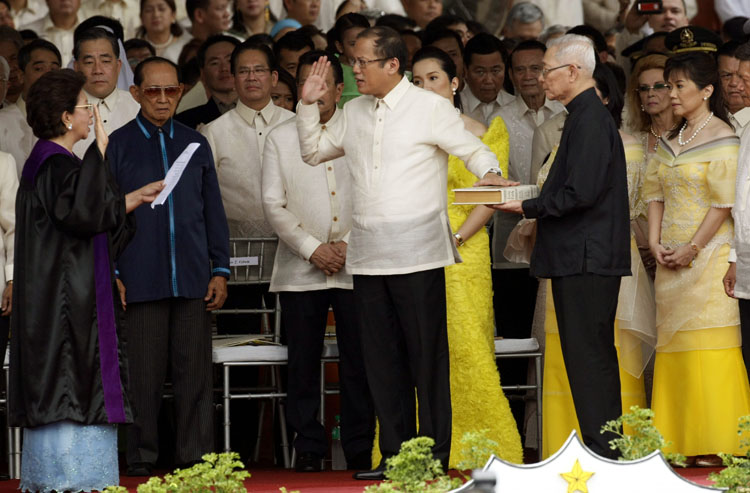
Aquino taking his oath of office as the 15th president of the Philippines on June 30, 2010, at the Quirino Grandstand in Manila.

Aquino took the oath of office on June 30, 2010, at the Quirino Grandstand in Rizal Park, Manila. Traditionally, it is the chief justice of the Supreme Court of the Philippines who administers the oath of office to the incoming president and vice president. However, Aquino refused to allow Chief Justice Renato Corona to swear him into office, due to Aquino's opposition to the midnight appointment of Corona by outgoing President Gloria Macapagal Arroyo on May 12, 2010, two days after the 2010 elections and a month before Arroyo's term expires. Instead, Aquino formally requested Associate Justice of the Supreme Court of the Philippines Conchita Carpio-Morales, who opposed the midnight appointment of Corona, to administer his oath of office.

After being sworn in as the fifteenth president of the Philippines, succeeding Gloria Macapagal Arroyo, Aquino delivered his inaugural address.

== Official residence ==
During his inauguration, Aquino stated that he did not want to live in Malacañan Palace, the official residence of the president of the Philippines, or in Arlegui Mansion, the residence of former presidents Corazon Aquino and Fidel V. Ramos, stating that the two residences were too big. He also stated that his small family residence at Times Street in Quezon City would be impractical, since it would be a security concern for his neighbors. Instead, Aquino decided to use the Bahay Pangarap (English: House of Aspiration), located inside Malacañang Park, at the headquarters of the Presidential Security Group across the Pasig River from Malacañan Palace. Aquino is the first president to make Bahay Pangarap his official residence. The house, which originally had one bedroom, was renovated for Aquino to have four bedrooms, a guest room, a room for Aquino's household staff, and a room for Aquino's close-in security.

== Administration and cabinet ==
On June 29, 2010, Aquino officially named the members of his Cabinet. He appointed himself as the secretary of the Department of the Interior and Local Government (DILG), briefly holding the position from June 30 to July 9, 2010, until he named Jesse Robredo, a former Naga mayor, as the new DILG secretary. The appointment of Robredo drew controversy after Aquino declined Vice President-elect Jejomar Binay's request to head the DILG. Instead, Aquino offered Binay various positions, such as, to head a commission that will investigate the outgoing Arroyo administration, the posts of Secretary of Agrarian Reform, chairman of the Housing and Urban Development Coordinating Council (HUDCC), and the chairman of Metropolitan Manila Development Authority; Binay initially refused, but has shortly after accepted to take charge of the housing sector as chairman of the HUDCC.

Member party	Liberal Party; Akbayan; National Unity Party; Nationalist People's Coalition (until 2016); PDP–Laban (Pimentel faction; until 2015); Nacionalista Party (from 2012)
Opposition party	United Nationalist Alliance; Pwersa ng Masang Pilipino; Lakas–CMD

Office	Name	Term
President Head of state Head of government	H.E. Benigno S. Aquino III	June 30, 2010 – June 30, 2016
Vice President	H.E. Jejomar C. Binay	June 30, 2010 – June 30, 2016
Cabinet Secretary	Jose Rene Almendras	November 5, 2012 – March 8, 2016
Executive Secretary	Paquito Ochoa, Jr.	June 30, 2010 – June 30, 2016
Secretary of Agrarian Reform	Virgilio de los Reyes	June 30, 2010 – June 30, 2016
Secretary of Agriculture	Proceso Alcala	June 30, 2010 – June 30, 2016
Secretary of Budget and Management	Florencio Abad	June 30, 2010 – June 30, 2016
Secretary of Education	Br. Armin Luistro FSC	June 30, 2010 – June 30, 2016
Secretary of Energy	Jose Rene Almendras	June 30, 2010 – November 4, 2012
Secretary of Energy	Carlos Jericho Petilla	November 5, 2012 – April 30, 2015
Secretary of Energy	Zenaida Monsada*	July 2, 2015 – June 30, 2016
Secretary of Environment and Natural Resources	Ramon Paje	June 30, 2010 – June 30, 2016
Secretary of Finance	Cesar Purisima* ‡	June 30, 2010 – June 30, 2016
Secretary of Foreign Affairs	Alberto Romulo	June 30, 2010 – February 23, 2011
Secretary of Foreign Affairs	Albert del Rosario	February 24, 2011 – March 7, 2016
Secretary of Foreign Affairs	Jose Rene Almendras (in acting capacity)	March 8, 2016 – June 30, 2016
Secretary of Health	Dr. Enrique Ona* ‡	June 30, 2010 – December 19, 2014
Secretary of Health	Dr. Janette Garin	February 17, 2015 – June 30, 2016
Secretary of the Interior and Local Government	Benigno Aquino III (Acting) (in concurrent capacity as President)	June 30, 2010 – July 9, 2010
Secretary of the Interior and Local Government	Jesse Robredo	July 9, 2010 – August 18, 2012
Secretary of the Interior and Local Government	Paquito Ochoa, Jr. (in acting capacity)	August 21, 2012 – September 19, 2012
Secretary of the Interior and Local Government	Mar Roxas	September 20, 2012 – September 10, 2015
Secretary of the Interior and Local Government	Mel Senen Sarmiento	September 11, 2015 – June 30, 2016
Secretary of Justice	Leila de Lima* ‡	June 30, 2010 – October 12, 2015
Secretary of Justice	Alfredo Benjamin Caguioa	October 12, 2015 – January 21, 2016
Secretary of Justice	Emmanuel Caparas (in acting capacity)	January 22, 2016 – June 30, 2016
Secretary of Labor and Employment	Rosalinda Baldoz* ‡	June 30, 2010 – June 30, 2016
Secretary of National Defense	Ret. Lt. Gen. Voltaire Gazmin, AFP	June 30, 2010 – June 30, 2016
Secretary of Public Works and Highways	Rogelio Singson	June 30, 2010 – June 30, 2016
Secretary of Science and Technology	Engr. Mario Montejo	June 30, 2010 – June 30, 2016
Secretary of Social Welfare and Development	Corazon Soliman	June 30, 2010 – June 30, 2016
Secretary of Socioeconomic Planning and Director General of the National Economic Development Authority	Cayetano Paderanga, Jr.	August 3, 2010 – May 10, 2012
Secretary of Socioeconomic Planning and Director General of the National Economic Development Authority	Arsenio Balisacan	May 10, 2012 – January 24, 2016
Secretary of Socioeconomic Planning and Director General of the National Economic Development Authority	Emmanuel Esguerra (in acting capacity)	February 1, 2016 – June 30, 2016
Secretary of Tourism	Alberto Lim	June 30, 2010 – August 12, 2011
Secretary of Tourism	Ramon Jimenez, Jr.	September 1, 2011 – June 30, 2016
Secretary of Trade and Industry	Gregory Domingo	June 30, 2010 – December 31, 2015
Secretary of Trade and Industry	Adrian S. Cristobal Jr.	January 1, 2016 – June 30, 2016
Secretary of Transportation and Communications	Jose de Jesus	June 30, 2010 – June 30, 2011
Secretary of Transportation and Communications	Mar Roxas	July 4, 2011 – October 18, 2012
Secretary of Transportation and Communications	Joseph Emilio Abaya	October 18, 2012 – June 30, 2016
Secretary of Presidential Communications Development and Strategic Planning	Ricky Carandang	July 30, 2010 – December 31, 2013
Secretary of Presidential Communications Development and Strategic Planning	Manuel Quezon III	January 1, 2014 – June 30, 2016
Secretary of the Presidential Communications Operations Office	Dr. Herminio Coloma, Jr.	June 30, 2010 – June 30, 2016
Presidential Spokesperson	Sec. Edwin Lacierda	June 30, 2010 – June 30, 2016
Deputy Presidential Spokesperson	Usec. Abigail Valte	June 30, 2010 – June 30, 2016
Chief of the Presidential Management Staff	Julia Abad	June 30, 2010 – June 30, 2016
Chief Presidential Legal Counsel	Eduardo de Mesa	June 30, 2010 – December 18, 2012
Chief Presidential Legal Counsel	Alfredo Benjamin Caguioa	January 10, 2013 – October 12, 2015
Solicitor General	Jose Anselmo Cadiz	July 30, 2010 – February 3, 2012
Solicitor General	Francis Jardeleza	February 6, 2012 – August 19, 2014
Solicitor General	Florin Hilbay (in acting capacity)	August 20, 2014 – June 18, 2015
Solicitor General	Florin Hilbay	June 19, 2015 – June 30, 2016
Secretary of the Presidential Legislative Liaison Office	Antonino Roman	September 28, 2010 – February 20, 2012
Secretary of the Presidential Legislative Liaison Office	Manuel Mamba	February 20, 2012 – October 16, 2015
Commissioner of Bureau of Internal Revenue	Kim Jacinto-Henares	June 30, 2010 – June 30, 2016
Commissioner of the Bureau of Customs	Angelito Alvarez	July 7, 2010 – September 16, 2011
Commissioner of the Bureau of Customs	Ruffy Biazon	September 16, 2011 – December 6, 2013
Commissioner of the Bureau of Customs	John Philip Sevilla	December 6, 2013 – April 23, 2015
Commissioner of the Bureau of Customs	Alberto Lina	April 23, 2015 – June 30, 2016
Commissioner of the Bureau of Immigration	Rolando Ledesma*	June 30, 2010 – March 9, 2011
Commissioner of the Bureau of Immigration	Ricardo David	March 9, 2011 – July 16, 2013
Commissioner of the Bureau of Immigration	Siegfred Mison (in acting capacity)	July 16, 2013 – December 21, 2013
Commissioner of the Bureau of Immigration	Siegfred Mison	December 21, 2013 – January 6, 2016
Commissioner of the Bureau of Immigration	Ronaldo Geron	January 6, 2016 – June 30, 2016
Executive Director of the Land Transportation Office	Virginia Torres	July 2, 2010 – November 1, 2013
Executive Director of the Land Transportation Office	Alfonso Tan Jr. (in acting capacity)	November 1, 2013 – January 3, 2016
Executive Director of the Land Transportation Office	Roberto Cabrera	January 3, 2016 – June 30, 2016
Chairperson of the Land Transportation Franchising and Regulatory Board	Nelson Laluces	September 13, 2010 – August 23, 2011
Chairperson of the Land Transportation Franchising and Regulatory Board	Jaime Jacob	September 2, 2011 – March 31, 2013
Chairperson of the Land Transportation Franchising and Regulatory Board	Atty. Winston Ginez	April 30, 2013 – June 30, 2016
Commissioner of the National Telecommunications Commission	Gamaliel Cordoba*	August 28, 2009 – June 30, 2016
Chairperson of the Commission on Higher Education	Dr. Patricia Licuanan	June 30, 2010 – June 30, 2016
Director-General of the Technical Education and Skills Development Authority	Joel Villanueva	July 28, 2010 – October 13, 2015
Director-General of the Technical Education and Skills Development Authority	Irene Isaac	October 13, 2015 – June 30, 2016
Chairperson of the Metropolitan Manila Development Authority	Francis Tolentino	July 27, 2010 – October 7, 2015
Chairperson of the Metropolitan Manila Development Authority	Emerson Carlos (in acting capacity)	October 1, 2015 – October 30, 2015
Chairperson of the Metropolitan Manila Development Authority	Emerson Carlos	October 30, 2015 – June 30, 2016
Chairperson of the Mindanao Development Authority	Luwalhati Antonino	September 12, 2010 – September 9, 2016
Lead Convenor of the National Anti-Poverty Commission	Jose Eliseo Rocamora	September 27, 2010 – June 30, 2016
Presidential Adviser for Environmental Protection	Nereus Acosta	August 24, 2011 – June 30, 2016
Presidential Adviser on the Peace Process	Teresita Deles	June 30, 2010 – June 30, 2016
Chief Peace Negotiator	Marvic Leonen	July 15, 2010 – November 21, 2012
Chief Peace Negotiator	Miriam Coronel-Ferrer	December 7, 2012 – June 30, 2016
Presidential Adviser on Political Affairs	Ronald Llamas	January 19, 2011 – June 30, 2016
Presidential Assistant for Rehabilitation and Recovery	Ret. Police Gen. Panfilo Lacson	December 10, 2013 – February 10, 2015
Presidential Assistant for Food Security and Agriculture Modernization	Francis Pangilinan	May 6, 2014 – September 15, 2015
Presidential Assistant for Food Security and Agriculture Modernization	Fredelita Guiza	September 16, 2015 – June 30, 2016
AFP Chief of Staff	Gen. Ricardo David	June 30, 2010 – March 8, 2011
AFP Chief of Staff	Gen. Eduardo Oban Jr.	March 8, 2011 – December 12, 2011
AFP Chief of Staff	Gen. Jessie Dellosa	December 12, 2011 – January 17, 2013
AFP Chief of Staff	Gen. Emmanuel T. Bautista	January 17, 2013 – July 18, 2014
AFP Chief of Staff	Gen. Gregorio Pio Catapang	July 18, 2014 – July 10, 2015
AFP Chief of Staff	Gen. Hernando Iriberri	July 10, 2015 – April 22, 2016
AFP Chief of Staff	Lt. Gen. Glorioso Miranda (in acting capacity)	April 22, 2016 – June 30, 2016
National Security Adviser	Cesar Garcia	July 9, 2010 – June 30, 2016
Director General of the National Intelligence Coordinating Agency	Triunfo Salazar	July 9, 2010 – November 26, 2013
Director General of the National Intelligence Coordinating Agency	Ager Ontog Jr.	November 26, 2013 – June 30, 2016
Executive Director of the National Disaster Risk Reduction and Management Council and Administrator of the Office of Civil Defense	Benito Ramos	June 30, 2010 – February 1, 2013
Executive Director of the National Disaster Risk Reduction and Management Council and Administrator of the Office of Civil Defense	Eduardo del Rosario	February 1, 2013 – May 12, 2014
Executive Director of the National Disaster Risk Reduction and Management Council and Administrator of the Office of Civil Defense	Alexander Pama	May 12, 2014 – June 30, 2016
Chief of the Philippine National Police	Police Dir. Gen. Raul Bacalzo	September 14, 2010 – September 9, 2011
Chief of the Philippine National Police	Police Dir. Gen. Nicanor Bartolome	September 9, 2011 – December 17, 2012
Chief of the Philippine National Police	Police Dir. Gen. Alan Purisima	December 17, 2012 – February 5, 2015
Chief of the Philippine National Police	Police Dep. Dir. Gen. Leonardo Espina (in acting capacity)	February 5, 2015 – July 16, 2015
Chief of the Philippine National Police	Police Dir. Gen. Ricardo Marquez	July 16, 2015 – June 30, 2016
Director of the National Bureau of Investigation	Magtanggol Gatdula	July 15, 2010 – January 20, 2012
Director of the National Bureau of Investigation	Nonatus Caesar Rojas (in acting capacity)	January 20, 2012 – July 25, 2012
Director of the National Bureau of Investigation	Nonatus Caesar Rojas	July 25, 2012 – September 2, 2013
Director of the National Bureau of Investigation	Menardo Lemos	September 27, 2013 – January 16, 2014
Director of the National Bureau of Investigation	Virgilio Mendez	January 16, 2014 – June 30, 2016
Chairperson of the Dangerous Drugs Board	Antonio Villar Jr.*	January 5, 2010 – March 7, 2016
Chairperson of the Dangerous Drugs Board	Felipe Rojas Jr.	March 7, 2016 – August 26, 2016
Director General of the Philippine Drug Enforcement Agency	Dionisio Santiago*	June 30, 2010 – January 10, 2011
Director General of the Philippine Drug Enforcement Agency	Jose Gutierrez Jr.	January 10, 2011 – October 11, 2012
Director General of the Philippine Drug Enforcement Agency	Arturo Cacdac, Jr.	October 11, 2012 – June 30, 2016
Director of the Bureau of Corrections	Oscar Calderon*	December 29, 2007 – September 22, 2010
Director of the Bureau of Corrections	Ernesto Diokno	September 22, 2010 – May 30, 2011
Director of the Bureau of Corrections	Gaudencio Pangilinan Jr.	July 28, 2011 – August 16, 2012
Director of the Bureau of Corrections	Manuel Co (in acting capacity)	August 22, 2012 – November 20, 2012
Director of the Bureau of Corrections	Rafael Ragos (in acting capacity)	November 20, 2012 – March 12, 2013
Director of the Bureau of Corrections	Franklin Jesus Bucayu	March 12, 2013 – June 1, 2015
Director of the Bureau of Corrections	Ricardo Rainier Cruz III	June 18, 2015 – June 30, 2016
*Retained from previous administration; ‡Promoted from lower office(s); Source: "Benigno S. Aquino III". Presidential Museum and Library. Archived from the original on July 6, 2016.

=== Judicial appointments ===
==== Supreme Court ====
When Aquino assumed office on June 30, 2010, the Supreme Court of the Philippines was dominated by a Chief Justice and associate justices that were appointed by his predecessor Gloria Macapagal Arroyo. The only vacancy was for the associate justice seat that Renato Corona left behind after Arroyo appointed him Chief Justice on May 17, 2010 — a move that Aquino considered as a midnight appointment. To fill the vacancy, Aquino appointed Maria Lourdes Sereno, a former government counsel in the Fraport case in Singapore involving the construction and turnover of NAIA Terminal 3, as the 169th associate justice on August 13, 2010.

Aquino made no secret of his opposition to Chief Justice Corona's appointment. He openly criticized the latter, such as on December 6, 2011, at the National Criminal Justice Summit held in Manila Hotel, when Aquino said in a speech that Corona, who was seated meters away from him, is beholden to Arroyo. Aside from Arroyo's midnight appointment of Corona, Aquino also questioned the court's granting of a temporary restraining order lifting the watch list order of the Department of Justice against Arroyo and the ruling of Camarines Sur's two new legislative districts as constitutional despite falling short of the required population set by the Constitution, which Aquino earlier questioned in the Supreme Court in 2009.

On December 12, 2011, six days after Aquino's speech, his allies in the House of Representatives, where he has a sizable majority, voted to impeach Corona from his position. Among the violations Corona was accused of committing that were included in the Articles of Impeachment are betrayal of public trust, culpable violation of the Constitution, and graft and corruption stemming from his alleged failure to disclose to the public his Statement of Assets, Liabilities and Net worth as required under the Constitution. In an impeachment trial in the Senate that lasted from December 14, 2011, to May 29, 2012, senators voted to impeach Corona in a 20–3 vote based on Article 2 of the impeachment articles, after it was revealed that Corona failed to disclose four dollar accounts and three peso accounts in his SALN. Following Corona's impeachment, Aquino appointed Sereno as the 24th Chief Justice of the Supreme Court on August 24, 2012.

Aside from Sereno, Aquino also appointed five other associate justices to the Supreme Court:

1. Bienvenido L. Reyes – August 20, 2011
2. Estela Perlas-Bernabe – September 16, 2011
3. Marvic Leonen – November 21, 2012
4. Francis Jardeleza – August 19, 2014
5. Alfredo Benjamin Caguioa – January 22, 2016

== Major issues of presidency ==
=== Speeches ===
Aquino delivers First State of the Nation Address on July 26, 2010.

- Inaugural Address, (June 30, 2010)
- First State of the Nation Address, (July 26, 2010)
- Second State of the Nation Address, (July 25, 2011)
- Third State of the Nation Address, (July 23, 2012)
- Fourth State of the Nation Address, (July 22, 2013)
- Fifth State of the Nation Address, (July 28, 2014)
- Sixth State of the Nation Address, (July 27, 2015)

=== Major acts as president ===
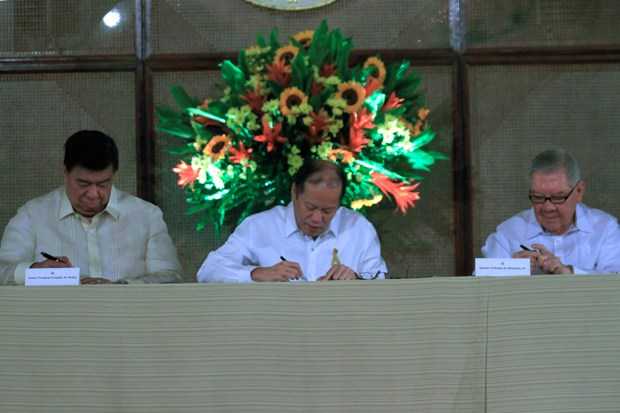
Aquino signs into law the Children's Emergency Relief and Protection Act at the Malacañang Palace on May 17, 2016.

- Enhanced Defense Cooperation Agreement (April 28, 2014)
- AFP Modernization Act
- Enhanced Basic Education Act of 2013
- Responsible Parenthood and Reproductive Health Act of 2012
- Department of Information And Communications Technology Act of 2015
- Cybercrime Prevention Act of 2012
- Philippine Standard Time (PST) Act of 2013
- Comprehensive Firearms and Ammunition Regulation Act
- Sin Tax Reform Law of 2012
- Anti-Enforced or Involuntary Disappearance Act
- Human Rights Victims Reparation and Recognition Act of 2013
- Expanded Anti-Trafficking in Persons Act of 2012
- Domestic Workers Act (Batas Kasambahay)
- National Health Insurance Act of 2013
- Philippine Competition Act
- Foreign Ships Co-Loading Act
- Children's Emergency Relief and Protection Act

=== Executive issuances ===
The Official Gazette lists 206 executive orders, 1,302 proclamations, 90 memorandum orders, 98 memorandum circulars, 49 administrative orders, two special orders, and zero general orders issued by Aquino.

== First 100 days ==
Aquino's first 100 days of his presidency was marked by infighting among factions in his administration. His first executive order declared about 4,000 government positions vacant to rid his administration of people associated with Gloria Macapagal-Arroyo. Aquino suspended projects deemed suspicious and cut salaries of public officials. He received harsh criticism for the Manila hostage crisis, although the event had minimal impact in his approval rating; he finished his 100th day in office with 71% of respondents in an SWS survey satisfied with his performance.

== Domestic policies ==
=== Anti-corruption ===
On June 29, 2010, Aquino announced the formation of a truth commission that will investigate various issues including corruption allegations against outgoing President Gloria Macapagal Arroyo; Aquino named former Chief Justice Hilario Davide, Jr. to head the commission. However, on July 26, 2011, the Supreme Court struck down the commission because it "violated the equal protection clause of the Constitution".

During his inaugural address, Aquino created the no wang-wang policy, strengthening the implementation of Presidential Decree No. 96 issued in 1973 by President Ferdinand Marcos that regulated the use of sirens, horns and other similar devices only to specific motor vehicles such as those used by the President and Vice President. Aquino maintained he would not use wang-wang despite being stuck in traffic. He also traded the official black presidential Mercedes Benz S-Guard limousine for a white Toyota Land Cruiser 200. After his inaugural address, the Metropolitan Manila Development Authority began to enforce Aquino's no wang-wang policy, confiscating wang-wang from public officials and private motorists who illegally used them.

=== Crime ===
==== Manila hostage crisis ====
On August 23, 2010, in front of the Quirino Grandstand in Rizal Park, Manila, the site of Aquino's presidential inauguration, the Manila hostage crisis occurred. Aquino expressed concern over the matter and gave his condolences to the victims. Aquino defended the actions of the police at the scene, stating that the gunman had not shown any signs of wanting to kill the hostages. Aquino ordered a "thorough investigation" into the incident, and would wait until it is completed before deciding whether anyone should lose his or her job. Aquino declared that the media may have worsened the situation by giving the gunman "a bird's-eye view of the entire situation". Aquino also made reference to the Moscow theater hostage crisis, which, according to Aquino, resulted in "more severe" casualties despite Russia's "resources and sophistication". On August 24, 2010, Aquino signed Proclamation No. 23, declaring August 25, 2010, as a national day of mourning, instructing all public institutions nationwide and all Philippine embassies and consulates overseas to lower the Philippine flag at half-mast, in honor of the eight Hong Kong residents who died in the Manila hostage crisis. On August 27, 2010, at a press conference in Malacañang, Aquino apologized to those offended when he was caught on television apparently smiling while being interviewed at the crime scene hours after the Manila hostage crisis. Aquino said;

"My smile might have been misunderstood. I have several expressions. I smile when I'm happy, I smile when I'm faced with a very absurd situation... and if I offended certain people, I apologize to them. It's more of an expression maybe of exasperation rather than anything and again, I apologize if I offended certain people, who misunderstood (my) facial expression."

On September 3, 2010, Aquino took responsibility for everything that happened during the Manila hostage crisis. Aquino had direct supervision of the Philippine National Police, since Aquino had asked Secretary of the Interior and Local Government Jesse Robredo to address other concerns, such as coming up with a comprehensive plan on delivering social services to and relocating informal settlers in coordination with the local governments.

=== Defense ===
In late 2012, Aquino signed Republic Act 10349, extending the modernization program of the Armed Forces of the Philippines (AFP) for an additional 15 years to "boost the AFP's capability upgrade program as it shifts from internal to external defense capability". Aquino signed an administrative order renaming parts of the South China Sea within the Philippines' exclusive economic zone as "West Philippine Sea".

=== Disaster resilience ===
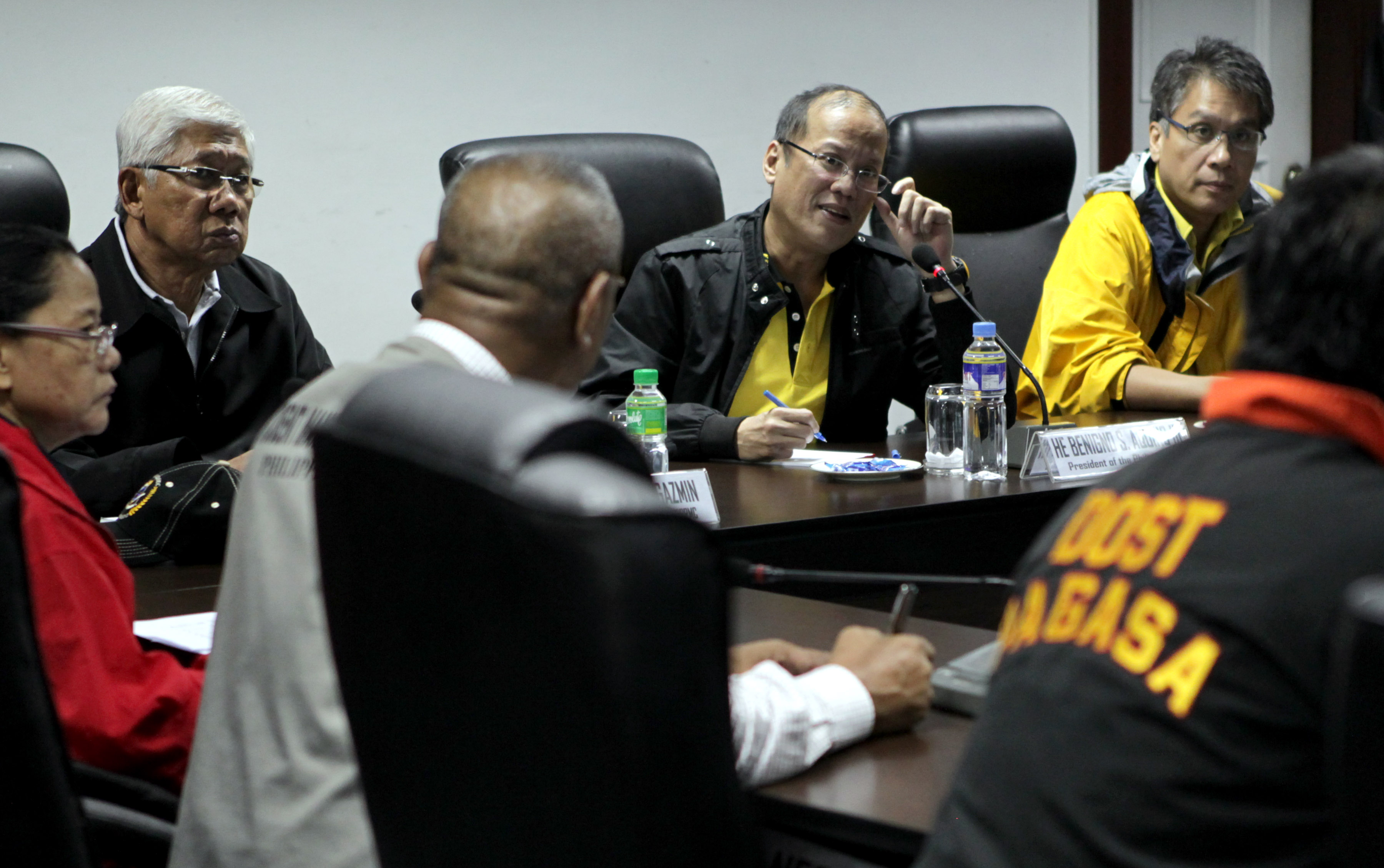
Aquino (center) holds a meeting with various government agencies on the update of the Typhoon Gener on August 8, 2012.

In July 2010, Aquino criticized the Philippine Atmospheric, Geophysical and Astronomical Services Administration (PAGASA) for failing to predict and to warn the residents of Metro Manila that Typhoon Basyang would ravage Metro Manila. In August that year, Aquino announced the removal of Prisco Nilo as administrator of PAGASA. PAGASA was directly under Department of Science and Technology (DOST) Undersecretary for Research and Development (R&D) Graciano Yumul. A special order from DOST Secretary Mario Montejo, dated August 5, 2010, designated Yumul as PAGASA administrator, replacing Nilo. On August 7, 2010, Malacañang announced that Yumul will be heading PAGASA temporarily, for only three months, as PAGASA will undergo a "reorientation" to improve its services.

In July 2012, Aquino launched a disaster risk reduction and management program. In November 2015, he signed a law providing funds to modernize the PAGASA.

=== Education ===
Republic Act No. 10533, or the Enhanced Basic Education Act of 2013

During his first State of the Nation Address (SONA), Aquino announced his intention to continue the implementation of the K–12 education in the Philippines that started on May 20, 2008 during the administration of his predecessor Gloria Macapagal Arroyo, with process spanned for 9 years from 2008 to June 5, 2017 from Arroyo to successor Rodrigo Duterte. On April 24, 2012, the K–12 became effective starting on School Year (SY) 2012-2013 and to maintain continuity, Aquino signed the Enhanced Basic Education Act of 2013 or K-12 Law in May 2013, and the program was carried out by Secretary of Education Bro. Armin Luistro FSC.

=== Energy ===
To provide electricity to far-flung areas of the country, in September 2011, the Aquino administration launched the Sitio Electrification Program, which aimed to energize 32,441 sitios nationwide. By March 2016, three months before Aquino's term of office ended, a total of 32,688 sitios were energized.

=== Environment ===
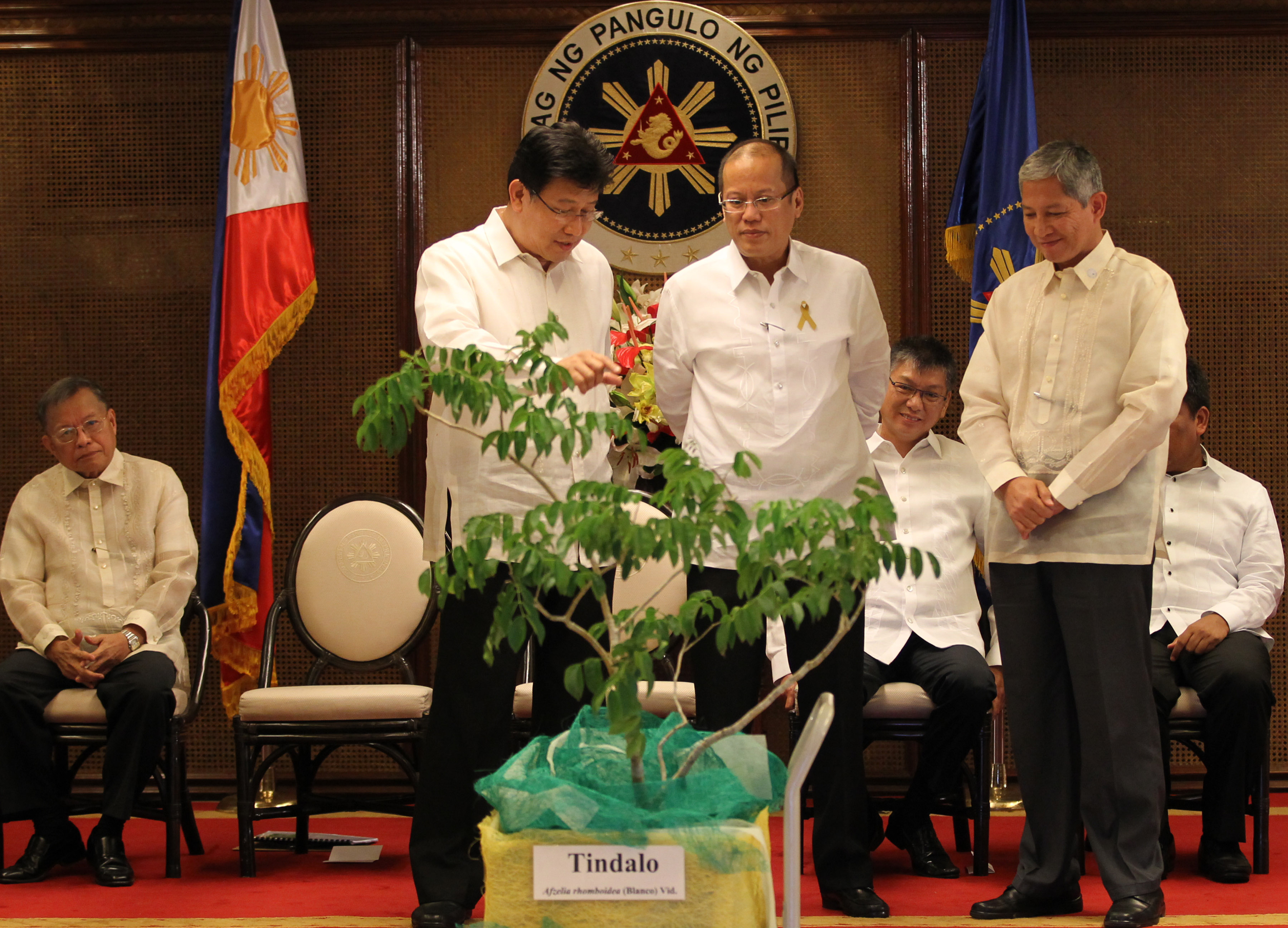
Aquino (standing, center) receives the 100 millionth seedling for the National Greening Program at the Malacañang Palace in June 2012.

In 2011, the Aquino administration launched the National Greening Program as a priority program to help reduce poverty, promote food security, environmental stability, and biodiversity conservation, as well as enhance climate change mitigation and adaptation in the country. The program paved the way for the planting of almost 1.4 billion seedlings in about 1.66 million hectares nationwide during the 2011-2016 period. The Food and Agriculture Organization of the United Nations ranked the Philippines fifth among countries reporting the greatest annual forest area gain, which reached 240,000 hectares during the 2010–2015 period.

Aquino signed an executive order on mining that expanded the "no-go" zones for mining in the country to include 78 tourism sites, and farms, marine sanctuaries, and island ecosystems; the order also limited small scale mining to areas designated as Minahang Bayan, banned small-scale miners from using mercury to process ores, and issued a moratorium on new mining contracts as Congress legislates a revenue sharing scheme.

=== Health ===
Despite the possibility of excommunication from the Catholic Church, Aquino upheld his position on distributing contraceptives to Filipino couples. In January 2013, Aquino signed the Reproductive Health Bill which funds contraceptives for poor individuals; the law has been challenged in the Philippine Supreme Court.

The Aquino administration, through health secretary Janette Garin, launched a school-based dengue immunization program in April 2016. About one million Grade 4 pupils from three regions began to be immunized with Sanofi Pasteur's CYD-TDV (Dengvaxia), the world's first dengue vaccine, less than four months after the Philippines approved the sale of the vaccine. A controversy emerged in 2017 after the vaccine was found to increase the risk of disease severity for some people who had received it.

=== Infrastructure ===
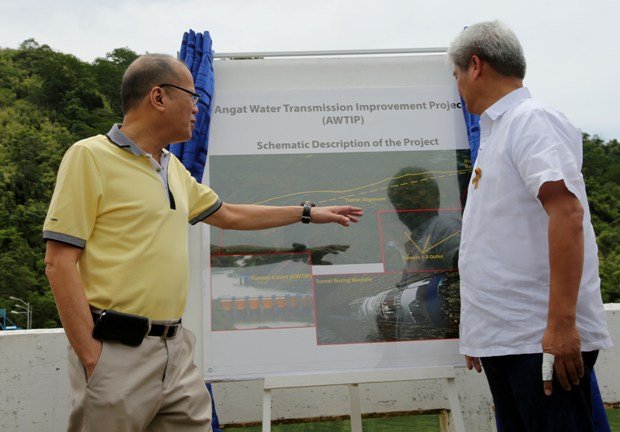
Aquino leads the unveiling ceremony of the Angat Water Transmission Improvement Project in Ipo Dam, Norzagaray, Bulacan on May 26, 2016.

Throughout his presidency, Aquino promoted a larger private sector role in infrastructure development in the Philippines to hasten the financing, construction and operation of key infrastructure projects such as expressways, airports, and railways that would spur economic activity and growth. On September 9, 2010, Aquino signed an executive order reorganizing the Build, Operate and Transfer (BOT) Center into the Public-Private Partnership Center, which was tasked to facilitate, coordinate and monitor all public-private partnership (PPP) projects, build-operate-transfer scheme projects, and private sector participation projects.

The Muntinlupa-Cavite Expressway was the first PPP project approved by the Aquino administration, with Ayala Corporation winning the concession to build and operate the P2.2 billion four-kilometer toll road on December 16, 2011. After delays in the acquisition of right-of-way, construction began in May 2013 and the expressway opened on July 24.

Several other PPP projects were also either approved, constructed or completed during the Aquino administration:

- The P9.89 billion PPP for School Infrastructure Project Phase 1, which the Aquino administration approved on December 19, 2011, aims address the backlog in the number of classrooms in public elementary and high schools in the Philippines by building 9,303 one-storey and two-storey classrooms, including furniture and fixtures, in various sites in Regions I, III and IV-A. The project was completed and inaugurated on January 6, 2016.
- The P3.86 billion PPP for School Infrastructure Project Phase 2, which the Aquino administration approved on November 29, 2012. The project aims to construct 4,370 one-storey, two-storey, three-storey and four-storey classrooms, including furniture, fixtures, and toilets in 1,895 public schools in six regions (Regions I, II, III, X, CAR, and CARAGA). By October 31, 2015, 1,690 classrooms were already completed and delivered to the government, with the rest expected to be completed by the end of 2020.
- The P1.72 billion Automated Fare Collection System for the MRT 3 and LRT Lines 1 and 2, which the Aquino administration approved in 2012, aims to decommission the old magnetic-based ticketing system and replace it with contactless-based smart card technology called the Beep card, with the introduction of a centralized back office that will perform apportionment of revenues. AF Payments Inc., a joint venture of Ayala Corporation and Metro Pacific Investments Corporation won the contract to develop, operate and maintain the fare collection system. The company launched the Beep card in the MRT 3 and LRT Lines 1 and 2 on July 20, 2015. It has since been introduced in other forms of public transportation such as the EDSA Busway, BGC Bus and Cebu's Topline Express Ferries, as well as in convenience stores such as 7-Eleven and Ministop.
- The P26.5 billion Metro Manila Skyway Stage 3, a 14.8-kilometer, elevated expressway envisioned to decongest traffic in Metro Manila, is an extension of the original Skyway project from Buendia to Magallanes (Stage 1) and Magallanes to Alabang (Stage 2), which would connect it with the North Luzon Expressway in Caloocan.

By the end of Aquino's term, only three of the 50 infrastructure projects under the PPP scheme have been completed.

=== Insurgency ===
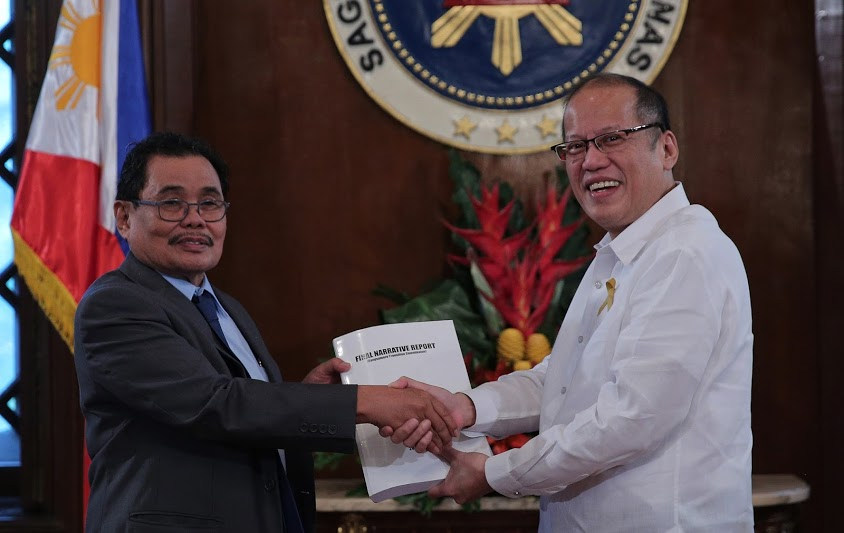
Aquino receives the Bangsamoro Transition Commission Narrative Report from MILF Peace Panel Chair Mohagher Iqbal during a meeting on June 23, 2016.

Aquino rejected declaring a state of emergency amid the Moro National Liberation Front's (MNLF) attempted occupation of Zamboanga City in September 2013.

Under the Aquino administration, the Philippine government heavily focused on pursuing peace talks with the Moro Islamic Liberation Front (MILF), signing in March 2014 a landmark peace agreement with the MILF. The peace deal granted mainly Muslim areas in the southern Mindanao region greater political autonomy in exchange for the MILF surrendering their weapons. Following the Mamasapano clash in Maguindanao which resulted in the deaths of 44 members of the Special Action Force (SAF) of the Philippine National Police in January 2015, public support for the passage of the Bangsamoro Basic Law, a bill establishing a Bangsamoro autonomous region, eroded; the law did not pass in the 16th Congress.

In 2011, the Aquino administration began pursuing peace talks with the Communist Party of the Philippines-New People's Army-National Democratic Front of the Philippines (CPP-NPA-NDF) through the 2011 Oslo Joint Statement, which was mediated by the Royal Norwegian Government. By February 2013, as a precondition to continuing the peace talks, the CPP-NPA-NDF demanded that the Philippine government release 18 of its high-level consultants and stop the military's Oplan Bayanihan counterinsurgency program. The Aquino administration rejected the imposition of the preconditions, questioning the leftist group as a reliable partner in negotiations. Counter-insurgency efforts continued, leading to the arrest of the CPP-NPA chairman Benito Tiamzon and his wife, CPP-NPA secretary-general Wilma on March 22, 2014. The Philippine government and the CPP-NPA ended their ceasefire agreement on January 20, 2015, days before the Mamasapano clash.

=== Telecommunications ===
Prompted by clamors for a government agency that will focus in handling information and communications technology affairs, Aquino, in May 2016, signed a law creating the Department of Information and Communications Technology.

On August 14, 2010, Aquino directed the Department of Transportation and Communications (DOTC) and the National Telecommunications Commission (NTC) to fully implement Executive Order No. 255, issued on July 25, 1987, by former President Corazon Aquino, requiring all radio stations to broadcast a minimum of four original Filipino musical compositions every hour. In an effort to get feedback from people, Aquino launched his official presidential website on August 16, 2010.

== Foreign policies ==
International trips made by Aquino as president

=== South China Sea Arbitration ===
Under the Aquino administration, the Philippines filed an arbitration case against China under Annex VII to the United Nations Convention on the Law of the Sea (UNCLOS) concerning territorial issues in the South China Sea, including China's nine-dash line. The arbitration case, which the Philippines eventually won but China rejected, worsened China-Philippines relations during Aquino's tenure.

=== Enhanced Defense Cooperation Agreement ===
Three hours ahead of United States President Barack Obama's state visit to the Philippines in April 2014, Defense Secretary Voltaire Gazmin and US ambassador Philip Goldberg signed the Enhanced Defense Cooperation Agreement (EDCA), a 10-year military accord allowing American military forces greater access to bases across the Philippines. A month later, Senators Sergio Osmeña III and Bongbong Marcos raised concerns that the agreement benefits the US more than the Philippines.

=== First official trip to the United States ===
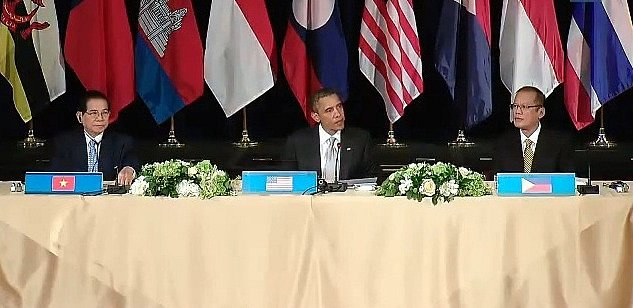
Aquino (right) with US President Barack Obama and ASEAN leaders during a United Nations General Assembly meeting in New York City on September 24, 2010.

On September 20, 2010, Aquino made his first official trip to the United States. On September 23, he delivered his remarks at the Millennium Challenge Corporation (MCC) compact agreement signing ceremony at the Waldorf-Astoria Hotel in New York City; the US$434-million MCC compact agreement will fund the Aquino administration's various programs on poverty reduction, revenue generation, and infrastructure development.

On September 24, 2010, Aquino had a seven-minute one-on-one talk with President of the United States Barack Obama during the 2nd Association of Southeast Asian Nations (ASEAN)-US Leaders Meeting at the Waldorf-Astoria Hotel in New York City. During the meeting, Aquino recognized the United States’ commitment to reinvigorating its relationship with the region and its individual nations at a time of ever-increasing complexity in global affairs. Obama expressed his determination to elevate RP-US relations to a higher level, and welcomed the Aquino administration's anti-corruption efforts. Aquino and Obama also discussed military matters, about the possible removal of thousands of tons of war materials that Allied forces had left behind on Corregidor Island during World War II.

=== First official trip to Vietnam ===
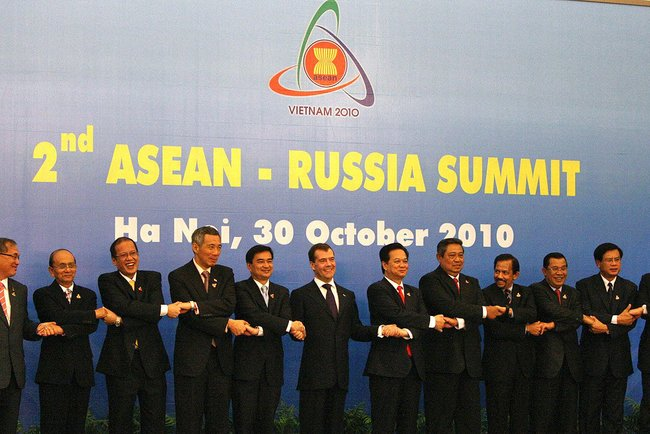
Aquino (3rd from left) and other ASEAN leaders during the 2nd ASEAN-Russia Summit, Hanoi, Vietnam, October 30, 2010.

On October 26, 2010, Aquino met with President of Vietnam Nguyễn Minh Triết at the Presidential Palace in Hanoi, Vietnam. Aquino and Triết signed four memorandum of agreement on four areas of cooperation, namely, higher education, defense, oil spill preparedness and response, and search and rescue at sea. Aquino also met with Prime Minister of Vietnam Nguyễn Tấn Dũng.

=== First official trip to Japan ===
On November 11, 2010, Aquino made his first official trip to Japan for the Asia-Pacific Economic Cooperation (APEC) Summit in Yokohama, Japan.

== Elections during the Aquino III presidency ==
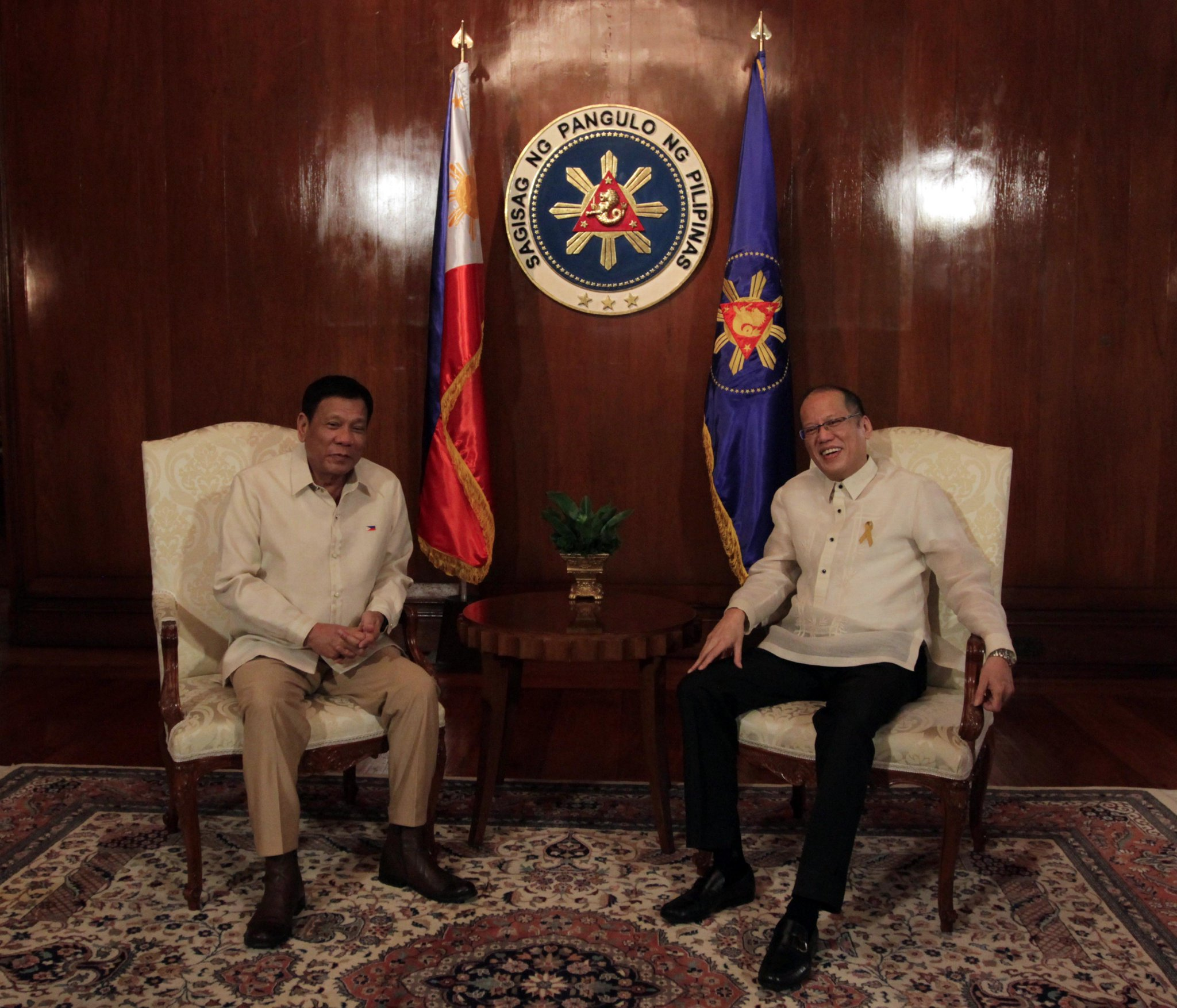
Outgoing President Benigno Aquino III (right) and President-elect Rodrigo Duterte ahead of Duterte's inauguration on June 30, 2016.

Legislative and local elections were held in the Philippines on May 13, 2013. Positions contested included half the seats in the Senate of the Philippines, which are elected for six-year terms, and all the seats in the House of Representatives of the Philippines, who were elected for three-year terms. The duly elected legislators of the 2013 elections joined the elected senators of the 2010 elections to comprise the 16th Congress of the Philippines. Aquino's Team PNoy coalition won 9 senate seats and 112 seats in the house.

Aquino endorsed his interior secretary and long-time ally Mar Roxas for the 2016 presidential election; Roxas lost to Davao City mayor Rodrigo Duterte.
