= Ricardo Gloria =

Filipino government official

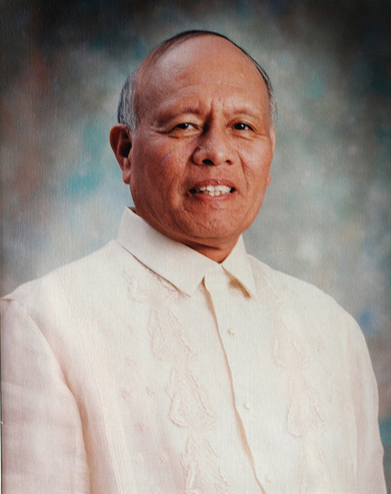

Secretary of Science and Technology
- In office June 30, 1992 – July 6, 1994
- President: Fidel Ramos
- Preceded by: Ceferino Follosco
- Succeeded by: William Padolina

Secretary of Education, Culture and Sports
- In office July 7, 1994 – December 1997
- President: Fidel Ramos
- Preceded by: Armand Fabella
- Succeeded by: Erlinda Pefianco

Personal details
- Born: Ricardo Tumanda Gloria; April 3, 1940 Oroquieta, Misamis Occidental, Philippine Commonwelath
- Died: August 13, 2006 (aged 66) Quezon City, Philippines

Ricardo Tumanda Gloria (April 3, 1940–August 13, 2006) is a Filipino government official who served as Secretary of the Department of Science and Technology of the Philippines then Secretary of the Department of Education, Culture and Sports.

== Early life and education ==
Gloria was born on April 3, 1940, in Oroquieta in Misamis Occidental. He was a University of Southern Mindanao alumnus.

== Career ==
He served as Secretary of the Department of Science and Technology from June 30, 1992, to July 6, 1994. Gloria also served as Secretary of the Department of Education, Culture and Sports from July 7, 1994 to December 1997.

Gloria approved the establishment of Montessori Schools and the Science and Technology Park. In 1994, the Science and Technology Scholarship Act passed, helping students in science and technology fields.

In 2006, Gloria along with other officials of the Fund Assistance for Private Education (FAPE) was accused of plunder of FAPE funds from 1994 to 1998. He was FAPE chairman during that period.

== Death ==
Gloria died August 13, 2006, at the Philippine Heart Center in Quezon City, from diabetes complications.
