= Ceferino Follosco =

Filipino politician (1931–2016)

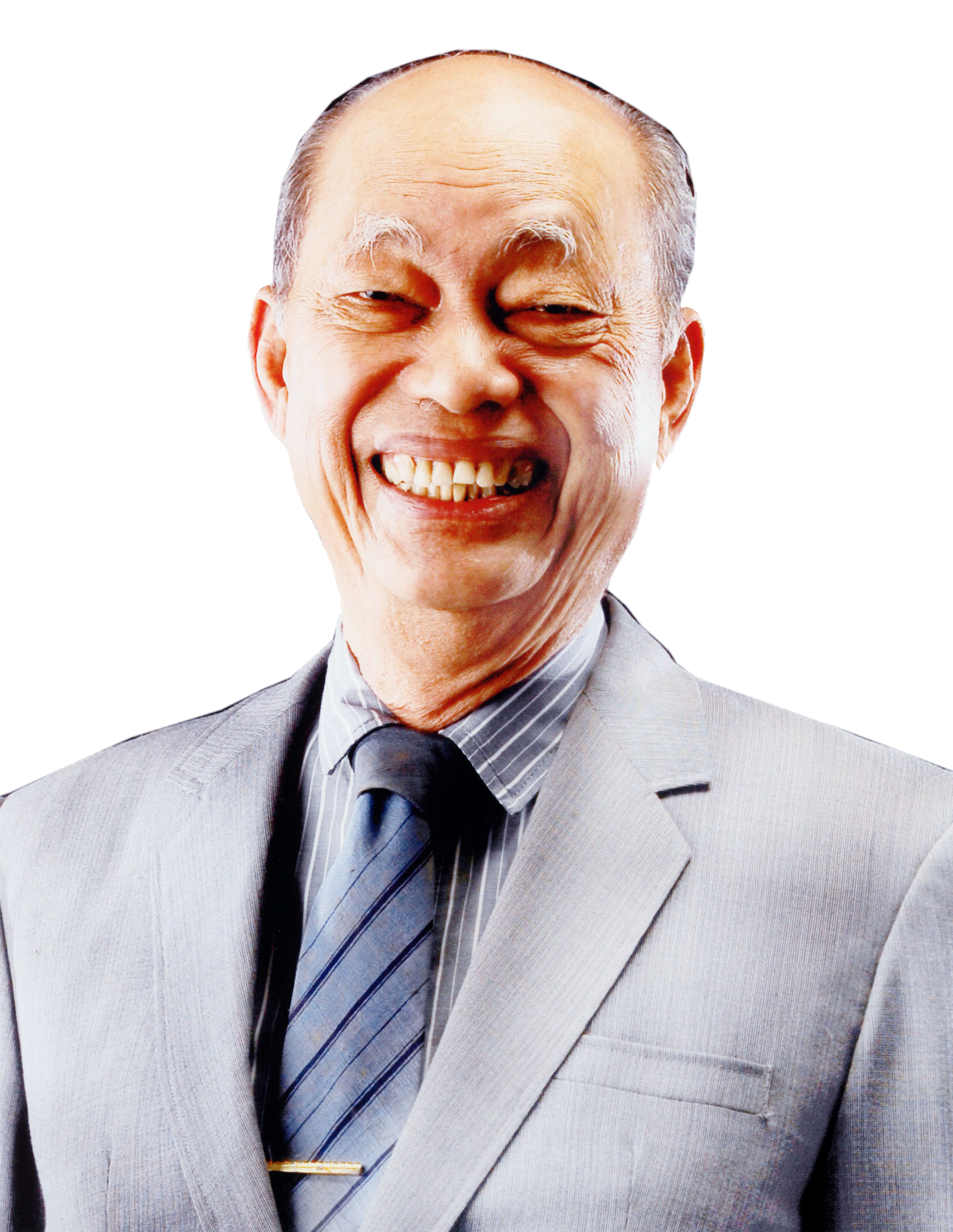

Secretary of Science and Technology
- In office April 7, 1989 – June 30, 1992
- President: Corazon Aquino
- Preceded by: Antonio Arizabal
- Succeeded by: Ricardo Gloria

Personal details
- Born: Ceferino L. Follosco; February 3, 1931 Malabang, Lanao, Philippine Islands
- Died: March 13, 2016 (aged 85)

Ceferino L. Follosco (February 3, 1931 - March 13, 2016) was a Filipino engineer who served as Secretary of the Department of Science and Technology of the Philippines.

== Early life and education ==
Ceferino L. Follosco was born on February 3, 1931, in Malabang, in the then-Lanao province (now Lanao del Sur). He completed a BS (mechanical engineering, 1953) and a BEE (electrical engineering, 1955) at FEATI University. Follosco completed an MS in (agricultural engineering, 1962) at Iowa State University and an MA (Management, 1963) at FEATI.

== Career ==
From 1969 to 1975, Follosco worked for Ford Philippines, heading a team that produced the first Asian Utility Vehicle. From 1986 to 1989, he was an undersecretary of the Department of Trade and Industry and governor of the Board of Investments.

Follosco served as Secretary of Science and Technology from April 7, 1989, to June 30, 1992. He helped develop a comprehensive Science and Technology Masterplan.

Follosco received an honorary doctorate in laws from the University of the Philippines in 1992.

He was named an Academician of the National Academy of Science and Technology in 2001.
