= Antonio Arizabal =

Filipino chemist

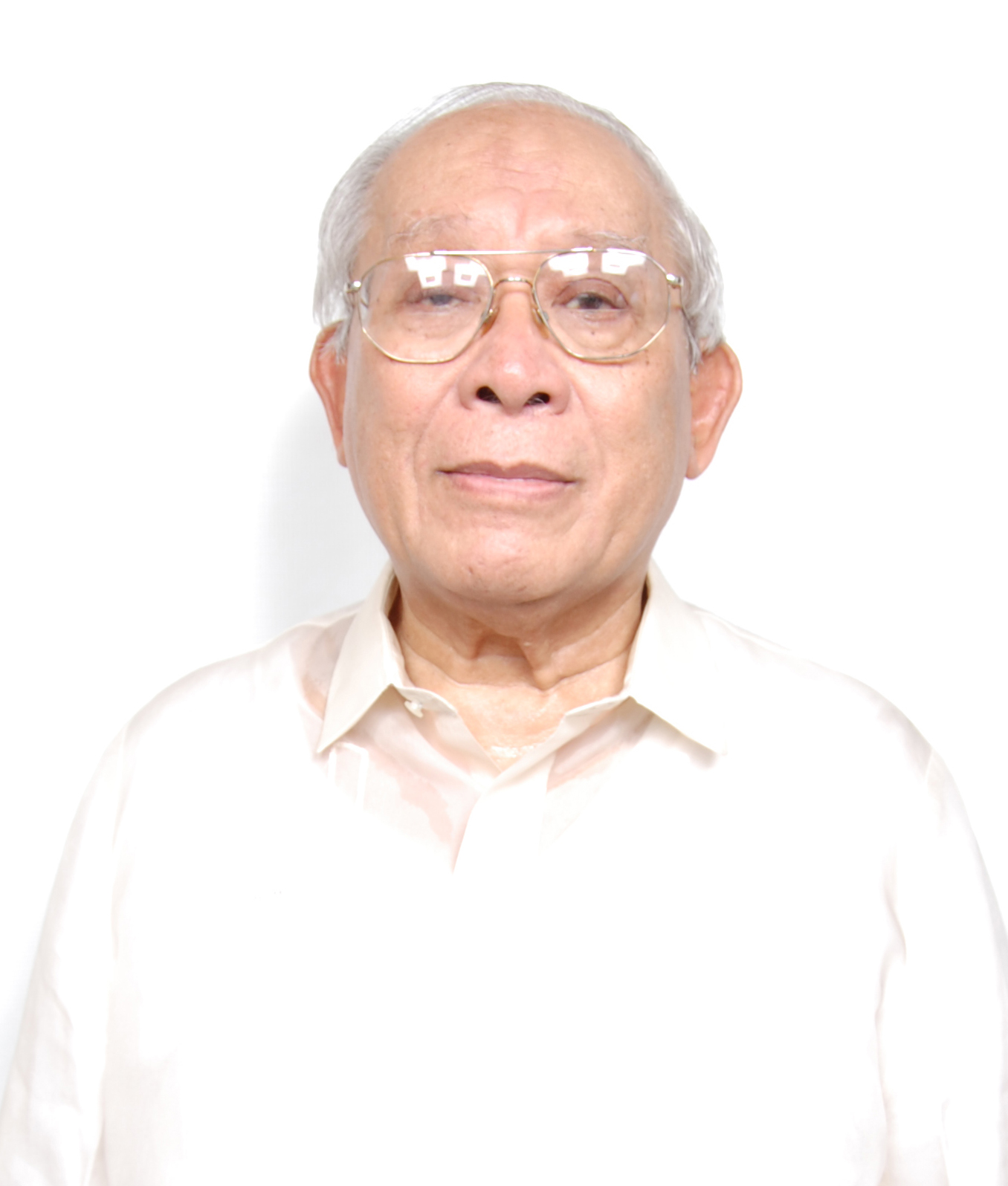

Secretary of Science and Technology
- In office April 7, 1989 – June 30, 1992
- President: Corazon Aquino
- Preceded by: Emil Javier (as National Science Development Board head)
- Succeeded by: Ceferino Follosco

Personal details
- Born: Antonio V. Arizabal Jr. October 13, 1932 (age 93) Manila, Philippine Islands

Antonio V. Arizabal Jr. (born October 13, 1932) is a Filipino chemist who served as Secretary of the Department of Science and Technology of the Philippines.

== Early life and education ==
Antonio V. Arizabal Jr. was born on October 13, 1932, in Manila. He obtained a bachelor's degree in chemistry from the University of the Philippines and a masters and doctorate in metallurgy from the Carnegie Institute of Technology.

== Career ==
In 1971, he was executive director of the Metals Industry Research and Development Center and an ex-officio trustee of the Philippine Iron and Steel Institute. Arizabal was a former CEO for National Steel Corp and served as a receiver in 2000.

Arizabal held the top National Science and Technology Authority position and transitioned to the inaugural Secretary of Science and Technology, holding the position from January 30, 1987, to April 6, 1989. During his tenure, the Food and Nutrition Research Institute's supplemental food formulations helped feed 80,000 malnourished children in Negros Occidental.
