= Secretary of Science and Technology (Philippines) =

Minister of the Department of Science and Technology of the Philippines

- Kalihim ng Agham at Teknolohiya
- Official seal of the Department of Science and Technology

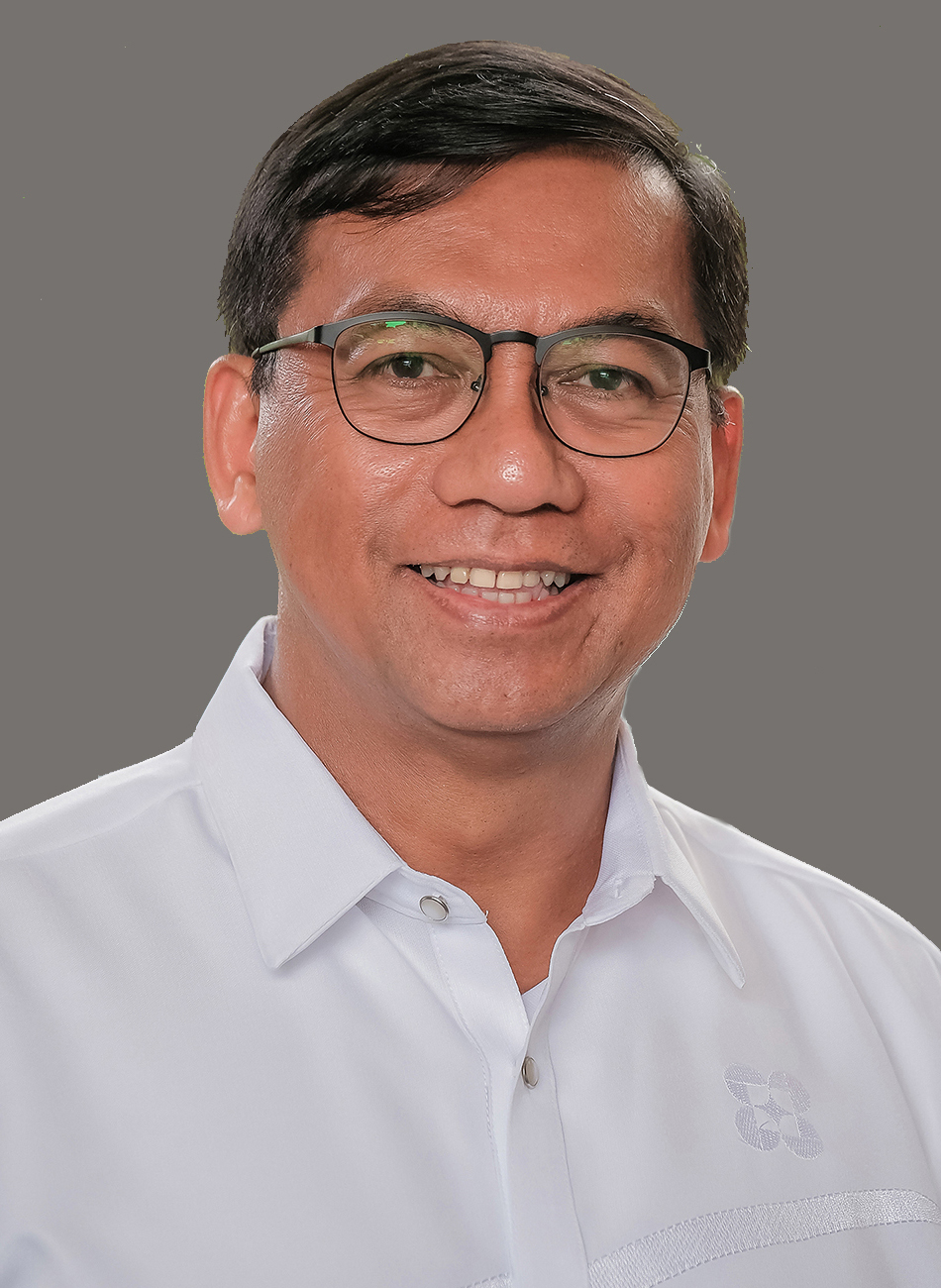
- Incumbent; Renato Solidum Jr. since July 22, 2022
- Style: The Honorable
- Member of: Cabinet
- Appointer: The president with the consent of the Commission on Appointments
- Term length: No fixed term
- Inaugural holder: Antonio V. Arizabal
- Formation: January 30, 1987 (39 years ago)
- Website: www.dost.gov.ph

The secretary of science and technology (Filipino: kalihim ng agham at teknolohiya) is the head of the Department of Science and Technology and is a member of the president's Cabinet.

The Department of Science and Technology was originally established as the National Science and Development Board on June 13, 1958 and was elevated to cabinet level in 1987.

The position was created in 1987 by then president Corazon Aquino, and was first assumed by Antonio Arizabal.

The position is currently held by Renato Solidum Jr. since 2022.

== Lists ==
National Science Development Board

Name	Years served
Paulino Garcia	1958-1963
Juan Salcedo	1963-1970
Florencio Medina	1970-1976
Melencio Magno	1976-1981
Emil Javier	1981-1986

Portrait	Name (Birth–Death)	Took office	Left office	President
	Antonio Arizabal (born 1932)	January 30, 1987	April 6, 1989	Corazon Aquino
	Ceferino Follosco (1931–2016)	April 7, 1989	June 30, 1992	Corazon Aquino
	Ricardo Gloria (1940–2006)	June 30, 1992	July 6, 1994	Fidel V. Ramos
	William Padolina (born 1946)	July 7, 1994	January 29, 1999	Fidel V. Ramos
	William Padolina (born 1946)	July 7, 1994	January 29, 1999	Joseph Estrada
	Filemon Uriarte Jr. (born 1945)	February 1, 1999	January 1, 2001	Joseph Estrada
	Rogelio Panlasigui; Acting	January 2, 2001	March 11, 2001	Joseph Estrada
	Rogelio Panlasigui; Acting	January 2, 2001	March 11, 2001	Gloria Macapagal Arroyo
	Estrella Alabastro (born 1941)	March 12, 2001	June 30, 2010	Gloria Macapagal Arroyo
	Mario Montejo	June 30, 2010	June 30, 2016	Benigno Aquino III
	Fortunato de la Peña (born 1949)	June 30, 2016	June 30, 2022	Rodrigo Duterte
	Renato Solidum Jr. (Note: Renato Solidum Jr. served as Officer in Charge from June 30 until July 22, 2022.)	June 30, 2022	July 22, 2022	Bongbong Marcos
	Renato Solidum Jr.	July 22, 2022	Incumbent	Bongbong Marcos
