= Fortunato de la Peña =

Filipino engineer and government official

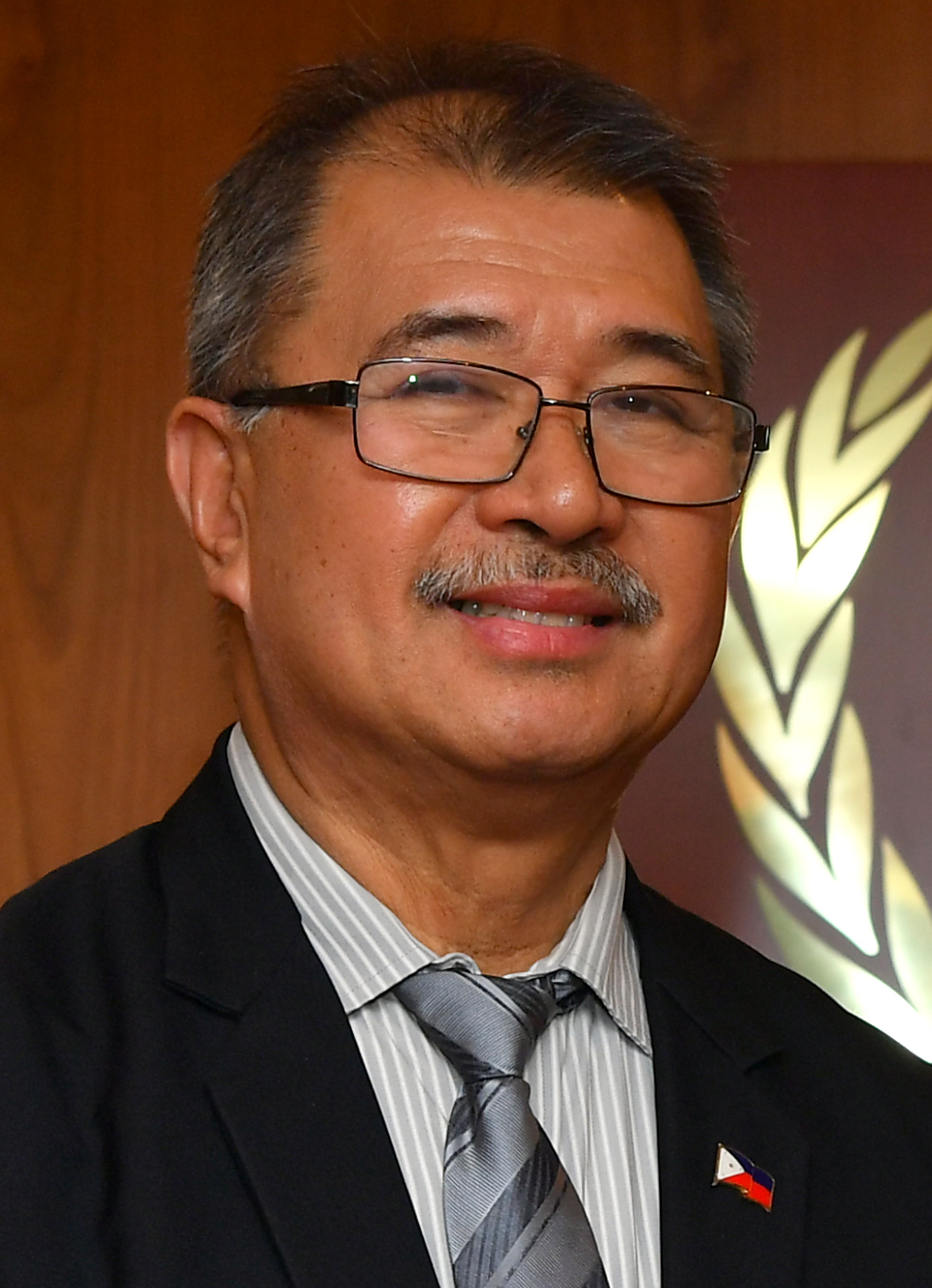
- De la Peña in 2018

Secretary of Science and Technology
- In office June 30, 2016 – June 30, 2022
- President: Rodrigo Duterte
- Preceded by: Mario Montejo
- Succeeded by: Renato Solidum Jr.

Undersecretary for Science and Technology Services of the Department of Science and Technology
- In office 2001–2014
- President: Gloria Macapagal Arroyo; Benigno Aquino III

Personal details
- Born: Fortunato Tanseco de la Peña; November 12, 1949 (age 76) Bulakan, Bulacan, Philippines
- Spouse: Mariquit Tablan Banzon
- Children: 5
- Education: University of the Philippines Diliman (BS, MS, PhD); Erasmus University Rotterdam (PgDip)
- Profession: Engineer, professor, civil servant
- Scientific career
- Fields: Industrial engineering; Chemical engineering
- Workplaces: University of the Philippines Diliman; Department of Science and Technology

Fortunato "Boy" Tanseco de la Peña (born November 12, 1949) is a Filipino engineer and professor who served as the Secretary of Science and Technology in the Cabinet of President Rodrigo Duterte from 2016 to 2022. Before he assumed leadership of the Department of Science and Technology (DOST), he was the Undersecretary for Scientific and Technological Services from 2001 to 2014. Except for his brief retirement from 2014 to 2016, he has been with the department since 1982.

De la Peña has also served as the president of the Philippine Association for the Advancement of Science and Technology (PhilAAST) and is also a former chairman of the United Nations Commission on Science and Technology for Development.

== Early life and education ==
De la Peña was born in the municipality of Bulacan, Bulacan on November 12, 1949. He is the youngest of three children of Emilio Banzon de la Peña and Luz Fajardo Tanseco. He attended the University of the Philippines Diliman in Quezon City where he received his Bachelor of Science degree in chemical engineering in 1969. He also earned his MS degree in industrial engineering and a Ph.D. in business administration from the same university in 1976. He received a postgraduate diploma in Industrial Quality Control from Bouwcentrum International Education at Erasmus University Rotterdam, in the Netherlands in 1975 and pursued took special studies in Operations Research at the Polytechnic University in Brooklyn, New York City, U.S., now merged with New York University, in 1982.

== Career ==
De la Peña is a Career Executive Service Officer (CESO) Rank I, the highest level in the career service of the Civil Service Commission of the Philippines. He has served in the Department of Science and Technology for more than 30 years. He has also served in various positions at his alma mater UP Diliman and also worked as Operations Engineer with ESSO Philippines.

=== UP Diliman ===
De la Peña started his career at UP Diliman when he joined the faculty of the UP College of Engineering in 1978. He was a research assistant of the university and the first editor of the Philippine Engineering Journal. He also chaired its Department of Industrial Engineering and Operations Research until 1988 when he became a full-time Industrial Engineering professor. In 1992, he was appointed as director of UP's Institute for Small Scale Industries and as vice president for planning and development of the entire University of the Philippines System by 1993. He served in those capacities until 2001 and 1999 respectively. The University of the Philippines recognized de la Peña for his distinguished career with an Outstanding Achievement Award in 1999.

De la Peña was a trustee of UP Engineering Research and Development Foundation and also served as president of the UP Alumni Engineers.

=== Department of Science and Technology ===
De la Peña began work in the executive department at about the same time he was a part-time professor at UP Diliman. He was the head of its Planning Service from 1982 to 1984 and was appointed as the director of Technology Application and Promotion Institute from 1989 to 1991. He is credited with playing a key role in the creation and implementation of several government programs such as the Technology Business Incubation (TBI) program and the Manufacturing Productivity Extension (MPEX) program which has been supporting small enterprises since 1991.

In 2001, de la Peña assumed the post of Undersecretary for Scientific and Technological Services of the DOST under the secretaryship of Estrella F. Alabastro. He also became the longest serving president of the National Research Council of the Philippines from 2002 to 2007. During his 13 years as Undersecretary, he implemented several key information technology and e-commerce programs prior to the creation of the Commission on Information and Communications Technology. They include the e-Government Program of the DOST and the Philippine e-Library Project for which he received the highest civil service award in the Philippines in 2005.

De la Peña served in the Congressional Commission on Science, Technology and Engineering (COMSTE) as executive director in 2008. He also helped organize the National Innovation Network (Filipinnovation) and served as its co-chairman in 2008. In 2011, he was elected chairman of the United Nations Commission on Science and Technology for Development (UNCSTD).

De la Peña has also served as president of the Philippine Institute for Chemical Engineers and the Association of Management and Industrial Engineers of the Philippines. He also headed the Small Enterprises Research and Development Foundation, and NEC Foundation. He is also a former director of Entrepinoy Volunteers Foundation and Philippine Technology Development Ventures. As head of the Learning from Information and Communication Technology for Development (ICT4D) Research to Enhance Policymaking in the Philippines project of the DOST and International Development Research Centre, he co-edited and published the book entitled Philippine Experiences in ICT4D.

== Personal life ==
De la Peña is married to Mariquit Tablan Banzon, with whom he has five children: Margarita, a medical doctor; Emil, a veterinary doctor; Fortunato Jr., an assistant professor of industrial design; Miguel, an artist, musician and entrepreneur; and Federico, an engineering geologist.

Political offices
Preceded by Mario Montejo	Secretary of Science and Technology; 2016–2022	Succeeded by Renato Solidum Jr.
