= William Padolina =

Filipino chemist

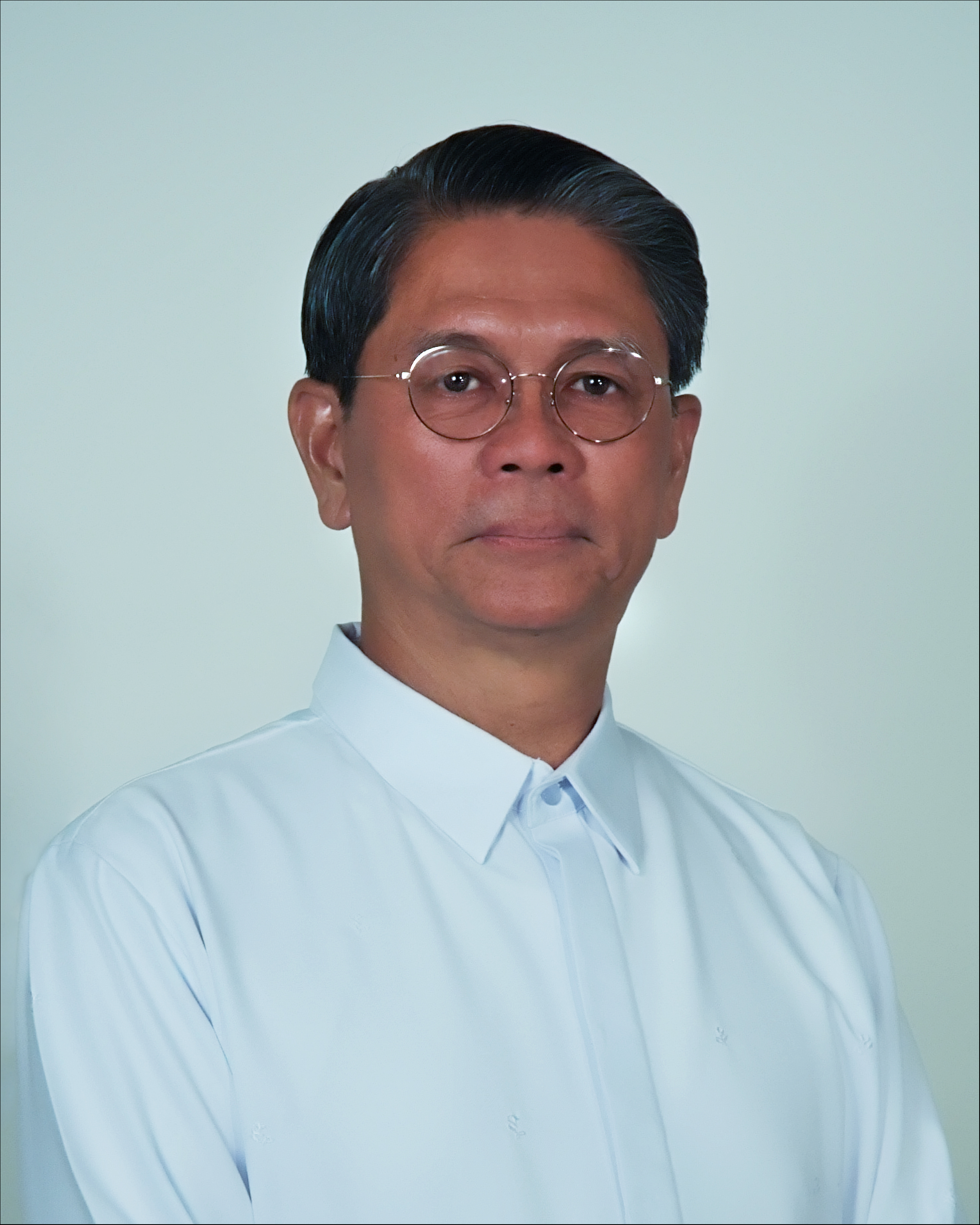

Secretary of Science and Technology
- In office July 7, 1994 – January 29, 1999
- President: Fidel Ramos; Joseph Estrada
- Preceded by: Ricardo Gloria
- Succeeded by: Filemon Uriarte Jr.

Personal details
- Born: William Gonzales Padolina; November 15, 1946 (age 79) Pasay, Rizal, Philippines

William Gonzales Padolina (born November 15, 1946) is a Filipino chemist who served as Secretary of the Department of Science and Technology of the Philippines.

== Early life and education ==
William Gonzales Padolina was born on November 15, 1946, in Pasay (then part of Rizal). He graduated with a degree in agricultural chemistry from the University of the Philippines Los Baños in 1968 and a doctorate degree from the University of Texas at Austin in 1973.

== Career ==
Padolina was president of the National Academy of Science and Technology. He is a professor and academician.

He was Secretary of Science and Technology (Philippines) from July 7, 1994, to January 29, 1999.

Padolina's tenure included the PHNET project, which connected the Philippines to the internet, and the Magna Carta for science and technology workers, which increased benefits to discourage leaving for higher-pay abroad.
