= Estrella Alabastro =

Filipino engineer and government administratorn (born 1941)

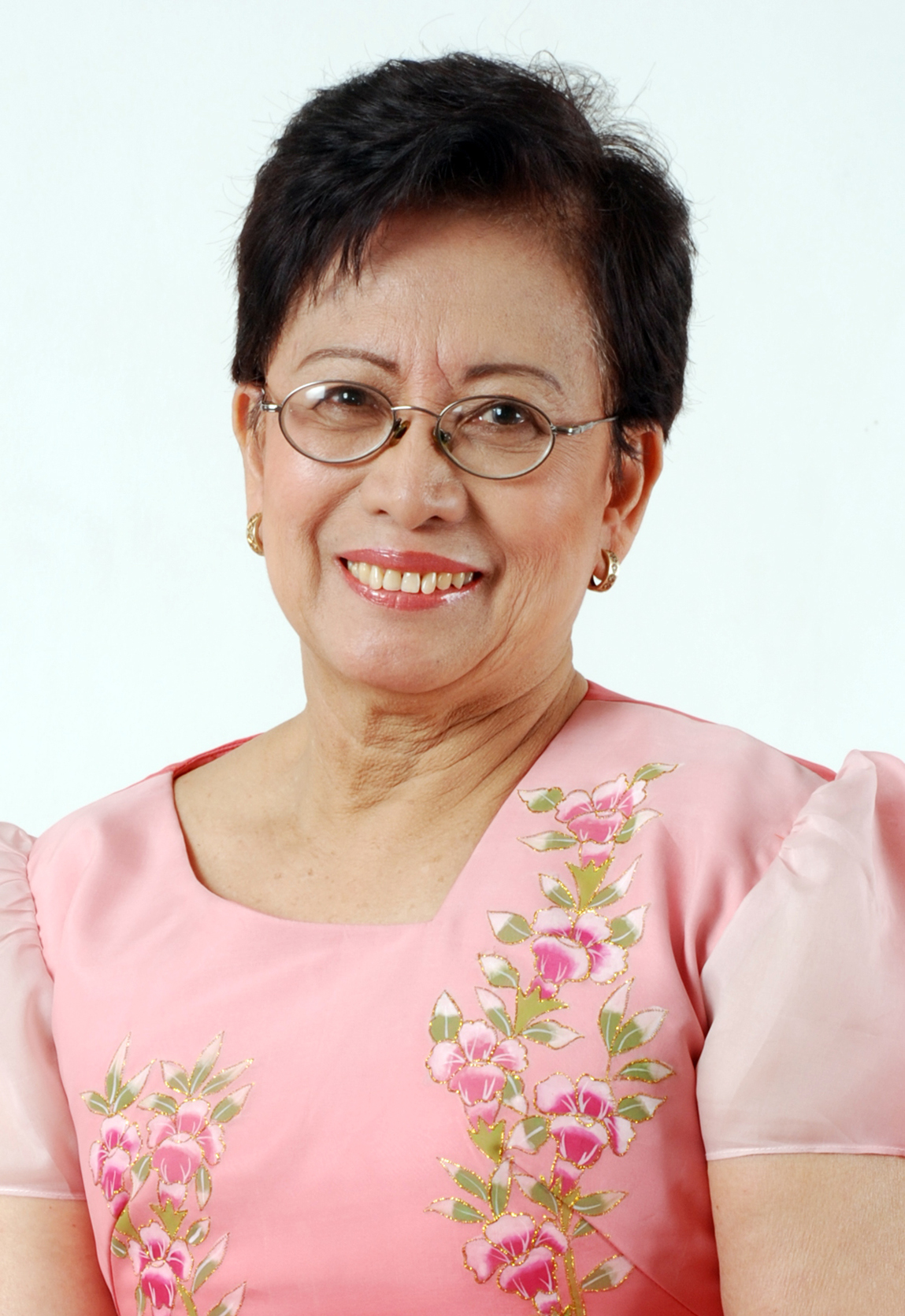

6th Secretary of Science and Technology
- In office March 12, 2001 – June 30, 2010
- President: Gloria Macapagal Arroyo
- Preceded by: Filemon A. Uriarte, Jr.
- Succeeded by: Mario G. Montejo

Personal details
- Born: Estrella Fagela; February 19, 1941 (age 85)
- Spouse: Edgardo Garcia Alabastro
- Children: 3

Estrella Fagela Alabastro (born February 19, 1941) is a Filipino chemical engineer and food scientist who served as the sixth secretary of science and technology from 2001 to 2010 and chaired the ASEAN Committee on Science and Technology in the 1990s. She also served as dean of the College of Home Economics at the University of the Philippines Diliman from 1984 to 1990.

Alabastro is the mother of Representative Stella Quimbo of Marikina's second district.

== Early life and education ==
Estrella Alabastro obtained a BS in chemical engineering from the University of the Philippines Diliman in 1961, and later obtained an MS and PhD in chemical engineering from Rice University.

== Career ==
Alabastro served as dean of the College of Home Economics at the University of the Philippines Diliman (UP Diliman) from 1984 to 1990. She was responsible for the Food Science Doctoral Program at the UP Diliman.

In the 1990s, she served as ASEAN chairwoman of the Committee on Science and Technology (COST).

Alabastro was appointed secretary of science and technology on March 12, 2001, and served until June 30, 2010. She was the first woman to serve as DOST Secretary. She researched thermal processing of Philippine food products and irradiation to extend the shelf life of mangoes. She created the Small Enterprises Technology Upgrading Program, which prolonged tinapa preservation from a week to 6 months.

In 2015, she was named Academician of National Academy of Science and Technology in Chemical Engineering.

== Personal life ==
Alabastro is married to chemical engineer Edgardo "Ed" Garcia Alabastro, a fellow Rice University alumnus who heads the environmental consulting firm Technotrix. They have three children: Stella Luz (born 1969), John Edward, and one other child. Stella is an economist and politician currently serving as representative of Marikina's second district, while John is a computer scientist by profession.

Political offices
| Preceded by Filemon Uriarte Jr. | Secretary of Science and Technology; 2001–2010 | Succeeded by Mario Montejo |
