= Filemon Uriarte Jr. =

Filipino chemical engineer (born 1945)

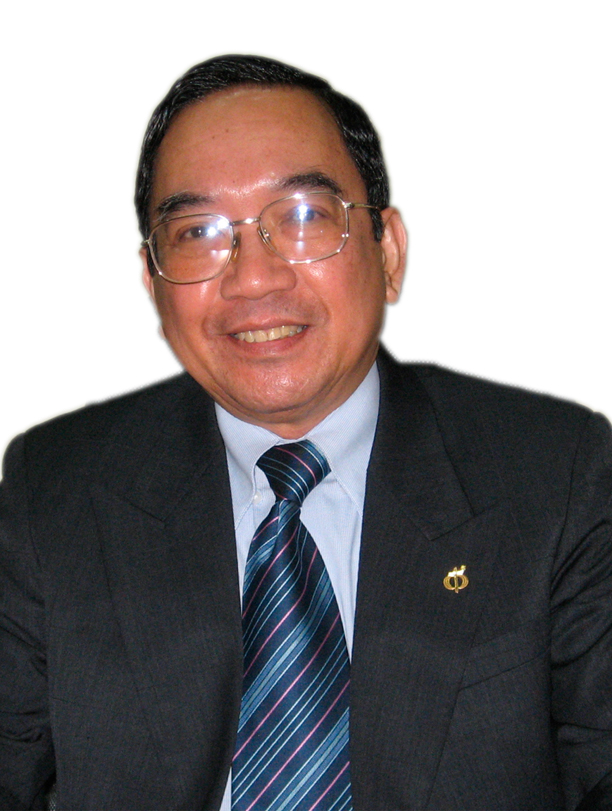

Secretary of Science and Technology
- In office February 1, 1999 – November 2000
- President: Joseph Estrada
- Preceded by: William Padolina
- Succeeded by: Rogelio Panlasigui

Personal details
- Born: Filemon A. Uriarte, Jr. October 15, 1945 (age 80)

Filemon Uriarte Jr. (born October 15, 1945) is a Filipino chemical engineer who served as Secretary of the Department of Science and Technology of the Philippines under Joseph Estrada.

== Education ==
Uriarte completed a B.S. at the University of the Philippines Diliman in 1965 and a Ph.D. at Carnegie Mellon University in 1970.

== Career ==
He served as Secretary of the Department of Science and Technology starting on February 1, 1999 until his resignation in November 2000.

He is an Academician of the National Academy of Science and Technology.
