= Mario Montejo =

Filipino engineer and government administrator

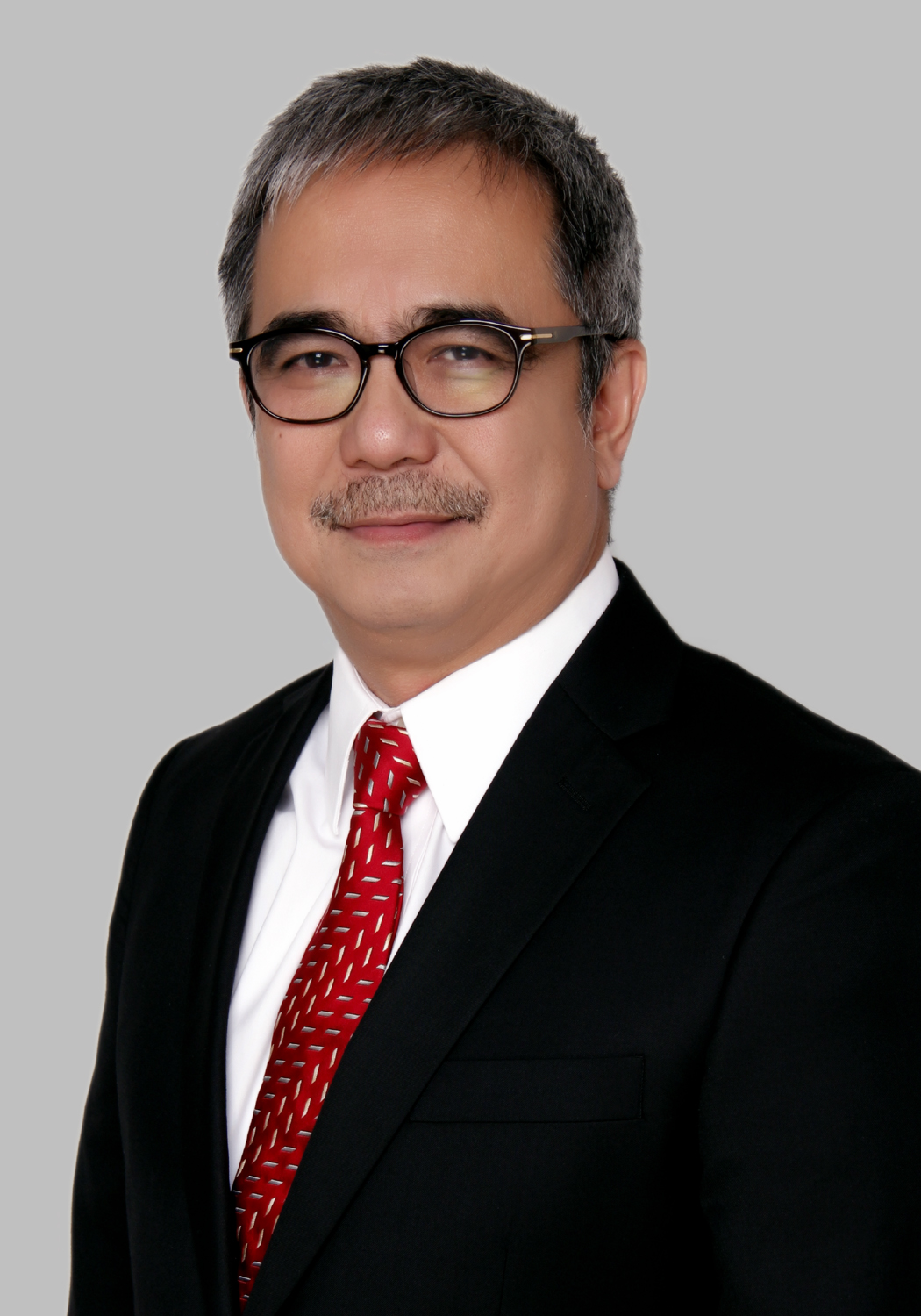

Secretary of Science and Technology
- In office June 30, 2010 – June 30, 2016
- President: Benigno Aquino III
- Preceded by: Estrella Alabastro
- Succeeded by: Fortunato de la Peña

Personal details
- Spouse: Maria Rosario Ochoa-Montejo
- Education: University of the Philippines Diliman (BS)

Mario G. Montejo is a Filipino engineer and government administrator. He served as Secretary of Science and Technology under President Benigno Aquino III. Prior to his appointment as secretary, he was a professor at the College of Engineering of the University of the Philippines Diliman.

== Science and Technology Secretary ==
In describing Montejo during the announcement of his Cabinet appointments to the Science and Technology Department post, President Benigno Aquino III said Montejo's team was responsible for the featured slides and waves at the water amusement park Water Fun using Filipino technology.

Political offices
Preceded by Estrella Alabastro	Secretary of Science and Technology; 2010 – 2016	Succeeded by Fortunato dela Peña
