= List of executive orders by Benigno Aquino III =

Philippine presidents issue executive orders to help officers and agencies of the executive branch manage the operations within the government itself. Listed below are executive orders signed by Philippine President Benigno Aquino III.

== 2010 ==
No.	Title / Description	Date signed	Ref.
1	Creating the Philippine Truth Commission of 2010	July 30, 2010	
2	Recalling, withdrawing, and revoking appointments issued by the previous administration in violation of the constitutional ban on midnight appointments, and for other purposes.	July 30, 2010	
3	An Executive Order revoking Executive Order No. 883 dated 28 May 2010	July 30, 2010	
4	Reorganizing and renaming the Office of the Press Secretary as the Presidential Communications Operations Office; creating the Presidential Communications Development and Strategic Planning Office; and for other purposes.	July 30, 2010	
5	Amending Executive Order No. 594, dated December 20, 2006, regarding the rules governing the appointment/designation and conduct of Special Envoys	August 25, 2010	
6	Extending the duration of the operations of the Presidential Middle East Preparedness Committee (PMEPC) to December 30,2010	September 2, 2010	
7	Directing the rationalization of the compensation and position classification system in the Government-Owned and-Controlled Corporations (GOCCS) and Government Financial Institutions (GFIs), and for other purposes	September 8, 2010	
8	Reorganizing and renaming the Build-Operate and Transfer (BOT) center to the Public-Private Partnership (PPP) Center of the Philippines and transferring its attachment from the Department of Trade and Industry to the National Economic and Development Authority and for other purposes	September 9, 2010	
9	Amending Section 1 of Executive Order No. 67, reorganizing the Presidential Commission on the Visiting Forces Agreement created under Executive Order No. 199, dated January 17, 2000	October 1, 2010	
10	Declaring the 2nd of October 2010 as the Nationwide Philhealth Registration and directing the Department of Health to Lead concerned government agencies to facilitate the Nationwide Philihealth Registration	October 2, 2010	
11	Transferring the National Commission on Indigenous People from the Department of Environment and Natural Resources to the Office of the President of the Philippines	November 8, 2010	
12	Delegating to the Executive Secretary the power to approve compromises or releases of any interest, penalty or civil liability to the Social Security System Pursuant to Section 4 (6) of Republic Act No, 8282 (The Social Security Act of 1997)	November 9, 2010	
13	Abolishing the Presidential Anti-graft Commission and Transferring its investigative, adjudicatory and recommendatory functions to the Office of the Deputy secretary for Legal Affairs, Office of the President	November 15, 2010	
14	Transferring the control and supervision of the Philippine Charity Sweepstakes Office from the Department of Health (DOH) to the Office of the President (OP)	November 19, 2011	
15	Granting Combat Allowance to uniformed members of the Armed Forces of the Philippines who are directly involved in combat operations against members of national security threat groups, thereby repealing Executive Order (E.O) no. 658 dated September 6, 2007	December 20, 2010	
16	Extending further the term of South Cotabato / North Cotabato / Sultan Kudarat / Sarangani / General Santos City (SOCKSARGEN) Area Development Project Office (ADPO) from January 2010 to December 2016. Amending for the purpose EO No. 507, series of 2006	December 21, 2010	
17	Amending Section 3 of Executive Order no. 82, institutionalizing the legacy of the EDSA People Power revolution by creating an EDSA People Power Commission to perpetuate and propagate the spirit of EDSA	December 22, 2010	
18	Rationalizing the organization and supervision of certain agencies, offices and other similar entities attached to or under the Office of the President (OP)	December 9, 2010	
19	Extending the suspension of all allowances, bonuses, incentives and other perks to members of the board of directors or trustees of government-owned and-controlled corporations (GOCCs) and government financial institutions (GFIs) except reasonable per diems.	December 30, 2010	

== 2011 ==
No.	Title / Description	Date signed	Ref.
20	Extending the duration of operation of the Presidential Middle East Preparedness Committee (PMEPC) to June 30, 2011	January 6, 2011	
21	Reducing the rate of import duty on milling (food) wheat to zero under Section 104 of Presidential Decree No. 1464, otherwise known as the Tariff and Customs Code of 1978, as amended, as provided for under Section 3 of Executive Order No. 863, series of 2010	January 14, 2011	
22	Reducing the rates of import duty on cement and cement clinker to zero under Section 104 of Presidential Decree No. 1464, otherwise known as the Tariff and Customs Code of 1978, as amended, as provided for under Section 3 of Executive Order No. 862, series of 2010	January 14, 2011	
23	Declaring a moratorium on the cutting and harvesting of timber in the natural and residual forests and creating the Anti-Illegal Logging Task Force	February 1, 2011	
24	Prescribing rules to govern the compensation of members of the board of directors/trustees in government-owned or controlled corporations including government financial institutions	February 10, 2011	
26	Declaring an interdepartmental convergence initiative for a National Greening Program.	February 24, 2011	
27	Reduction and condonation of real property taxes and interest/penalties assessed on the power generation facilities of independent power producers under build-operate-transfer contracts with government-owned or controlled corporations in the Province of Quezon	February 28, 2011	
28	Reorganizing the Philippine Air Negotiating Panel and the Philippine Air Consultation Panel	March 14, 2011	
29	Authorizing the Civil Aeronautics Board and the Philippine Air Panels to pursue more aggressively the International Civil Aviation Liberalization Policy	March 14, 2011	
30	Transferring the Land Registration Authority (LRA) from the Department of Environment and Natural Resources (DENR) to the Department of Justice (DOJ), repealing for the purpose Executive Order No. 690, series of 2007	March 14, 2011	
31	Directing the Department of Budget and Management to establish a comprehensive database on government manpower for budget management and for other purposes	March 30, 2011	
32	Instituting the Public Transport Assistance Program – Pantawid Pasada	April 1, 2011	
33	Transferring the National Council on Disability Affairs (NCDA) from the Office of the President (OP) to the Department of Social Welfare and Development (DSWD)	April 5, 2011	
34	Creating the Overseas Preparedness and Response Team and replacing the Presidential Middle East Preparedness Committee	April 6, 2011	
35	Transferring the control and supervision of the Philippine Center on Transnational Crime from the Department of the Interior and Local Government to the Office of the President	April 11, 2011	
36	Conveying, assigning and transferring the ownership unto the Technological University of the Philippines (TUP) a portion of land of the private domain identified as lot 9100-b, Mcadm. 590-d, Taguig Cadastral Mapping (Swo-13-000385), situated in Barangay Western Bicutan, Taguig City, Metro Manila, Island of Luzon	April 18, 2011	
37	Returning the administrative supervision over the Securities and Exchange Commission from the Department of Trade and Industry to the Department of Finance	April 19, 2011	
38	Consolidating all presidential issuances relating to the combat duty pay and combat incentive pay of officers and enlisted personnel of the Armed Forces of the Philippines	April 28, 2011	
39	Designating the Anti-terrorism Council as the Philippine National Authority on the Chemical Weapons Convention and other disarmament issues	April 28, 2011	
40	Implementation of the third tranche of the modified salary schedule for civilian personnel and base pay schedule for military and uniformed personnel in the government	April 29, 2011	
41	Reactivating the Presidential Task Force Against Illegal Recruitment created under Executive Order No. 759 (s. 2008) and strengthening the same	April 29, 2011	
42	Providing the Presidential Commission on Good Government with provisional authority to replace directors in sequestered or surrendered corporations.	May 9, 2011	
43	Pursuing our Social Contract with the Filipino People through the reorganization of the Cabinet Clusters	May 13, 2011	
44	Amending Executive Order No. 571 (s. 2006) renaming the Public-Private Sector Task Force on Philippine Competitiveness as the National Competitiveness Council (NCC) and expanding its membership	June 3, 2011	
45	Designating the Department of Justice as the Competition Authority	June 9, 2011	
46	Amending Executive Order No. 8 (s. 1998), as amended, to further strengthen and reorganize the Presidential Anti-Organized Crime Commission	June 13, 2011	
47	Reorganizing, renaming and transferring the Commission on Information and Communications technology and its attached agencies to the Department of Science and Technology, directing the implementation thereof and for other purposes	June 23, 2011	
48	Streamlining the composition of the Board of Trustees of the Millennium Challenge Account-Philippines thereby amending Sections 3 and 4 of Executive Order No. 849 (s. 2009), entitled “Authorizing the organization of the Millennium Challenge Account-Philippines as a subsidiary of the Development Bank of the Philippines Management Corporation to function as the accountable entity or central point of contact for the Millennium Challenge Account Compact Assistance to the Philippines and setting general guidelines therefor”	July 5, 2011	
49	Mandating the implementation of the Memorandum of Agreement dated 04 July 2011, entitled “Towards the Cordillera People Liberation Army's Final Disposition of Arms and Forces and its Transformation into a Potent Socio-Economic and Unarmed Force” and for other purposes	July 19, 2011	
50	Abolition of the Presidential Task Force on Mindanao River Basin Rehabilitation and Development and transferring its functions to regular government agencies	July 28, 2011	
51	Creating a Screening Committee to screen and recommend to the President persons who will be appointed as Officers-in-Charge for the Office of the Regional Governor, Regional Vice Governor and Members of the Regional Legislative Assembly in the Autonomous Region in Muslim Mindanao	July 28, 2011	
52	Temporary waiver of the reciprocal tariff treatment on certain articles to implement the agreement between the Republic of the Philippines and the Republic of Korea on the compensatory measure in relation to the delayed implementation of Philippine Tariff Concessions under the Agreement on Trade in Goods under the Framework Agreement on Comprehensive Economic Cooperation Among the Governments of the Member Countries of the Association of Southeast Asian Nations and the Republic of Korea	August 5, 2011	
53	Strengthening the Committee for the Special Protection of Children, amending for this purpose Executive Order No. 275 (s. 1995)	August 11, 2011	
54	Transferring the PITC Pharma, Inc. to the Department of Trade and Industry from the Department of Health for policy and program coordination and for other purposes	September 6, 2011	
55	Directing the integration and automation of Government Financial Management Systems	September 6, 2011	
56	Authorizing the Secretary of Finance to order the opening of income tax returns of specific taxpayers for inspection to effectively implement Republic Act Number 10021, otherwise known as the “Exchange of Information on Tax Matters Act of 2009”	September 6, 2011	
57	Establishing a National Coast Watch System, providing for its structure and defining the roles and responsibilities of member agencies in providing coordinated inter-agency maritime security operations and for other purposes	September 6, 2011	
58	Mandating the transfer of Nayong Pilipino Foundation's Pasay property to the Manila International Airport Authority	September 29, 2011	
59	Providing for the amendment of Executive Order (EO) No. 309 (s. 2004) for the inclusion of other grains in the coverage of the Philippine Rice Postproduction Consortium (PRPC) and changing of the name of PRPC into “Philippine Grains Postproduction Consortium”	September 30, 2011	
60	Amending Executive Order (EO) No. 254 (s. 1995) and reorganizing the Philippine Gas Project Task Force to the Philippine Upstream Petroleum Task Force	September 30, 2011	
61	Modifying the nomenclature and the rates of import duty on various products under Section 104 of the Tariff and Customs Code of 1978 (Presidential Decree No. 1464), as amended	October 17, 2011	
62	Transferring the Local Water Utilities Administration (LWUA) from the Department of Health to the Department of Public Works and Highways (DPWH)	October 26, 2011	
64	Transferring the Clark International Airport Corporation (CIAC) from the Office of the President to the Department of Transportation and Communications (DOTC), making CIAC an agency attached to the DOTC, and further transferring the shares of stock of CIAC	December 21, 2011	

== 2012 ==
No.	Title / Description	Date signed	Ref.
65	Prescribing rules to govern the compensation of members of the Board of Directors of Local Water Districts pursuant to Section 5 of Executive Order No. 24 (s. 2011)	January 2, 2012	
66	Prescribing rules on the cancellation or suspension of classes and work in government offices due to typhoons, flooding, other weather disturbances, and calamities	January 9, 2012	
67	Providing for the establishment of the Integrated Transport System	February 21, 2012	
68	Monetization Program of outstanding Value-Added Tax (VAT) Tax Credit Certificates (TCCs)	March 27, 2012	
69	Strengthening the Presidential Commission for the Urban Poor	March 29, 2012	
70	Reducing the rates of duty on capital equipment, spare parts and accessories imported by Board of Investments (BOI)-registered new and expanding enterprises	March 29, 2012	
71	Modifying the rates of duty on certain imported articles as provided for under the Tariff and Customs Code of the Philippines (TCCP), as amended, in order to implement the Philippine Tariff Commitments on Certain Products included in the Highly Sensitive List under the Association of Southeast ASEAN Nations (ASEAN) – China Free Trade Area (ACFTA)	April 16, 2012	
72	Modifying the rates of duty on certain imported articles as provided for under the Tariff and Customs Code of the Philippines (TCCP), as amended, in order to implement the Philippine Tariff Commitments on Certain Products included in the Sensitive List and the transfer of certain tariff lines from the sensitive track to the normal track under the Association of Southeast Asian Nations (ASEAN) – China Free Trade Area (ACFTA)	April 16, 2012	
73	Modifying the rates of duty on certain imported articles as provided for under the Tariff and Customs Code of the Philippines (TCCP), as amended, in order to implement the Philippine Tariff Commitments on Certain Products included in the Highly Sensitive List under the Association of Southeast ASEAN Nations (ASEAN) – Korea Free Trade Area (AKFTA)	April 16, 2012	
74	Modifying the rates of duty on certain imported articles as provided for under the Tariff and Customs Code of the Philippines (TCCP), as amended, in order to implement the Philippine Tariff commitments on certain products included in the sensitive list and the transfer of certain tariff lines from the sensitive track to the normal track under the Association of Southeast Asian Nations (ASEAN) – Korea Free Trade Area (AKFTA).	April 16, 2012	
75	Designating the Department of Transportation and Communications (DOTC), through the Maritime Industry Authority, as the single administration in the Philippines responsible for oversight in the implementation of the 1978 International Convention on Standards of Training, Certification and Watchkeeping for seafarers, as amended.	April 30, 2012	
76	Implementation of the fourth tranche of the modified salary schedule for civilian personnel and base pay schedule for military and uniformed personnel in the government.	April 30, 2012	
77	Amending Executive Order (EO) No. 637 (s. 2007), on the basis of the computation of the incentives of personnel affected by the implementation of the rationalization program under EO No. 366 (s. 2004)	May 8, 2012	
78	Mandating the inclusion of provisions on the use of alternative dispute resolution mechanisms in all contracts involving Public-Private Partnership projects, Build-Operate and Transfer projects, Joint Venture Agreements between the government and private entities and those entered into by Local Government Units.	July 4, 2012	
79	Institutionalizing and implementing reforms in the Philippine Mining Sector providing policies and guidelines to ensure environmental protection and responsible mining in the utilization of mineral resources.	July 6, 2012	
80	Directing the adoption of a Performance-Based Incentive system for government employees.	July 20, 2012	
81	Creating the Mindanao Power Monitoring Committee	July 30, 2012	
82	Operationalizing the practical guide for National Crisis Managers and the National Crisis Management Core Manual; establishing National and Local Crisis Management Organizations; and providing funds therefor.	September 4, 2012	
83	Institutionalization of the Philippine Qualifications Framework.	October 1, 2012	
84	Declaring and delineating the Dingalan Port Zone and placing it under the Administrative Jurisdiction of the Philippine Ports Authority (PPA).	October 1, 2012	
85	Declaring and delineating the Himamaylan Port Zone and placing it under the administrative jurisdiction of the Philippine Ports Authority (PPA).	October 1, 2012	
86	Declaring and delineating the Hinigaran Port Zone and placing it under the administrative jurisdiction of the Philippine Ports Authority (PPA).	October 1, 2012	
87	Declaring and delineating the Clarin Port Zone and placing it under the administrative jurisdiction of the Philippine Ports Authority (PPA).	October 1, 2012	
88	Declaring and delineating the Jagna Port Zone and placing it under the administrative jurisdiction of the Philippine Ports Authority (PPA).	October 1, 2012	
90	Declaring and delineating the Talibon Port Zone under the administrative jurisdiction of the Philippine Ports Authority.	October 1, 2012	
91	Declaring and delineating the Tapal Port Zone and placing it under the administrative jurisdiction of the Philippine Ports Authority (PPA).	October 1, 2012	
92	Declaring and delineating the Liloan Port Zone and placing it under the administrative jurisdiction of the Philippine Ports Authority (PPA).	October 1, 2012	
93	Declaring and delineating the Balingoan Port Zone and placing it under the administrative jurisdiction of the Philippine Ports Authority (PPA).	October 1, 2012	
94	Declaring and delineating the Balbagon Port Zone and placing it under the administrative jurisdiction of the Philippine Ports Authority (PPA).	October 1, 2012	
95	Declaring and delineating the new San Jose (Caminawit) port zone and placing it under the administrative jurisdiction of the Philippine Ports Authority (PPA).	October 1, 2012	
96	Declaring and delineating the Guimbal Port Zone and placing it under the administrative jurisdiction of the Philippine Ports Authority (PPA).	October 1, 2012	
97	Revoking Executive Order No. 523 (s. 2006) and conferring upon the office for alternative dispute resolution the management, development, coordination, and oversight of alternative dispute resolution programs in the executive department, and for other purposes.	October 18, 2012	
98	Promulgating the Ninth Regular Foreign Investment Negative List.	October 29, 2012	
99	Reconstituting the Office of the Cabinet Secretariat, renaming it as the Office of the Cabinet Secretary, defining its powers and functions, providing for its support staff and for other purposes.	October 31, 2012	
100	Declaring and delineating the Currimao Port Zone and placing it under the administrative jurisdiction of the Philippine Ports Authority (PPA).	December 4, 2012	
101	Declaring and delineating the Capinpin Port Zone and placing it under the administrative jurisdiction of the Philippine Ports Authority (PPA).	December 4, 2012	
102	Declaring and delineating the Cawayan Port Zone and placing it under the administrative jurisdiction of the Philippine Ports Authority (PPA).	December 4, 2012	
103	Declaring and delineating the Danao (Escalante) Port Zone and placing it under the administrative jurisdiction of the Philippine Ports Authority (PPA).	December 4, 2012	
104	Declaring and delineating the Ubay Port Zone and placing it under the administrative jurisdiction of the Philippine Ports Authority (PPA)	December 4, 2012	
105	Declaring and delineating the Calubian Port Zone and placing it under the administrative jurisdiction of the Philippine Ports Authority (PPA)	December 4, 2012	
106	Further Expanding the Delineated Benoni Port Zone	December 4, 2012	
107	Declaring and delineating the Kolambugan Port Zone and placing it under the administrative jurisdiction of the Philippine Ports Authority (PPA)	December 4, 2012	
108	Declaring and delineating the Tubod Port Zone and placing it under the administrative jurisdiction of the Philippine Ports Authority (PPA)	December 4, 2012	
109	Declaring and delineating the Aras-asan Port Zone and placing it under the administrative jurisdiction of the Philippine Ports Authority (PPA)	December 4, 2012	
110	Declaring and delineating the Cantilan Port Zone and placing it under the administrative jurisdiction of the Philippine Ports Authority (PPA)	December 4, 2012	
111	Declaring and delineating the Dapitan (Pulauan) Port Zone and placing it under the administrative jurisdiction of the Philippine Ports Authority (PPA)	December 4, 2012	
112	Declaring and delineating the Sindangan Port Zone and placing it under the administrative jurisdiction of the Philippine Ports Authority (PPA)	December 4, 2012	
113	Declaring and delineating the Maco Port Zone and placing it under the administrative jurisdiction of the Philippine Ports Authority (PPA)	December 4, 2012	
114	Declaring and delineating the General Santos Port Zone and placing it under the administrative jurisdiction of the Philippine Ports Authority (PPA)	December 4, 2012	
115	Declaring and delineating the Cotabato Port Zone and placing it under the administrative jurisdiction of the Philippine Ports Authority (PPA)	December 4, 2012	
116	Declaring and delineating the Kalamansig Port Zone and placing it under the administrative jurisdiction of the Philippine Ports Authority (PPA)	December 4, 2012	
117	Declaring and delineating the Tubigon Port Zone and placing it under the administrative jurisdiction of the Philippine Ports Authority (PPA)	December 4, 2012	
118	Declaring and delineating the Guinsiliban Port Zone and placing it under the administrative jurisdiction of the Philippine Ports Authority (PPA)	December 4, 2012	
119	Declaring and delineating the Dapa Port Zone and placing it under the administrative jurisdiction of the Philippine Ports Authority (PPA)	December 4, 2012	
120	Constituting the transition commission and for other purposes	December 17, 2012	
121	Declaring and delineating the Agutaya Port Zone and placing it under the administrative jurisdiction of the Philippine Ports Authority (PPA)	December 21, 2012	
122	Declaring and delineating the Balabac Port Zone and placing it under the administrative jurisdiction of the Philippine Ports Authority (PPA)	December 21, 2012	
123	Declaring and delineating the Rizal Port Zone and placing it under the administrative jurisdiction of the Philippine Ports Authority (PPA)	December 21, 2012	
124	Declaring and delineating the Taytay (Santa Cruz) Port Zone and placing it under the administrative jurisdiction of the Philippine Ports Authority (PPA)	December 21, 2012	
125	Declaring and delineating the Glan Port Zone and placing it under the administrative jurisdiction of the Philippine Ports Authority (PPA)	December 21, 2012	

== 2013 ==
No.	Title / Description	Date signed	Ref.
126	Repealing Executive Order No. 855 (s.2010) and authorizing the implementation of the equity value buyout of the Metro Rail Transit Corporation and prescribing guidelines therefor	February 28, 2013	
127	Declaring and delineating the Bacacay Port Zone and placing it under the administrative jurisdiction of the Philippine Ports Authority (PPA)	March 14, 2013	
128	Declaring and delineating the San Jose Port Zone and placing it under the administrative jurisdiction of the Philippine Ports Authority (PPA)	March 14, 2013	
129	Declaring and delineating the Calbayog Port Zone and placing it under the administrative jurisdiction of the Philippine Ports Authority (PPA)	March 14, 2013	
130	Declaring and delineating the Catbalogan Port Zone and placing it under the administrative jurisdiction of the Philippine Ports Authority (PPA)	March 14, 2013	
131	Declaring and delineating the Borongan Port Zone and placing it under the administrative jurisdiction of the Philippine Ports Authority (PPA)	March 14, 2013	
132	Declaring and delineating the Iligan Port Zone and placing it under the administrative jurisdiction of the Philippine Ports Authority (PPA)	March 14, 2013	
133	Repealing Executive Order No. 686 (s. 2007) and returning to the Toll Regulatory Board (TRB) the powers transferred to the Department of Public Works and Highways (DPWH)	March 26, 2013	
134	Granting of Carer's Allowance to Employees’ Compensation (EC) Permanent Partial Disability (PPD) and Permanent Total Disability (PTD) pensioners in the public sector	April 23, 2013	
135	Increasing the amount of employment compensation benefits for employees in the public sector	April 23, 2013	
136	Amending certain sections of Executive Order No. 8 (s. 2010) which reorganized and renamed the Build-Operate and Transfer Center to the Public-Private Partnership Center of the Philippines and transferred its attachment from the Department of Trade and Industry to the National Economic and Development Authority, and for other purposes	May 28, 2013	
137	The Mindanao Modular Generator Sets (Gensets) Program	July 12, 2013	
138	Amending Executive Order (EO) No. 56 (s. 2001) Adopting the Comprehensive Program Framework for children in armed conflict, strengthening the Council for the Welfare of Children (CWC) and for other purposes	August 2, 2013	
139	Creating an Office of the Revenue Agency Modernization (ORAM) in the Department of Finance (DOF)	September 2, 2013	
140	Creating a Customs Policy Research Office (CPRO) in the Department of Finance (DOF)	September 2, 2013	
141	Transferring the Philippine National Construction Corporation (PNCC) from the Department of Trade and Industry (DTI) to the Office of the President (OP)	October 14, 2013	
142	Implementing the Memorandum of Understanding (MOU) among the Governments of the participating Member States of the Association of Southeast Asian Nations (ASEAN) on the Second Pilot Project for the Implementation of a Regional Self-Certification System (“Second Pilot Project”)	October 14, 2013	
143	Declaring and delineating the Baybay Port Zone and placing it under the administrative jurisdiction of the Philippine Ports Authority (PPA)	November 5, 2013	
144	Declaring and delineating the Palompon Port Zone and placing it under the administrative jurisdiction of the Philippine Ports Authority (PPA)	November 5, 2013	
145	Declaring and delineating the San Isidro Port Zone and placing it under the administrative jurisdiction of the Philippine Ports Authority (PPA)	November 5, 2013	
146	Delegating to the National Economic and Development Authority Board the power of the President to approve reclamation projects	November 13, 2013	
147	Creating the Philippine Extractive Industries Transparency Initiative	November 26, 2013	
148	Amending Section 1 of Executive Order No. 214 (s. 2003) and imposing the applicable tariff rates under the ASEAN Trade in Goods Agreement on qualified imports from Special Economic and/or Freeport Zones	November 26, 2013	
149	Declaring and delineating the Plaridel Port Zone and placing it under the administrative jurisdiction of the Philippine Ports Authority (PPA)	November 26, 2013	
150	Declaring and delineating the Buenavista Port Zone and placing it under the administrative jurisdiction of the Philippine Ports Authority (PPA)	December 6, 2013	
151	Declaring and delineating the Libertad Port Zone and placing it under the administrative jurisdiction of the Philippine Ports Authority (PPA)	December 6, 2013	
152	Declaring and delineating the Butuan Port Zone and placing it under the administrative jurisdiction of the Philippine Ports Authority (PPA)	December 6, 2013	
153	Declaring and delineating the Masao Port Zone and placing it under the administrative jurisdiction of the Philippine Ports Authority (PPA)	December 6, 2013	
154	Adopting a national plan of action to prevent, deter, and eliminate illegal, unreported, and unregulated fishing, and for other purposes	December 6, 2013	
155	Amending Executive Order No. 160 (s. 2003), and for other purposes	December 18, 2013	
156	Amending Executive Order No. 461 (s. 2005) and adjusting the overseas, living quarters, representation, and family allowances of foreign service personnel.	December 23, 2013	

== 2014 ==
No.	Title / Description	Date signed	Ref.
68-A	Amending Executive Order No. 68 (s. 2012) which established the monetization program of outstanding Value-Added Tax Tax Credit Certificates.	January 13, 2014	
157	Modifying the rates of import duty on certain imported articles as provided for under the Tariff and Customs Code of the Philippines, as amended, in order to implement the amended tariff reduction schedule on motor vehicles’ components, parts and/or accessories under Executive Order No. 767 pursuant to the Agreement Between the Republic of the Philippines and Japan for an Economic Partnership.	February 13, 2014	
158	Declaring and delineating the Roxas Port zone and placing it under the administrative jurisdiction of the Philippine Ports Authority (PPA).	February 14, 2014	
159	Declaring and delineating the Bulalacao Port zone and placing it under the administrative jurisdiction of the Philippine Ports Authority (PPA).	February 14, 2014	
160	Declaring and delineating the Lipata Port zone and placing it under the administrative jurisdiction of the Philippine Ports Authority (PPA).	February 14, 2014	
161	Declaring and delineating the Caluya Port zone and placing it under the administrative jurisdiction of the Philippine Ports Authority (PPA).	February 14, 2014	
162	Declaring and delineating the San Jose Port zone and placing it under the administrative jurisdiction of the Philippine Ports Authority (PPA).	February 14, 2014	
163	Declaring and delineating the Tandag Port zone and placing it under the administrative jurisdiction of the Philippine Ports Authority (PPA).	February 14, 2014	
164	Declaring and delineating the Lianga Port zone and placing it under the administrative jurisdiction of the Philippine Ports Authority (PPA).	February 14, 2014	
165	Transferring the National Food Authority, National Irrigation Administration, Philippine Coconut Authority, and Fertilizer and Pesticide Authority to the Office of the President	May 5, 2014	
166	Designating the Presidential Assistant for Food Security and Agricultural Modernization as Chairman of Certain Governing Bodies	May 20, 2014	
167	Increasing the amount of certain Employment Compensation Benefits for employees in the private and public sectors.	May 26, 2014	
168	Creating the Inter-Agency Task Force for the management of Emerging Infectious Diseases in the Philippines.	May 26, 2014	
169	Establishing emergency measures to control and manage the spread and damage of Aspidiotus Rigidus in the Philippines and designating the Philippine Coconut Authority as the lead agency for the purpose	June 5, 2014	
170	Amending Executive Order Nos. 385 (s. 1989) and 431 (s. 1990) and segregating portions of the Batangas Port Zone under the administrative jurisdiction of the Philippine Ports Authority for energy projects designated by the Department of Energy.	July 25, 2014	
171	“Creating an inter-agency committee to oversee the review, implementation and monitoring of the united nations convention against corruption (UNCAC).”	September 5, 2014	
172	Declaring the port of Batangas and Subic Bay Freeport as extensions of the Port of Manila (MICT/SOUTH HARBOR) during port congestion and other emergency cases	September 13, 2014	
173	Reduction and condonation of real property taxes and interest/penalties assessed on the power generation facilities of Independent Power Producers under Build-Operate-Transfer contracts with Government-Owned and/or -Controlled Corporations	October 31, 2014	
174	Institutionalizing the Philippine Greenhouse Gas Inventory Management and Reporting System	November 24, 2014	
175	Renaming, reorganizing and expanding the mandate of the Presidential Commission on the Visiting Forces Agreement thereby amending Executive Order No. 199 (s. 2000)	November 24, 2014	
176	Institutionalizing the Integrity Management Program (IMP) as the National Corruption Prevention Program in all Government Departments, Bureaus, Offices, Agencies, including Government-Owned and -Controlled Corporations, Government Financial Institutions, State Universities and Colleges, and Local Government Units through the establishment of Integrity Management Systems (IMS)	December 1, 2014	

== 2015 ==
No.	Title / Description	Date signed	Ref.
177	Designating the National Economic and Development Authority Director-General as an Ex-Officio member of the National Food Authority Council	February 10, 2015	
178	Adjusting the Dividend Rate of the Food Terminal, Inc. for its 2012 net earnings pursuant to Section 5 of Republic Act No. 7656	February 18, 2015	
179	Providing the administrative guidelines for the inventory and privatization of Coco Levy Assets	March 18, 2015	
180	Providing the administrative guidelines for the reconveyance and utilization of Coco Levy Assets for the benefit of the coconut farmers and the development of the coconut industry, and for other purposes	March 18, 2015	
181	Implementation of the Provisions of the FY 2015 General Appropriations Act (GAA) on the Grant of the FY 2015 Productivity Enhancement Incentive (PEI) to Government Employees	May 15, 2015	
182	Providing for a Comprehensive Automotive Resurgence Strategy Program	May 29, 2015	
183	Creating a Negros Island Region and for Other Purposes	May 29, 2015	
184	Promulgating the Tenth Regular Foreign Investment Negative List	May 29, 2015	
185	Modifying the Nomenclature and Rates of Duty on Certain Imported Articles as Provided for Under the Tariff and Customs Code of the Philippines, as Amended, in Order to Implement the Philippine Tariff Commitments on Certain Products Included in the Environmental Goods List Under the Asia-Pacific Economic Cooperation	June 26, 2015	
186	Transferring the Jurisdiction, Control, Administration and Management of the Watershed Areas of Geothermal Reservations Vested in the Philippine National Oil Company Pursuant to Executive Order No. 223 (S. 1987) and Proclamation No. 853 (S. 1992)	July 8, 2015	
187	Amending Executive Order No. 120 (s. 2012) Constituting the Bangsamoro Transition Commission and for Other Purposes	August 20, 2015	
188	Imposing a Ten Percent (10%) Across-the-Board Increase in employees’ compensation pension for employees in the public sector	September 11, 2015	
189	Creating the National Cybersecurity Inter-Agency Committee	September 17, 2015	
190	Modifying The Most-Favoured-Nation (MFN) Rates Of Duty On Certain Agricultural Products Under The Tariff And Customs Code Of The Philippines (TCCP), As Amended, In Order To Implement The Philippine Tariff Commitments Under The World Trade Organization Decision On Waiver Relating To Special Treatment For Rice Of The Philippines	November 5, 2015	
191	Modifying the rates of duty on certain agricultural products under Executive Order No. 851 (s. 2009) in order to implement the Philippines’ Asean-Australia-New Zealand Free Trade Area (AANZFTA) tariff commitments relating to the World Trade Organization (WTO) decision on waiver relating to special treatment for rice of the philippines	November 15, 2015	
192	Transferring The Regulation And Supervision Over Health Maintenance Organizations From The Department Of Health To The Insurance Commission, Directing The Implementation Thereof And For Other Purposes	November 12, 2015	
193	Expanding The Coverage Of The National Greening Program	November 12, 2015	

== 2016 ==
No.	Title / Description	Date signed	Ref.
194	Declaring and delineating the Roxas Port Zone and placing it under the Administrative Jurisdiction of the Philippine Ports Authority (PPA)	January 22, 2016	
195	Declaring and delineating the Liminangcong Port Zone and placing it under the Administrative Jurisdiction of the Philippine Ports Authority (PPA)	January 22, 2016	
196	Declaring and delineating the Narra Port Zone and placing it under the Administrative Jurisdiction of the Philippine Ports Authority (PPA)	January 22, 2016	
197	Designating the Secretary of Transportation and Communication as the Authority Responsible for the Security of the Sea Transport and Maritime Infrastructure in the country and for other purposes	February 4, 2016	
198	Approving the Merger of the Development Bank of the Philippines and the Land Bank of the Philippines	February 4, 2016	
200	Declaring and Delineating the Ormoc Port Zone and placing it under the Administrative Jurisdiction of Philippine Ports Authority (PPA).	February 11, 2016	
201	Modifying the Salary Schedule for Civilian Government Personnel and Authorizing the Grant of Additional Benefits for Both Civilian and Military and Uniformed Personnel	February 19, 2016	
202	Creation of an inter-agency technical committee relative to the Laguna Lakeshore Expressway Dike Project	March 22, 2016	
203	Adopting a compensation and position classification system (CPCS) and a general index of occupational services (IOS) for the GOCC sector.	March 22, 2016	
204	Expanding the coverage of Executive Order No. 170 (s. 2003) and EO No. 170-A (s. 2003) to include container-chassis Roll-on-Roll-off (Cha-Ro)	March 29, 2016	
205	Revoking Executive Order No. 427 (s. 2005) and Returning the Infrastructure Facilities covered therein to the Department of Public Works and Highways for purposes of Repair, Maintenance and Management	April 8, 2016	
206	Adopting the policy on ensuring sustainable renewable energy resource management and mandating the Department of Energy (DOE) to lead in its implementation	May 20, 2016	
