= 2010 State of the Nation Address (Philippines) =

Speech by Philippine President Benigno Aquino III

First State of the Nation Address of President Benigno Aquino III
- Full video of the speech as published by Radio Television Malacañang
- Date: July 26, 2010
- Duration: 40 minutes
- Venue: Session Hall, Batasang Pambansa Complex
- Location: Quezon City, Philippines; 14°41′36″N 121°5′40″E
- Filmed by: Radio Television Malacañang
- Participants: Benigno Aquino III; Juan Ponce Enrile; Feliciano Belmonte Jr.
- Language: Filipino
- Previous: 2009 State of the Nation Address
- Next: 2011 State of the Nation Address

The 2010 State of the Nation Address was the first State of the Nation Address (SONA) delivered by Benigno Aquino III, the 15th president of the Philippines, on July 26, 2010, at the Batasang Pambansa Complex. The SONA was the first to be delivered in Filipino language.

== Seating and guests ==
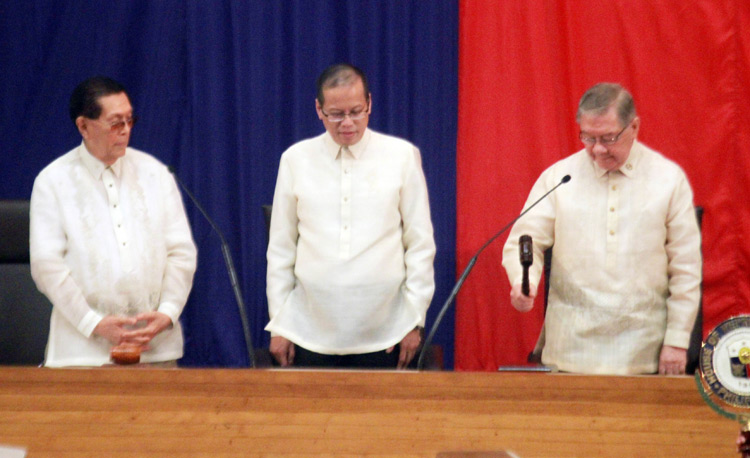
President Benigno Aquino III (center) with Senate president Juan Ponce Enrile (left) and House speaker Feliciano Belmonte Jr. as the 2010 State of the Nation Address.

Two former presidents of the Philippines, Joseph Estrada and Fidel V. Ramos, were among the attendees of the SONA. Among those who also attended were Vice President Jejomar Binay, Chief Justice Renato Corona, and Papal Nuncio and Head of the Diplomatic Corps, Edward Joseph Adams. Former President and Aquino's predecessor, incumbent Pampanga 2nd District Representative Gloria Macapagal-Arroyo, skipped the event.

== Address content and delivery ==
In his speech, Aquino revealed the problems he encountered upon assuming the presidency.

Preceded by 2009 State of the Nation Address	State of the Nation Address; 2010	Succeeded by 2011 State of the Nation Address
