= 2015 in the Philippines =

- Decades: 1990s; 2000s; 2010s; 2020s
- See also: List of years in the Philippines; films; music; television; sports

2015 in the Philippines details events of note that happened in the Philippines in 2015. International events that are connected, or concerned with the Philippines are also included in this significant and important article.

The year was designated by the Department of Tourism as Visit the Philippines Year.

== Incumbents ==
Benigno S.
Aquino III

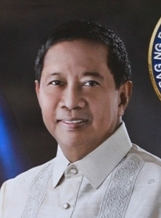
Jejomar C.
Binay Sr.

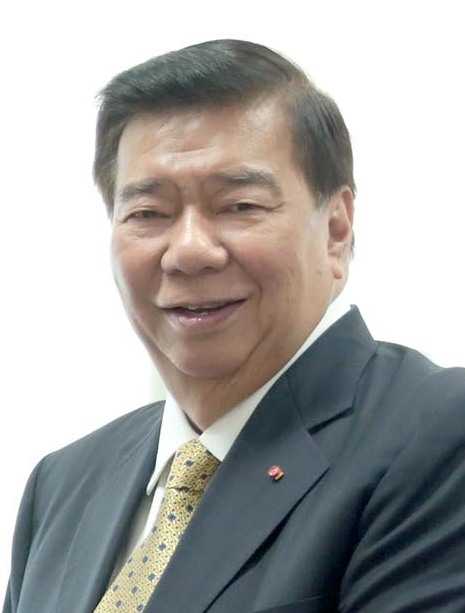
Franklin M.
Drilon

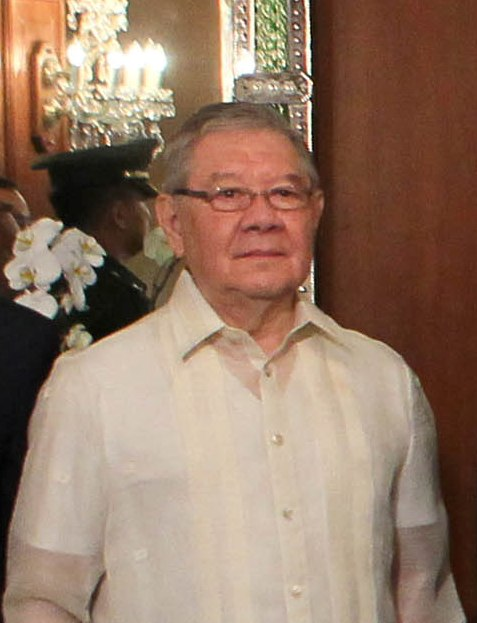
Feliciano R.
Belmonte Jr.

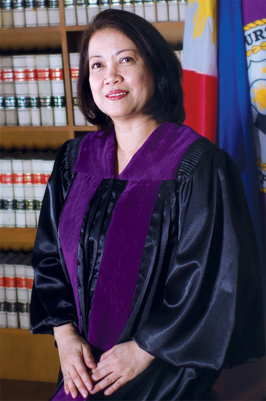
Maria Lourdes
P.A. Sereno

- President: Benigno S. Aquino III (Liberal)
- Vice President: Jejomar C. Binay Sr. (UNA)
- Congress (16th):
  - Senate President: Franklin M. Drilon (Liberal)
  - House Speaker: Feliciano R. Belmonte Jr. (Liberal)
- Chief Justice: Maria Lourdes P.A. Sereno

== Events ==
=== January ===
- January 6 – Importer Lilia Cruz also known as Leah Cruz, Bureau of Plant Industry Director Clarito Barron, and 119 other persons are charged by the National Bureau of Investigation of direct bribery and violation of the Republic Act 3019 or the Anti-Graft and Corrupt Practices Act at the Office of the Ombudsman in connection with the alleged garlic cartel last year.
- January 9 – The Supreme Court declares its decision on the unconstitutionality of the Priority Development Assistance Fund (PDAF), popularly termed as the pork barrel funds, final and executory.
- January 12 – Sandiganbayan finds former Board of Nursing member Virginia Diodola-Madeja guilty of violating the Anti-Corrupt Practices Act and the PRC Modernization Act of 2000 and sentences her to 7 years imprisonment for leaking questions in the June 2006 Nursing Licensure Examinations. She is also ordered to pay a fine of 100,000 pesos and is barred from holding public office.
- January 14 – A bomb destroys a transmission tower in Pagalungan leaving much of the provinces of Maguindanao and Cotabato without power.

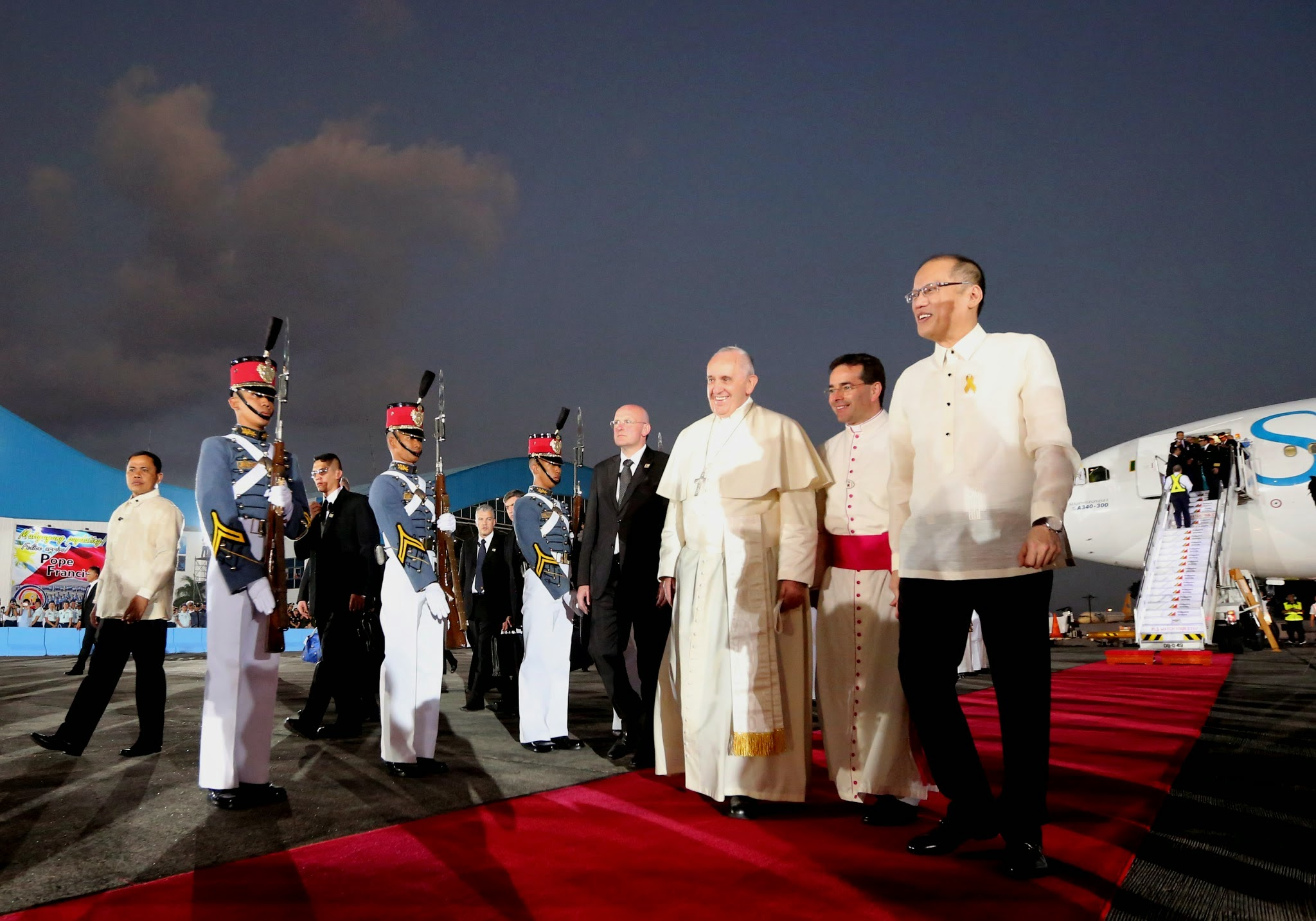
Pope Francis' arrival ceremony at Villamor Airbase.

- January 15–19 – Pope Francis visits the country for a five-day state and pastoral visit. The pope also visits the victims of Typhoon Haiyan in Leyte. This is the first papal visit to the Philippines in the 21st century.
- January 19 – Eleven people are killed while four others are injured after a wall collapses at a construction site in Guiguinto, Bulacan.
- January 21 – The Supreme Court rules in an 11–3 vote to dismiss several petitions calling for the disqualification of Manila Mayor Joseph Estrada.
- January 23 – An explosion occurs near a bus terminal in Barangay Guiwan, Zamboanga City, killing two people and injuring 53. The Abu Sayyaf Group (ASG) are blamed for the attack.

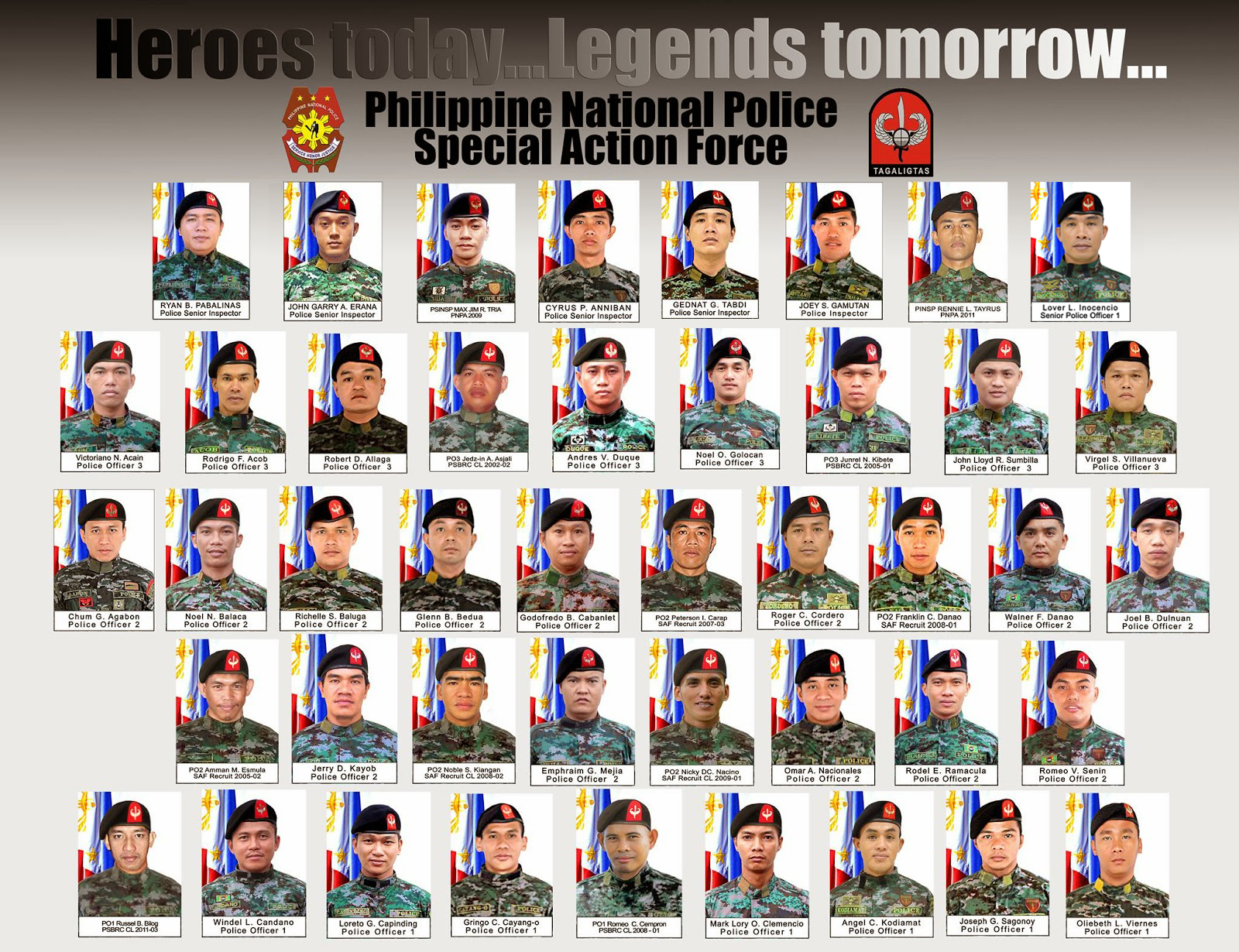
The 44 police officers who perished during the clash.

- January 25 – 44 members of the Philippine National Police-Special Action Force (PNP-SAF) are killed after a clash in Tukalinapao, Mamasapano, Maguindanao against armed fighters including those from the Moro Islamic Liberation Front (MILF) and the Bangsamoro Islamic Freedom Fighters. PNP-SAF's objective is to pursue Zulkifli Abdhir also known as Marwan and Abdul Basit Usman as part of Oplan Exodus and killed the former. The deaths of the PNP-SAF officers ignite debate on the proposed Bangsamoro Basic Law which will be the foundation of the new Bangsamoro autonomous region.
- January 26 – The Senate Blue Ribbon Committee holds Makati Mayor Jejomar Erwin "Junjun" Binay and five other officials of the Makati city government in contempt due to their alleged continued snub of an ongoing Senate probe. Three days later, Binay is arrested and forced to appear in the Senate hearing but the detention is deferred leading to his release.
- January 27 – The Department of Justice rejects the appeal by United States Marine Lance Corporal Joseph Scott Pemberton to drop the murder charges against him over the Death of Jennifer Laude, a Filipina trans woman. The trial begins on March 23.
- January 29 – The Government of the Philippines and the MILF sign a protocol for the decommissioning of rebel firearms in Kuala Lumpur, Malaysia.
- January 31 – Two Philippine Air Force (PAF) pilots are killed after their SF-260FH Number 1034 trainer aircraft crashes around 300 meters off the coast of Nasugbu, Batangas, while attending their performance for the upcoming 70th anniversary of the liberation of the town from Japanese occupation during World War II.

=== February ===
- February 2 – Former Commission on Elections Chairman Benjamin Abalos is acquitted on the 2007 electoral sabotage case by the Pasay Regional Trial Court.
- February 3 – The Supreme Court affirms the unconstitutionality of the Disbursement Acceleration Program on its new ruling. Voting 13–0, the court partially grants the government's Motion for Reconsideration on the DAP. Projects and programs that not covered by the General Approriations Act is ruled valid and the authors may be liable.
- February 5 – The Department of Foreign Affairs files two protest notes questioning China for ramming Filipino fishing boats and collecting giant clams over Scarborough Shoal (Bajo de Masinloc).
- February 14 – 50 rebel members of the New People's Army figure in a failed attack and shootout inside a police station in Mati, Davao Oriental. Four soldiers and a NPA member are killed.
- February 18 – Masbate Governor Rizalina Lanete surrenders to the Philippine National Police Criminal Investigation and Detention Group after the Sandiganbayan issues a warrant of arrest against her in connection with her participation in the PDAF scam.
- February 24 – The Supreme Court decides affirmatively about the dismissal of PMA Cadet Aldrin Jeff Cudia in 2014 due to honor code violations.
- February 25:
  - Former Association of Philippine Electric Cooperatives party-list Representative Edgar Valdez surrenders to a sheriff of the Sandiganbayan. Valdez is facing one count of plunder and seven counts of graft for allegedly receiving P57.78 million worth of kickbacks from the PDAF scam.
  - The AFP declares its all-out offensive campaign against the MILF break away group, the Bangsamoro Islamic Freedom Fighters. On March 3, Maguindanao is placed under the state of calamity due to the continuing fighting between the military and the BIFF. In an encounter on March 7, the AFP confirms that 139 members including commanders of the BIFF were killed, including a relative of BIFF founder Ameril Umbra Kato. On March 30, the AFP announces the termination of the all-out offensive against the group.
- February 28 – Twenty-six people are killed, including two soldiers and 24 members of the Abu Sayyaf Group during clashes in Patikul, Sulu.

=== March ===
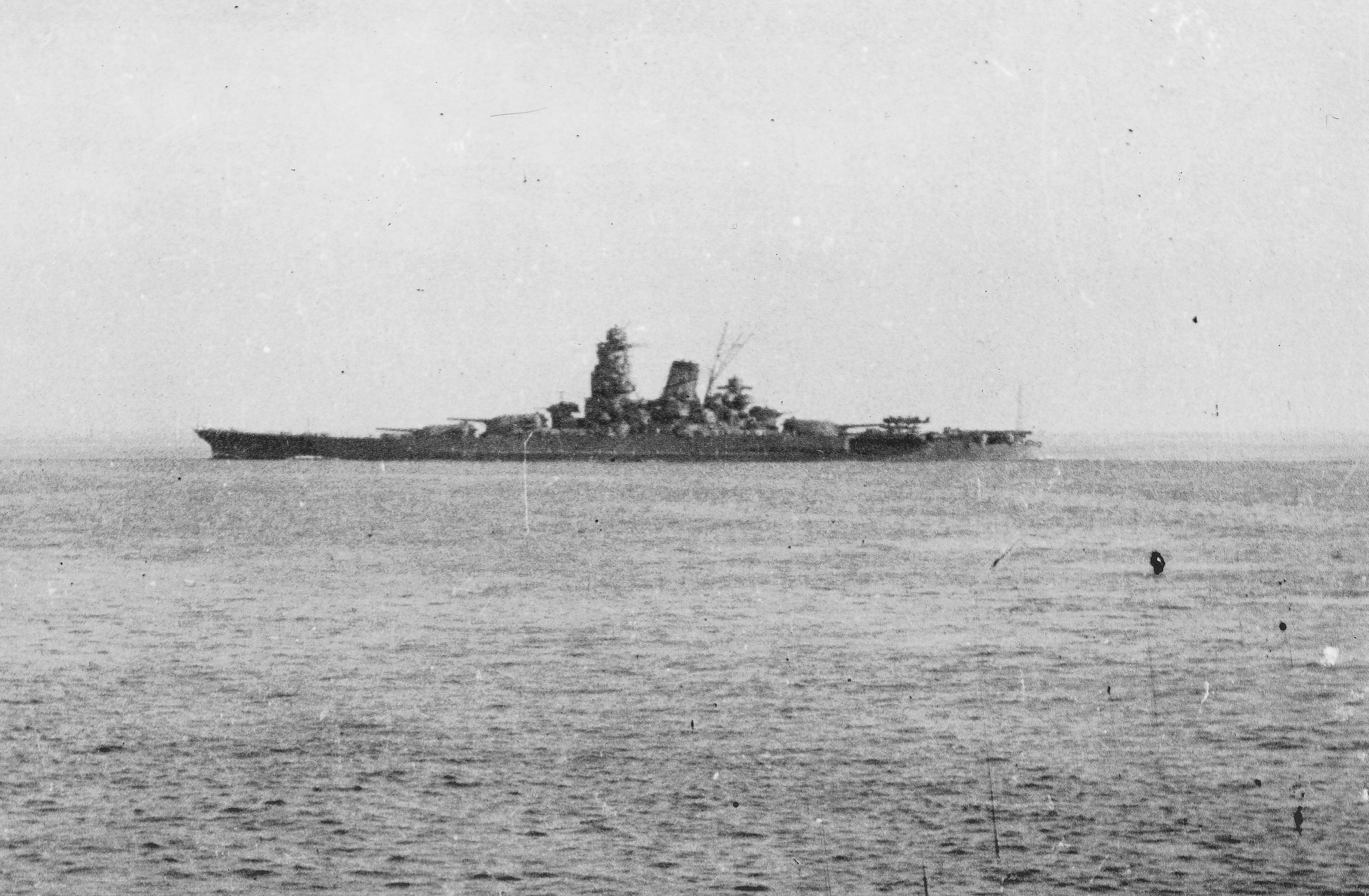
Japanese battleship Musashi (1944). The wreck of the ship was found on March 4 in the Sibuyan Sea.

- March 4 – The wreck of the World War II Japanese battleship Musashi is found by Paul Allen and his team in the Sibuyan Sea. Musashi was one of the two biggest Japanese battleships ever built; it was attacked and sunk by American aircraft on October 24, 1944, in the Battle of Leyte Gulf.
- March 6 – The Office of the Ombudsman's special panel of investigators files complaints against Vice President Jejomar Binay, Makati Mayor Junjun Binay, and 22 individuals, in connection with the overpriced Makati City Hall II Parking Building. Ombudsman will start the preliminary probe after the filing of the cases. On March 11, the Ombudsman suspends Junjun Binay and other city officials for 6 months in connection with the case. Binay defies the decision. On March 16, plunder and graft charges are filed against the two Binays for the alleged overpricing of the building. The elder Binay was city mayor and the younger Binay a city councilor at the time of the construction. On the same date, the Court of Appeals releases a temporary restraining order for the preventive suspension of Mayor Binay. On April 6, the Court of Appeals indefinitely extends its halt order on the preventive suspension of Junjun Binay, as the appellate court issues a writ of preliminary injunction in his favor. On the other hand, Acting Mayor Romulo Peña is ordered by the Department of the Interior and Local Government to step down and return to his previous post as vice mayor. On November 11, the Supreme Court reverses the Ombudsman's decision to suspend Junjun Binay.
- March 8 – British human rights lawyer Amal Clooney files a case for the continued detention of former president and Pampanga congresswoman Gloria Macapagal Arroyo against the government before the UN's Working Group on Arbitrary Detention, a body under the United Nations Commission on Human Rights. On October 2, the United Nations Working Group on Arbitrary Detention has releases its opinion that the detention of former President Arroyo "violates international law" and is "arbitrary on a number of grounds."
- March 9:
  - DFA confirms the execution of Joven Esteva, an Overseas Filipino Worker who was charged of murder on the killing of his employer in Riyadh, Saudi Arabia in 2007.
  - A Quezon City court orders the temporary release of Sajid Ampatuan, the son of Andal Ampatuan Sr., after Sajid posts bail of P11.6 million; Sajid was charged with murder in connection with the Maguindanao massacre on November 23, 2009, that killed 57 people including 31 journalists.
- March 15 – Justice for Islamic Movement founding chairman and former vice chairman of the BIFF, Mohamad Ali Tambako and five others are arrested in General Santos.
- March 17 – The Philippines submits its 3,000-page document containing additional volumes of arguments, evidence and maps seeking to nullify China's sweeping claim over the resource-rich South China Sea to the Hague-based Permanent Court of Arbitration.
- March 20 – The AFP transports 17 suspected members of the Abu Sayyaf Group from the Zamboanga City jail to Camp Bagong Diwa in Bicutan, Taguig, over security concerns raised by the Bureau of Jail Management and Penology.
- March 22 – The first of three new C-295 medium lift aircraft under the Philippine Air Force Modernization Program arrives at Clark Air Base in Pampanga.
- March 26 – President Aquino signs Republic Act No. 10656 into law that postpones the Sangguniang Kabataan (SK) elections to October 2016. This postponement was the fourth time. On March 25, the Commission on Elections had deferred the SK elections to April 25. Previously, the election was supposedly to be held on October 28, 2013; it was again postponed to February 21, 2015.

=== April ===
- April 6 – Gemma Adana, the mayor of Naga, Zamboanga Sibugay is abducted by a heavily armed group in her house. She is released after over six months in captivity on October 12.

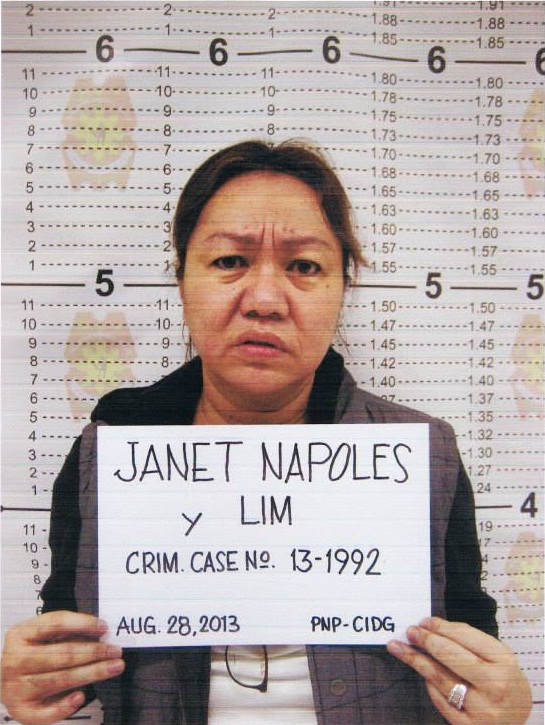
On April 14, Janet Lim Napoles was found guilty for the serious illegal detention case.

- April 14 – In connection with the serious illegal detention case, Janet Lim Napoles, the mastermind of the PDAF Scam, is found guilty beyond reasonable doubt and is sentenced to reclusion perpetua.
- April 20 – The AFP releases the pictures of the continued reclamation of China in the South China Sea.
- April 21 – The Supreme Court voids an agreement between the Commission on Elections and Smartmatic-TIM for the P300-million diagnostics and repair of the 80,000 Precinct Count Optical Scan machines for the 2016 polls.
- April 22 – The Supreme Court releases a Temporary Restraining Order for the memorandum issued by the Commission on Higher Education on the removal of Filipino and Literature college subjects as part of the K to 12 education program.
- April 29 – The execution of convicted Filipina drug mule Mary Jane Veloso in Indonesia is postponed.

=== May ===
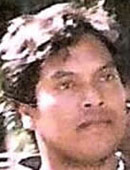
Abdul Basit Usman

- May 3 – Abdul Basit Usman, the most wanted bomb expert in the country, is killed by an MILF group unit in Guindulungan, Maguindanao.
- May 6 – The Court of Tax Appeals lifts the arrest warrant it issued against Jeane Catherine Napoles, the daughter of Janet Lim Napoles, after she failed to show up for her arraignment on a P17.46-million tax evasion case.
- May 8:
  - The Commission on Elections conducts recall election in Puerto Princesa, Palawan. Incumbent mayor Lucilo Bayron successfully defends his seat.
  - Philippine Ambassador to Pakistan Domingo D. Lucenario dies in a helicopter crash in Pakistan along with several other diplomats and the two helicopter pilots.
  - The MILF registers the United Bangsamoro Justice Party as its vehicle to run in future elections.
- May 11 – The Court of Appeals has freezes 242 bank accounts and insurance policies belonging to Vice President Binay, some members of his family and close associates, who are suspected of being his dummies.
- May 13 – At least 72 are killed in a fire inside the Kentex Manufacturing slippers factory in Brgy. Ugong, Valenzuela City. The incident was the third worst fire in Philippine history.
- May 20 – The Ombudsman dismisses the complaint filed by former Iloilo Provincial Administrator Manuel Mejorada against Senator Franklin Drilon, DPWH Secretary Rogelio Singson, DOT Secretary Ramon Jimenez Jr., and other officials involved in the construction of the Iloilo Convention Center.

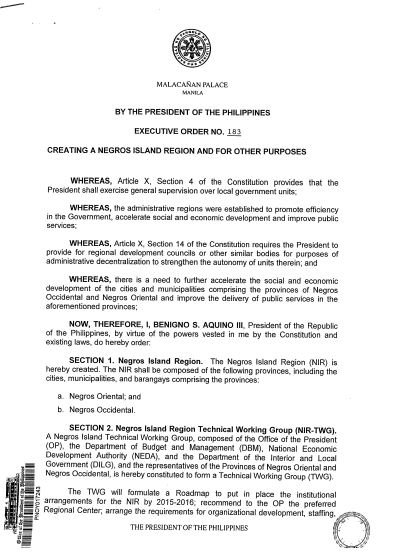
First Page of the Executive Order creating Negros Island Region (click for larger version).

- May 29 – President Aquino signs Executive Order No. 183 that created the Negros Island Region to improve the delivery of public services in Negros Occidental and Negros Oriental, which forms part of the new region.

=== June ===
- June 3 – The United States Embassy turns over to the Philippine government a check amounting to some $1.3 million as the second tranche of proceeds from the forfeited assets of former AFP comptroller Maj. Gen. Carlos Garcia.
- June 16 – The first phase of decommissioning of MILF's fighters begins.
- June 22 – Vice President Jejomar Binay resigns from his post in the Aquino Cabinet as chair of the Housing and Urban Development Coordinating Council and presidential adviser on overseas Filipino workers.
- June 25:
  - The Ombudsman files graft charges against Optical Media Board chair Ronnie Ricketts and four others for allegedly allowing the return of confiscated copyright violating DVDs and VCDs to the Sky High Marketing Corporation in 2010.
  - Raul Pangalangan, former dean of the University of the Philippines College of Law, is elected judge of the International Criminal Court.
  - All Philippine airliners can now enter European airspace after the European Commission removes the Philippines from the European Union Air Safety List.
- June 29:
  - The Philippines halts the repair of its airstrip on Pagasa Island in the disputed Spratly Islands due to its pending suit at the Permanent Court of Arbitration in The Hague challenging China's claim over the waters.
  - Ombudsman Conchita Carpio-Morales approves the preventive suspension of Makati Mayor Junjun Binay in connection with his supposed involvement in the alleged anomalous construction of a ten-storey building in Makati Science High School.
- June 30:
  - The Ombudsman dismisses former Philippine National Police chief Director General Alan Purisima and 10 other officials for entering into an anomalous contract with courier service Werfast Documentary Agency in 2011.
  - The Philippines and six other countries defer joining the newly established Asian Infrastructure Investment Bank.
  - The Supreme Court asks the government to respond to a petition seeking to repeal a law banning same-sex marriage in the country.
  - Senator Miriam Defensor Santiago files a lawsuit against the Enhanced Defense Cooperation Agreement in the Supreme Court.

=== July ===
- July 1 – The Philippine National Oil Company–Exploration Corporation announces the discovery of a major natural gas reserves of 71-billion cubic feet in Isabela.
- July 2 – MB Kim Nirvana, a motorized banca bound for Camotes Islands from Ormoc, Leyte, capsizes off the coast of Ormoc killing 62 of its 173 passengers.
- July 3 – Ombudsman Conchita Carpio-Morales orders the filing of graft charges against former Metro Rail Transit 3 general manager Al Vitangcol III and five incorporators of Philippine Trans Rail Management and Services Corporation in connection with alleged irregularities in the MRT-3's interim maintenance contract.
- July 7 – Oral arguments on the Philippines' claim over the West Philippine Sea begins in The Hague.
- July 10 – Lt. Gen. Hernando Iriberri, former 56th Commanding General of the Philippine Army is designated as AFP Chief of Staff.
- July 14 – Dir. Ricardo Marquez, director for operations since December 2013 is named the new chief of the Philippine National Police.
- July 15 – Major General Eduardo Año, who is linked to the disappearance of activist Jonas Burgos in 2007, is names the new chief of the Philippine Army.
- July 17 – Nine miners are killed when a mining site collapsed following a rain-induced landslide in Caluya, Antique.
- July 20 – Vice President Binay files a P200-million damage suit arising from alleged libelous statements against Senators Antonio Trillanes IV and Alan Peter Cayetano; Ombudsman Conchita Carpio-Morales; former Makati Vice Mayor Ernesto Mercado; and eight others.
- July 21 – President Aquino signs into law two of his priority economic bills: the Philippine Competition Act (Republic Act No. 10667), as well as amendments to the 50-year-old Cabotage Law (Republic Act No. 10668), during a ceremony in Malacañang attended by members of Congress.
- July 23 – The Iglesia ni Cristo expels Tenny Manalo, the widow of INC's former executive minister Eraño Manalo, and their son, Angel Manalo after they appear in a YouTube video claiming their lives are in danger and that some ministers have allegedly been abducted.
- July 24 – The Department of Science and Technology's free Wi-Fi project is launched.
- July 27 – President Aquino delivers his 6th and final State of the Nation Address at the Batasang Pambansa.
- July 28 – The environmental groups Basel Action Network and BAN Toxics submit a case questioning the Canada's imported trash in the Philippines to the Basel Convention.

=== August ===
- August 7 – Senator Gringo Honasan, former CIBAC congressman and now TESDA chair Joel Villanueva, and seven other former and incumbent lawmakers are charged before the Ombudsman in connection with the pork barrel scam.
- August 16 – Pamana, a 3-year-old Philippine Eagle, is shot dead inside her forest sanctuary in Mount Hamiguitan, Davao Oriental, 2 months after she freed in time for Independence Day.
- August 17 – The Philippine Air Force receives 10 brand-new helicopters for combat utility and attack to be used for internal security operations.
- August 18 – The Supreme Court grants the bail petition of Sen. Juan Ponce Enrile, one of the three senators facing graft and plunder charges in connection with the alleged pork barrel scam.
- August 20:
  - Two Coast Guard officers who were kidnapped by the Abu Sayyaf Group escape after a massive operation by the AFP against the group in Sulu.
  - President Aquino signs Republic Act 10669 into law, declaring August 18 of every year as Jesse Robredo Day in honor of interior and local government secretary Jesse Robredo who died in a plane crash in the waters off Masbate City on August 18, 2012.
- August 21 – The Supreme Court]affirms the conviction of two Alpha Phi Omega (APO) members for the hazing of University of the Philippines Los Baños student Marlon Vilanueva in 2006, the first conviction under Republic Act 8049 or the Anti-Hazing Law.
- August 24 – President Aquino orders the Bureau of Customs to stop the physical inspections of balikbayan boxes unless X-ray and K-9 examinations give rise to suspicions that they contain prohibited items. On the Senate hearing last September 3, Bureau of Customs chief Alberto Lina went apologized to the inconvenience brought about the alleged opening of balikbayan boxes by Customs personnel.
- August 27–31 – Iglesia ni Cristo members stage demonstrations near the Department of Justice and later in EDSA against Justice Secretary Leila de Lima's investigation on its leadership controversy, alleging violations of the separation of church and state.

=== September ===
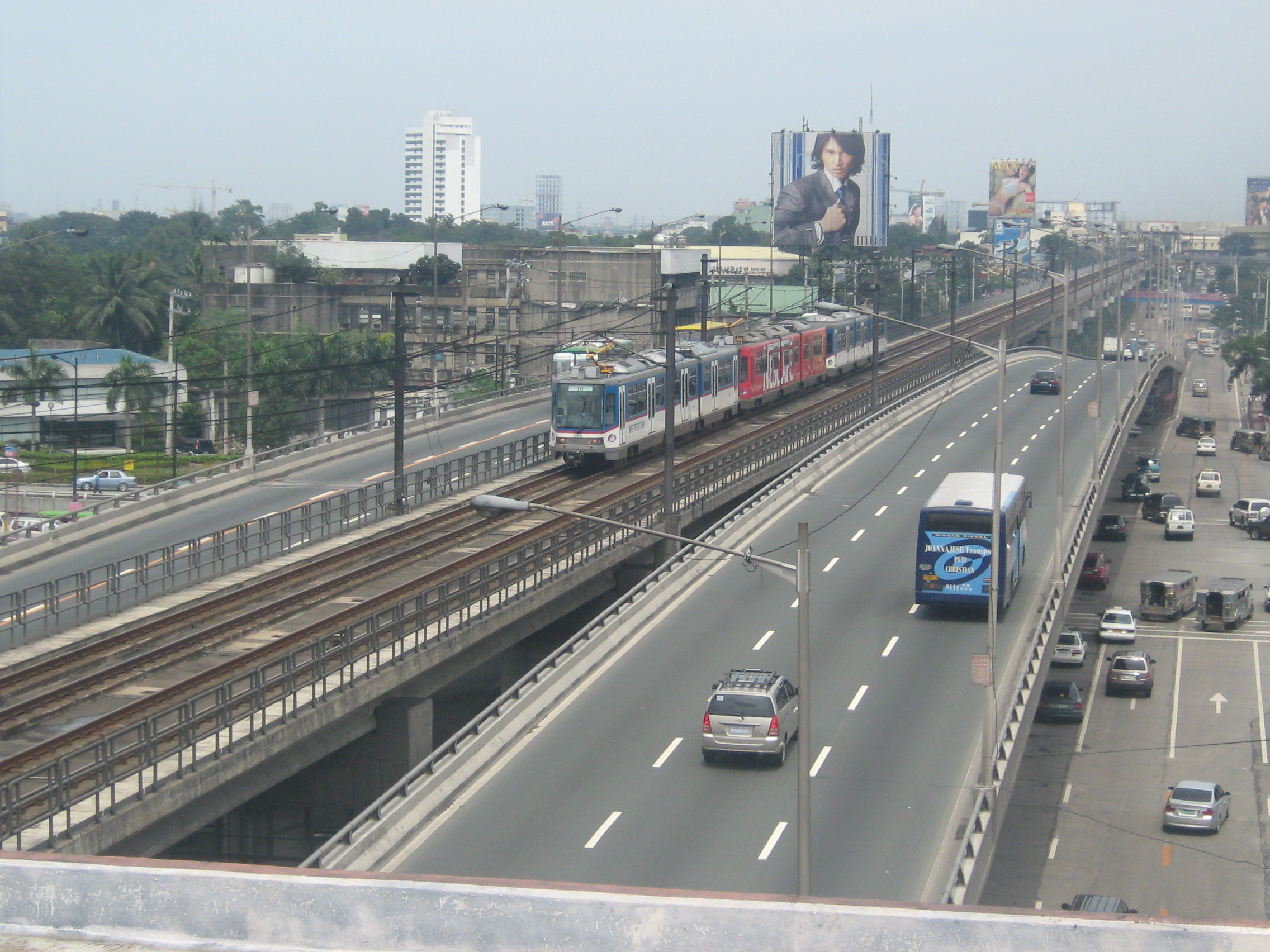
Epifanio de los Santos Avenue

- September 8 – President Aquino announces the appointment of former Liberal Party (LP) Secretary General Mel Senen Sarmiento as Secretary of the Interior and Local Government, replacing Mar Roxas.
- September 10 – Human Rights Watch criticizes President Aquino reaction to the reported murders of an indigenous Lumad family and the alleged rape of an indigenous Manobo girl by soldiers and militiamen of the Philippine Army. The Philippine Commission on Human Rights condemns the killings and links the Bagani paramilitary group and the Army's 36th Infantry Battalion who it believes were of the opinion that a Manobo school was an "NPA School".
- September 11 – The Basilan Regional Trial Court officially declares Abu Sayyaf a terrorist group.
- September 18 – One person is killed in a bomb explosion on a bus in Zamboanga City; 28 were injured.
- September 20 – Former Palawan governor Joel Reyes and his brother, Mario, former Coron, Palawan, mayor are arrested by Thai police due to overstaying in Phuket. The Reyes brothers are primary suspects in the killing of environmental journalist Gerry Ortega in January 2011, the two deported back to Manila four days later.
- September 21 – Three foreigners and a Filipina are kidnapped by a dozen armed men at a resort in the Island Garden City of Samal, Davao del Norte.
- September 30 – Former Abra governor Vicente Valera is found guilty with 2 counts of murder, sentenced to up to 40 years in prison in relation to the killing of his rival, former Abra Representative Luis Bersamin in 2006.

=== October ===
- October 9 – The Ombudsman orders the dismissal in service and the eventual perpetual disqualification to run in any political positions for former Makati Mayor Junjun Binay, in connection with the overpriced Makati City Hall Building II.
- October 13 – The MILF and the Moro National Liberation Front sign a "unified declaration" calling for the approval the draft Bangsamoro Basic Law as an embodiment of each other's separate peace pacts with Malacañang.
- October 17–28 – PAGASA confirms that the haze from Indonesia has reached Mindanao. Typhoon Lando and the northeast monsoon are also linked to the haze. The haze affects operations of airports in Mindanao and the Visayas. On October 28, PAGASA declares that the country was free from haze.

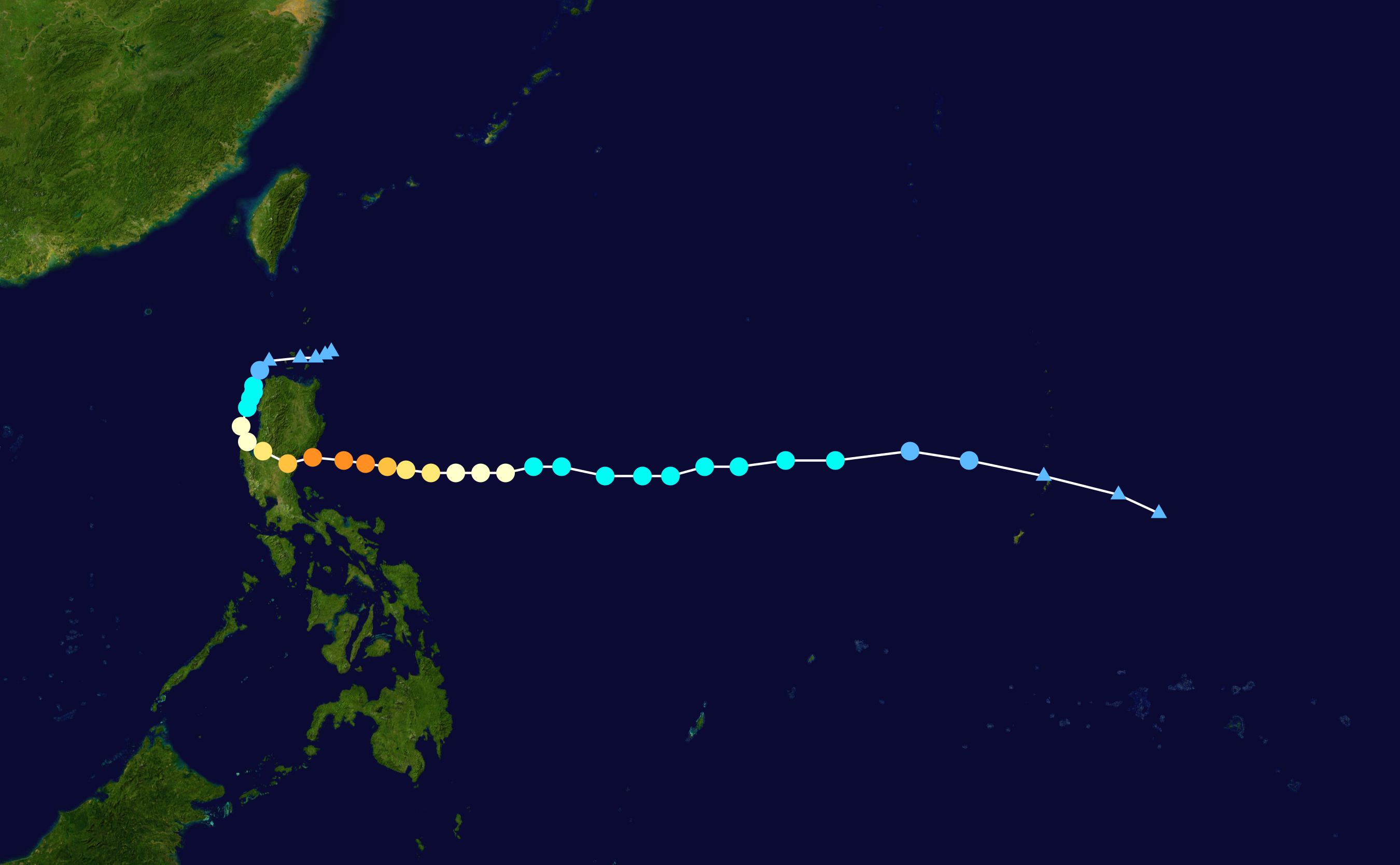
Typhoon Lando's Track

- October 18 – 46 are killed, 82 are injured and 268,877 families are affected after heavy rains and floods due to Typhoon Lando hits Luzon.
- October 21 – The Ombudsman sacks five officials of the Technology Resource Center, particularly Deputy Director General Dennis Cunanan for their alleged participation in the PDAF scam.
- October 26 – President Aquino signs the amended Public Employment Service Office bill into law during the 15th National PESO Congress at the Philippine International Convention Center in Pasay.
- October 30 – The United Nations backs the Permanent Court of Arbitration on its ruling that it has the jurisdiction to hear the maritime claim of the Philippines against China.

=== November ===
- November 3 – The Court of Appeals begins hearings on the writ of amparo and habeas corpus petitions of expelled Iglesia ni Cristo minister Lowell Menorca II against the leaders of the church, including executive minister Eduardo Manalo and three members of the Sanggunian, in connection with Menorca's illegal detention and abduction by church officials.
- November 4 – The UN Department of Safety and Security warns their staff assigned in the country against the tanim-bala modus at Ninoy Aquino International Airport.
- November 5 – The ASEAN Centre for Biodiversity officially declares Tubbataha Reef in Sulu Sea as the 35th heritage park.
- November 17 – Voted 5–4, the Senate Electoral Tribunal denies a petition filed by aspiring 2016 presidential candidate Rizalito David for the disqualification of Grace Poe as Senator.
- November 18–19 – The Philippines hosts the 2015 Asia-Pacific Economic Cooperation, organizing a series of economic meetings in the country until November, which was highlighted by the APEC Economic Leaders Meeting near the end of the summit.
- November 20 – Princess Jacel Kiram and Malaysian politician Nurul Izzah Anwar post a photo demanding Malaysian Prime Minister Najib Razak to free opposition leader Anwar Ibrahim which is received negatively in that country, prompting Nurul Izzah to apologize.
- November 25 – Eight armed men who are identified as supporters of ISIS, together with an Indonesian bomb trainer, are killed in an encounter with the AFP in Palimbang, Sultan Kudarat.
- November 28 – The first two of 12 KAI T-50 Golden Eagle fighter jets, made by the Korea Aerospace Industries, that the government purchased from South Korea arrive at Clark Air Base in Angeles City.

=== December ===
- December 1:
  - U.S. Marine L. Cpl. Joseph Scott Pemberton, suspect in the death of Jennifer Laude one year ago, is found guilty of homicide by the Olongapo Regional Trial Court and is sentenced to 6–12 years in prison. The court also ordered for Pemberton to pay ₱4.5 million (US$130,000) to the Laude family.
  - Senator Grace Poe is disqualified by the Commission of Elections 2nd Division from being president after failing to reach the 10-year residency requirement for a presidential candidate.

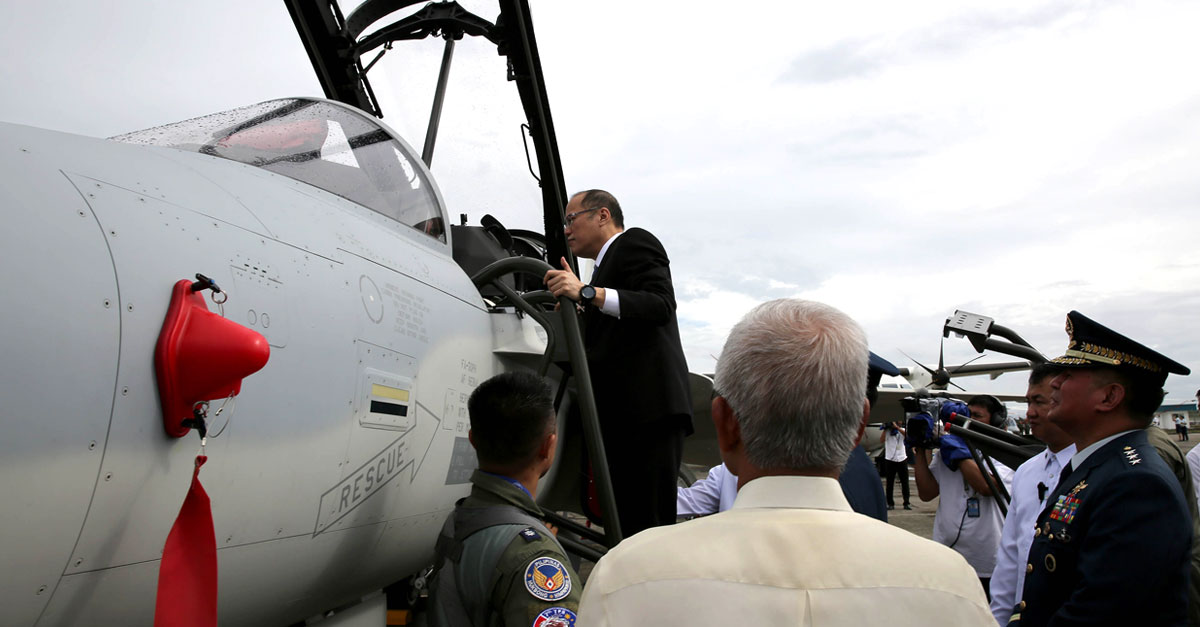
President Benigno Aquino III inspecting a FA-50PH Golden Eagle

- December 5 – The Philippine Air Force receives two FA-50 lead-in fighter jets, two C-295 medium-lift fixed-wing aircraft and six Augusta 109 attack helicopters for territorial defense, search and rescue, disaster response and combat operations.
- December 9 – The Office of the President orders a 60-day preventive suspension order against Cebu City Mayor Mike Rama for alleged culpable violation of the constitution, grave abuse of authority, grave misconduct and oppression over the destruction of local government projects in his city.
- December 11 – Grace Poe's certificate of candidacy is cancelled by the Commission of Elections 1st Division after a 2–1 vote, barring her from running as president after failing to comply with the ten-year residency requirement by the Philippine Constitution.

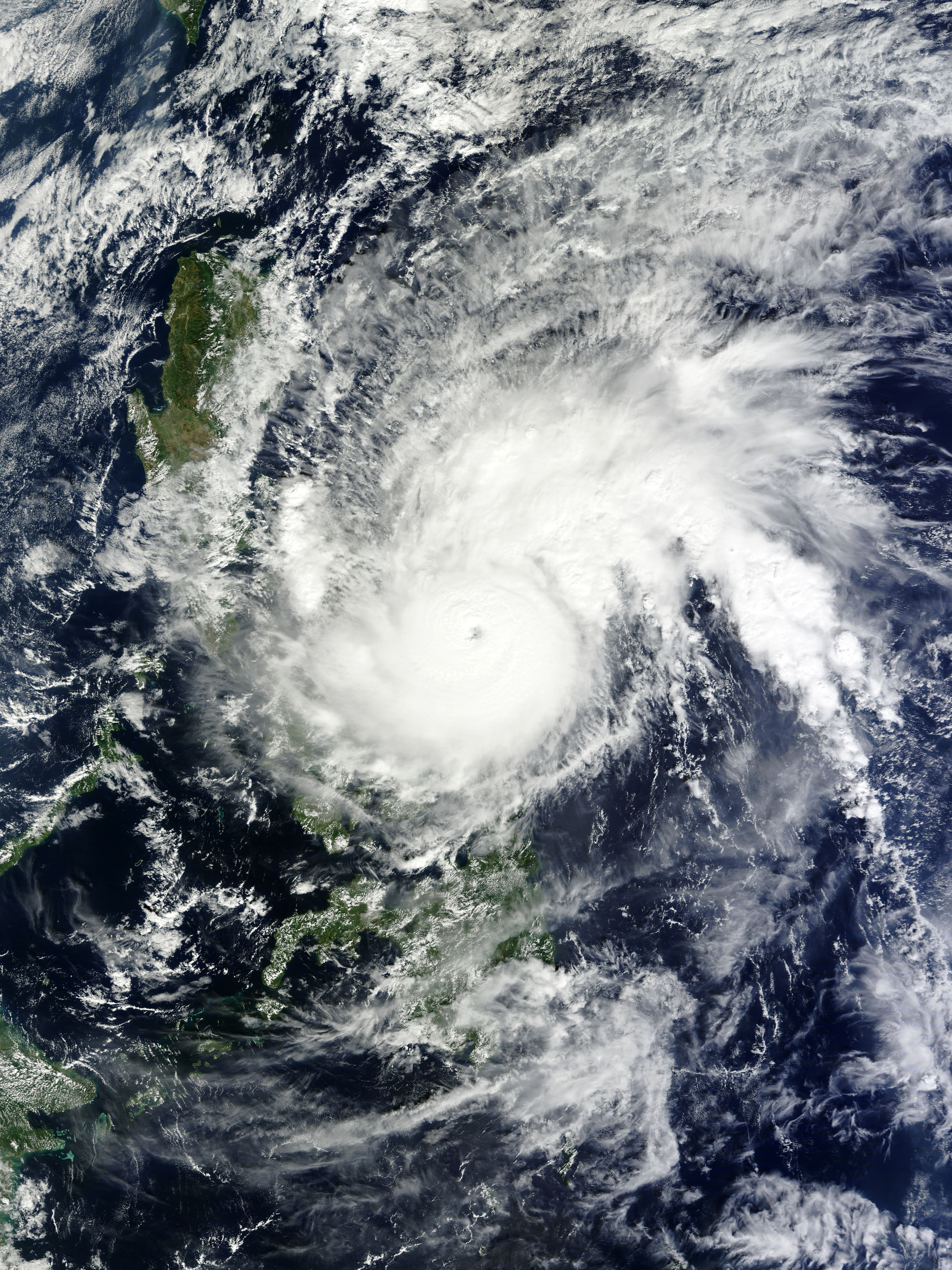
Typhoon Melor (Nona) approaching Samar

- December 12 – General Trias becomes a component city in the province of Cavite through ratification of Republic Act 10675.
- December 13–17 – Typhoon Melor (locally called Nona) makes landfall in Northern Samar and made more landfalls before dissipating. Forty-two are killed during the typhoon and damages cost over ₱6 billion ($136 million).
- December 18 – President Aquino declares a state of national calamity due to the onslaught of Typhoon Melor (locally named as: Nona) that hit different provinces in Luzon and Visayas.

== Holidays ==
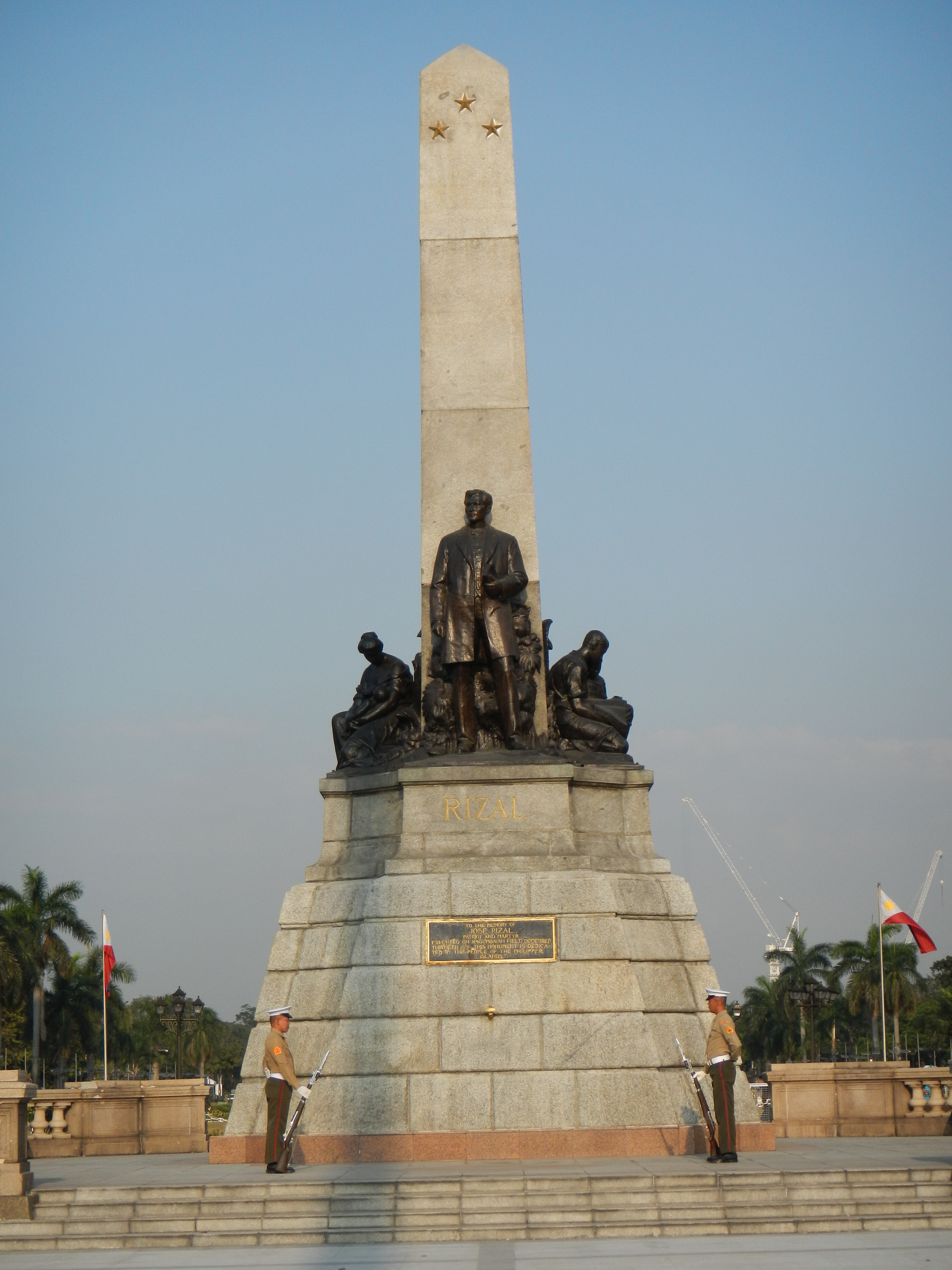
2015 will be the 119th year of the commemoration of Dr. Jose P. Rizal's death.

On July 17, 2014, the government had already announced at least 18 Philippine holidays for 2015 as declared by virtue of Proclamation No. 831, series of 2014. Note that in the list, holidays in italics are "special non-working holidays," those in bold are "regular holidays," and those in non-italics and non-bold are "special holidays for schools."

In addition, several other places observe local holidays, such as the foundation of their town. These are also "special days."

- January 1 – **New Year's Day**
- January 2 – Special non-working holiday
- February 19 – Chinese New Year
- February 25 – 1986 EDSA Revolution
- April 2 – **Maundy Thursday**
- April 3 – **Good Friday**
- April 4 – Black Saturday
- April 9 – **Araw ng Kagitingan** (Day of Valor)
- May 1 – **Labor Day**
- June 12 – **Independence Day**
- July 17 – **Eid'l Fitr** (Feast of Ramadan)
- August 21 – Ninoy Aquino Day
- August 31 – **National Heroes Day**
- September 25 – **Eid al-Adha** (Feast of Sacrifices)
- November 1 – All Saints Day
- November 30 – **Bonifacio Day**
- December 24 – Special non-working holiday (in observation of the Christmas season)
- December 25 – **Christmas Day**
- December 30 – **Rizal Day**
- December 31 – Last day of the year (in observation of the coming New Year's celebration)

== Business and economy ==
- January 1 – The ASEAN Economic Integration comes into force. The integration aims to create a single economic market within the region.
- January 9 – In a report released by the National Economic and Development Authority, the Philippines outperforms other economies in the Asia-Pacific region in terms of export trade in 2014.
- January 12 – Low-cost carrier Cebu Pacific is fined an amount of 50 million pesos by the Civil Aeronautics Board after more than ten thousand passengers were affected by 288 flight delays and 20 flight cancellations caused by the airline from December 24 to 26 of last year.
- January 20 – The International Monetary Fund upgrades its economic growth forecasts for the Philippines. In the said forecast, the country's economic growth in 2015 is expected to be at 6.3%, and 6.2% in 2016. In the 2nd quarter report, the forecast slightly raises to 6.7% percent compared to 6.6% due to higher government spending.
- January 28 – In the 2015 Index of Economic Freedom, the country ranks 76th freest economy and one of the ten most improved economies in the world. The country ranked 89th in 2014.
- May 12 – The Department of Transportation and Communications announces the development of a nationwide regulations for vehicles for hire.
- October 12–14 – The Philippines hosts the 15th Forbes Global CEO Conference held in Manila. CEOs and business leaders from different parts of the world attended the event.
- November 30 – The Philippines' largest liquor producer Emperador Inc. buys Spain's Fundador for €275 million ($291 million).
- December 31 – The Philippines joins the AIIB, signing the Articles of Agreement.

== Health ==
- February 11:
  - The Department of Health (DOH) released a report showing that the count of recorded cases of Human Immunodeficiency Virus (HIV) in the country during 2014 reached 6,011. This was high compared to the 2013 count of 4,814. In total, there were already 22,527 cases of HIV disease since 1984.
  - A 32-year-old Filipino nurse from Saudi Arabia, who was also 1 month pregnant, was the country's first Middle East respiratory syndrome-coronavirus (MERS-CoV) case, DOH confirmed after the test turned out to be positive of the said virus. The Evangelista Medical Hospital in San Pedro, Laguna, the facility where the patient was first admitted, was temporarily closed by DOH for fourteen days. On February 17, all those who had exposure or had contact with the said nurse were tested negative of the said virus. On March 6, The Department of Foreign Affairs confirmed three Filipino female healthcare workers in Saudi Arabia who were infected with MERS-CoV.
- February 19 – In a report published by the World Health Organization, the Philippines was one of the countries in the Western Pacific that were reported to have the highest dengue cases.
- February 23 – DOH confirmed the death of a returning female OFW musician from China, few days after she arrived last February 14. The death might be a possible case of the Bird Flu virus.
- July 6 – DOH confirmed the second detected case of MERS-CoV in the country. The patient who had contracted the virus was from the Middle East and was referred to the Research Institute for Tropical Medicine last July 4. Another person, who was also showing symptoms, was placed in isolation after he had close contact with the said patient; eight others, who also had contacted with the patient, were identified. DOH is in the process of tracking all the people whom the patient had contacted with.
- July 10 – About 2,000 people in the Caraga region, mostly school children, experienced food poisoning after reportedly eating durian and mangosteen candies. The next day, the Department of Health in Caraga region has declared a food poisoning outbreak due to the incident.
- July 29 – Around 300 school children from various public schools in Zamboanga del Sur, Zamboanga del Norte and Misamis Occidental were rushed to hospitals after they complained of stomach pain and vomiting after taking deworming medicines during the nationwide deworming activity of the Department of Health.
- October 1 – Bulacan is placed under a state of calamity due to increased cases of dengue. Since January, more than 11 were recorded deaths due to the virus.
- December 23 – The Philippines became the first Asian country to approve the sale of the world's first dengue vaccine, the Dengvaxia.

== Sports ==
- February 11–27, Cycling – The fifth year of the Ronda Pilipinas has commenced. Two qualifying rounds were held in Visayas and Luzon within February 11 to 17. Mindanao qualifiers was cancelled due to the clash in Mamasapano, Maguindanao.
- February 16 – Athlete of the Year and 2014 Asian Games gold medalist for BMX cycling, Daniel Caluag led the 73 awardees in the 2014 PSA Annual Awards held at the One Espanade in Pasay.
- February 26–March 1, Racing – The Shell Eco-marathon Asia, a racing competition of enviro-friendly proto-type cars invented and designed by engineering students in the Asia-Pacific region, was held at Quirino Grandstand, Manila.
- March 8, Triathlon – Australian Tim Reed and Great Britain national Parys Edwards claimed the championship title in the inaugural edition of Century Tuna Ironman 70.3 held in Subic Bay, Zambales.
- March 14, Volleyball – The Ateneo Lady Eagles has won their second straight championship in the UAAP Season 77 women's tournament finals. Alyssa Valdez was named as the Most Valuable Player of the season, while Amy Ahomiro claimed her Finals MVP award.
- April 8, Basketball – The Philippine Basketball Association (PBA) recognized 40 greatest players played for the league in 4 decades as part of their 40th anniversary celebratory rites held at the Resorts World Manila.
- April 14–19, Basketball – Cagayan de Oro hosted the 2015 SEABA Under-16 Championship.
- April 25–26, Triathlon – Subic Bay hosted the 2015 ASTC Triathlon Asian Cup.
- April 28–May 3, Touch Football – The Philippine national touch football team, composed of both men and women and collectively known as Philippine Pythons, competed in the Touch Football World Cup held in New South Wales, Australia.
- May 1–9, Volleyball – The Philippines hosted the first 2015 Asian U23 Women's Volleyball Championship. The Philippines placed seventh.

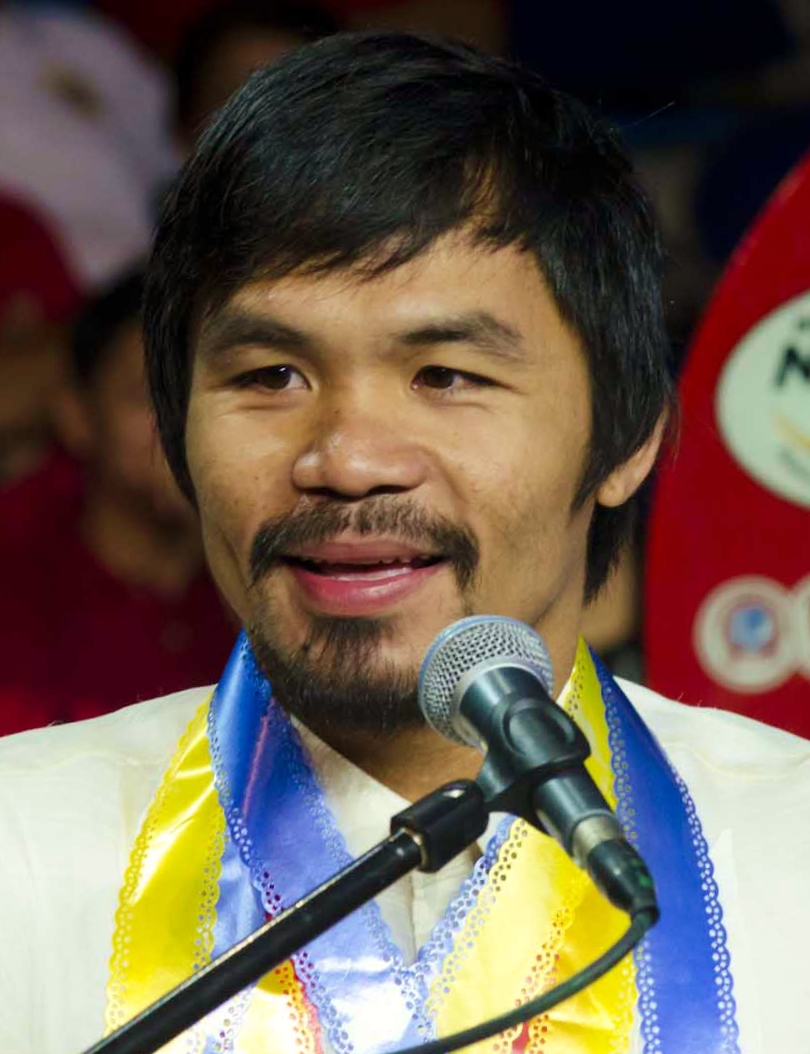
Manny Pacquiao lost the boxing match against Floyd Mayweather Jr.

- May 3, Boxing – Dubbed as the "Battle for Greatness" or the "Fight of the Century," Floyd Mayweather Jr. kept his undefeated fight record after he had defeated Manny Pacquiao via a unanimous decision in a match held at the MGM Grand Garden Arena in Las Vegas, Nevada.
- May 3–9, Multi-sport – Tagum, Davao del Norte hosted the 2015 Palarong Pambansa. More than 12,000 student-athletes, coaches, and officials from 17 regions participated in the multi-sports event.
- May 14:
  - Basketball – Chito Narvasa was named as the newest PBA commissioner, replacing Chito Salud. Narvasa will start his work on the start of Season 71 of the said league.
  - Volleyball – The Petron Blaze Spikers earned their consecutive victory after the team won the Finals title of the 2015 PSL All-Filipino Conference upon defeating Shopinas.com Lady Clickers during set 4. Former FEU star Rachel Daquis was proclaimed as the MVP.
- May 16, Mixed Martial Arts – Frankie Edgar defeated Urijah Faber via unanimous decision on the main fight of the first UFC event in the country, UFC Fight Night: Manila held at the MOA Arena. Mark Muñoz also gave his final farewell fight on the event.
- June 8, Basketball – UCLA-commit Kobe Paras successfully defended his title in the FIBA 3x3 Slam Dunk Contest in Hungary, fending off challengers from the United States, Uruguay, and the host nation.
- June 5–16, Multi-sport – The country's athletes competed in the 2015 Southeast Asian Games in Singapore. The Philippines placed sixth overall, earning 29 gold, 36 silver and 66 bronze medals.
- July 12, Boxing – Donnie Nietes, known as the longest-reigning Filipino boxing champion, won the title defense against Mexico's Francisco Rodriguez via majority decision in Cebu.
- July 19, Boxing – Nonito Donaire made short work of his French opponent, stopping Anthony Settoul in just two rounds of their 10-round bout at the Cotai Arena in Macau.
- August 7, Basketball – In a vote of 14 against 7, China won the bidding against the Philippines for the hosting rights of the 2019 FIBA World Cup held in Tokyo, Japan.
- August 26 – President Aquino signed the Republic Act 10676 or more known as the Student-Athletes Protection Act that lead to the removal of the two-year residency rules in collegiate leagues including UAAP.
- August 29 – September 6, October 3, Basketball – Philippine men's national basketball team won the silver medal of the 2015 William Jones Cup held at Taipei, Taiwan. Gilas ended with a record of 6 wins, and 2 losses. Gilas also won the silver medal in the 2015 FIBA Asia Championship. China officially got the ticket for the 2016 Summer Olympics.
- October 3 – The NU Pep Squad won their third straight title in the 2015 UAAP Cheerdance Competition held in the SM Mall of Asia Arena and well attended by more than 26,000 spectators.
- October 18, Boxing – Pinoy Pride 33: Philippines vs. The World at StubHub Center in Carson, California, Donnie Nietes, Albert and Jason Pagara and Mark Magsayo are all emerged victorious against their Latino counterparts.
- December 6–8, Tennis — The country has hosted again, the second leg of the 2015 season of International Premier Tennis League (IPTL).
- December 12, Boxing – Nonito Donaire defeated Mexican boxer Cesar Juarez to claim the vacant WBO super bantamweight title in Puerto Rico.

== Entertainment and culture ==
- January 9 – The winners for the 13th Gawad Tanglaw awards for television, radio and film are revealed.
- January 26 – Miss Philippines Mary Jean Lastimosa fails to enter the Top 5 of the Miss Universe 2014 pageant held in Miami, Florida.
- January 29 – The winners of the 1st MITV Gawad Kamalayan Awards are announced; the said awards was organized by Mapua Institute of Technology.
- February 5 – Viva Entertainment and SM Cinemas joint forces for the launching of the "SineAsia" theater featuring Asian movies dubbed in Filipino.
- February 11 – ABS-CBN TV Plus or the Mahiwagang Black Box, a digital terrestrial television box brand, is launched during the ceremonial switch-on and launching held at the ABS-CBN Compound.
- February 14 – Police Officer 1 Mariano Flormata Jr., more popularly known as Neil Perez, is crowned as the winner of the Mister International 2014 pageant held in Seoul, South Korea.
- February 26 – A Metro Manila Film Festival Cinema, a mini-theater showing the movie entries of the MMFF, in Guadalupe, Makati, is inaugurated by the MMDA.
- February 28 – Aiko Melendez, for her portrayal in the film Asintado, is awarded the Best Actress in a Foreign Language Film in the International Filmmakers Festival of World Cinema in London, England.
- March 15 – Pia Alonzo Wurtzbach, a three-timer contestant of the Binibining Pilipinas, wins the title of Miss Universe Philippines in this year's pageant.
- March 16 – CNN Philippines is launched; prior to its launching, the channel was known as 9 News. The rebranding was done after Turner Broadcasting System inked a partnership and licensing deal with Nine Media Corporation in October of last year.
- April 11 – Cherie Gil is hailed as the Best Actress in the 2015 ASEAN International Film Festival and Awards Night, on her role as opera singer in the film Sonata. Nora Aunor is honored as the Lifetime Achievement Awardee.
- May 7 – In a formal rites, Vigan City is formally introduced to the public as part of the "New 7 Wonder Cities".
- May 14 – Batangas-based shadow play dance troupe El Gamma Penumbra, who also once joined Pilipinas Got Talent, wins the inaugural season of Asia's Got Talent aired on AXN Asia. Filipino classical crossover singer Gerphil Flores also placed third in the competition.
- May 31 – Angelia Gabrena Ong of Manila is hailed as the 2015 Miss Philippines Earth, on its Grand Coronation Night held at the Mall of Asia Arena.
- June 7 – Comedian Melai Cantiveros is named the first grand winner of Your Face Sounds Familiar held at the Newport Performing Arts Theater at Resorts World Manila.

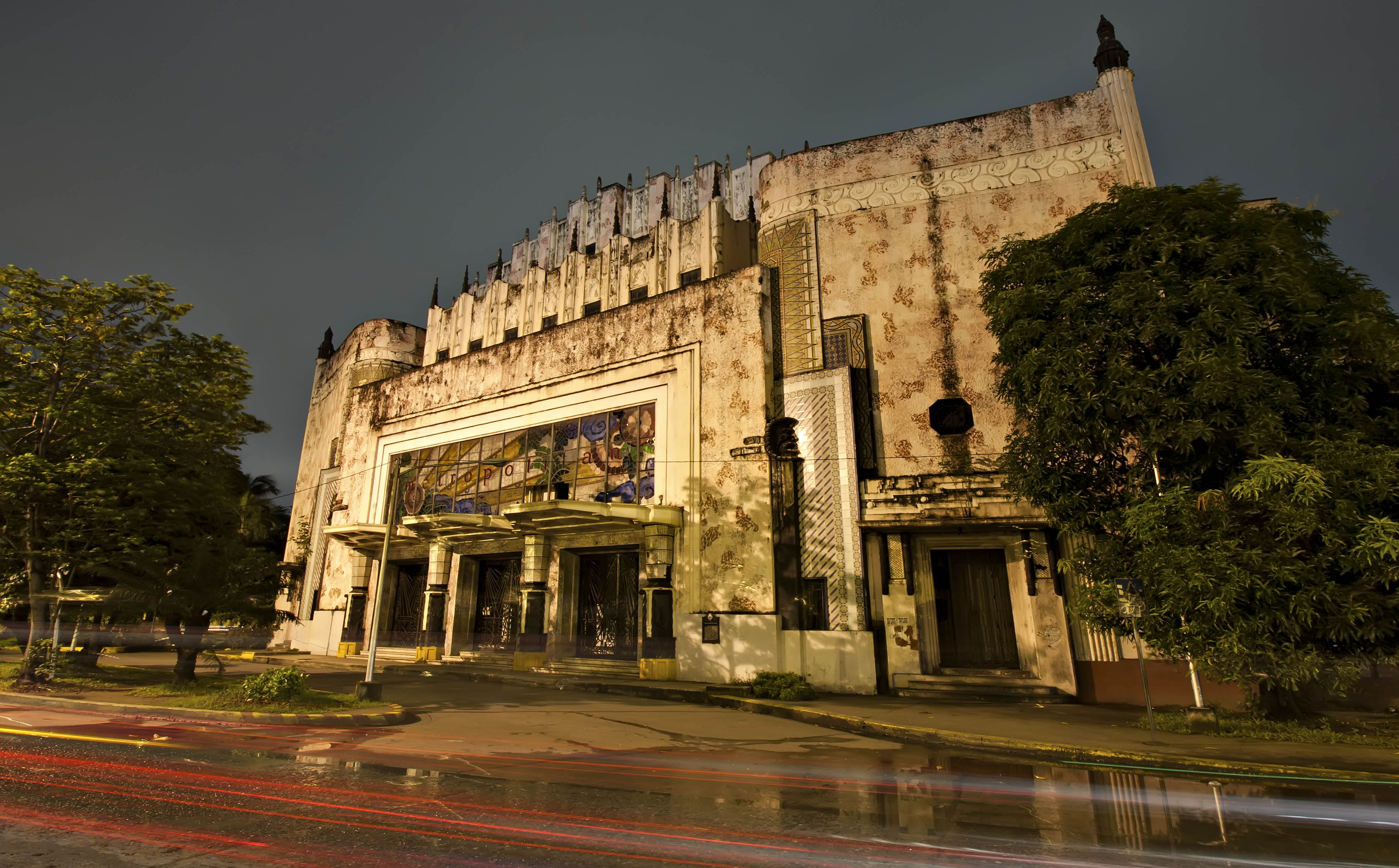
Manila Metropolitan Theater.

- June 10 – The National Commission for Culture and the Arts (NCCA) now officially owns the Manila Metropolitan Theater (MET), after the signing of the deed of absolute sale between the NCCA and its previous owner, the Government Service Insurance System (GSIS).
- June 16 – The Supreme Court releases a Temporary Restraining Order for the construction of the controversial Torre de Manila condominium also known as the National photobomber, which culture advocates have slammed for destroying the view of the historic Rizal Shrine.
- July 22 – American singer Chris Brown is placed under the Philippine government's immigration lookout bulletin, hours before his solo concert at the SM Mall of Asia Arena. Brown was able to leave Manila on July 24 after he had filed a departure clearance due to a legal issue between him and Iglesia ni Cristo that prevented him from leaving the Philippines.
- August 15 – Martika Ramirez Escobar's creation "Pusong Bato" and Angelie Mae Macalanda's Wawa are given top honors for both Best Short Film, and Special Jury Prize, respectively in the 2015 Cinemalaya Awards Night.
- August 30 – Elha Nympha, coached by Bamboo Mañalac, wins the second season of The Voice Kids held at the Newport Performing Arts Theater, Resorts World Manila.
- September 13 – Reniel Villareal, an Overseas Filipino Worker designated in the Middle East, wins the crown of Mister International Philippines 2015.
- September 17–20 – Universal Events & Entertainment, a subsidiary of the Al Ahli Holding Group launches the first Asia Pop Comic Convention in World Trade Center, Manila which would become the largest pop culture convention in the country. Hollywood stars, Paul Bettany, Nathalie Emmanuel and Colton Haynes attended the event.
- October 4 – The Iglesia ni Cristo wins two new Guinness world records for the largest audience for a film screening and the largest audience at a film premiere with 43,624 attendees for Felix Manalo.
- October 5 – TV5 and Cignal Digital TV ink a deal with Bloomberg for the launching of Bloomberg TV Philippines, a 24/7 English business news channel.
- October 8 – Ann Lorraine Colis is crowned as Miss Globe 2015.
- October 12 – The Members Church of God International's gospel choir, Ang Dating Daan Chorale, breaks the world record for the largest gospel choir when 8,688 chorale members performed at the Smart-Araneta Coliseum in Quezon City.
- October 24 – Eat Bulaga! holds a benefit concert dubbed as "Sa Tamang Panahon" ("In the Right Time") at the Philippine Arena to raise funds for libraries in certain schools in the Philippines. With sold out tickets, the concert highlights Kalyeserye's Maine Mendoza and Alden Richards or the AlDub love team. The Twitter hashtag #ALDubEBTamangPanahon made 41 million tweets, becoming the most tweeted event in the world for 2015.
- November 6 – Filipina Transgender Trixie Martistela is crowned Miss International Queen on the pageant's coronation night at the Tiffany Show Theater in Pattaya, Thailand.
- November 8 – Jimboy Martin and Miho Nishida are both crowned as the Big Winners of the recently concluded Pinoy Big Brother: 737. The season's big night is held at Albay Astrodome in Legazpi, Albay.
- December 6 – Miss Philippines Angelia Ong is named the 2015 Miss Earth in its coronation night held at the Marx Halle in Vienna, Austria, marking the first time in the pageant's nearly 15-year history that a country has won back-to-back titles.
- December 13 – Actress Denise Laurel is named the second grand winner of Your Face Sounds Familiar held at the Newport Performing Arts Theater at Resorts World Manila.
- December 19 – Brgy. Dolores stands against 10 other barangays and claims their 2nd consecutive title in the 2015 Giant Lantern Festival held in Robinsons Starmills, Pampanga.
- December 20 – Miss Philippines Pia Alonzo Wurtzbach is crowned as the 64th Miss Universe after the pageant rites held in Las Vegas, Nevada, marking the country's third win after Gloria Diaz in 1969 and Margarita Moran-Floirendo in 1973.
- December 31 – Leren Mae Bautista is crowned as the 2015 Miss Tourism Queen International.

== Deaths ==
January

- January 9 – Susan Calo Medina, travel writer and host of Travel Time (b. 1941)
- January 11 – Arturo Pacificador, former assemblyman and board member of Antique (b. 1931)
- January 13 – Raja Muda Agbimuddin Kiram, half-brother of Jamalul Kiram III (b. 1940)

February

- February 13 – Elmer Ramos, Vice Mayor of Maigo, Lanao del Norte

March

- March 4 – Jam Sebastian, part of Jamich, a real-life couple who gained popularity in YouTube (b. 1986)
- March 14 – Liezl Martinez, actress, TV host and MTRCB board member (b. 1967)
- March 27 – Josefino Cenizal, composer, director and actor (b. 1919)

April

- April 1 – Roel Cortez, singer (b. 1967)
- April 14 – Ameril Umbra Kato, founder of the Bangsamoro Islamic Freedom Fighters (b. 1946)
- April 17:
  - Gary Ignacio, vocalist of the Alamid band (b. 1966)
  - Richie D'Horsie, comedian (b. 1957)

May

- May 3 – Abdul Basit Usman, bomb making expert (b. 1974)
- May 8 – Domingo Lucenario Jr., Philippine ambassador to Pakistan (b. 1960)

June

- June 13 – Junix Inocian, actor and comedian (b. 1951)

July

- July 5 – Archie King, CEO of Victoria Court motel chain
- July 7 – Julia Buencamino, actress (b. 1999)
- July 8:
  - Lucita Soriano, TV and movie actress (b. 1941)
  - Robert Campos, movie actor (b. 1940)
- July 17 – Andal Ampatuan Sr., former Governor of Maguindanao and principal suspect in the Maguindanao massacre (b. 1941)
- July 24 – Florenz Regalado, member of the Philippine Constitutional Commission of 1986 and Associate Justice of the Supreme Court of the Philippines (b. 1928)

August

- August 6 – Amado Pineda, former GMA news weatherman and meteorologist (b. 1938)
- August 11 – Arturo Macapagal, former Olympian shooter and brother of former President Gloria Macapagal Arroyo (b. 1942)
- August 17 – Butz Aquino, former Senator and Representative of Makati (b. 1939)

September

- September 19 – Esmail Kiram II, reigning Sultan of Sulu (b. 1939)

October

- October 5 – Joker Arroyo, former senator (b. 1927)
- October 8 – Elizabeth Ramsey, singer, comedian, and mother of Jaya (b. 1931)
- October 10 – Richard F. Heck, American scientist and Nobel laureate in Chemistry (b. 1931)
- October 13 – Rizzini Alexis Gomez, 2012 Miss Tourism International titleholder (b. 1990)
- October 24 – Hasset Go, chef (b. 1986)
- October 29 – Ernesto Herrera, former Senator and Trade Union leader (b. 1942)

November

- November 24 – Niel Tupas Sr., former Iloilo governor (b. 1932)

December

- December 2 – Ignacio Santiago Sr., former governor of Bulacan and Mayor of Valenzuela (b. 1929)
- December 13 – Benedict Anderson, American academic, expert on Southeast Asia and author of Imagined Communities (b. 1936)
- December 21 – Lim Eng Beng, PBA hall-of-fame player and former basketball player of De La Salle Green Archers (b. 1951)
- December 24:
  - Letty Jimenez Magsanoc, editor-in-chief of Philippine Daily Inquirer (1991–2015) (b. 1941)
  - Ron Jacobs, former Philippines men's national basketball team coach (b. 1942)

== See also ==
- List of Philippine films of 2015
- List of years in the Philippines
- Timeline of Philippine history
