= 2015 in Philippine sports =

The following is a list of notable events and developments that are related to Philippine sports in 2015.

== Events ==
=== Athletics ===
- February 1 – Runners of the 2015 Condura Skyway Marathon paid tribute to the 44 SAF troopers who were killed in a clash in Mamasapano, Maguindanao as they salute while passing the soldiers.
- February 15 – 50,000 runners participated in the 2015 Philhealth Nationwide Run with the theme "PhilHealth: Ready, TSeKaP, Go," simultaneously held in major areas in the country.
- February 21 – In half-distance triathlon Domenico Passuello of Italy and Emma Pooley of the United Kingdom won at the Yellow Cab Challenge Philippine Subic-Bataan edition. Passuello won the men's category while Pooley won the women's category of the triathlon event.
- February 28 – Mark Harry Diones bagged four straight gold medals and helped JRU Heavy Bombers to win their fifth straight championship in the NCAA Season 90 track and field competition.
- March 8 – Australian Tim Reed and Great Britain national Parys Edwards claimed the championship title in the inaugural edition of Century Tuna Ironman 70.3 held in Subic Bay, Zambales.
- March 19–21 – Fil-Am Caleb Stuart and Karen Janairo were the top performers in the first National Open Invitational Athletics Cup organized by PATAFA, held in Laguna.
- April 12 – PO1 Dandelion Bumahit won the title as the best finisher in the 21k run of the recently concluded DZMM Takbo 2015 held at the Bonifacio Global City for the benefit of the scholars of the said radio station.
- April 25–26 – Subic Bay hosted the 2015 ASTC Triathlon Asian Cup.
- December 6 – The national finals of the 39th Milo Marathon to be held in Angeles, Pampanga.

=== Basketball ===
- January 1 – Tab Baldwin's four-year contract as head coach of the Philippine national basketball team officially went in force.
- January 9 – Jimmy Alapag, former team captain of the Gilas Pilipinas national team announces his retirement in the Philippine Basketball Association (PBA). Alapag will now spearhead the managerial duties of the Talk N' Text Tropang Texters as team manager and appointed as the commissioner of the newly created Players Commission of FIBA. A few weeks later, Alapag named as the Sportsman of the year by sports website Spin.ph. During the PBA All-Star Weekend, the No. 3 jersey of Alapag of the TNT was officially retired in a simple ceremony.
- January 21 – The San Miguel Beermen claimed their 20th championship title in the PBA franchise history and their first title in the All-Filipino conference in fourteen years after their win against the Alaska Aces in the Game 7 of the 2015 PBA Philippine Cup held at Smart Araneta Coliseum. Forward Arwind Santos named as the Finals MVP.
- January 24 – PBA Legends team and the Malolos team were battled in an exhibition game prior to the opening salvo of the inaugural season of the Filsports Basketball Association held at the Malolos Convention Center.
- February 8 – The "Then" and the "Now" teams of the La Salle Green Archers head-to-head in a charity match for scholarship funds at the Enrique Razon Sports Complex in DLSU-Taft, Manila.

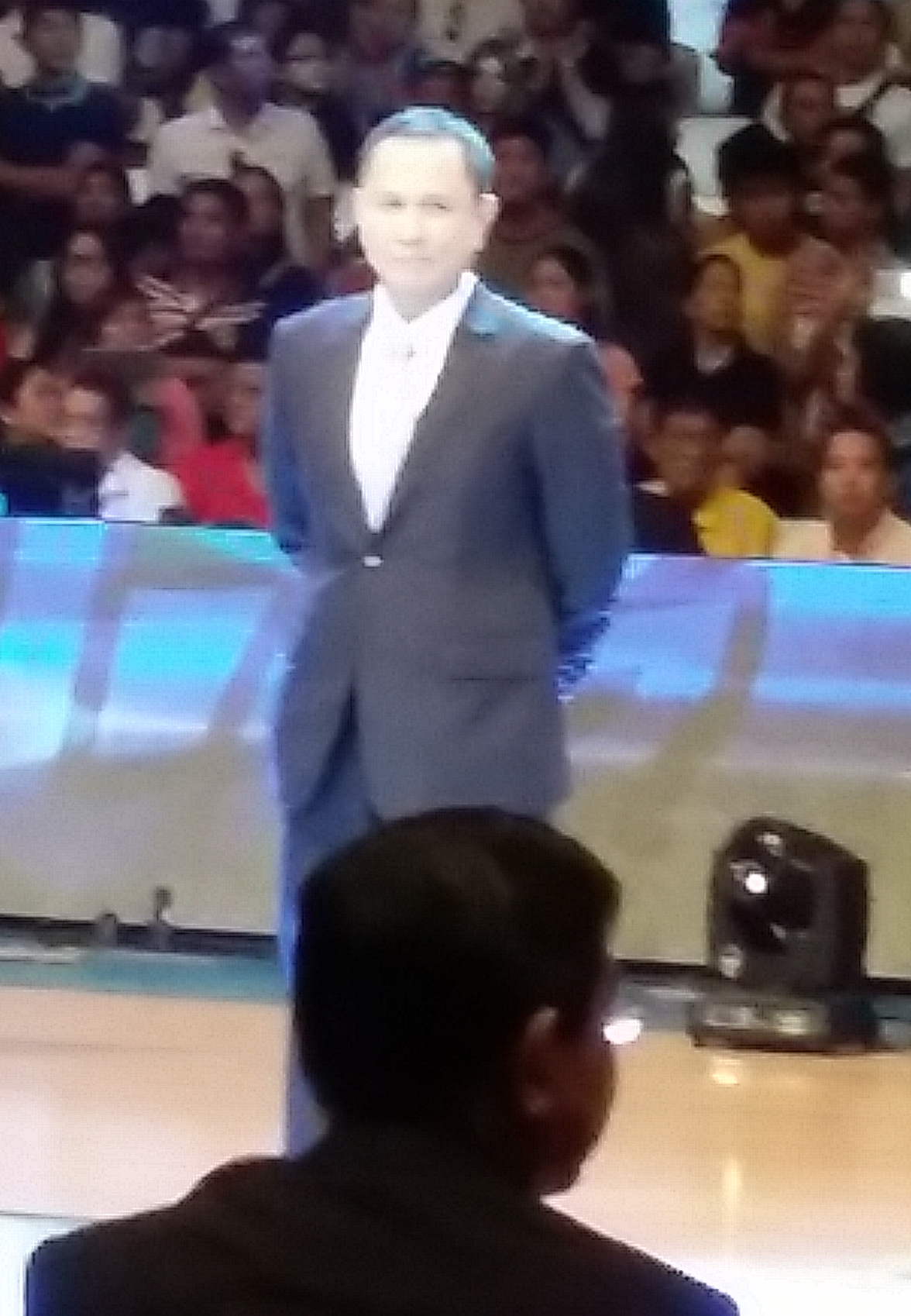
Salud handed a new role as the President and chief executive officer of the PBA after his resignation as the commissioner.

- February 16 – During the press conference, PBA Commissioner Chito Salud announced his retirement on the post after his five-year term reign. However, during the board meeting of the PBA during the All-Star Weekend in Palawan, Salud was reassigned into a new position as the president and CEO, as part of the reorganization of the league.
- February 19 – Hapee Fresh Fighters scored a perfect victory to win their championship title in the 2014–15 PBA D-League Aspirant's Cup Finals. Bobby Ray Parks hailed as the MVP of the Conference.
- February 20
  - The Ateneo Blue Eaglets won their first championship in 4 years in the UAAP Season 77 Junior's Basketball. Finals MVP Jolo Mendoza, Season MVP Mike Nieto and Mythical Five member Matt Nieto led the team to their school's 18th UAAP juniors title, the most in the history of the league.
  - Purefoods Star Hotshots import Daniel Orton was given PHP 250,000 fine by the PBA board after his "joke" remark on Manny Pacquiao's appearance in a game between Kia Carnival and Purefoods.
- February 22 – The Philippine women's national team clinched their third Discovery Women's Basketball Invitational title winning over Papua New Guinea A in the finals.
- March 1 – Collegiate players from the UAAP and NCAA, including Troy Rosario and Jeron Teng and celebrities John Prats and Jhong Hilario took part in a charity basketball game in memory of former San Beda Red Cubs player Coi Mendoza.
- March 2 – Philippine Merchant Marine School Mariners ruled the 2015 NCRAA men's basketball tournament after they beating Olivarez College, in the two-game finals series held at the Makati Coliseum.
- March 6–8 – The annual 2015 PBA All-Star Weekend was held at the Coliseum in Puerto Princesa, Palawan. Rey Guevarra crowned as the Slam Dunk Champion for the second time in a row. In the main event, the South All Stars crown as the dance-off champions, while its rival, the North All Stars won the All Star Game, 166–161. Three Point Shootout king Terrence Romeo hailed as the MVP of the game.
- March 8 – Ateneo de Cebu-Sacred Heart Eagles junior cagers Felix Jaboneta and Zachary Huang lead the team's victory in the 2015 NBTC championship, after they beat the NCAA juniors champion San Beda, 82–78.
- March 15 – Rain or Shine Elasto Painters star Beau Belga went on his scorching mood after his unsportsman-like behavior during the game against Barangay Ginebra San Miguel in the eliminations continuation of the PBA Philippine Cup. Belga fined P70k by the league and he then apologized to the public.
- April 8 – The Philippine Basketball Association (PBA) celebrated their 40th anniversary through their celebratory rites held at the Resorts World Manila. In addition, the PBA recognized 40 greatest players played for the league in 4 decades.
- April 14–19 – Cagayan de Oro hosts the 2015 SEABA Under-16 Championship.
- May 1 – The Philippines swept the 2015 SEABA Championship to win their 7th title of the tournament.
- May 5 – The 2015 Philippine Basketball Association Governors' Cup will be the third and last conference of the 2014-15 PBA season. The tournament will begin on May 5, 2015, and scheduled to finish around August 2015.
- May 14 – Chito Narvasa was named as the newest PBA commissioner, replacing Chito Salud. Narvasa will start his work on the start of Season 41 of the said league.
- May 18 – NCAA signed a new 10-year contract with ABS-CBN. It marks the return of the league on the said network after a 3-year deal contract with TV5. It will be shown on ABS-CBN Sports+Action Channel 23.
- June 8 – UCLA-commit Kobe Paras successfully defended his title in the FIBA 3x3 Slam Dunk Contest in Hungary, fending off challengers from the United States, Uruguay, and the host nation.
- July 17 – The San Miguel Beermen pulled off a rare four-game sweep after outclassing Alaska, 91–81, in the 2015 PBA Governors’ Cup Finals at Smart Araneta Coliseum.
- August 1–2 – The Asia Pacific Masters leg of the FIBA 3X3 World Tour to be hosted in Manila.
- August 7 – In a vote of 14 against 7, China won the bidding against the Philippines for the hosting rights of the 2019 FIBA World Cup held in Tokyo, Japan.
- August 20–23 – LeBron James returned to the country for the second time for his share for "Nike Rise" developmental program.
- August 26 – President Aquino III signed the Republic Act 10676 or more known as the Student-Athletes Protection Act that lead to the removal of the 2-year residency rules in collegiate leagues including UAAP.
- August 29 – September 6 – Philippine national men's basketball team won the silver medal of the 2015 William Jones Cup held at Taipei, Taiwan as preparations for the FIBA Asia Championship. Gilas ended with a record of 6 wins, and 2 losses.
- September 4 – The NAASCU Season 15 was formally opened at the Cuneta Astrodome with two basketball games as the main salvo.
- September 5 – Reigning NBA MVP Stephen Curry was arrived in the Philippines as part of his five-city road tour across Asia for his endorsed clothing brand Under Armour.
- September 11–13 – Quezon City hosted the 2015 MVP Cup.
- October 8 – Business magnate Manny Pangilinan announced that he will retire as the president of the Samahang Basketbol ng Pilipinas (SBP), to pave way to the new leaders of the basketball NSA.
- September 23 – October 3 – Philippine men's national basketball team won the silver medal in the 2015 FIBA Asia Championship. China officially got the ticket for the 2016 Summer Olympics.
- October 29 – The Letran Knights claimed their NCAA Season 91 men's basketball crown against the San Beda Red Lions in the Game 3 of the NCAA Season 91 held at Mall of Asia Arena. Diminutive guard Mark Cruz was named the Finals MVP.
- December 2 – The FEU Tamaraws were crowned the UAAP Season 78 men's basketball champions after clinching a 67–62 victory over the UST Growling Tigers in a winner-take-all Game 3 for the title at the Mall of Asia Arena.

=== Boxing ===
- February 7 – Pinoy Pride 29: Fists of Fury at USEP Gym, Davao City: Jason Pagara knocks-out Cesar Chavez, for two straight times during the early rounds. Pagara defended his WBO International junior welterweight title. Genesis Servania wins a unanimous decision over Juan Luis Hernandez.
- March 28 – Pinoy Pride 30: D-Day at Araneta Coliseum, Quezon City: Nonito Donaire made his come back return after he knock-down William Prado during the second round. Donnie Nietes also knocks-out Gilberto Parra in rounds 8 and 9 for a 10th-round technical knockout to retained his WBO light flyweight crown. Albert Pagara wins a TKO over Rodolfo Hernandez to defend his IBF Intercontinental junior featherweight title.

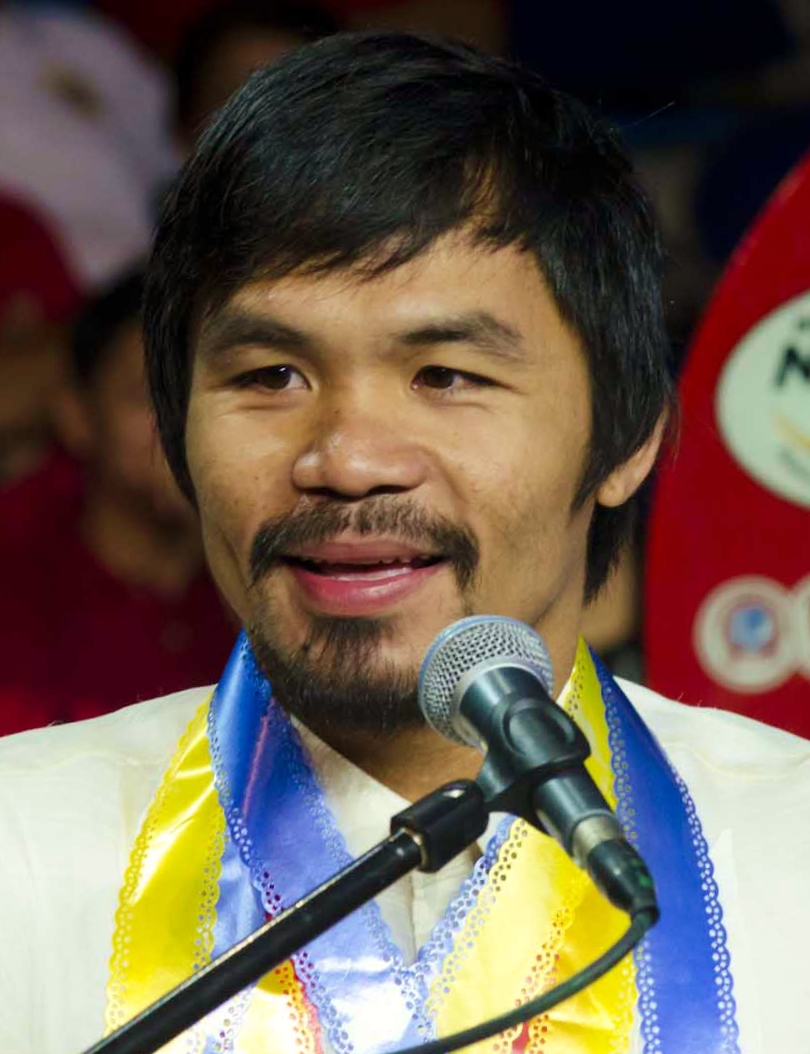
Manny Pacquiao lost the boxing match, dubbed "Fight of the Century", against Floyd Mayweather Jr.

- May 3 – Dubbed as the "Battle for Greatness" or as the "Fight of the Century," Floyd Mayweather Jr. kept his undefeated fight record after he had defeated Manny Pacquiao via a unanimous decision in a match held at the MGM Grand Garden Arena, Las Vegas, Nevada.
- July 12 – Donnie Nietes, known as the longest-reigning Filipino boxing champion, won the title defense against Mexico's Francisco Rodriguez via majority decision in Cebu.
- July 19 – Nonito Donaire made short work of his French opponent, stopping Anthony Settoul in just two rounds of their 10-round bout at the Cotai Arena in Macau.
- October 18 – Pinoy Pride 33: Philippines vs. The World at StubHub Center in Carson, California, Donnie Nietes, Albert and Jason Pagara and Mark Magsayo are all emerged victorious against their Latino counterparts.
- December 12 – Nonito Donaire defeats Mexican boxer Cesar Juarez to claim the vacant WBO super bantamweight title in Puerto Rico.

=== Cheerdance, streetdance, and dancesport ===
- February 8 – The University of the Philippines Streetdance Club proclaimed as the champions of the UAAP Season 77 Streetdance Competition held at the MOA Arena, Pasay. UPSDC is one of the prominent dance clubs in the country.
- March 1 – The National University Pep Squad, under the coaching duties of former FEU cheerdancer Ghicka Bernabe crowned as the National Champions of the 2015 National Cheerleading Championship that was held at the MOA Arena. Cheering squad from School of the Holy Spirit, Quezon City also won for the High School division.
- October 3 – The NU Pep Squad won their third straight title in the 2015 UAAP Cheerdance Competition held in the SM Mall of Asia Arena and well attended by more than 26,000 spectators.

=== Cycling ===
- February 1–4 – The 6th edition of the Le Tour de Filipinas was kicked off in the Luzon-wide route. Air 21-backed LTDF is the only-Filipino cycling tournament sanctioned by the Union Cycliste Internationale.
- February 4 – Mark Galedo of the 7-Eleven team failed to defend his title in the 2015 LTDF as French cyclist Thomas Lebas of Bridgestone Anchor Cycling Team won the overall title of the competition.
- February 11–27 – The fifth year of the Ronda Pilipinas has commenced. Two qualifying rounds were held in Visayas, and Luzon within February 11 to 17. Mindanao qualifiers was cancelled due to the recent clash in Mamasapano, Maguindanao.
- February 27 – Philippine Navy-Standard Insurance cyclist Santy Barnachea beaten the odds for his win of the 2nd title in the 2015 LBC Ronda Pilipinas.
- December 12 – The Clark Green City hosted the inaugural CGC Bike It Up Challenge.

=== Collegiate sports ===
- February 8–14 – The 2015 State Colleges and Universities Athletic Association National Olympics was held at the Cagayan Province. Participants from the state-owned universities and colleges in the country will be compete in the 6-day games.
- March 4 – Junel Baculi, has formally resigned on his post as the Athletics Director of the National University. His resignation was effective right after UAAP Season 77 closes.
- March 10 – College of Saint Benilde Blazers was retained their general championship title for the senior's division of NCAA for Season 90. San Beda also retain their title in the junior's division.
- June 27 – The 91st season of the National Collegiate Athletic Association (NCAA) with the theme "Engineered For Sports Excellence In The New Decade" was commenced at the Mall of Asia Arena.
- September 5 – The UAAP Season 78 was opened. The University of the Philippines become the season's host.
- December 4–7 – 2015 Asia Pacific University Games in Cebu City.

=== Golf ===
- January 9 – Jobim Carlos won the Philippine Amateur Stroke Play championship against Rupert Zaragosa at the Eagle Ridge in General Trias.
- February 22 – Tommy Manotoc, then-president of the National Golf Association of the Philippines leads Canlubang to a win in the PAL Interclub Seniors Golf Cup in Lapu-Lapu City, Cebu.

=== Football ===
- March 3 – The Philippine Azkals partnered with the Azkals Foundation and Puregold launched the "Patak-Patak para sa Pangarap" coinbank fundraising campaign to shoulder their expenses for the bidding of the 2018 FIFA World Cup qualifiers.
- March 8–9 – FEU Tamaraws' men's, women's, and junior's football teams gave a triple crown championship titles, in their respective divisions, in the conclusion of the UAAP Season 77 Football tournament.
- April 9–11 – Football Manila, composed of aspiring footballers from different parts of the country will compete in the Ford-World Football Fives Championships in Dubai, United Arab Emirates. The tournament is a five-a-side tournament
- April 15 – The first football match at the Philippine Sports Stadium was held. Global defeated Yadanarbon from Myanmar in a match that ended in a 4–1 scoreline. The match is part of the group stage of the 2015 AFC Cup.

=== Taekwondo ===
- February 28 – March 1 – Filipino taekwando jins was competed up against foreign antagonists in the country's hosting of the Asia-Pacific Taekwondo Invitational Championships held at SM City Iloilo. After the tournament, the Philippine team scored 3 golds and 3 silver medals.

=== Tennis ===
- February – The Men's and Women's teams of the National University claimed their respective crowns in the conclusion of the UAAP Season 77 tennis tournament.

=== Volleyball ===
- January 23 – The Arellano Lady Chiefs won their first NCAA Volleyball championship title since their affiliation in the league started in 2009 after their Game 2 triumph on the NCAA Season 90 Finals. Lady Chiefs won against the San Sebastian Lady Stags, in straight sets. Cristine Joy Rosario, Angelica Legacion, and Finals MVP Menchie Tubiera has been helping out in the Lady Chiefs' victory.
- February 11–15 – For the second time, The NCAA holds their Season 90 Beach Volleyball Competition in the Subic Bay Freeport Zone. Men's, women's and junior teams from the 10-man members of the NCAA competed in the 5-day event. San Sebastian College's Gretchel Soltones and Camille Uy were hailed as the winners of the Women's Division.
- March 1 – The first leg of the Tanduay Light Beach Volleyball Tournament was held at the Cantada Sports Center, Taguig. Philippine Army tandem of Jovelyn Gonzaga and Nerissa Bautista proclaimed as the winners. On the same day, Edgardo "Boy" Cantada elected as the new president of the PVF.
- March 7 – Ateneo Blue Eagles grabbed their first ever title in the UAAP as they win, up against NU Bulldogs in the Finals series of the UAAP Season 77 Men's Volleyball tournament. Setter Ish Polvorosa and MVP Marck Espejo were the key players in their first title since 1976 when the Ateneo crowned as men's volleyball champions of the NCAA.
- March 7, March 11 – La Salle lady spikers Victonara Galang and Camille Cruz suffered their season-ending injuries in the penultimate matches before the Game 2 of the UAAP Season 77 Women's Volleyball Finals.
- March 12 – Filipino-American setter Iris Tonelada named as the first overall pick for the Philips Gold team in the PSL Draft held at the SM Aura, Taguig.
- March 14 – The Ateneo Lady Eagles has won their second straight championship of the UAAP Women's Volleyball in the Season 77 Finals. Alyssa Valdez named as the Most Valuable Player of the season, while Amy Ahomiro claimed her Finals MVP award.
- March 21 – The LVPI, announced during the opening of the 2015 PSL All-Filipino Conference, the 15 aspirants for the training pool of the U23 national team.
- May 1–9 – The Philippines hosted the first 2015 Asian U23 Women's Volleyball Championship. The Philippines placed seventh.
- May 14 – Petron Blaze Spikers was claimed their back-to-back victory after the team won the Finals title of the 2015 PSL All-Filipino Conference after beating Shopinas.com Lady Clickers during set 4. Former FEU star Rachel Daquis proclaimed as the MVP.
- November 29 – December 3 – The Inaugural Spike For Peace Women's International Beach Volleyball was hosted at the PhilSports Arena in Pasig, Metro Manila, Philippines. Akiko Hasegawa and Ayumi Kusano of Japan won the finals.

=== Other sports ===
- January 25, Horse racing – "Malaya" (Sky Mesa / Dreambride) (owner: Mayor Benhur Abalos / trainer: Ruben Tupas / jockey: J.B. Hernandez won the 2015 Philracom Commissioner's Cup in honor of former commissioners Franco Loyola and Reynaldo Fernando at the Metro Turf Club.
- February 1, Cockfighting – Gerry Ramos, the proprietor of the AAO Gamefarm, proclaimed as the champion of the 2015 World Slasher Cup I 8-Cock Invitational Derby.
- February 15, Horse racing – Mandaluyong Mayor Benhur Abalos-owned Hagdang Bato (awarded as the horse of the year), leading the awardees in the 17th PHILTOBO Gintong Lahi Awards that was held at the Metro Manila Turf Club.
- February 21, Billiards – Taiwanese billiard player Ko Pin Yi captured his first world billiard title on the finals of the MP 10-Ball World Cup held at SM City General Santos.
- February 22, Chess – Filipino Grandmaster Wesley So struck his first title for 2015 as he ruled the 2nd Bunratty Classic Chess Tournament held in Ireland.
- February 26 – March 1, Motorsport – The Shell Eco-marathon Asia, a racing competition for environmental-friendly cars invented by engineering students in Asia-Pacific was held at the Quirino Grandstand, Manila.
- February 28, American football – The Pilipinas Aguilas succumbed to Korean Tigers who won their friendly match held at the Emperador Stadium, Taguig, 38–33.
- March 8, Polo – British polo pro Max Charlton lead the Los Tamaros for their come-from-behind win in the 2015 Globalport Philippine Polo Open Finals.
- March 21, Motorsport – The first leg of the Toyota Vios Cup was kickedoff at the Clark International Speedway, Pampanga. Celebrities including Jasmine Curtis-Smith, Derek Ramsay, Kylie Padilla, Rhian Ramos, Phoemela Baranda, among others was invited to join the competition.
- April 16–18, Billiards – The Philippines will host for the second time the AM8.com Queens Cup, a competition featuring international female billiards players. The event will be held at the Resorts World Manila.
- April 24, Mixed Martial Arts – ONE Championship: Valor of Champions will be a mixed martial arts event held by ONE Championship. The event will be held at the Mall of Asia Arena in Pasay, Philippines.
- April 28 – May 3, Touch Football – The Philippine national touch football team, composed of both men and women and collectively known as Philippine Pythons, competed in the Touch Football World Cup held in New South Wales, Australia.
- May 3–9, Multi-sport – The City of Tagum of the province Davao del Norte hosted the 2015 Palarong Pambansa. More than 12,000 student-athletes, coaches, and officials from 17 regions participated in the multi-sports event.
- May 3, 6, 9, Rugby – Several rugby teams including Philippine Volcanoes will head-to-head in the country's hosting of the 2015 Asian Rugby Championships at the Philippine Sports Stadium.
- May 16, Mixed Martial Arts – Frankie Edgar defeated Urijah Faber via unanimous decision on the main fight of the first UFC event in the country, UFC Fight Night: Manila held at the MOA Arena. Mark Muñoz gave his final farewell fight also on the event.
- June 5–16, Multi-sport – The country's athletes competed in the 2015 Southeast Asian Games in Singapore. The Philippines placed sixth overall, earning 29 gold, 36 silver and 66 bronze medals.
- June 20–21, Motorsport – Monster trucks El Toro Loco and Grave Digger showcased their stunts in the Manila leg of the Monster Jam tour held at the Mall of Asia Arena.
- July 19, Dragon boat – The Philippine Army Dragon Boat Team won gold at the men's 250-meter race event of the 2015 Japan Dragon Boat Championships held at the Okawa River in Osaka, Japan. The Philippine Army finished first ahead of the runners-up Japanese national team and 16 other teams.
- July 25–26, Multi-sport – The Iglesia ni Cristo staged the first international championships of its multi-sports federation known as Unity Games as one of the highlights of its anniversary commemoration.
- August 28, Fencing – Proclaimed actor and once playing volleyball and rowing, Richard Gomez won the gold medal in the 2015 Asian Master's Fencing Championship held at the PhilSports Arena.
- September 19–20, Chess – The commencement of 2015 Shell National Youth Active Chess Championship, was held at the SM Megamall Activity Center with the participation of 48 chess players.
- December 6–8, Tennis – The 2015 International Premier Tennis League season of Philippine Mavericks was held in Mall of Asia Arena.

== Sports governing bodies ==
- January 25 – The Philippine Volleyball Federation holding their own elections for the federation's board, without an observer representing the POC. PVF President Karl Chan received the most votes for a seat in the board.
- March 2 – PSC and POC executives, together with Pampanga congressman Yeng Guiao and Davao Del Norte congressman Anthony del Rosario inspected the 50-hectare property in Clark Freeport Zone for the initial construction of the National Training Center.

== Records and recognitions ==
- January 1, Boxing – Donnie Nietes, now recognized as the "longest reigning Filipino world boxing champion" (7 years and 3 months), beating the record set by Gabriel Elorde.
- February 16 – Athlete of the Year and 2014 Asian Games gold medalist for BMX cycling, Daniel Caluag leads the 73 awardees in the recently concluded 2014 PSA Annual Awards held at the One Espanade, Pasay.

== Deaths ==
January

- January 17 – Woodraw Enriquez, Liga Pilipinas MVP (b.1977)

February

- February 15 – Coi Mendoza, former San Beda Red Cubs player (b.1991)

March

- March 8 – Ramil Cruz, assistant coach and ex-player of the UP Fighting Maroons basketball team (b.1966)
- March 17 – Servillano A. Padiz Jr., father of Philippine sepak takraw. (b.1937)

April

- April 6 – Irineo Federigan, former softball national player (b.1937)
- April 24 – Rene Adad, president of the Philippine Football Federation (b.1928)

May

- May 24 – CJ Servillon, JRU Heavy Bombers junior player (b.1998)

July

- July 27 – Liza Paglinawan, former national volleyball player (b.1965)

August

- August 2 – Edward "Chaya" Lim, Davao F.A. President (b.1958).
- August 11 – Arturo Macapagal, former Olympian shooter and brother of former president Gloria Macapagal Arroyo (b. 1942)
- August 13 – Stacey Villar, footballer (b.2000).
- August 16 – Ale Cali, Pacific Xtreme Combat flyweight champion
- August 18 – Eddie Withwell, team captain of Nomads U17 football team (b. 1999)

September

- September 10 – Jose "Jun" Castro, Jr, former Philippine Sports Commission commissioner and the first Milo Marathon's race director (b. 1944)
- September 30 – Rene Cruz, former Philippine Olympic Committee president (1992–1996) (b.1930)

October

- October 31 – Edgardo Gomez, former NCAA basketball player (b. 1942)

December

- December 12 – Erick Canlas, former PBA player (b. 1980)
- December 21 – Lim Eng Beng, PBA hall-of-fame player and former basketball player of De La Salle Green Archers (b. 1951)
- December 24 — Ron Jacobs, former Philippines men's national basketball team coach (b. 1942)

== See also ==
- 2015 in the Philippines
- 2015 in sports
