= 2015 Asia Pacific University Games =

- Nations: 3
- Events: 3
- Opening: December 4, 2015
- Closing: December 7, 2015
- Opened by: David Ong; FESSAP Executive President
- Athlete's Oath: Dannel Jay Tormis
- Main venue: Cebu Coliseum

The 2015 Asia Pacific University Games was hosted in Cebu City, Philippines. The hosting university of the inaugural games will be the University of Cebu.

The Cebu Coliseum was the venue of the opening ceremony of the games and the men's basketball tournament, the Cebu Capitol Social Hall hosted Table tennis while badminton was played at Metro Sports in Salinas Drive.

== Participants ==
Universities from three countries participated. Australia, South Korea, New Zealand, Papua New Guinea, and Chinese Taipei were to participate but withdrew from the competition.

Nation	Representing Universities	No. of Universities
Japan	Nippon Sport Science University	1
Malaysia	Universiti Teknologi MARA	1
Philippines (host)	University of Cebu	4
Philippines (host)	Cebu Institute of Technology-University	4
Philippines (host)	University of San Carlos	4
Philippines (host)	University of Southern Philippines Foundation	4

== Sports ==
- Badminton
- Basketball
- Table tennis

== Results ==
=== Badminton ===
Participating Universities

- (Philippines) University of Cebu
- (Philippines) University of San Carlos
- (Malaysia) Universiti Teknologi MARA

2015 APUG Badminton events
Event		Winners		
Event		1st place, gold medalist(s)	2nd place, silver medalist(s)	3rd place, bronze medalist(s)
Singles	Men's	Zairul Nizam (UiTM-MAS)	Michael Quibranza (USC-PHI)	Christian Paul Cayna (USC-PHI)
Singles	Men's	Zairul Nizam (UiTM-MAS)	Michael Quibranza (USC-PHI)	Pakhrur Shah (UiTM-MAS)
Singles	Women's	Donetta Moisol (UiTM-MAS)	Lydia Habirin (UiTM-MAS)	Jenny Rose Ramirez (UC-PHI)
Singles	Women's	Donetta Moisol (UiTM-MAS)	Lydia Habirin (UiTM-MAS)	Shemae Cabaluna (UC-PHI)
Doubles	Men's	Zairul Nizam; Pakhrur Shah (UiTM-MAS)	Dexter Opalla; Aljun Pinote (UC-PHI)	Scott Weel Busano; Gideon Obesmares (USC-PHI)
Doubles	Men's	Zairul Nizam; Pakhrur Shah (UiTM-MAS)	Dexter Opalla; Aljun Pinote (UC-PHI)	Benny Pelito; Christian Paul Cayna (USC-PHI)
Doubles	Women's	Lydia Habirin; Donetta Moisol (UiTM-MAS)	Hannah Alyssa Quibranza; Jomarie Alterado (USC-PHI)	Shemae Cabaluna; Jenny Rose Ramirez (UC-PHI)
Doubles	Women's	Lydia Habirin; Donetta Moisol (UiTM-MAS)	Hannah Alyssa Quibranza; Jomarie Alterado (USC-PHI)	Sheira Nabua; Aeryn Opsima (USC-PHI)

=== Basketball ===
Team	Pld	W	L	PF	PA	PD	Pts
(Japan) NSSU Lions	4	4	0	0	0	0	8
(Philippines) UC Webmasters	4	3	1	0	0	0	7
(Philippines) USPF Panthers	4	2	2	0	0	0	6
(Philippines) USC Warriors	4	1	3	0	0	0	5
Malaysia-UTM	4	0	4	0	0	0	4

2015 Asia Pacific University Games basketball winners
(Japan)
Japan
NSSU Lions
1st title

December 4

Report

USC Warriors (Philippines)	79–57	Malaysia-UTM
Pts: Pepito, 15		Pts: Mokles, Baharudin, 12

USC Gym, Cebu City

December 4

Report

UC Webmasters (Philippines)	83–90	(Japan) NSSU Lions
Pts: Jabello, 21		Pts: Sekido, 18

USC Gym, Cebu City

December 5
08:00

Report

USC Warriors (Philippines)	65–73	(Philippines) UC Webmasters
Pts: Pepito, 17		Pts: Dacalos, Jabello, 13

USPF Gym, Cebu City

December 5
09:30

Report

USPF Panthers (Philippines)	71–74	(Japan) NSSU Lions

USPF Gym, Cebu City

December 5
14:00

Report

Malaysia-UTM	61–66	(Philippines) UC Webmasters
Pts: Puerto, 12

USPF Gym, Cebu City

December 5
15:30

Report

USPF Panthers (Philippines)	74–61	(Philippines) USC Warriors

USPF Gym, Cebu City

December 5

Report

USPF Panthers (Philippines)	91–86 (OT)	Malaysia-UTM
Pts: Obenza, 32

USPF Gym, Cebu City

December 5

Report

USC Warriors (Philippines)	70–73	(Japan) NSSU Lions
Pts: Magat, 10		Pts: Sekido, 16

USPF Gym, Cebu City

December 6
14:00

Report

UC Webmasters (Philippines)	74–66	(Philippines) USPF Panthers
Pts: Puerto, Delator 16		Pts: Borces 11

Cebu City

December 6
15:30

Report

NSSU Lions (Japan)	69–51	Malaysia-UTM

Cebu City

=== Table tennis ===
2015 APUG Table tennis events
Event		Winners		
Event		1st place, gold medalist(s)	2nd place, silver medalist(s)	3rd place, bronze medalist(s)
Team	Men's	University of Cebu (PHI)	Universiti Teknologi MARA (MAS)	Cebu Institute of Technology-University (PHI)
Team	Women's	University of Cebu (PHI)	Universiti Teknologi MARA (MAS)	Cebu Institute of Technology-University (PHI)
Individual		Unknown		

== Medal table ==
Host nation

Rank	Nation	Gold	Silver	Bronze	Total
1	Malaysia (MAS)	4	3	1	8
2	Philippines (PHI)*	2	4	10	16
3	Japan (JPN)	1	0	0	1
Totals (3 entries)		7	7	11	25

Incomplete, results of the individual table tennis events are unknown.
