= Caraga candy poisonings =

Food contamination event in the Philippines

2015 Caraga candy poisonings
- Date: July 15, 2015
- Location: Caraga, Philippines
- Cause: Tainted candy
- Casualties: 1,925 (as of July 13, 2015)
- Deaths: 21
- Arrests: 9

Almost 2,000 people, mostly schoolchildren from the Caraga region of the Philippines, experienced food poisoning after consuming durian, mangosteen, and mango flavored candies in 2015. The Food and Drug Administration of the Philippines confirmed that the sweets were contaminated by staphylococcus bacteria, a bacteria commonly found on human skin. The cause was suspected to be accidental bacterial contamination by vendors, who had repackaged the candy.

== Victims ==
Most of the victims of the food poisoning incident were schoolchildren within the Caraga Region. Victims reported experiencing symptoms such as diarrhea, dizziness, and stomachaches. The cases were reported by at least nine health facilities based in Surigao del Sur, Surigao del Norte and Agusan del Sur. At least 10 people were hospitalized.

The first cases were reported in Cagwait, Surigao del Sur in the morning of July 10.

Food poisoning symptoms were reported in a dozen towns.

== Response ==
Acting Davao City Mayor Paolo Duterte ordered an urgent investigation on July 10 regarding the matter to determine the exact cause of the candy contamination incident.

On July 11, 2015, the Department of Health in Caraga declared a food poisoning outbreak in the region. Hospitals across the Caraga Region were put into white alert in response to the incident.

== Investigation ==
The Food and Drug Administration (FDA) conducted microbiological tests on the samples of the contaminated candies. The FDA had suspected that the candies were contaminated by E. coli, Salmonella or staphylococcus based on the reported symptoms by victims of the food poisoning incident. They announced that the candy samples tested positive for staphylococcus aureus.

The FDA traced the contaminated candies' origin to two manufacturing facilities in Davao City. The FDA linked two candy manufacturers to the incident based on labels found on the food products, one which is licensed with the food safety authority, and the other manufacturer, Wendy's Durian Candies was not in the database of the FDA. The Davao City government suspended the business permit of Wendy's Durian Candies until the business secured a clearance from the FDA.

Janet Aquino, a member of the Aquino family, which produces Wendy's Durian Candies, said the candies were apparently repacked when she saw the candies made by her company in a news report. The contaminated candies' packages included cut-up portions of the original label of the products.

=== Arrests ===
Twelve men and women linked to the incident were arrested. The arrested were identified as vendors; Junnil Martinez, John Oben, Joel Pasa, Richard Rivera Jr., Martinez Bocaycay, Genelyn Pasa, Junnel Teriote, John Dequilla, Henryto Amoguis, and three more people whose names were not disclosed.

Pasa, 26, and Amoguis, 21, from Davao City and Valencia, Bukidnon respectively, were seen selling the contaminated candies at the Special Education Elementary School in Tandag. The same vendors were also believed to have sold the candies in Aras-Arasan in Cagwait and Carrascal.

One of those arrested, Dequilla, had been a client of Wendy's Durian Candies for at least two years. Aquino, representing the candy manufacturer, said that Dequilla ordered 300 bags of 100-piece packs of candies on July 7 to be delivered to Tandag in Surigao del Sur, and noted that it was the first time he asked for the candies to be delivered to the town.
