= Philippine Army Dragon Boat Team =

Army Dragon Warriors
- Team Logo
- Sport: Dragon boat
- Based in: Manila, Philippines
- Owner: Philippine Army
- Head coach: Sgt. Usman Anterola (as of 2015)
- Manager: Lt. Col. Harold Cabunoc (as of 2015)
- Assistant coach: SSg. Romy John Dionio (as of 2015)
- Drummer: Sgt. Reynaldo Baylon (as of 2015)
- Steersman: MSG. Franco Tinoco (as of 2015)
- Federation: Philippine Dragon Boat Federation
- Website: Official Facebook Page

The Philippine Army Dragon Boat Team is a dragon boat sports club affiliated with Philippine Army. The sporting team is a member of the Philippine Dragon Boat Federation.

== History ==
=== 2011 IDBF Dragonboat World Championship ===
After being booted out of the Philippine National Team in 2010, the Army athletes organized the Philippine Army Dragon Boat Team (Dragon Boat Paddling Club) whose members are all active duty soldier-athletes of the Special Services Unit (currently known as the Special Services Center). Since then, the club participated and dominated both local and international competitions (Indonesia and Malaysia).

Seven members of the Philippine Army Dragon Boat Team were called up to be part of the Pinoy Dragon Warriors team which participated at the 2011 IDBF Dragonboat World Championship which was held in Tampa, Florida in the United States. The team won 5 golds and 2 silvers at the said competition.

=== 2014 IDBF Club Crews World Championship ===
The Philippine Army competed at the 9th IDBF Club Crews World Championship which was hosted at the Standiana Rowing Center in Ravena, Italy. The Philippine Army had lack of funds to send a team to the championships where they had qualified for, having no tickets to Italy two days before they flew out for the race on August 31. Team president, Lt. Col Harold Cabunoc planned to withdraw participation for the team if they fail to receive the remaining balance of 2 million pesos for the expenses of the trip. Philippine Army managed to find sponsors through, Intermed Philippines which sponsored half of the team's finances, the Armed Forces of the Philippines and friends of the members of the team.

The Philippine Army team participated in three events at the tournament which began on September 3, 2014. They failed to achieve a podium finish at their opening event, the 2 kilometer race, after they collided with Team Netherlands during the race and they finished seventh. The team later won gold and set new competition records at two events the 200 meters Premier Open (47.85 seconds) and the 500 meters Premier Open (2:06.76) where they beat the runner-up team based in Germany.

=== 2015 Japan Dragon Boat Championships ===
The Philippine Army Dragon Boat Team was officially registered at the Securities and Exchange Commission as the Army Dragon Warriors Inc. Lt. Col. Harold M Cabunoc was voted by the club members as the President.

The Philippine Army participated at the 2015 Japan Dragon Boat Championships which was held on July 19, 2015, at the Okawa River in Osaka, Japan. The tournament was contested by 70 teams.

The team participated at the men's 250 meter race where it finished first out of 17 teams. The Army paddlers registered an average heat time of 53 seconds. At final 100 meters they paddled against the current of the Okawa River beating runners-up the Japanese national team by one second.

== Army Dragon Warriors Inc. Membership Roll ==
Army Dragon Warriors Inc. Officials and Members
Army Rank	Paddler
Sergeant	Reynaldo Baylon (Drummer)
Staff Sergeant	Salvador Sumagaysay (Steersman)
Staff Sergeant	Joemar Ocquiana
Staff Sergeant	Ronald Tan
Sergeant	Elwin Juan
Sergeant	Jomon Ocquiana
Staff Sergeant	Rodrigo Tanuan Jr.
Sergeant	Romel Anote
Sergeant	Domingo Bagni
Corporal	Pajiri Sahibad
Corporal	Sonny Boy Bendebel
Corporal	Ramie Llano
Corporal	Gerald Dela Cruz
Private First Class	Alvin Sabijon
Private First Class	Reyjel Paranaque
Corporal	Jose Ijalo
Corporal	Gil Martin Gonzales
Corporal	Hardy Pabulayan
Corporal	Arnie Cafe
Private First Class	Leomar Mirasol
Staff
President: Lt. Col. Harold Cabunoc; Head Coach: SSgt. Usman Anterola; Assistant Coach: SSg. Romy John Dionio
References:Rappler

== Honors ==
2014 International Dragon Boat Federation Club Crews World Championships (in Ravenna, Italy)

- (gold) Gold: Small Boat, 200m Premier Open and 500m Premier Open events

2015 Japan Dragon Boat Championships (in Osaka, Japan)

- (gold) Gold: Men's 250 meter race
