= Civil Aeronautics Board (Philippines) =

Government agency of the Philippines

- Lupon sa Aeronautika Sibil
- Official seal of the Civil Aeronautics Board of the Philippines

Agency overview
- Formed: 5 December 1932; 93 years ago
- Jurisdiction: Government of the Philippines
- Headquarters: Old MIA Road, Pasay, Metro Manila
- Employees: 102 (2024)
- Annual budget: ₱262.38 million (2026)
- Agency executives: Carmelo L. Arcilla, Executive Director; Porvenir P. Porciuncula, Deputy Executive Director
- Parent agency: Department of Transportation
- Website: www.cab.gov.ph

The Civil Aeronautics Board (CAB; Filipino: Lupon sa Aeronautika Sibil) is a government agency of the Philippines attached to the Department of Transportation tasked to regulate, promote and develop the economic aspect of air transportation in the Philippines and to ensure that existing CAB policies are adapted to the present and future air commerce of the Philippines.

The Board has supervisory and jurisdictional control over air carriers, general sales agents, cargo sales agents, and air freight forwarders, as well as their property, property rights, equipment, facilities and franchises.
