= Philippine Nurse Licensure Examination =

Standardized exam for aspiring nurses

The Philippine Nurse Licensure Examination is a 500-item multiple choice exam to test basic nursing level competency which considers the objectives of the nursing curriculum, the broad areas of nursing and other related disciplines and competencies. It is held every June and December annually in various public schools throughout the Philippines. Room assignment for the exams are posted outside the Professional Regulation Commission building at least three days before the exam.

== Qualifications ==
At the time of filing the application for the examination of nurses, the applicant must:

1. Be a citizen of the Philippines, or a citizen or a subject of a country which permits Filipino nurses to practice within its territorial limits on the same basis of the subject or citizen of such country, provided that the requirements for the registration or licensing or nurses in said country are substantially the same as those prescribed in this RA 9173.
2. Be of good moral character
3. Holder of a bachelor's degree in Nursing from a college or university that complies with the standards of nursing education duly recognized by the proper government agency.

== Ratings ==
In order to pass the examination, an examinee must obtain a general average of at least seventy five percent (75%) with a rating of not below sixty percent (60%) in any of five test subjects.

== Coverage ==
The scope or scope of the examination for the practice of nursing in the Philippines shall be determined by the Board. For the December 2007 examination, the Board of Nursing has released the detailed scope of nursing to the deans of the nursing colleges and universities of the Philippines through the Association of Deans of Philippine Colleges of Nursing (ADPCN).

== June 2006 examination controversy ==
The controversy stemmed from the complaint of 92 examinees alleging leakage of questions in the nursing board examination. The complainants asked the Professional Regulation Commission to nullify the affected sections to preserve the integrity of the licensure examination.

The 92 complainants were later joined by 425 intervenors.[cite]

Examinees told the Senate and House of Representatives that on both days of the exam, they saw other examinees wearing white jackets with R.A. Gapuz Review Center printed on the back reading photocopies of what she would later discover were leaked questions from the review center.

The controversy triggered a debate on whether or not all the 42,000 examinees should retake the licensure test to maintain its integrity and standard.

The Professional Regulation Commission (PRC) eventually reversed its earlier pronouncements that there was no cheating when it announced that two BoN members leaked questions. According to one of the two members who were removed for "negligence," she just inadvertently left copies in a Photocopy shop near the PRC-Manila office where she was photocopying her 500 questions. Others charged that the BoN members were bribed by the review centers to provide them with copies of their questions and answers. U.S. based media coverage of this scandal was sparse and little follow-up occurred. The test scandal was covered in depth in at least one nursing magazine, the article "A Breach of Integrity" by Geneviève M. Clavreul, RN. Ph.D. was published in November 2006.

In order to become eligible for a VisaScreen Certificate, Commission on Graduates of Foreign Nursing Schools (CGFNS) has required that a June 2006 passer must first re-take and pass, with a score of 75 percent or better, the "special voluntary examination" covering the subject matter of Tests 3 and 5. Passage of the NCLEX or the CGFNS Examination by any passer of the compromised June 2006 PRC examination will not substitute for the requirement that he or she take the "special voluntary examination" authorized by Executive Order 609 issued by the Philippine Government on March 12, 2007.

Some 42,000 students sat the nursing examination last year but only about 17,000 passed. President Gloria Macapagal Arroyo has since ordered all 17,000 to re-take the exams, sparking an uproar from nurses who denied any involvement in wrongdoing.

A special review conducted by the Department of Labor and Employment in coordination with Centers of Excellence Nursing Schools provided for voluntary special review classes in preparation to the voluntary retake of the equivalent of Tests III and V of the June 2006 Board of Nursing Examination pursuant to Executive Order No. 609, series of 2007 from March 21 to April 4, 2007. The Special Review refers to the series of classes covering the topics included in Tests III and V of the June 2006 of Nursing Licensure Examination (NLE). This is offered exclusively on a voluntary basis to all nurses licensed under the June 2006 NLE. The voluntary examination will not affect the validity of licenses issued. It is offered merely to enhance employability of successful examinees to qualify for the CGFNS VisaScreen Certificate.
