= 2019 in the Philippines =

- Decades: 1990s; 2000s; 2010s; 2020s
- See also: List of years in the Philippines; films; music; television; sports

2019 in the Philippines details events of note that have occurred in the Philippines in 2019.

== Incumbents ==
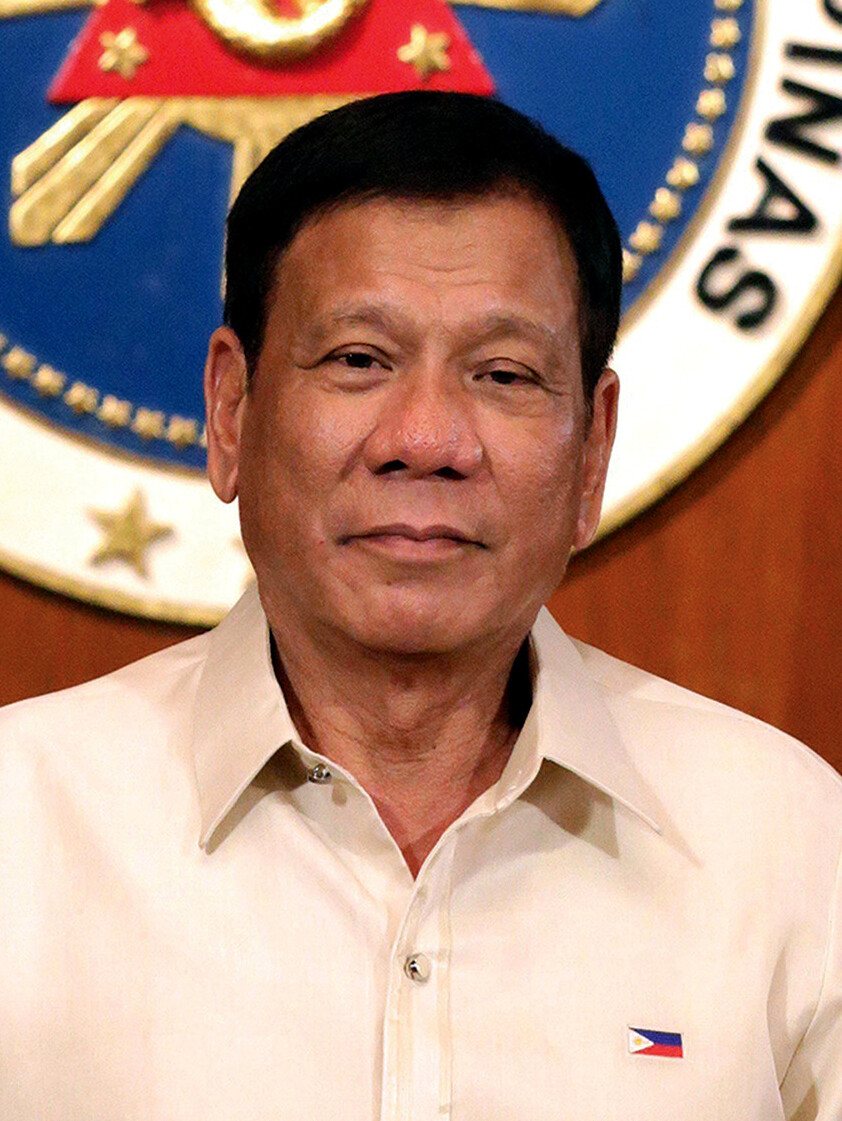
Rodrigo R.
Duterte

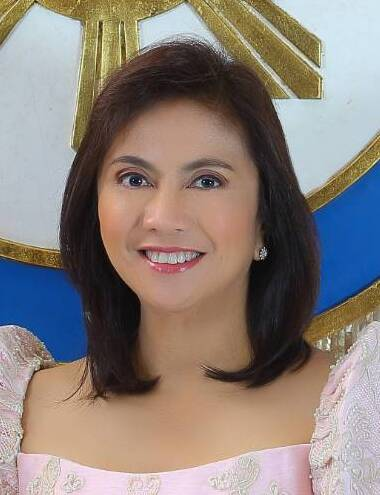
Leni G.
Robredo

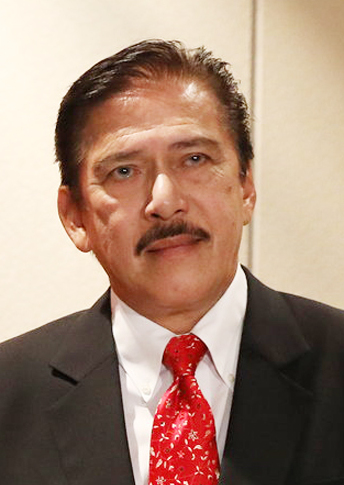
Vicente C.
Sotto III

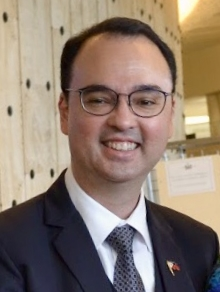
Alan Peter S.
Cayetano

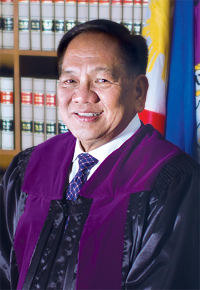
Diosdado M.
Peralta

- President: Rodrigo Duterte (PDP–Laban)
- Vice President: Leni Robredo (Liberal)
- Congress (17th, ended June 4):
  - Senate President: Tito Sotto (NPC)
  - House Speaker: Gloria Macapagal Arroyo (PDP–Laban) (until June 30)
- Congress (18th, convened July 22):
  - Senate President: Vicente Sotto III (NPC)
  - House Speaker: Alan Peter Cayetano (Nacionalista) (elected July 22)
- Chief Justice:
  - Lucas Bersamin (until October 18)
  - Antonio Carpio (acting) (October 18–23)
  - Diosdado Peralta (from October 23)

== Events ==
=== January ===
Map of the results of the 2019 Bangsamoro Autonomous Region plebiscite

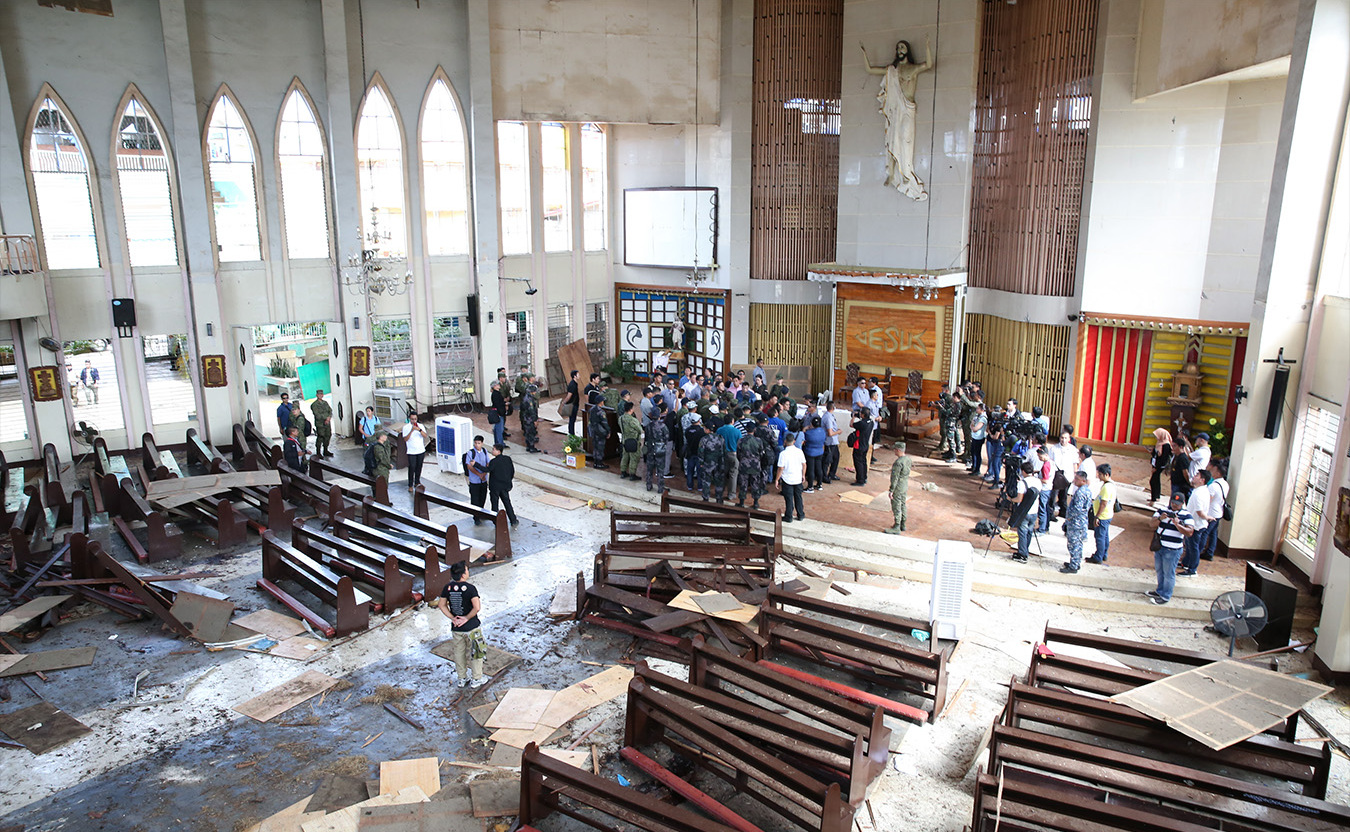
Aftermath of the bombing inside the Cathedral Our Lady of Mount Carmel

- January 8 – Hanjin Heavy Industries and Construction Philippines (HHIC Phil) files for corporate rehabilitation after declaring bankruptcy. It is the biggest bankruptcy in the Philippines surpassing the more than $386 million financial losses in the country related to the Lehman Brothers bankruptcy of 2008. HHIC defaulted its $412 million loan credited to five local banking firms.
- January 10:
  - President Duterte signs Republic Act. No. 11188, providing special protection of children in armed conflict.
  - Maia Santos Deguito, the former bank manager of Rizal Commercial Banking Corporation (RCBC) is convicted of money laundering in connection with the $81-million cyber heist on Bangladesh's central bank in 2016.
- January 21 – A plebiscite takes place with the majority of voters ratifying the Bangsamoro Organic Law creating the Bangsamoro Autonomous Region in Muslim Mindanao and abolishing the Autonomous Region in Muslim Mindanao. Cotabato City also votes to join the new autonomous region while in Isabela City in Basilan rejects its inclusion to the region.
- January 24 – The International Union for Conservation of Nature (IUCN) places tawilis on the list of endangered species.
- January 27:
  - At least 20 people are killed while 111 people are injured after explosions rock the Cathedral of Our Lady of Mount Carmel in Jolo, Sulu.
- January 28 – Lawmakers propose to lower the age of criminal responsibility, sparking outrage.

=== February ===
- February 6 – The second round of the Bangamoro Organic Law plebiscite is held with voters in 67 barangays in Cotabato and six towns in Lanao del Norte deciding if they are in favor of their localities joining the proposed Bangsamoro Autonomous Region in Muslim Mindanao. The 63 barangays in Cotabato vote to join the new region while the six municipalities in Lanao del Norte, despite approving the motion, fail to join after the rest of the province rejects their inclusion to the region.
- February 13 – Rappler CEO Maria Ressa is arrested by the National Bureau of Investigation (NBI) for cyber libel upon orders from Manila Regional Trial Court Branch 46. She posts bail the next day. Ressa claims that her right to due process was violated, since she was not informed of the complaint against her. She also describes her arrest as an "abuse of power" and "weaponization of the law". Ressa's arrest is condemned by journalists, organizations, and influential figures from the Philippines and abroad, describing it as an attack on press freedom. Presidential Spokesperson Salvador Panelo denies that the government was trying to silence press freedom. President Duterte has repeatedly labeled Rappler as "fake news" as he perceives the online news site to be too critical of his administration. However, the libel complaint had been filed by businessman Wilfredo Keng regarding a Rappler article published in May 2012 (updated in February 2014) where Keng was alleged to have lent a vehicle to Chief Justice Renato Corona, who was undergoing an impeachment trial at the time. The article also links Keng to human trafficking and drug smuggling.
- February 14 – President Duterte signs Republic Act No. 11201, creating the Department of Human Settlements and Urban Development.
- February 22 – President Duterte signs the Tulong-Trabaho Act (Republic Act 11230), mandating free access to technical-vocational education.
- February 26 – The Bangsamoro Autonomous Region in Muslim Mindanao formally established and the Bangsamoro Transition Authority (BTA) is constituted.

=== March ===
- Since March 6 – Numerous areas across Metro Manila, estimated to be 52,000 households by Manila Water, experience water scarcity. Manila Water COO Geodino Carpio cites the delay of water infrastructure projects, such as the constructions of a wastewater treatment plant in Cardona, Rizal and the Kaliwa Dam in Tanay, Rizal, for the issue. Manila Water also noted the critically low levels of the La Mesa Dam, its lowest level in 12 years, which the company relies on as their emergency supply of water source.
- March 10 – Murder of Christine Silawan in Lapu-Lapu City, Cebu.
- March 15 – Former Ombudsman Conchita Carpio-Morales and former Secretary of Foreign Affairs Albert del Rosario file a case in the International Criminal Court (ICC) against Chinese President Xi Jinping and other Chinese government officials for alleged crimes against humanity. The complaint cited environmental damage in the South China Sea due to land reclamation, occupation of islands, and destructive fishing activities conducted by China. The communication was delivered to the ICC two days before the Philippines' ICC withdrawal became effective.
- March 17 – The Philippines formally withdraws from the International Criminal Court after the country's withdrawal notification was received by the Secretary-General of the United Nations in 2017. The court earlier launched a preliminary investigation whether it has jurisdiction to tackle on allegations of state-sanctioned human rights violations in the Philippine drug war.
- March 21 – President Duterte officially declares the permanent termination of peace negotiations with the CPP-NPA-NDF.
- March 29 – Rappler CEO and journalist Maria Ressa is arrested for allegedly violating the Anti-Dummy Law, which prohibits foreigners from intervening in the management and operation of a Filipino media company. She was released the same day after posting bail. The charge is based on Rappler's issuance of Philippine Depositary receipts (PDRs) to the American company Omidyar Network in 2015. Ressa describes her arrest as an attack on press freedom, accusing the Philippine government of being "intolerant of journalists", which Presidential Spokesperson Salvador Panelo denies.
- March 30 – Fourteen people are killed during police operations across Negros Oriental. Human rights and farmer groups condemn the incident, saying that the victims are merely farmers and trishaw drivers.

=== April ===
- April 3 – A series of videos is uploaded by an account named "Ang Totoong Narcolist" on YouTube, accusing the Duterte family, as well as former Special Assistant to the President (SAP) Bong Go, of involving in the illegal drug trade. Rodel Jayme is arrested on April 30 by the NBI for sharing the videos.
- April 5 – Republic Act 11259 is signed into law, approving the proposed division of the province of Palawan into three provinces: Palawan del Norte, Palawan Oriental and Palawan del Sur to be approved in a plebiscite.
- April 10 – Fossil fragments found in Callao Cave in Cagayan reveal the existence of the "Homo luzonensis" species of humans. The species is named after the island where it was discovered, Luzon.
- April 12 – President Duterte signs the Magna Carta of the Poor (Republic Act 11291), which aims to uplift the standard of living of poor Filipinos.
- April 17:
  - President Duterte signs into law the Safe Spaces Act (Republic Act 11313), punishing gender-based sexual harassment such as wolf-whistling and catcalling in public spaces.
  - President Duterte signs the Pantawid Pamilyang Pilipino Program (4Ps) Act, institutionalizing the 4Ps cash transfer program and seeking to reduce poverty by providing "conditional cash transfer to poor households for a maximum period of seven years.
- April 22:
  - A 6.1-magnitude earthquake hits large parts of Luzon, killing at least 16 people and injuring 81 others.
  - The "Oust-Duterte" matrix, containing supposed destabilization efforts by media organizations and journalists against Duterte, is revealed to the public.
- April 23 – A 6.5-magnitude earthquake hits Eastern Visayas with its epicenter at San Julian, Eastern Samar less than 24 hours after the Luzon earthquake.

=== May ===
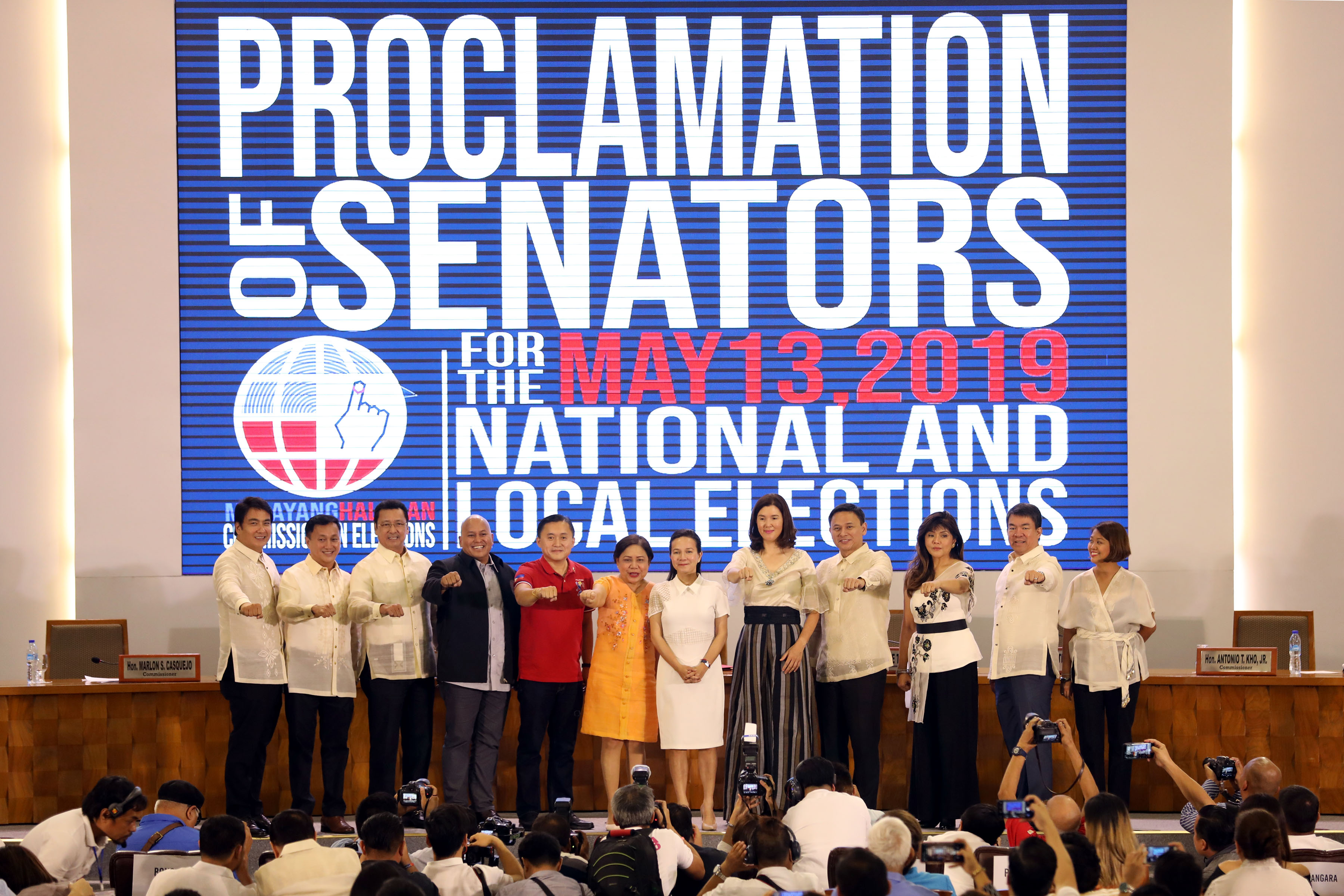
The proclamation of the winning twelve senators by the Commission on Elections on May 22, 2019

- May 6 – Peter Joemel Advincula, the man claimed to be "Bikoy" in the "Ang Totoong Narcolist" videos, reveals himself to the public and asks for legal assistance. Advincula denies links to any political movement. On May 23, Advincula surrenders to the Camp Crame, where he retracts his initial statement and claims that the videos were "orchestrated" by the Liberal Party and Senator Antonio Trillanes IV. He also claims that he was promised to receive ₱500,000 for his participation.
- May 13 – The Philippine general elections are held. Voters elect new members of the House of Representatives as well as 12 members of the Senate.
- May 21 – Former Ombudsman Conchita Carpio-Morales is denied entry to Hong Kong due to her "security threat". Though Hong Kong does not explain why, Malacañang states that it is in retaliation by China against Carpio-Morales for filing a criminal case in the ICC against Chinese President Xi Jinping and other officials over China's land reclamation in the disputed South China Sea.
- May 22 – Commission on Elections (COMELEC), sitting as the National Board of Canvassers (NBOC), proclaims 12 winning senators in the midterm elections. It also proclaims 51 winning party-list members as well.

=== June ===
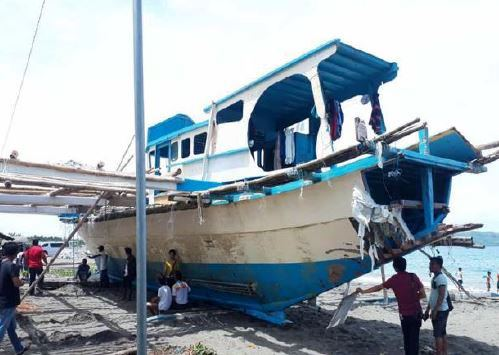
F/B Gem-Ver's truncated stern is evident in this image taken after the incident

- June 8 – Religious corporation Kapa-Community Ministry International is shut down by authorities under President Duterte's orders over the allegations of its running of a Ponzi scheme.
- June 9 – The fishing boat F/B Gem-Ver sinks at Reed Bank after being rammed by a Chinese vessel.
- June 10 – Dr. Brian Sy, owner of the WellMed Dialysis Center in Quezon City who is accused of making "ghost" claims with the Philippine Health Insurance Corporation (PhilHealth) is arrested by the National Bureau of Investigation (NBI) for the charges of estafa, falsification of public documents, and violation of the PhilHealth law.
- June 17 – The Manila Metropolitan Trial Court Branch 14 convicts John Paul Solano, a member of the Aegis Juris Fraternity, of obstruction of justice in connection with the Atio Castillo hazing case.
- June 21 – Former Foreign Affairs Secretary Albert del Rosario is denied entry to Hong Kong despite carrying a valid diplomatic passport.
- June 27 – Several opposition groups began filing impeachment complaints against Rodrigo Duterte due to the Reed Bank incident and his subsequent policy of "allowing China to fish in the Exclusive Economic Zone (EEZ) in the West Philippine Sea".
- June 29 – Tons of Canadian garbage left in the Philippines in 2013 and 2014 arrive in a port outside Vancouver, ending a diplomatic row highlighting garbage dumping by other countries on Asian nations.

=== July ===
- July 8 – President Duterte awards a certificate of public convenience and necessity (CPCN) and permit to operate to DITO Telecommunity, a consortium of Davao City-based businessman Dennis Uy.
- July 11 – A resolution initiated by Iceland is adopted by the United Nations Human Rights Council calling for an investigation on the human rights situation in the Philippines including deaths linked to President Duterte's campaign against drugs.
- July 13 – Father Gerard Francisco Timoner III from Daet, Camarines Norte is elected the Master of the Order of Preachers, the head of the Dominican Order, for a nine-year term. Timoner is the first Filipino, as well as the first Asian, to be elected as such.
- Since July 18 – A series of killings occur in Negros Oriental after four police officers are killed by suspected communist groups.
- July 18 – The Philippine National Police (PNP) files a sedition complaint against Vice President Leni Robredo, several senators and opposition personalities in connection with the Bikoy videos.
- July 26 – President Duterte orders a halt in all gaming operations with franchises, licenses or permits granted by the Philippine Charity Sweepstakes Office (PCSO), citing corruption. On July 27, the PNP begins shutting down lotto kiosks and other gaming outlets nationwide. On July 30, President Rodrigo Duterte lifts the suspension of operations of lotto game. On August 22, Duterte lifts the suspension on the operations of Small Town Lottery (STL) in the country. On September 28, Duterte lifts the suspension on the operations of Keno Game and Instant Sweepstakes Scratch-It schemes.
- July 27 – A magnitude 5.9 earthquake strikes Batanes. It is preceded by a 5.4 magnitude foreshock. Nine people are killed by the two earthquakes. A state of calamity was declared in the whole province.

=== August ===
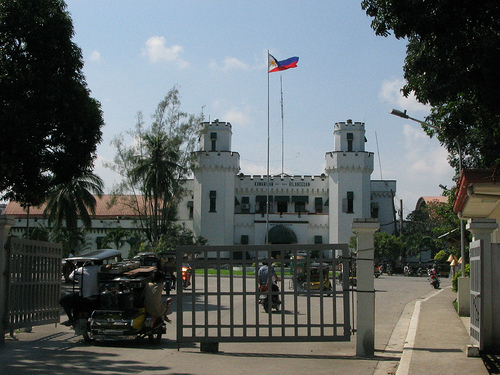
New Bilibid Prison where both Antonio Sanchez and the suspects of Chiong sisters murders are incarcerated

- August 2 – PresidentDuterte signs Proclamation No. 781 conferring the National Scientist title to plant geneticist, agronomist and former University of the Philippines president Emil Javier.
- August 3 – At least 31 are killed after strong winds capsize three boats in the Guimaras Strait.
- August 5:
  - COMELEC cancels the nomination of former National Youth Commission Chairperson Ronald Cardema as representative of the Duterte Youth party-list due to misrepresentation. On September 13, Cardema formally withdraws his bid as the party-list's first nominee.
  - The Sandiganbayan dismisses a ₱102 billion civil case filed by the Presidential Commission on Good Government (PCGG) in 1987 against the family of former President Ferdinand Marcos and their cronies, on the involvement of former Ambassador Roberto Benedicto in the allegations of using dummies and government corporations to obtain assets.
- August 8 – President Duterte signs the Philippine Space Act (Republic Act No. 11363) creating the Philippine Space Agency (PhilSA).
- August 20 – News reports state that former Calauan, Laguna Mayor Antonio Sanchez, the mastermind in the rape and murder of Eileen Sarmenta and Allan Gomez in 1993, "could have walked free in the next two months" after spending 25 years in prison, citing "good conduct" according to the document bearing the signature of Bureau of Corrections (BuCor) Director-General Nicanor Faeldon. The impending release of Sanchez sparked nationwide outrage and condemnation. However, on August 22, Justice Secretary Menardo Guevarra and Faeldon announce that Sanchez is not eligible under a 2013 law (RA No. 10592), that credits good conduct time allowance (GCTA) for an early release from prison. On August 26, President Duterte orders Guevarra and Faeldon not to release Sanchez due to his bad behavior. On September 2, the Senate Blue Ribbon Committee begins its investigation on the supposed early release of Sanchez and the Good Conduct Time Allowance (GCTA) law. On same day, Faeldon confirms that George Medialdea, Rogelio Corcolon and Zoilo Ama, who were also convicted for the murders had died in jail.
- August 22 – Former foreign affairs secretary Perfecto Yasay Jr. is arrested by Manila Police District (MPD) officers in relation to criminal charges allegedly committed by officials of Banco Filipino.

=== September ===
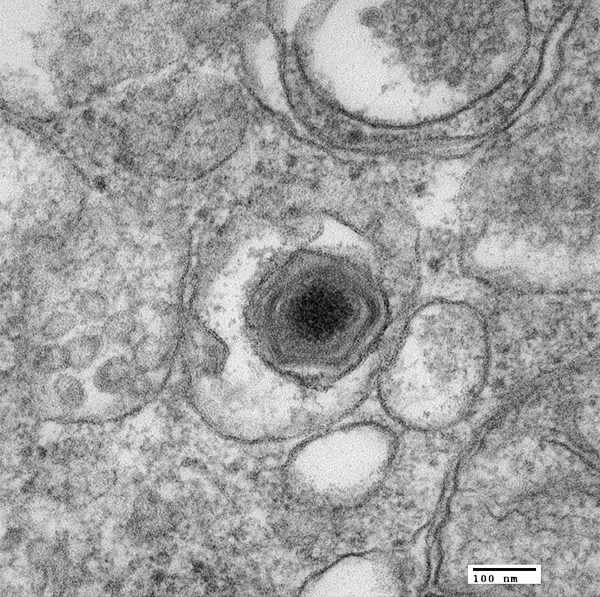
African swine fever virus

- September 1 – An 11-seater Beechcraft King Air 350 aircraft on a medevac mission from Dipolog Airport, Zamboanga del Norte to Ninoy Aquino International Airport, Manila crashes in Pansol, Calamba, Laguna, killing all nine people on board and injuring two on the ground.
- September 2 – Bureau of Corrections Director General Nicanor Faeldon confirms the release of four persons convicted for the July 1997 murder of the Chiong sisters in Cebu. On September 6, two of the convicts, Ariel Balansag and Alberto Caño, surrender to authorities. followed on September 18 by the remaining two convicts, James Anthony Uy and Josman Aznar.
- September 3 – The Supreme Court dismisses the petition of attorney Jess Falcis for the removal of a legal barrier to same-sex marriages in the Philippines, but recognizes that the Constitution does not restrict marriage on the basis of sex.
- September 4 – President Duterte fires Bureau of Corrections chief Faeldon over the release of several heinous crime convicts in the Sarmienta-Gomez and Chiong murder cases. On September 5, Yolanda Camelon, wife of an inmate in the New Bilibid Prison, testifies in the third Senate hearing on the Good Conduct Time Allowance (GCTA) law and claims that Bureau of Corrections (BuCor) employees asked ₱50,000 from her in a botched deal to buy her husband's early release from prison. On September 9, Ombudsman Samuel Martires orders the suspension for six months without pay of 30 officials of the Bureau of Corrections in connection with the release of over 1,900 convicts of heinous crimes under the Good Conduct Time Allowance law.
- September 7 – Santo Tomas becomes a component city in the province of Batangas through ratification of Republic Act 11086.
- September 9 – The first case of African swine fever is confirmed by the Department of Agriculture. It is also confirmed that an undisclosed number of pigs were culled in Rizal to contain a "suspected animal disease".
- September 18 – The Manila Metropolitan Trial Court Branch 15 convicts eight Philippine Coast Guard personnel of homicide for the killing of a Taiwanese fisherman off Batanes in May 2013, which sparked a diplomatic row between Taipei and Manila.
- September 20 – The Philippine Military Academy (PMA) confirms that Cadet 4th Class Darwin Dormitorio died of injuries resulting from hazing rites, supposedly at the hands of three upperclassmen inside the school on September 18.
- September 24:
  - Voting 17–0, the Senate authorizes the Blue Ribbon and justice committees to release the names of the rogue cops involved in the so-called "Agaw-bato" scheme, in which cops allegedly sell illegal drugs seized in narcotics operations.
  - Lieutenant General Ronnie Evangelista and Brigadier General Bartolome Bacarro resign from their posts in the PMA following the hazing death ofDarwin Dormitorio. On October 9, Cadet 1st Class Ram Michael Navarro also resigns from his post in the PMA.
- September 25 – The Sandiganbayan dismisses another civil case filed by the Presidential Commission on Good Government against former president Ferdinand Marcos, Imelda Marcos, and five alleged cronies including former ambassador Bienvenido Tantoco Sr., regarding the ₱1.05 billion ill-gotten wealth, due to insufficient evidence; the decision is publicized the following month. In July 2023, the Supreme Court publishes a decision, promulgated in March, affirming the decision.
- September 27 – The US Senate Appropriations Committee approves an amendment to deny entry to any Philippine official involved in the two-year detention of Senator Leila de Lima.

=== October ===
- October 1 – PNP chief Gen. Oscar Albayalde appears before the Senate's inquiry on "ninja cops", the police officers involved in the illegal drug trade. Albayalde denies allegations of protecting his former subordinates who are accused of misappropriating a large quantity of illegal drugs seized in a raid in 2013. Albayalde resigns on October 14 because of the controversy. On October 21, the PNP–Criminal Investigation and Detection Group (CIDG) adds Albayalde as a respondent in criminal charges being reinvestigated by the DOJ.
- October 2 – A fire at the Star City amusement park in Pasay, Metro Manila, occurs at midnight.
- October 4 – BuCor chief Gerald Bantag orders the dismissal of some 300 guards at the maximum security compound of the New Bilibid Prison in Muntinlupa.
- October 6 – Usage of the landline numbers with an additional digit from 7 digits is officially implemented, upon the order of the National Telecommunications Commission (NTC).
- October 8 – The Supreme Court upholds the validity of a legal provision setting the minimum base pay for nurses in government health institutions to Salary Grade 15, but says that implementing the clause requires a law providing funds for it.
- October 11 – The Supreme Court allows Filipina death row inmate Mary Jane Veloso to testify against her alleged recruiters through deposition in Indonesia.
- October 14 – The Sandiganbayan dismisses another civil case filed by the Presidential Commission on Good Government against the family of former President Ferdinand Marcos and their cronies, on the involvement of Fe and Ignacio Gimenez and others on the family's hidden wealth; the decision is made public on October 25.
- October 15 – The Supreme Court, sitting as the Presidential Electoral Tribunal, orders the release of the official report on the initial vote recount involved in the election protest of Bongbong Marcos against Vice President Leni Robredo.
- October 16 – The 2019 Cotabato earthquakes begin with a 6.3 magnitude earthquake that kills five people and injures 53 others. Another earthquake on October 29 with a magnitude of 6.6 kills at least nine people and injures 200. A third one on October 31, a magnitude 6.5, not considered to be an aftershock of the second event, kills six people and injures 20 others. The epicenters of these earthquakes are located near Tulunan, Cotabato.
- October 18 – The Senate Blue Ribbon Committee, chaired by Richard J. Gordon, recommends the filing of criminal charges against former PNP chief Gen. Oscar Albayalde and 13 police officers who were involved in an irregular drug operation in Pampanga in 2013.
- October 31 – Cebu City is selected to be part of the UNESCO Creative Cities Network.

=== November ===
- November 5 – President Duterte designates Vice President Robredo as co-chairperson of the Inter-Agency Committee on Anti-Illegal Drugs (ICAD).
- November 6 – The DOJ grants refugee status to Iranian beauty queen Bahareh Zare Bahari, who had sought asylum in the Philippines for fear of death or detention in her home country.
- November 8:
  - The Supreme Court extends the deadline for the ruling on the cases against Andal Ampatuan Jr. and nearly 200 others tagged in the Maguindanao massacre in 2009.
  - President Duterte abolishes the Pasig River Rehabilitation Commission (PRRC) and transfers the river's rehabilitation to the Department of Environment and Natural Resources (DENR).
- November 11 – Six soldiers are killed while 20 others are injuredin a firefight against the New People's Army in Sitio Bangon, Brgy. Pinanag-an, Borongan, Eastern Samar.
- November 15 – The Sandiganbayan finds former Isabela governor Grace Padaca guilty of malversation of public funds and graft in connection with the granting of P25 million to a private entity for the province's rice program.

=== December ===
- December 2 – Typhoon Kammuri (Tisoy) hits Southern Luzon, Bicol Region and the Visayas, leaving massive damage to agriculture estimated at ₱3.67-billion, and killing 17 people.
- December 7 – A majority of residents in Compostela Valley approve changing the name of their province to Davao de Oro in a plebiscite.
- December 8 – Pope Francis names Manila Archbishop Cardinal Luis Antonio Tagle as the new prefect of the Congregation for the Evangelization of Peoples, which is regarded as the second most important position in the Vatican.
- December 13 – Four are killed: a policeman and three citizens in an ambush allegedly orchestrated by the New People's Army in Borongan, Eastern Samar.
- December 15 – A magnitude 6.9 earthquake hits Matanao, Davao del Sur killing seven people and injuring 100 others. It is the 5th earthquake to hit Mindanao in the span of 3 months.
- December 16 – The Sandiganbayan, for the fourth time, dismisses a forfeiture case filed by the government against the Marcos family in relation to ₱200 billion (US$3.9 billion) of alleged ill-gotten wealth, citing lack of evidence. The decision is affirmed in July 2022, with clarifications that the family recovered only four properties, and most of the wealth had been recovered.
- December 19 – Quezon City Regional Trial Court (RTC) Branch 221 Judge Jocelyn Solis-Reyes serves her judgment on the Maguindanao massacre case at a special court session held at Camp Bagong Diwa in Taguig. In the verdict, the Ampatuan brothers, Andal Jr. and Zaldy, and 28 co-accused are convicted of 57 counts of murder and sentenced to reclusion perpetua (40 years) without parole; 15 are sentenced to 6–10 years for being accessories to the crime; while 55 others are acquitted, including one of the main suspects, incumbent mayor of Shariff Saydona Mustapha, Maguindanao Datu Sajid Islam Ampatuan.
- December 24 – Typhoon Phanfone (Ursula) hits Southern Luzon and the Visayas, including areas hit earlier by Typhoon Kammuri, leaving damages worth at least a billion peso, and killing 50 people.
- December 31 – After 43 years, the Harrison Plaza, regarded as the first modern shopping mall in Manila, ceases operations.

== Holidays ==
On August 16, 2018, the government announced at least 18 Philippine holidays for 2019 as declared by virtue of Proclamation No. 555, series of 2018.

=== Regular ===
- January 1 – New Year's Day
- April 9 – Araw ng Kagitingan (Day of Valor)
- April 18 – Maundy Thursday
- April 19 – Good Friday
- May 1 – Labor Day
- June 5 – Eid'l Fitr (Feast of Ramadan)
- June 12 – Independence Day
- August 12 – Eid'l Adha (Feast of Sacrifice)
- August 26 – National Heroes Day
- November 30 – Bonifacio Day
- December 25 – Christmas Day
- December 30 – Rizal Day

=== Special (Non-working) ===
- February 5 – Chinese New Year
- February 25 – 1986 EDSA Revolution
- April 20 – Black Saturday
- May 13 – Election Day
- August 21 – Ninoy Aquino Day
- November 1 – All Saints Day
- November 2 – Special non-working holiday
- December 8 – Feast of the Immaculate Conception
- December 24 – Special non-working holiday
- December 31 – Last day of the year (in observance of New Year's celebrations)

== Business and economy ==
- January 19 – Financial services firm Cebuana Lhuillier announces that the personal information of around 900,000 people are affected in a data breach involving their email server which is used for marketing purposes.

== Health ==
- February 6 – A major measles outbreak, exacerbated by the effects of the Dengvaxia controversy on vaccination, is declared in Metro Manila and Central Luzon.
- February 20 – President Duterte signs the Universal Health Care Act (Republic Act No. 11223), a measure seeking to provide health care coverage for all Filipinos.
- July 15 – Health Secretary Francisco Duque III declares a "National Dengue Alert" as cases of dengue continue to rise in the country.
- August 6 – The Department of Health (DOH) declares a national dengue epidemic following the increasing number of dengue cases in the country.
- September 19 – The DOH confirms the re-emergence of polio in the Philippines, 19 years after the World Health Organization declared the country polio-free.
- September 26 – DOH confirms that the death of a 10-year-old student in Pandacan is due to diphtheria, a highly communicable bacterial infection.
- November 15 – The DOH confirms the first reported case of an illness related to vaping or the use of e-cigarettes, one involving a teenage girl.
- December 3 – President Duterte signs Republic Act 11463, institutionalizing Malasakit Centers in all DOH-run hospitals nationwide.
- December 22–26 – At least 23 people die after drinking methanol-laced lambanog in Laguna and Quezon.

== Sports ==
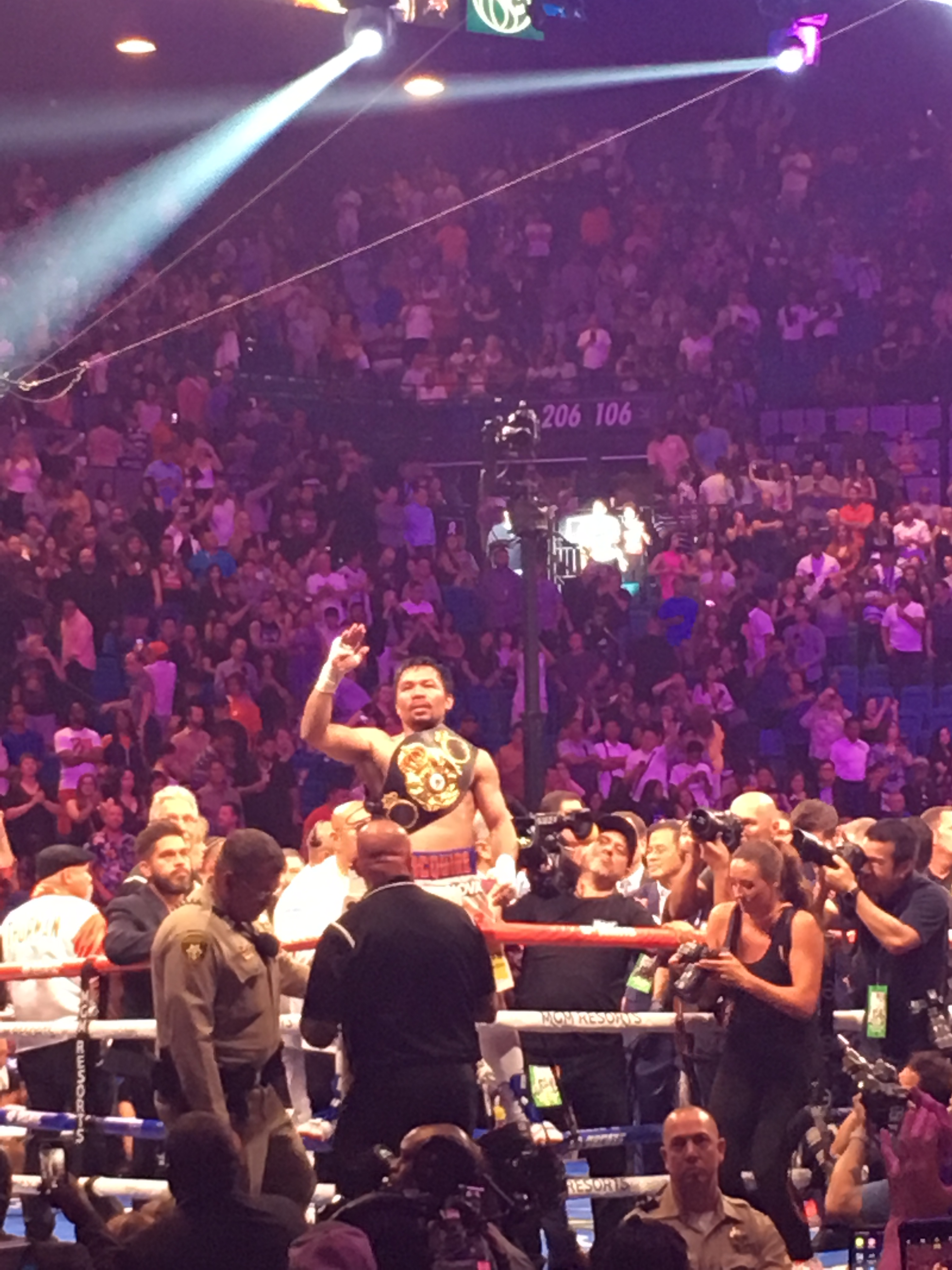
Pacquiao greets the crowd after his victory over Thurman.

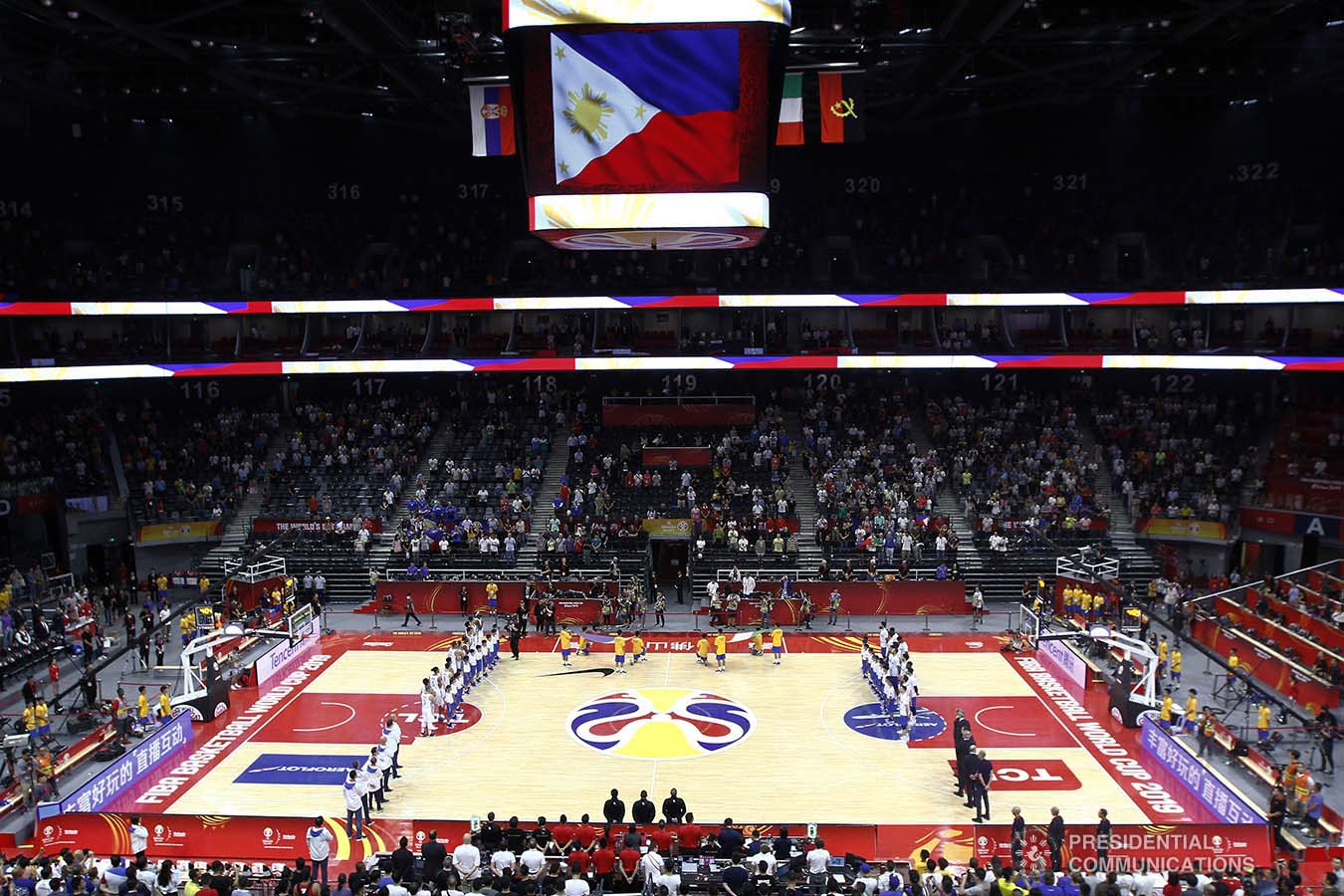
Foshan International Sports and Cultural Center, the venue between Gilas Pilipinas and Italy of the 2019 FIBA Basketball World Cup Group D

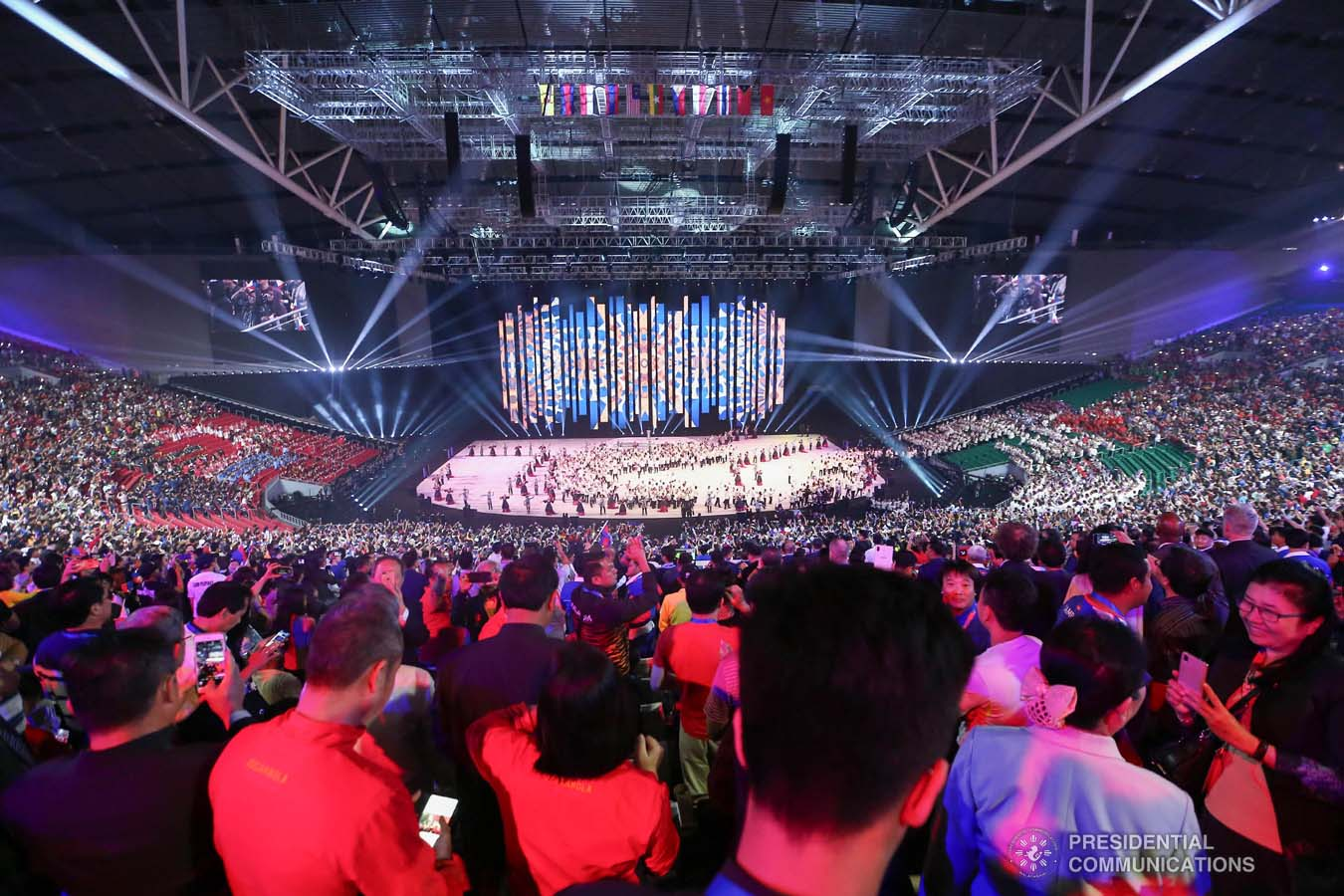
The opening ceremony of the 2019 Southeast Asian Games

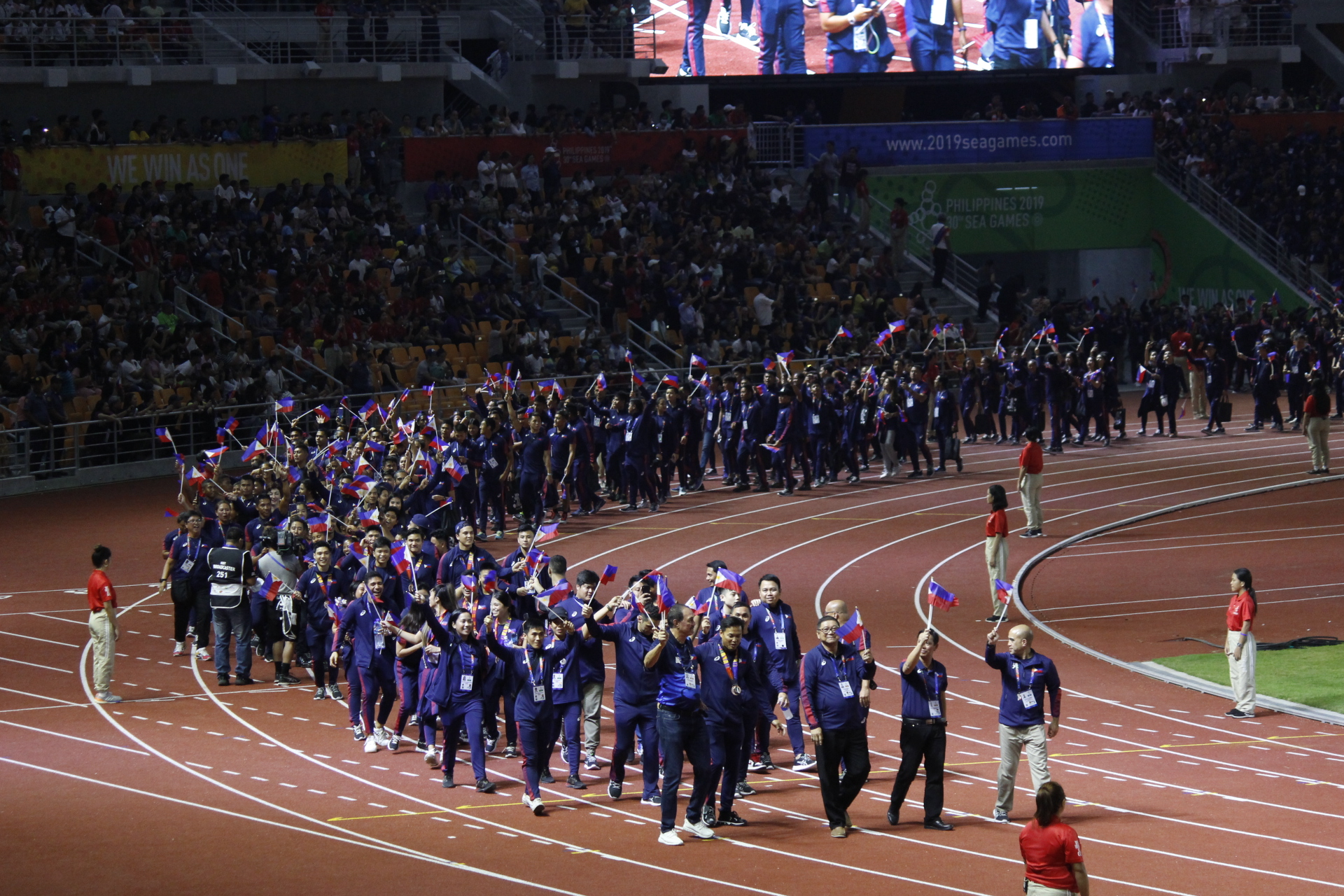
The Philippine delegation team at the SEA Games closing ceremony

- January 7–16, Football – The Philippines makes its first-ever appearance in the AFC Asian Cup. The national team fails to advance past beyond the group stage in the edition of the tournament hosted in the United Arab Emirates.
- January 19, Boxing – Manny Pacquiao wins via unanimous decision against American boxer Adrien Broner to retain the WBA welterweight title at the MGM Grand Garden Arena in Las Vegas, Nevada.
- April 13, Diving – El Nido, Palawan hosts the 11th season of the 2019 Red Bull Cliff Diving World Series, the first time the country as hosts.
- April 27–May 5, Multi-sport events – Davao City hosts the 2019 Palarong Pambansa.
- April 27 Boxing – Nonito Donaire is crowned the new WBA "Super" bantamweight champion after defeating American boxer Stephon Young for the WBA World Boxing Super Series Semi-finals in Cajundome, Lafayette, Louisiana.
- May 15:
  - Men's Volleyball – The NU Bulldogs become the UAAP season 81 Men's Volleyball champions after defeating the FEU Tamaraws in four hard-fought sets on Game 2 of the best of 3 series. Bryan Bagunas was named as the Finals MVP.
  - Basketball – The San Miguel Beermen pull off a rare seven-game sweep after outclassing Magnolia Hotshots, 72–71, in the 2019 PBA Philippine Cup Finals at Smart Araneta Coliseum in Quezon City.
- May 18, Women's Volleyball – The Ateneo Lady Eagles win their third championship after defeating the UST Golden Tigresses in the UAAP Women's Volleyball Season 81 Finals at the Mall of Asia Arena in Pasay. Bea de Leon was awarded as finals MVP.
- July 7–12, Floorball – The 2019 Men's Asia-Oceania Floorball Cup is held in Biñan, Laguna. The Philippines, the hosts, finish third.
- July 20, Boxing: – Manny Pacquiao wins via split decision against American boxer Keith Thurman to defend his WBA Super welterweight championship title at the MGM Grand Garden Arena in Las Vegas.
- July 21, Basketball – The Philippines' Mighty Sports defeats the Republic of China White, 81–71, to win the 2019 William Jones Cup.
- August 16, Basketball – The San Miguel Beermen reclaim the PBA Commissioner's Cup throne with a 102–90 victory over TNT in Game 6 of the finals at the Araneta Coliseum.
- August 31 – September 15, Basketball – Gilas Pilipinas grabs its fifth loss in the 2019 FIBA Basketball World Cup. The Philippines leaves with a 0–5 record, the country's worst performance since the 1978 edition.
- September 3, Athletics – Pole vaulter Ernest John "EJ" Obiena becomes the first Filipino to qualify for the 2020 Tokyo Olympics after surpassing the 5.80-meter qualifying standard in an athletics meet in Chiara, Italy.
- September 20, Wrestling – The World Wrestling Entertainment (WWE) returns to the Philippines for a one-night event at the Smart Araneta Coliseum.
- October 8, Gymnastics – Filipino gymnast Carlos Yulo qualifies to the 2020 Tokyo Olympics after placing 18th in the individual all-around qualification of the 49th FIG Artistic Gymnastics World Championships for the men's division in Stuttgart, Germany.
- October 12, Gymnastics – Carlos Yulo wins the men's floor title at the 2019 World Artistic Gymnastics Championships in Stuttgart.
- October 13:
  - Boxing – Nesthy Petecio wins the gold medal in the featherweight division of the 2019 AIBA Women's World Boxing Championships in Ulan-Ude, Russia.
  - Karate – Jamie Berberabe Lim, daughter of PBA legend Avelino "Samboy" Lim, wins a gold medal in the 2019 Amatör Spor Haftasi Karate Championship in Sakarya, Turkey.
- October 24:
  - Fencing – Teen fencer Samantha Kyle Catantan wins the gold medal in the Asian Under 23 Fencing Championships in Bangkok, Thailand.
  - Weightlifting – Vanessa Sarno captures two gold medals and one silver medal, while fellow Chariz Macawli and Rosegie Ramos win a silver and two bronze medals in the 2019 Asian Youth and Junior Weightlifting Championships in Pyongyang, North Korea.
- October 27, Ice Skating – Eleven-year-old skater Katrina Amber Cruz wins four gold medals at the Skate Indonesia Leg of the Ice Skating Institute Asia (ISIAsia) Championship Series 2019 in Jakarta.
- November 6, Collegiate sports – University of Santo Tomas Soulemane Chabi Yo and Grace Irebu are named the Most Valuable Player of the Men's and Women's division in UAAP Season 82.
- November 7, Boxing – Nonito Donaire is defeated by Japanese boxer Naoya Inoue via unanimous decision to grab the IBF and WBA bantamweight titles in the World Boxing Super Series bantamweight final at Saitama Super Arena in Saitama, Japan.
- November 10, Archery – Andrea Robles wins a gold medal at the 2019 Indoor Archery World Series in China.
- November 12, Basketball – Maharlika Pilipinas Basketball League (MPBL) president Manny Pacquiao files a formal complaint with the DOJ against 21 individuals who were accused of game-fixing, betting and point-shaving.
- November 30 – December 11 – Multi-Sport Event – The Philippines hosts the 2019 Southeast Asian Games.

== Entertainment and culture ==
- January 8 – Francesca Taruc is crowned Miss Tourism World Intercontinental 2019 in Nanjing, China.
- January 22 – Rogel Cabisidan from Paete, Laguna wins the jury's prize in the 28th Edition of the International Ice Carving Competition in Valloire, France.
- January 26 – Karen Gallman wins the Miss Intercontinental title in a pageant night held at the Mall of Asia Arena in Pasay. It is the first time the Philippines wins in the pageant.
- February 24 – The coronation event of the Mister International 2019 pageant takes place at the One Esplanade in Pasay. It is the second time that the Philippines hosts the event. Trinh Van Bao of Vietnam was crowned as Mister International 2019.
- March 28 – Miss Universe 2015 Pia Wurtzbach's wax figure is unveiled to the public during a press launch at the EDSA Shangri-La Hotel. She is the first Filipino to get a wax figure from Madame Tussauds.
- March 29 – Maureen Montagne finishes as 1st runner-up at the Miss Eco International 2019 pageant in Egypt.
- April 5 – A statue of Saint Vincent Ferrer in Bayambang, Pangasinan, with 64 feet and 9.56 inches (50.23 meters) in height, is recognized by Guinness World Records as the tallest bamboo sculpture in the world.
- April 7 – Roxanne Baeyens, a 22-year-old Filipino-Belgian beauty representing Baguio, is crowned Face of Tourism Philippines 2019.
- April 17 – Rappler CEO Maria Ressa is named Time magazine's most influential people of 2019, along with some prominent music personalities, government officials and world leaders.
- April 27 – Aly Padillo, an 18-year-old Cebuana, is crowned Center Girl for MNL48 2nd Generation at the ABS-CBN Vertis Tent.
- May 4 – Janjep Carlos is crowned Mr Gay World 2019 in Cape Town, South Africa.
- May 8 – The first coronation event of the Miss Teen Philippines 2019 pageant takes place at the New Frontier Theater in Cubao, Quezon City. Cagayan de Oro student Nikki De Moura wins the pageant.
- June 9 – Gazini Ganados from Talisay, Cebu, is crowned as Miss Universe Philippines 2019, while Patricia Magtanong of Bataan is crowned as Binibining Pilipinas-International 2019 during the coronation night of the Binibining Pilipinas 2019 at the Smart Araneta Coliseum.
- July 10 – Janelle Tee is crowned as Miss Earth Philippines 2019, during the pageant's coronation night at The Cove, Okada Manila, Parañaque.
- July 16 – The MOR Pinoy Music Awards are held at the Smart Araneta Coliseum, coinciding with the sixth anniversary of MOR 101.9 For Life!.
- July 17 – 20-year-old Jane De Leon is chosen to portray the iconic role of the Filipino heroine "Darna".
- July 28:
  - Aicelle Santos finishes 2nd Place at the ASEAN+3 Song Contest in Vietnam. Timmy Pavino also represents the Philippines in the singing competition.
  - Zephanie Dimaranan of Laguna becomes the first Idol Philippines grand champion.
- August 4 – Yamyam Gucong of Bohol becomes the Big Winner of Pinoy Big Brother: Otso.
- August 5 – Jin Macapagal of Cebu City becomes the first BidaMan of It's Showtime.
- August 13 – President Duterte signs Republic Act No. 11370, declaring September 8 a special working holiday to commemorate the birth of the Blessed Virgin Mary.
- August 18 – Klyza Castro of Davao City is crowned as Mutya ng Pilipinas-Asia Pacific International 2019, during the coronation night of the Mutya Pilipinas 2019 at the Mall of Asia Arena.
- August 23 – The coronation event of the Mister World 2019 pageant is held at the Smart Araneta Coliseum, the first time that the Philippines hosts the event. Jack Heslewood of England won the Mr World pageant.
- September 9 – Music icon Ryan Cayabyab and four other Asians officially receive the Ramon Magsaysay Award at the Cultural Center of the Philippines.
- September 15:
  - Kim de Leon and Shayne Sava are hailed as the Ultimate Male and Female Survivors for the 7th season of StarStruck.
  - Michelle Dee of Makati is crowned as Miss World Philippines 2019 during the pageant's coronation night at the Smart Araneta Coliseum.
- September 28 – Elaine Duran of Butuan wins the 3rd season of Tawag ng Tanghalan.
- October 4 – The Miss World Philippines Organization announces that Vanessa Mae Walters had been stripped of the Miss Eco Teen Philippines 2019 title for violating the organization's rules. She was replaced by Mary Daena Zaide Resurrecion.
- October 13 – "Mabagal", a song entry composed by Dan Martel Simon Tañedo and interpreted by Daniel Padilla and Moira Dela Torre is named as the Himig Handog 2019 grand winner.
- October 22 – Leren Mae Bautista wins 2nd runner-up title at the Miss Globe 2019 in Montenegro.
- October 26:
  - Nicole Borromeo from Cebu) is crowned as Miss Millennial Philippines 2019 of the noontime show, Eat Bulaga! held at the Meralco Theater.
  - J-Crisis from Sampaloc, Manila becomes the Classic Showtime 10th Anniversary Grand Champion of the noontime show, It's Showtime held at the Newport Performing Arts Theater, Resorts World Manila.
  - Team Vice with Miss Q and A Queens becomes the Magpasikat 2019 Grand Champion of the It's Showtime held at Newport Performing Arts Theater.
  - Nellys Pimentel of Puerto Rico is crowned as Miss Earth 2019 during the pageant's coronation night at the Cove Manila.
- October 30 – Jose Saguban wins the main award for Top 20 best cacao beans in the world, finishing second in the Asia Pacific region in the prestigious Salon du Chocolat or the International Cocoa Awards.
- October 31 – Sorsogon wins the Guinness World Record for the largest Filipino folk dance with its Pantomina sa Tinampo performance as they celebrate the province's 125th founding year.
- November 3:
  - Vanjoss Bayaban, coached by Sarah Geronimo, wins the fourth season of The Voice Kids during the grand finals at the Newport Performing Arts Theater.
  - Kayesha Clauden Chua is crowned Miss Asia Awards 2019 during the coronation night in Ho Chi Minh City, Vietnam.
- November 6 – Two documentaries programs of GMA Network; namely "Reporter's Notebook: Batas ng Karagatan" and "The Atom Araullo Specials: Babies4sale.Ph", are awarded at the prestigious 2019 Association for International Broadcasting Awards (AIBs) in London.
- November 8 – Cyrille Payumo is crowned as Miss Tourism International 2019 during the pageant's coronation night in Petaling Jaya, Malaysia.
- November 9 – Ethel Booba of General Santos becomes the first-ever Tawag ng Tanghalan Celebrity Grand Champion.
- December 1 – Patricia Javier is crowned as the first ever Noble Queen of the Universe during the pageant's coronation night at the Manila Hotel.
- December 8 – Gazini Ganados places in the Top 20 of the Miss Universe 2019 at Tyler Perry Studios in Atlanta, Georgia.

== Deaths ==
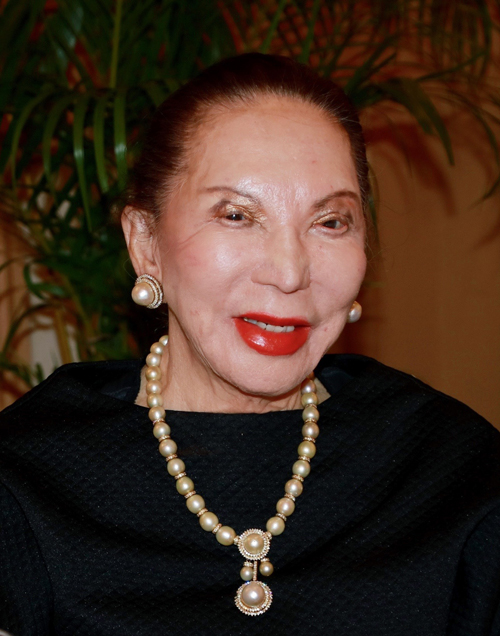
Carmencita Reyes

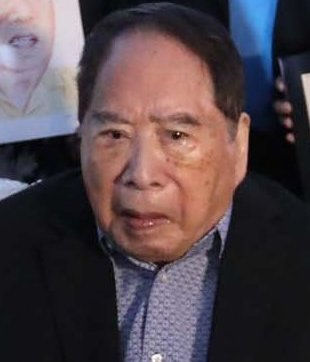
Henry Sy

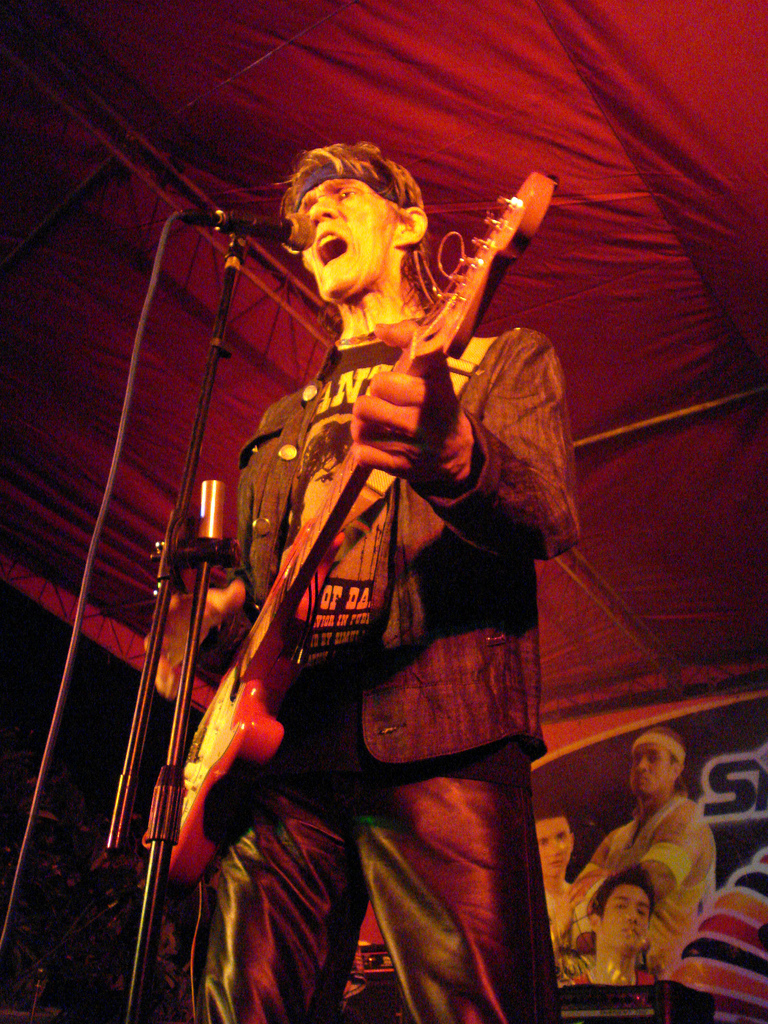
Pepe Smith

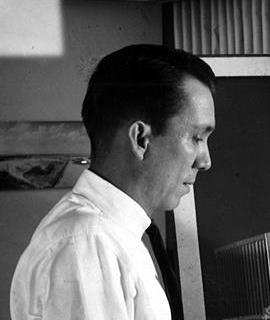
Francisco Mañosa

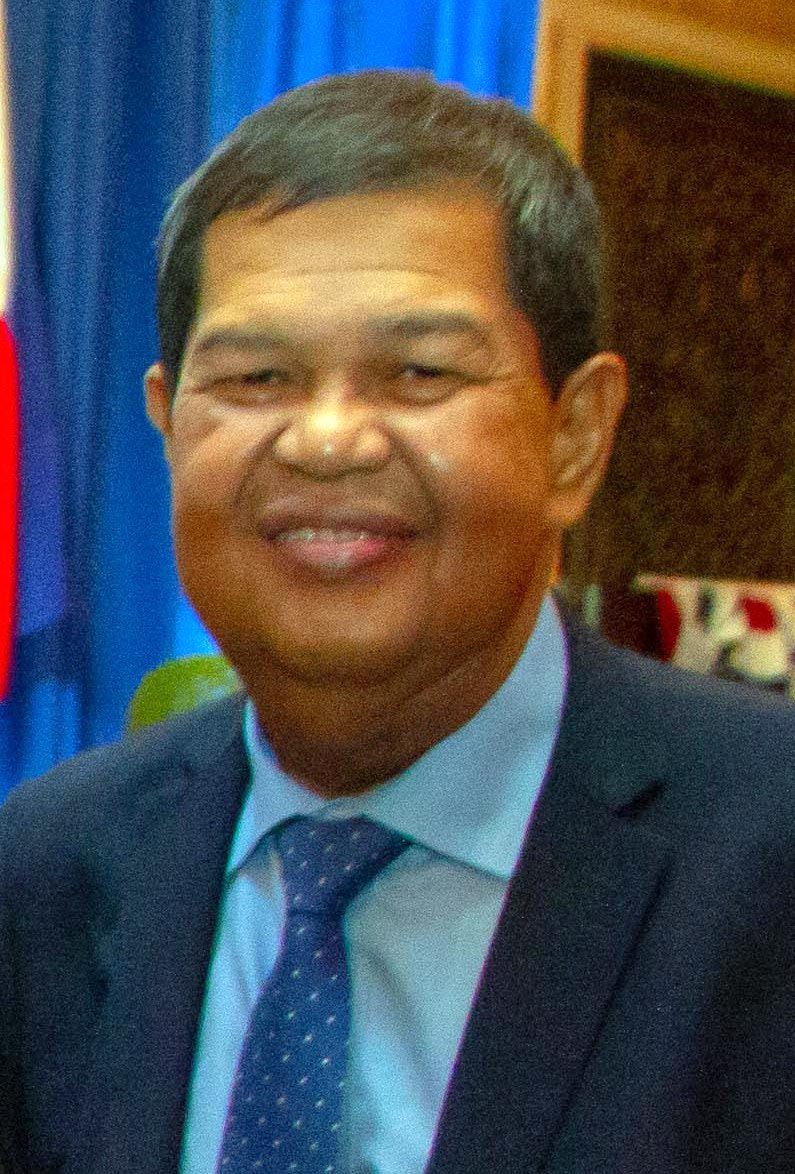
Nestor Espenilla Jr.

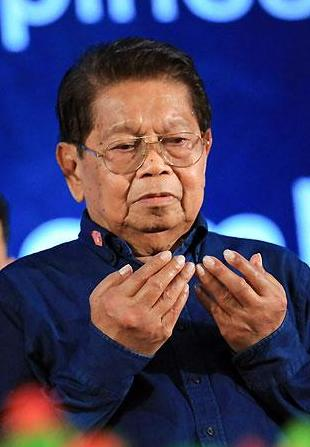
Ghazali Jaafar

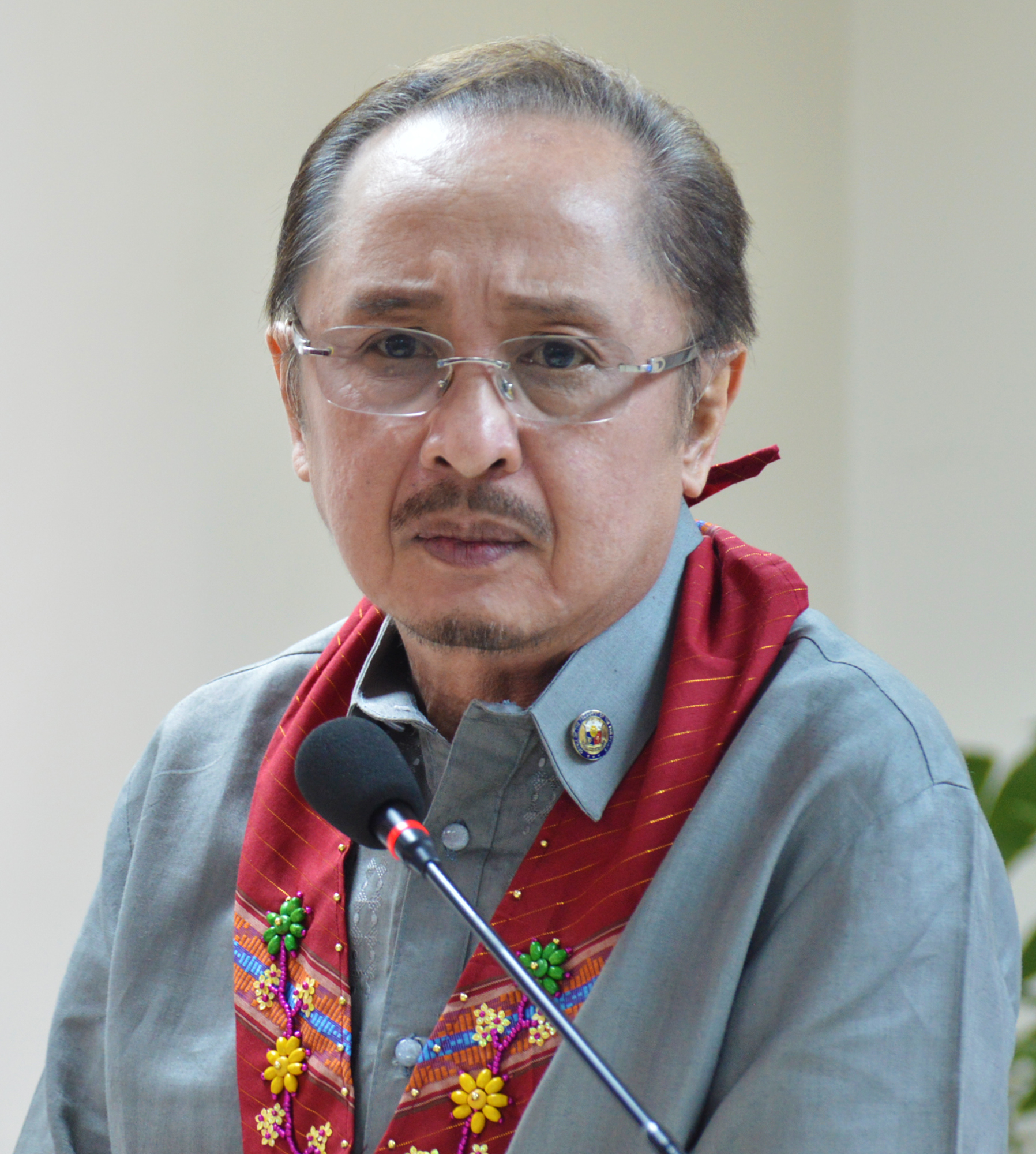
Abul Khayr Alonto

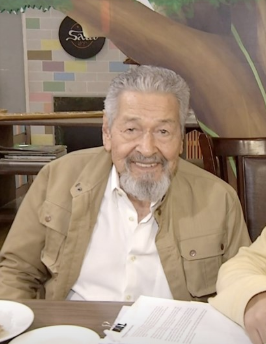
Eddie Garcia

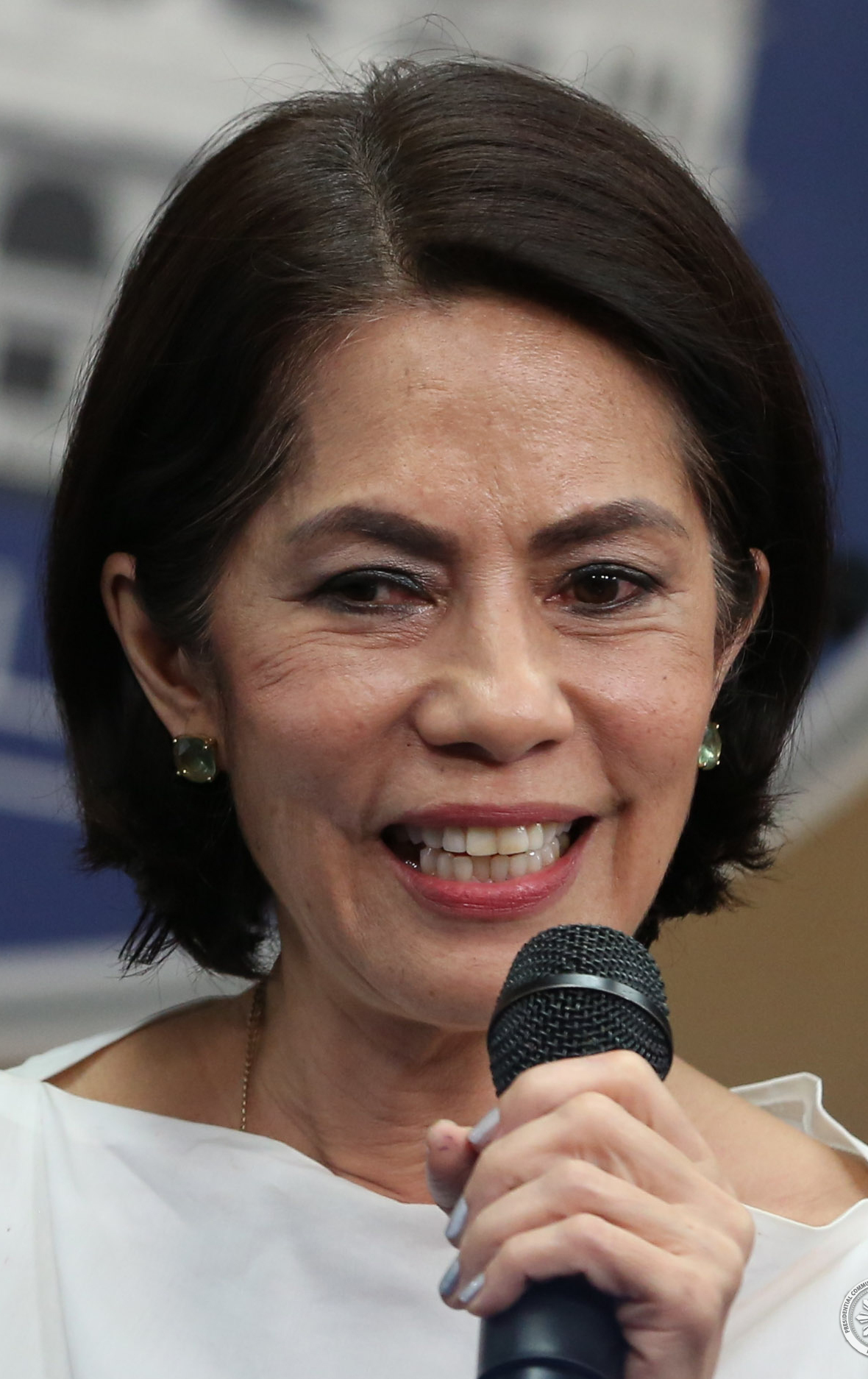
Gina Lopez

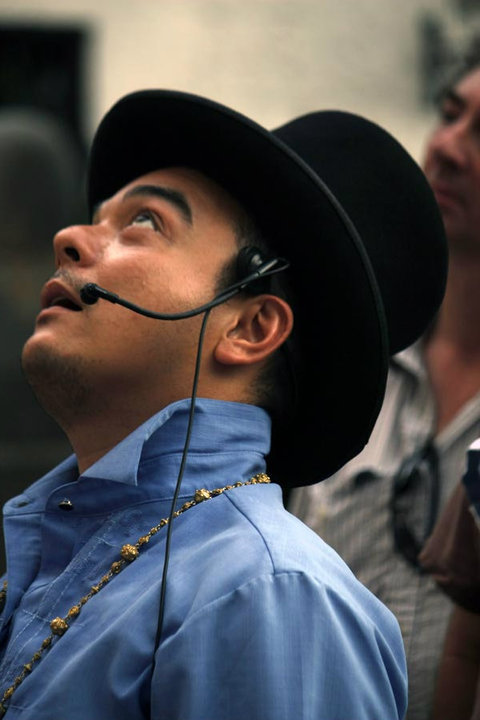
Carlos Celdran

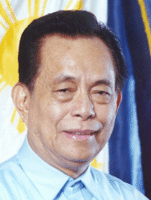
Aquilino Pimentel Jr.

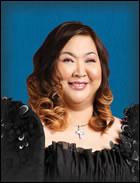
Milagrosa Tan

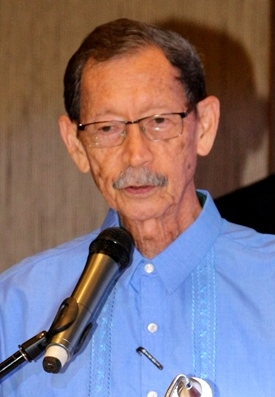
Edgardo Gomez

=== January ===
- January 7 – Carmencita Reyes, (b. 1931), Governor of Marinduque
- January 11 – Angelo Constantino, (b. 1970), bowler
- January 16 – Brian Velasco, (b. 1977), drummer (Razorback).
- January 19 – Henry Sy, (b. 1924), business magnate (SM Prime)
- January 21 – Leonardo Quisumbing, (b. 1939), Associate Justice of the Supreme Court of the Philippines (1998–2009)
- January 28 – Pepe Smith, (b. 1947), drummer and guitarist (Juan de la Cruz Band)

=== February ===
- February 9 – Bentong (comedian) (b. 1964), actor and comedian
- February 11 – Armida Siguion-Reyna (b. 1930), actress
- February 20 – Francisco Mañosa (b. 1931), architect and National Artist of the Philippines
- February 23 – Nestor Espenilla Jr., (b. 1958), banker and Governor of the Bangko Sentral (2017–2019).

=== March ===
- March 9 – Chokoleit, (b. 1972), TV host, actor, and comedian
- March 13 – Ghazali Jaafar, (b. 1943), Vice chairman of Moro Islamic Liberation Front

=== April ===
- April 16 – Jose Mari Gonzales, (b. 1938), actor and politician.
- April 19 – Rodolfo Severino Jr., (b. 1936), former Secretary-General of the ASEAN (1998–2002), and ambassador to Malaysia (1989–1992)

=== May ===
- May 4 – Prospero Nograles, (b. 1947), former member of the Philippine House of Representatives from Davao City's 1st District (2001–2010) and 22nd Speaker of the House of Representatives of the Philippines (2008–2010)
- May 7:
  - Karina Constantino David, (b. 1946) political activist and public servant
  - Vicente Emano, (b. 1943) former Governor of Misamis Oriental (1988–1998) and Mayor of Cagayan de Oro (1998–2007, 2010–2013)
  - Joel Virador, (b. 1967) former member of the House of Representatives (2003–2007)
- May 9 – Abul Khayr Alonto, (b. 1945) former chairman of the Mindanao Development Authority (since 2016)

=== June ===
- June 20 – Eddie Garcia, (b. 1929) veteran actor, director and television personality

=== July ===
- July 9 – Martin I. Tinio, Jr., (b. 1943) antiquarian, art historian, curator, interior designer
- July 21 – Claro Pellosis, (b. 1960) Olympic sprinter

=== August ===
- August 19 – Gina Lopez, (b. 1953) environmentalist, former DENR secretary (2016–2017), former chairperson of ABS-CBN Foundation
- August 20 – Ernesto Lariosa, (b. 1944) Cebuano writer, poet, and columnist
- August 21 – Julian Daan a.k.a. Esteban "Teban" Escudero, (b. 1945) radio personality (DYHP), actor, comedian, incumbent Talisay City councillor, former Cebu Provincial board member and Vice-Governor
- August 25 – Gloria Lerma Yatco a.k.a. Mona Lisa, (b. 1922) actress

=== September ===
- September 8 – Lito Legaspi, (b. 1942) actor
- September 13 – Rene Espina, (b. 1929) former senator and governor of Cebu
- September 21 – Mel Chionglo, (b. 1946) film director and production designer
- September 24 – Luisito Reyes, (b. 1930) former governor of Marinduque

=== October ===
- October 4 – Tony Mabesa, (b. 1935) film and theater actor and director
- October 5 – Amalia Fuentes, (b. 1940) actress
- October 8 – Carlos Celdran, (b. 1972) cultural activist and performance artist
- October 20:
  - Aquilino Pimentel Jr., (b. 1933) former Senator of the Philippines (1987–1992, 1998–2010) and 23rd President of the Senate of the Philippines (2000–2001)

=== November ===
- November 9 – John Gokongwei Jr., (b. 1926) business magnate (JG Summit Holdings)
- November 11 – Lucio "Bong" Tan Jr., (b. 1966) president of Philippine Airlines Holdings Inc. (PHI)
- November 30 – Milagrosa Tan, (b. 1958) incumbent governor of Samar

=== December ===
- December 1 – Edgardo Gomez, (b. 1938) biologist.
- December 9 – Miko Palanca, (b. 1978), actor
- December 21 – Gerry Alanguilan, (b. 1968) comic book author

== See also ==
- List of years in the Philippines
- Timeline of Philippine history
