= Emmanuel Piñol =

Filipino politician, journalist, writer and agriculture advocate

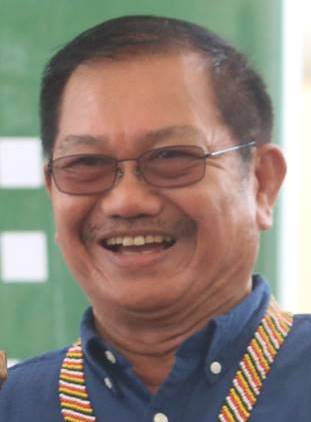
- Piñol in June 2017

Chairman of the Mindanao Development Authority
- In office August 5, 2019 – October 5, 2021
- President: Rodrigo Duterte
- Preceded by: Abul Khayr Alonto
- Succeeded by: Maria Belen S. Acosta

44th Secretary of Agriculture
- In office June 30, 2016 – August 5, 2019
- President: Rodrigo Duterte
- Preceded by: Proceso Alcala
- Succeeded by: William Dar

Vice Governor of Cotabato
- In office June 30, 2007 – June 30, 2010
- Governor: Jesus N. Sacdalan
- Preceded by: Jesus N. Sacdalan
- Succeeded by: Gregorio T. Ipong

Governor of Cotabato
- In office June 30, 1998 – June 30, 2007
- Vice Governor: Jesus N. Sacdalan
- Preceded by: Agnes S. Amador
- Succeeded by: Jesus N. Sacdalan

Mayor of M'lang
- In office June 30, 1995 – June 30, 1998

Personal details
- Born: Emmanuel Fantin Piñol; December 16, 1953 (age 72) M'lang, Cotabato, Philippines
- Party: NPC (2012–2017; 2021–present); Cotabato United People's Movement (local party)
- Other political affiliations: PDP–Laban (2017–2021); Liberal (2009–2012); Lakas (2004–2009); Partido Isang Bansa, Isang Diwa (until 2004)
- Spouse: Emilly Asentista
- Children: 3
- Education: University of Southern Mindanao (BS, MS, PhD)
- Occupation: Politician; journalist; writer; agriculture advocate; agribusinessman

Emmanuel "Manny" Fantin Piñol (born December 16, 1953) is a Filipino politician, journalist, writer, agriculture advocate and agribusinessman. He served in President Rodrigo Duterte's cabinet as chairman of the Mindanao Development Authority (2019–2021) and Secretary of Agriculture (2016–2019).

Born and raised in M'lang, Cotabato, he served as the town's mayor from 1995 to 1998. He then served as governor (1998–2007) and vice governor (2007–2010) of Cotabato. He had also worked for the National Grains Authority and was previously a radio and print journalist.

== Early life and education ==
Piñol was born on December 16, 1953, in Bialong, M'lang, in the then-undivided province of Cotabato. He is the second eldest of 11 children born into an immigrant Karay-a family from Dingle and Pototan in Iloilo. His siblings include, from oldest to youngest, Patricio Piñol, Magpet Mayor Efren Piñol, Cotabato 2nd District Representative Bernardo Piñol, Jr., M'lang Mayor Joselito Piñol, Noli Piñol Sr., Gerardo Piñol, Ferdinand Piñol, Nilo Piñol, and Cotabato Provincial Board member Socrates Piñol. He grew up in the family's rice farm and completed his primary, intermediate, and secondary education in M'lang where he was class valedictorian.

He worked in media starting in 1976. He was a disc jockey for DXCM, the radio station of the University of Mindanao, and a radio journalist and newswriter for DXMS in Cotabato City.

He is a graduate of the University of Southern Mindanao with a bachelor's degree in Development Communication (2006) and a master's degree in Rural and Economic Development (2008). In June 2018, he graduated again from the University of Southern Mindanao after finishing his doctoral degree in rural development.

== Government service ==
Piñol first entered government service in 1978 as a public relations officer of the National Grains Authority. In the same year, he became an editor for the Philippine News Agency where he worked for 4 years. His career in media also includes serving as senior copy editor and sports columnist for Tempo. He was also a writer for Interior Secretary Rafael Alunan III and President Fidel Ramos prior to becoming mayor of M'lang.

=== Political career ===
Piñol was first elected into public office in 1995 when he ran for mayor as a substitute to his father, former Cotabato Provincial Board member Bernardo Piñol Sr., in their hometown of M'lang, Cotabato. In 1998, he was elected as Cotabato's provincial governor, a position he held for three consecutive terms. During his term as governor, he supported several agriculture programs such as the Malitubog–Maradugao irrigation and bottom-up planning for the province's rubber, oil palm, banana, and coconut industries.

Barred from seeking another term in 2007, Piñol ran as vice governor of Cotabato and won with his former vice governor Jesus Sacdalan becoming the new governor. He is credited with having reduced the province's poverty incidence from 41.6% in 2000 to 25.6% in 2009. He was also known for his opposition to the Memorandum of Agreement on Ancestral Domain (MOA-AD) between the government under President Gloria Macapagal Arroyo and the Moro Islamic Liberation Front.

During the 2010 gubernatorial elections, Piñol was again a candidate for governor of Cotabato but eventually lost to Emmylou Taliño-Mendoza. In the 2013 elections, he again ran for the same position and lost again to the reelectionist governor.

In June 2017, Piñol took oath as a member of the ruling party PDP–Laban. He was also named as the point person for Cotabato. He was the third member of President Rodrigo Duterte's Cabinet to join PDP–Laban, along with Justice Secretary Vitaliano Aguirre and Energy Secretary Alfonso Cusi.

He was Secretary of Agriculture in June 2016. He stepped down in August 2019 amid reports of President Duterte's lack of satisfaction on his performance as Secretary.

He became chair of the Mindanao Development Authority (MinDA) after being appointed by President Rodrigo Duterte to replace Abul Khayr Alonto, who died on May 9, 2019, due to lung and heart complications. During his time as chairman, he went to the World Islamic Economic Forum (WIEF) in 2020 as one of the panelists. On October 5, 2021, Piñol resigned from MinDA and PDP–Laban to file his candidacy for the 2022 Senate election; he rejoined the Nationalist People's Coalition (NPC). He did not win a seat.

Piñol ran again for governor of Cotabato in the 2025 elections. He lost to the incumbent Emmylou Mendoza for a third time.

== Personal life ==
Piñol is married to Emily Asentista and they have 3 children: Maria Krista, Josa Bernadette, and Bernhart Immanuel. A native speaker of Karay-a and Hiligaynon, he also speaks fluent Cebuano, Tagalog and English.

Piñol also hosted DZRH's Biyaheng Bukid during Duterte's campaign season, eventually getting the early Saturday morning slot, but still reports in Damdaming Bayan's first part.

Political offices
Preceded by Agnes S. Amador	Governor of Cotabato; 1998–2007	Succeeded by Jesus N. Sacdalan
Preceded by Jesus N. Sacdalan	Vice Governor of Cotabato; 2007–2010	Succeeded by Gregorio T. Ipong
Preceded by Proceso Alcala	Secretary of Agriculture; 2016–2019	Succeeded by William Dar
Preceded by Abul Khayr Alonto	Chairman of the Mindanao Development Authority; 2019–2021	Succeeded by Maria Belen S. Acosta
