= William Dar =

Filipino horticulturist and civil servant

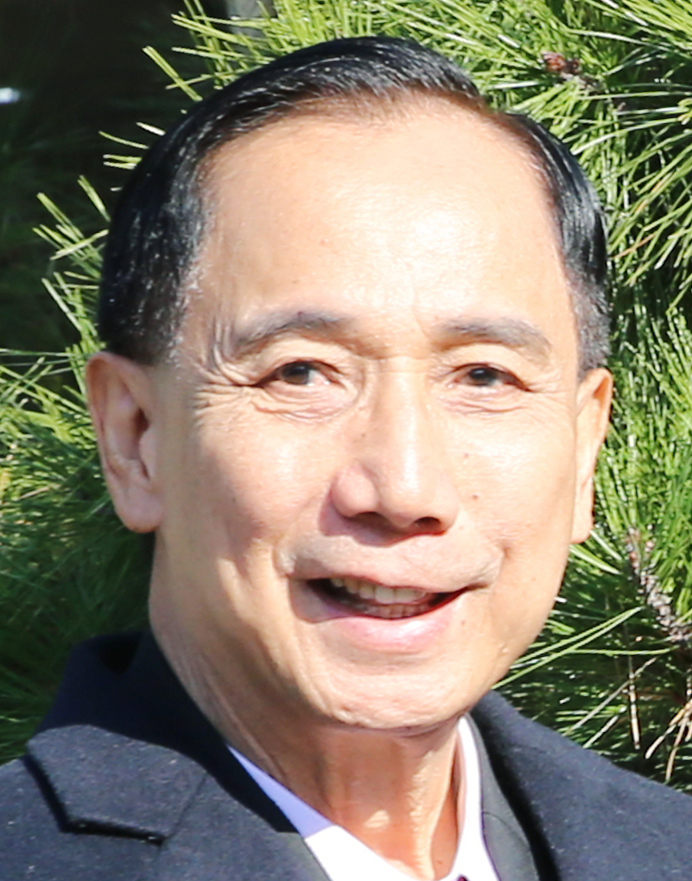
- Dar in 2019

45th Secretary of Agriculture
- In office August 5, 2019 – June 30, 2022
- President: Rodrigo Duterte
- Preceded by: Emmanuel Piñol
- Succeeded by: Bongbong Marcos
- In office June 30, 1998 – May 24, 1999; Acting
- President: Joseph Estrada
- Preceded by: Salvador Escudero
- Succeeded by: Edgardo Angara

Personal details
- Born: William Dollente Dar; April 10, 1953 (age 73) Santa Maria, Ilocos Sur, Philippines
- Education: Benguet State University (BS, MS); University of the Philippines Los Baños (Ph.D)
- Profession: Horticulturist, Civil Servant

William Dollente Dar (born April 10, 1953) is a Filipino horticulturist and civil servant who served as the Secretary of Agriculture under the Duterte administration. He was appointed by President Rodrigo Duterte on August 5, 2019, to replace Emmanuel Piñol. Dar held the same position under President Joseph Estrada in an acting capacity from 1998 to 1999. He is also a former Director General of ICRISAT.

== Profile ==
Dar was born and educated in Santa Maria, Ilocos Sur. A horticulturist, he received his Bachelor of Science in Agricultural Education and Master of Science in Agronomy degrees from the then Mountain State Agricultural College (MSAC), now known as Benguet State University (BSU), and Ph.D. in Horticulture degree from the University of the Philippines Los Baños. After serving on the faculty of the Benguet State University, he became the first director of the Philippine Bureau of Agricultural Research (BAR) in 1988. This was a period when the Philippines started to invest much in building a national system of advanced agricultural research institutes, such as the Philippine Rice Research Institute, PhilRice.

William Dar was designated the executive director of the Philippine Council for Agriculture, Aquatic, and Natural Resources Research and Development (PCAARRD) and served on the governing boards of international research bodies such as the IRRI and CIMMYT and at ICRISAT. He also served for a brief while as Acting Secretary of Agriculture and as Presidential Adviser on Rural Development during the presidency of Joseph Estrada. He was selected as Director General of ICRISAT in the year 1999. He has continued ever since in that position. He has written the book "Feeding the forgotten poor". Dr William Dar was conferred with MS Swaminathan Award for leadership in agriculture on June 24, 2013.

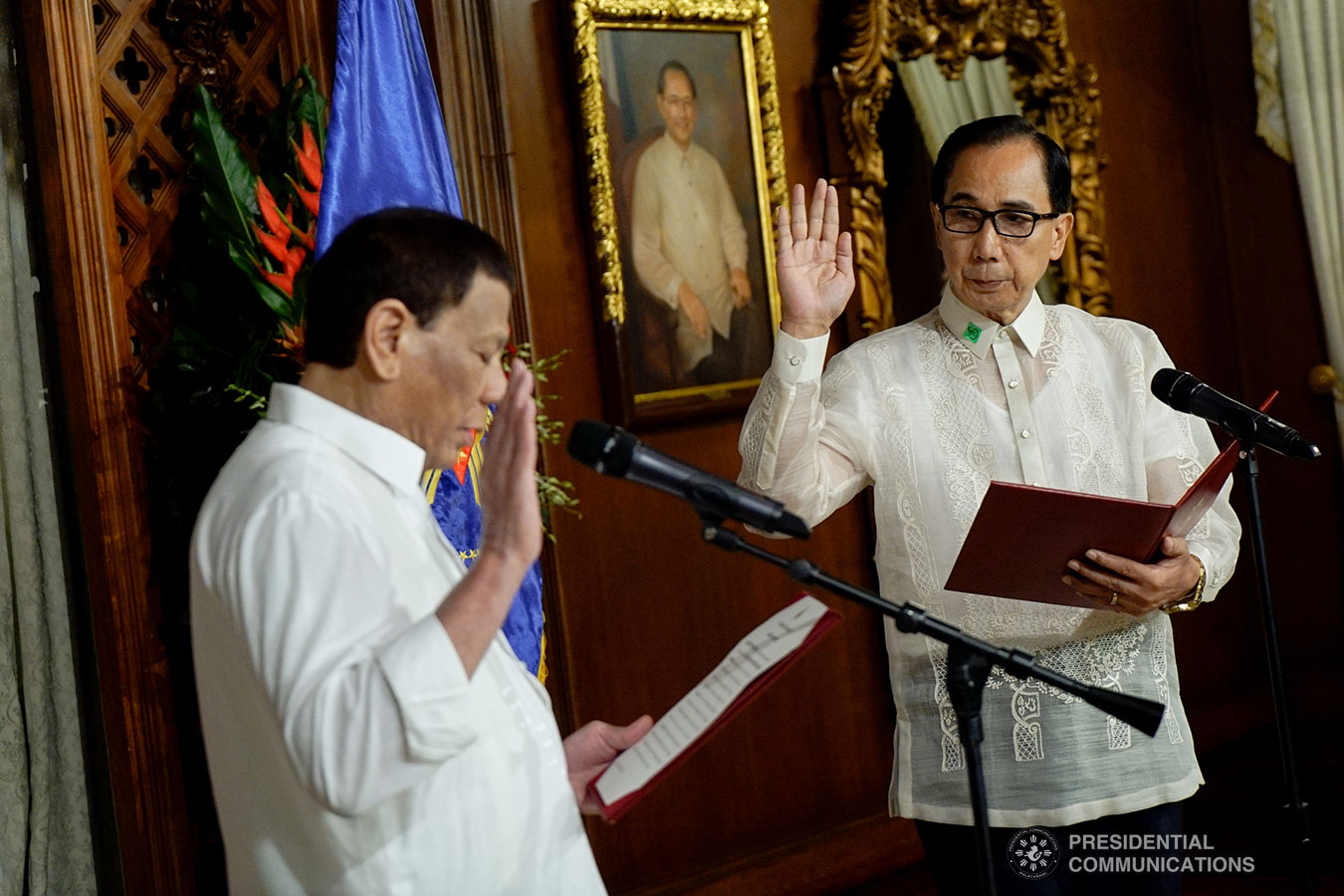
Dar taking his oath of office as Secretary of Agriculture in August 2019

On August 5, 2019, Dar was appointed by President Rodrigo Duterte to replace Emmanuel Piñol as the Secretary of the Philippine Department of Agriculture.

== ICRISAT ==
ICRISAT, which is an international agricultural research center in the consortium of CGIAR centers had faced multiple crises in the 1990s. The issue at the core had to do with whether ICRISAT should focus entirely on the arid land agricultural challenges of sub Saharan Africa, and move the headquarters to a location in Africa. The continued differences at the level of Governance over this matter had led to lack of clarity in research priorities and programs. During 1997–1999, there were three successive Directors General. William Dar is credited with steering this debate from one of India-versus-Africa to a more fruitful discussion on India and Africa. Agencies in India have granted significant financial resources to ICRISAT since 2002. An example is the Dorabji Tata Trust, one of the large charities connected to the House of Tata. In spite of increased support and expressions of relevance of ICRISAT research in India, a set of external reviews commissioned by the World Bank and the CGIAR Science Council in 2003 recommended the shifting of ICRISAT headquarters to a location in sub Saharan Africa. This recommendation was not accepted by the membership of CGIAR in the Annual General Meeting of CGIAR in 2003. Since then, investor confidence in the stability of ICRISAT has grown. The annual revenues grew from less than US$24 million in 2003 to $52 million in 2009. Major investors now include the Bill and Melinda Gates Foundation, besides the Governments of US (USAID), UK (DFID)and India (ICAR and DBT besides State Governments).

An important development in this period was the formation of a wide range of partnerships with non-corporate as well as corporate private sector in India. Some of the international administrators considered this development a risk to the reputation of an inter-governmental organization and it was included as a term of reference in an externally commissioned review in 2009. This external review in 2009 analysed the developments and agreed that there was indeed evidence of stability in programs and confidence among partners and investors.

Political offices
Preceded by Emmanuel Piñol	Secretary of Agriculture; 2019–2022	Succeeded by Bongbong Marcos (OIC)
Preceded by Salvador Escudero	Secretary of Agriculture; Acting; 1998–1999	Succeeded by Edgardo Angara
