= Jose Antonio Carrion =

Filipino politician (1948–2017)

Governor of Marinduque
- In office June 30, 2007 – June 30, 2010
- Vice Governor: Tomas Pizarro
- Preceded by: Carmencita Reyes
- Succeeded by: Carmencita Reyes
- In office June 30, 1995 – June 30, 1998
- Vice Governor: Teodorito Rejano
- Preceded by: Luisito Reyes
- Succeeded by: Carmencita Reyes

Personal details
- Born: June 19, 1948 Calapan, Oriental Mindoro, Philippines
- Died: March 27, 2017 (aged 68) Manila, Philippines
- Party: NPC (2004–2007, 2012–2017); Lakas (2009–2012); Independent (1995–1998, 2007–2009); PMP (1998–2004)
- Spouse(s): Armi Carrion; Imelda Papin
- Occupation: Politician, record producer

Jose Antonio "Bong" Nieva Carrion (June 19, 1948 – March 27, 2017) was a Filipino businessman and politician who served as governor of Marinduque in the Philippines from 1995 to 1998 and from 2007 to 2010. He was born in Calapan, Oriental Mindoro, and his grandfather, Juan Morente Nieva, also served as the governor of Marinduque from 1907 to 1916. In 2011, Carrion was implicated in the assassination of broadcaster Gerry Ortega, although ultimately all charges against him were dismissed. He was married to Filipina singer and politician Imelda Papin.

== Business career ==
In the 1980s, Carrion served as president of the record label Emerald Music Corporation in Quezon City, which released albums recorded by his wife Imelda Papin.

== Governor of Marinduque ==
Carrion first became the governor of Marinduque after winning the 1995 gubernatorial election; his wife Imelda Papin also ran for governor in Camarines Sur in the same year, but lost the election. He served from 1995 to 1998. It was during his term as governor that the Marcopper mining disaster happened in Boac, Marinduque. Known as one of the largest mining disasters in the Philippines, it was estimated that rehabilitation of the area would take 25 years and 300 million pesos.

Carrion unsuccessfully ran for re-election twice as a member of the party Pwersa ng Masang Pilipino, in 1998, 2001, and in 2004 under Nationalist People's Coalition. Carrion ran again in 2007 as an independent and successfully won the election, defeating the incumbent Carmencita Reyes. Carrion promised to focus on transforming Marinduque to an eco-tourism spot during his second incumbency as governor, detailing an 8-point executive agenda during his State of the Province Address. Carrion also spent his second term building infrastructure in the province, through coordinating with baranggay units in the creation of farm-to-market roads, construction of school buildings, and institution of agricultural programs.

In 2010, Ombudsman Merceditas Gutierrez ordered the stoppage of a "midnight deal" involving allegedly overpriced personal computers worth over P18 million. Carrion denied all charges of overpricing, and that no midnight realignment of funds occurred. He has claimed that the allegations were incorrect and misleading.

Carrion served until 2010, but was again unsuccessful in securing the re-election in 2010 and 2013. His final bid for re-election in 2013 was unsuccessful, and he was defeated by Reyes.

== Assassination of Gerry Ortega ==
On January 24, 2011, Palawan journalist Gerry Ortega was assassinated after finishing his radio show. One of the suspects, Rodolfo Edrad, Jr. confessed shortly after and claimed to be a former bodyguard of Carrion's. In Edrad's confession, he named Carrion and former Palawan governor Joel Reyes as the masterminds of the assassination. Carrion confirmed that Edrad was indeed a former security aide, however, he denied ever talking to him about any plot.

Ultimately, the Department of Justice dismissed all charges against him and 5 others implicated in the assassination plot due to lack of sufficient evidence to indict them.

== Personal life ==
Carrion was married to Filipina singer Imelda Papin, with whom he had one daughter Maria France Imelda Papin Carrion. Maria France graduated as a Bachelor of Mass Communication at the University of Nevada Las Vegas, and is now a paralegal. However, Carrion and Papin had their marriage annulled. Prior to his marriage to Papin, Carrion also had one son, Chino. After his marriage to Papin, Carrion went on to marry Armi Carrion. Carrion had one sister, Maria Rosa "Bing Carrion-Buck, who is an author.

== Death ==
On March 27, 2017, Carrion died in Manila, due to complications arising from lung cancer. He is survived by his wife, Armi, his son, and his daughter.

Government offices
Preceded by Luisito Reyes; Carmencita Reyes	Governor of Marinduque; 2007–2010; 1995–1998	Succeeded by Carmencita Reyes
