= Abul Khayr Alonto =

Filipino businessman and politician (1945–2019)

Datu Abul Khayr Alonto
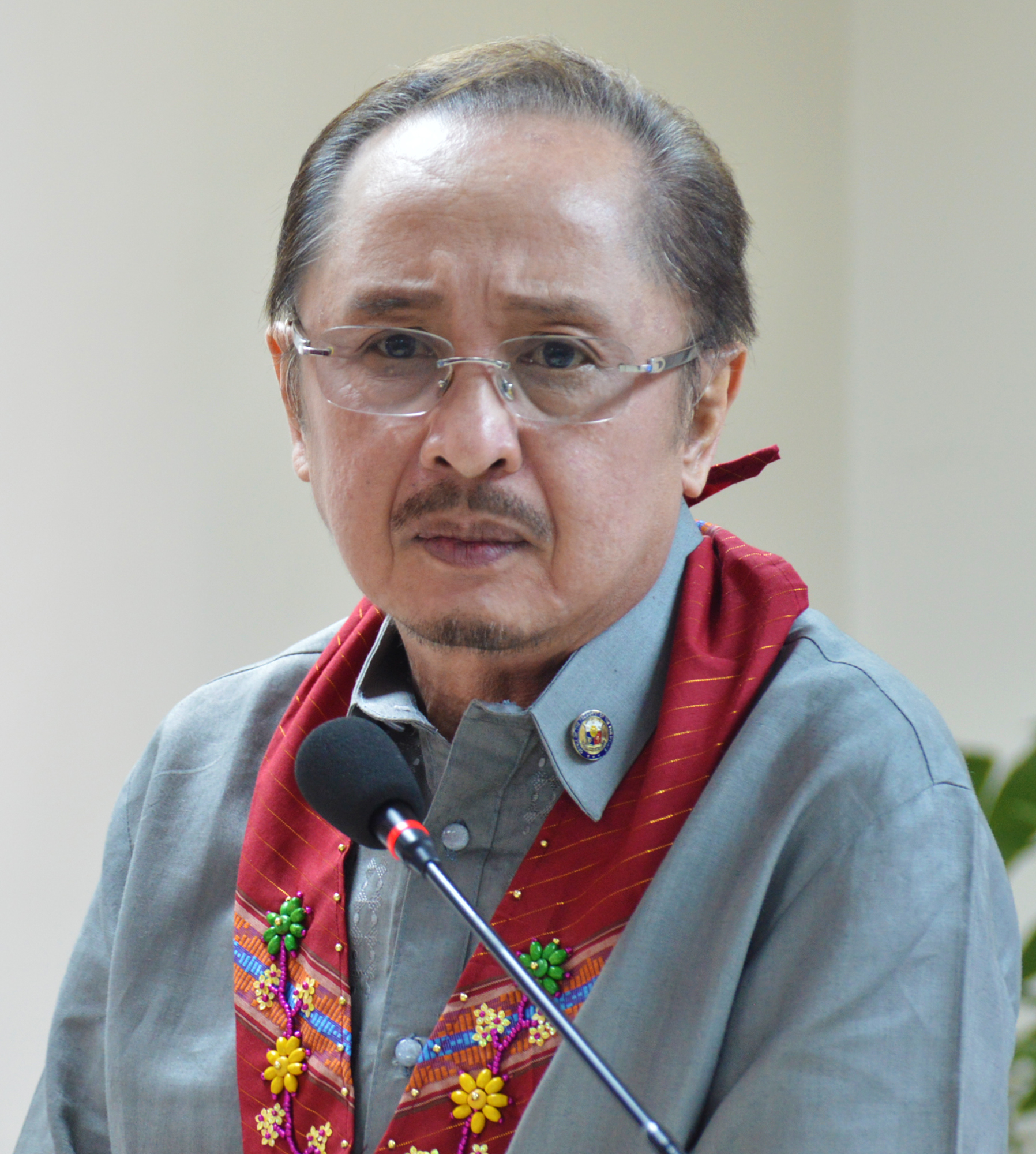

Chairman of the Mindanao Development Authority
- In office September 9, 2016 – May 9, 2019
- President: Rodrigo Duterte
- Preceded by: Luwalhati Antonino
- Succeeded by: Emmanuel Piñol

Personal details
- Born: Abul Khayr Dangcal Alonto; October 30, 1945 Marawi, Lanao; Philippine Commonwealth
- Died: May 9, 2019 (aged 73) Quezon City, Metro Manila, Philippines
- Spouse: Bai Norhata Macatbar Demarunsing Alonto
- Children: 6
- Education: Cairo University; San Beda College
- Occupation: Businessman
- Profession: Politician

Abul Khayr Dangcal Alonto (October 30, 1945 – May 9, 2019) was a Filipino businessman and politician. He was appointed by President Rodrigo Duterte in September 2016 as the chairperson of the Mindanao Development Authority, serving as its first Muslim chair until his death in May 2019.

== Early life and education ==
Alonto was born on October 30, 1945, in Dansalan (now Marawi CIty), in the then-undivided Lanao province. He was the second son of former Philippine Ambassador to Libya and Lanao del Sur's former governor Abdul Ghaffur Madki Alangadi Alonto, and Bai Hajja Rasmia Indol Dangcal. He has four other brothers and a sister.

He studied Political Science at Cairo University in Egypt and later became a student of San Beda College of Law. While a law student, Alonto organized the LAM ALIF, a Muslim youth group, in response to the Jabidah Massacre on March 18, 1968. Because of the Bangsamoro struggle, Alonto did not become a lawyer. Members of LAM ALIF would become core leaders of the Moro National Liberation Front (MNLF).

== Political career ==
=== Marcos regime ===
Alonto was elected as vice mayor of Marawi City in 1972 and was the youngest city executive of the country during that year. In 1974, he became acting mayor of Marawi but before being sworn in as the city's chief executive, he joined his MNLF comrades and went "underground" to fight against the abuses committed during the Martial Law regime. He was vice chair to Nur Misuari in the then-undivided MNLF. He was also the chair of the MNLF Northern Mindanao Regional Revolutionary Committee.

In 1979, more than two years after the 1976 Tripoli Agreement was signed, Alonto participated in the institutionalization of the Autonomous Region in Muslim Mindanao. He was elected as Assemblyman and sat as the Interim Head of the Regional Autonomous Government and subsequently elected Speaker of the Regional Legislative Assembly, in absentia after he resigned as the Interim Head of the Regional Autonomous Government.

In 1982, Alonto organized and established the Muslim Federal Party which became the rallying flag of the Muslim participation in the Protest Movement. In January 1984, Alonto was among the speakers at the two-day assembly of the Kongreso ng Mamamayang Pilipino (KOMPIL), an initiative chaired by Butz Aquino that sought to unite the various opposition groups.

Alonto was the Deputy Secretary General of the National Unification Council during the 1986 Snap Presidential Election and underwent serious studies on federalism in Malaysia, United States of America, Germany, and Switzerland.

=== Fifth Republic ===
In October 1991, Alonto became Nacionalista Party Vice President for Muslim Mindanao. He was nominated as Ambassador Extraordinary and Plenipotentiary and Chief of Mission to Nigeria and 21 African States in 1994, but was not able to take up the post.

In February 2014, the original members of the MNLF Central Committee installed Alonto as Chairman of the MNLF. He was a staunch supporter of the Bangsamoro Basic Law, a bill which sought for the establishment of a proposed new autonomous political entity known as the Bangsamoro Autonomous Region, to replace the current ARMM.

==== MinDA Chair ====
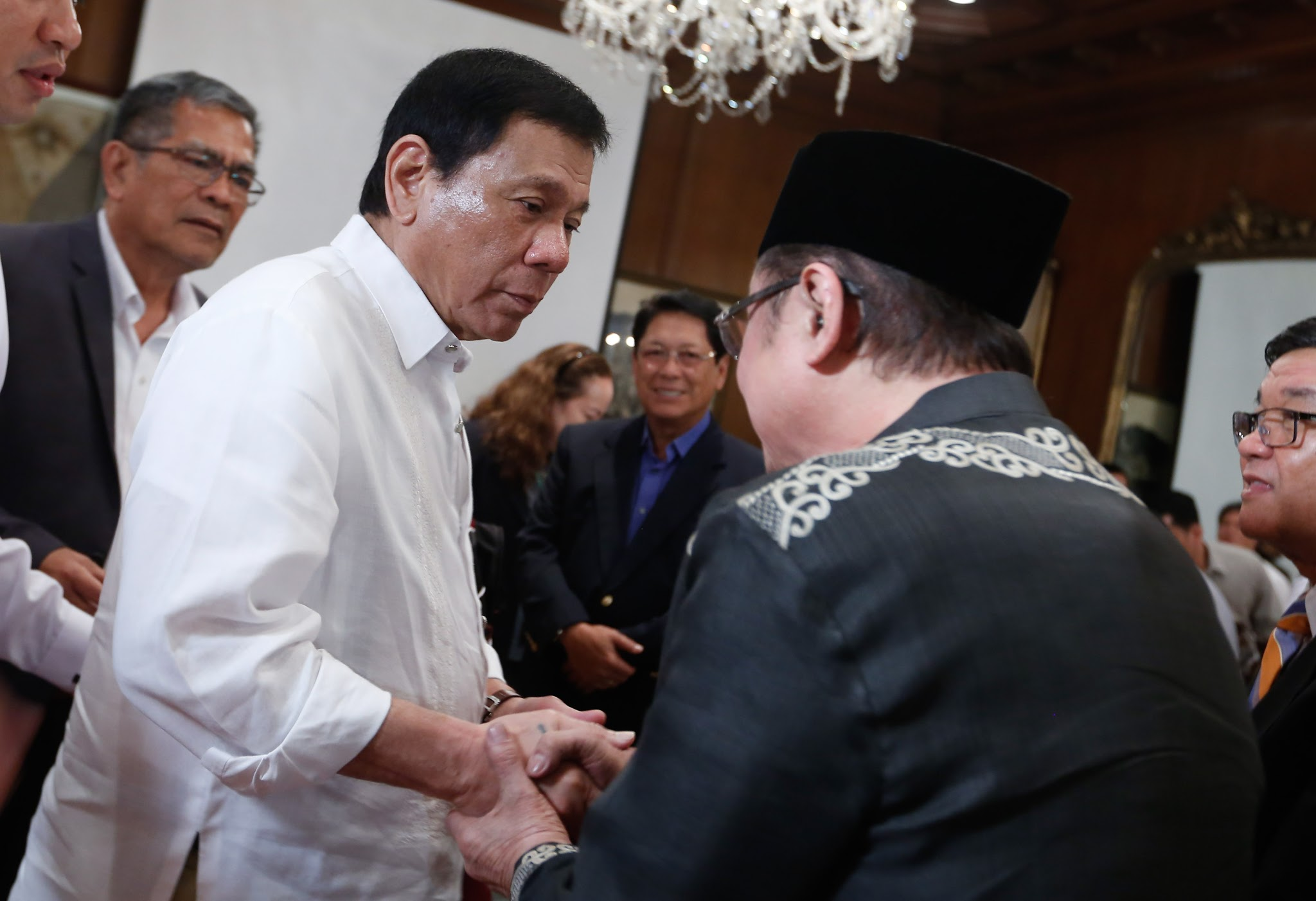
Alonto greeting President Duterte at the 6th Cabinet Meeting in Malacañang Palace, September 2016.

Alonto was appointed by President Duterte on September 9, 2016, as the third chairperson of the Mindanao Development Authority (MinDA), a cabinet-level position and having the rank of Department Secretary. He was the first Muslim chair of the agency since its creation in 2010 and was one of the five Muslim members of Duterte's cabinet, the other four being National Commission on Muslim Filipinos (NCMF) chairman Saidamen Balt Pangarungan, former NCMF chairwoman Yasmin Busran-Lao, former Technical Education and Skills Development Authority Director-General Guiling Mamondiong, and Presidential Adviser on Overseas Filipino Workers Abdullah Mama-o. As MinDA chair, Alonto also held various positions such as being the Philippine Senior Official for BIMP-EAGA and being an ex officio member of the NEDA and TIEZA Boards.

== Business career ==
Alonto also participated in business ventures and became Chairman of the Janoub Philippines Development Corporation, one of the pioneers in bringing in foreign investments to the Autonomous Region in Muslim Mindanao (ARMM) particularly the development of the region's palm oil industry. He was also a member of the board of National Steel Corporation.

== Personal life and death ==
Alonto was married to Bai Norhata Macatbar with whom he had six children– Amera, Ayesha Merdeka, Ameena Rocaya, Abdul Gaffur II, Abul Khayr Amalon II, and Akhzanuniza.

Alonto died at around 10 p.m. PHT on May 9, 2019, due to lung and heart complications. He underwent angioplasty operation, but his body succumbed to complications due to pneumonia. His death was declared at the National Kidney and Transplant Institute in Quezon City. He was 73 years old.
