= Water crisis in Metro Manila =

Water shortage in the Philippines

The water crisis in Metro Manila, Philippines is an ongoing crisis affecting many households in Metro Manila in the form of water interruption. The crisis usually occurs in the dry season, from March to May. The water suppliers, Manila Water and Maynilad, hold responsibility for this crisis.

== Crisis ==
=== 2019 crisis ===
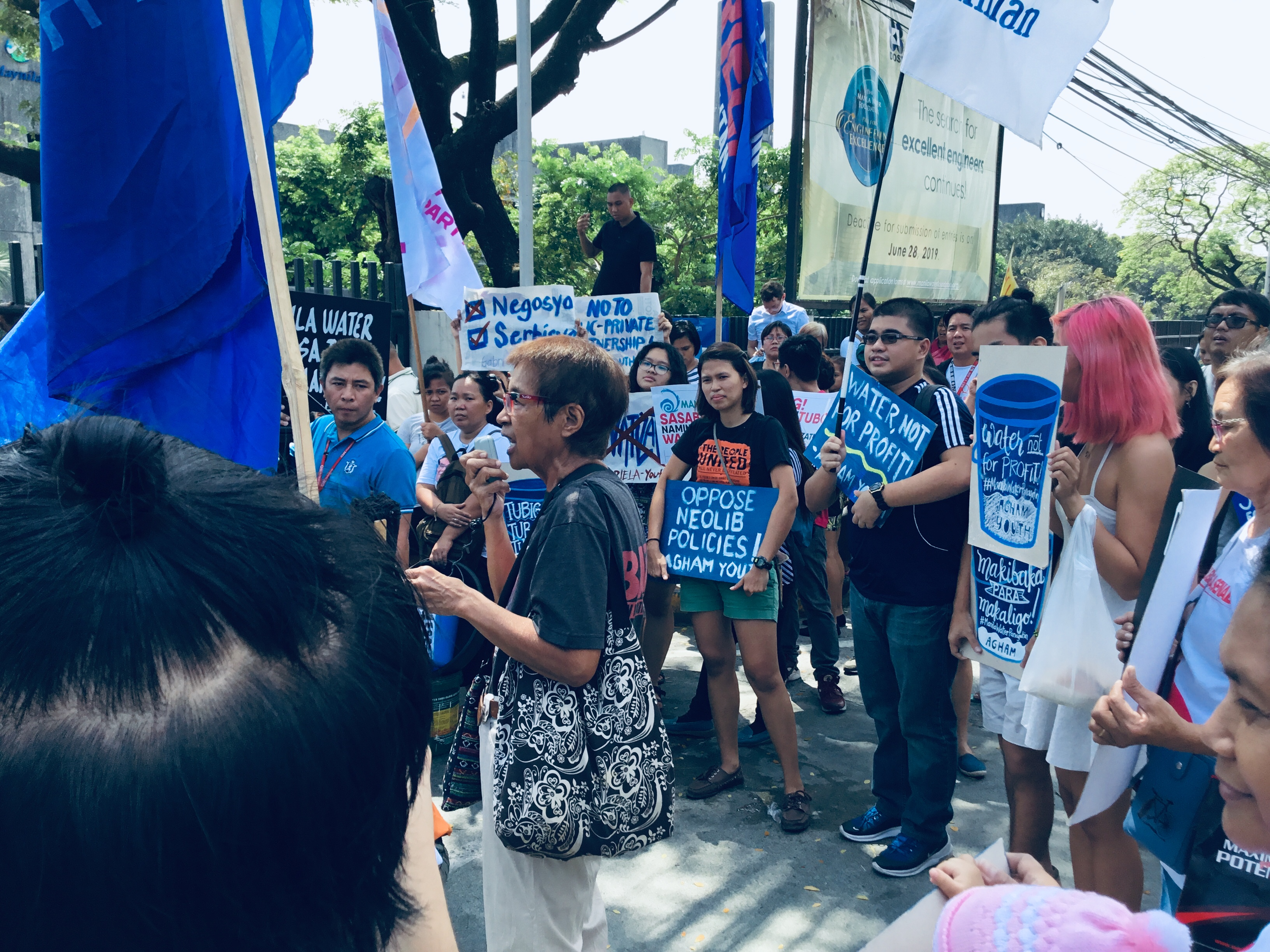
On March 15, 2019, different sectors rallied in front of MWSS regarding the water shortage.

On March 6, 2019, about ten thousand households across Metro Manila began to lose water supply. On March 11, the water level in La Mesa Dam reached 68.93 meters (226.1 ft) above sea level, below its critical level of 69.0 meters (226.4 ft) above sea level.

Manila Water COO Geodino Carpio cited the delay of water infrastructure projects, such as the construction of a wastewater treatment plant in Cardona, Rizal and the Kaliwa Dam in Tanay, Rizal, for the issue. Manila Water also noted the critically low levels of the reservoir held by La Mesa Dam, its lowest level in 12 years, which the company relies on as their emergency supply of water source. The affected residents had to wait in queue for the arrival of fire trucks to obtain water for basic needs.

On March 20, President Rodrigo Duterte threatened to terminate the contract with Manila Water and Maynilad amidst the water crisis. On March 22, 2019, it was reported that the Manila "was finally able to improve water availability to 96 percent."

=== Water interruptions ===
Due to low levels of water sources in Angat Dam and Ipo Dam, rotational water interruptions will likely to occur at any time (with the prior announcements from the water supplier) across Metro Manila. Other consumers had to wake up early in the morning to obtain the water for basic needs.

== Government Response ==
=== Public Rants ===
Since 2019, the two firms supplying water to Metro Manila and nearby provinces have been the subject of President Duterte's public rants, after they went to an international arbiter to demand the government pay ₱10.8 billion to recoup losses from rejected water rate hikes in 2015. In December 2019, Duterte threatened to jail and file economic sabotage cases against officials of Maynilad Water Services Inc. and Manila Water Co. Inc in what he called "onerous water concession agreements."

President Duterte ordered the cancellation of contract extensions that were previously granted in 2009 by former President Gloria Macapagal-Arroyo that authorized supply deals from Manila Water and Maynilad until 2037. This was the extension that succeeded the first concession agreements in 1997 under President Fidel Ramos that was set to end in 2022. Duterte ordered Solicitor General Jose Calida and Finance Secretary Carlos Dominguez III to come up with a new water concession contract that is favourable to the public and the government. He stated, "This is the amended contract, take it or leave it."

President Duterte threatened economic sabotage and imprisonment, stating "I will file this. Economic sabotage and I will arrest all of them. I will let [them] taste the life behind bars." In another speech in Malacañang, Duterte questioned Senate Minority Leader Franklin Drilon for saying "'Oh President Duterte, do not tinker with that contract because we will end up paying so many billions of pesos". Duterte responded saying, "Senator Drilon, are you one of those who profited from that? I'm asking you. I said I am ready to get out. I am not threatening you, but if I go down, I will bring you with me."

In Fifth State of the Nation Address in 2020, Duterte linked the dominance of the two water providers to his crackdown against oligarchs. He equated these firms to rich families and tycoons "taking control of the water, the electricity and power". The Ayalas own the controlling stake in Manila Water, while a company being run by Manuel V. Pangilinan is a shareholder of Maynilad along with the Consunjis. On November 26, 2019, Duterte slammed both private water firms of treating water like a commodity and not as a natural resource. "The contract is so one-sided, because if they fail to realize the profit during the lifetime of the contract or at any period, we will pay for their losses. You sons of bitches, if that is so," he said.

=== Foreign investments ===
According to the Duterte administration, at least 12 of the contract's provisions prevent the government from interfering in setting rates, and provide generous performance guarantees for the companies. Justice Secretary Menardo Guevarra, who is leading the review of the contracts, said public interest is the key consideration. Asked about the possible impact on business confidence, he said: "These profit-oriented foreign investments, we couldn't care less about them. What we want are foreign investments with a sense of corporate social responsibility." Investors fear the water dispute could pave the way for the state to probe other agreements it deems "disadvantageous," threatening the financial viability of companies involved, James Su, Fitch Solutions' infrastructure analyst, wrote in a research note in December.

As a result, companies such as Fraport AG and Suez SA have left the Philippines since the end of 2019. This has come due to foreign investors' inherent sensitivity towards countries' reputations in honoring contracts, said John Forbes, a senior adviser of the American Chamber of Commerce of the Philippines. Despite the Philippines efforts to compete with its Southeast Asian neighbors for foreign investment through luring companies to join an 8-trillion-peso (US$156 billion) infrastructure program, foreign investors remain uncertain.

In response, Duterte's economic managers have tried to allay such fears. Economic Planning Secretary Ernesto Pernia stated that the water dispute "is an isolated incident" that will not affect other public utilities in Metro Manila.

=== Turning to Singapore ===
The water shortage saw President Rodrigo Duterte turned to Singapore for help. On March 19, in an exchange with Singapore's Ambassador to the Philippines, Gerard Ho, President Duterte stated "We need a lot of advice from Singapore, and I'm sure the advice will go a long way to help us solve our problem, especially water." President Duterte was interested in Singapore's desalination plants, as a viable option for the Philippines. In response, a spokesperson from the Ministry of Environment and Water Resources said: "We are happy to share our developmental experience and support the efforts of our neighbours to build up their water sustainability." During that time, Singapore has five desalination plants which supplies up to 30 percent of Singapore's water demand.

Dr. Cecilia Tortajada, a senior research fellow at the Institute of Water Policy of the Lee Kuan Yew School of Public Policy (LKYSPP), said: "Singapore has developed very quickly, so it has the knowledge of advanced countries but it also has knowledge of how to solve problems of developing countries, because you still have the workforce that worked (and solved problems) in the 1970s".

Furthermore, it was noted that Singapore has good long-term resilience strategies and cost-effective water security measures for its water supply. "What can Manila learn from Singapore? Firstly, long-term planning and realisation of the importance of water as a strategic resource at the highest levels of government," Dr Tortajada added. She added that the setting up of desalination plants would not be enough; that the Philippines' water problems could only be solved if all levels of government prioritised the issue.
