= 2019 Reed Bank incident =

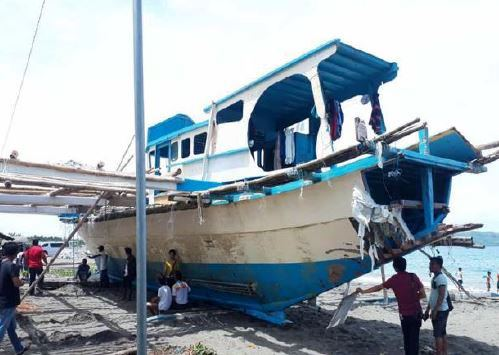
- F/B Gem-Ver's truncated stern is evident in this image taken after the incident
- Date: June 9, 2019; 7 years ago
- Time: 11:50 PM PST
- Location: Reed Bank, South China Sea; 11°34.557′N 116°49.888′E
- Participants: F/B Gem-Ver; Yuemaobinyu 42212; TGTG-90983-TS
- Outcome: Filipino vessel sunk, 22 Filipino fishermen rescued by Vietnamese counterparts
- Inquiries: Investigation initiated by Philippine Coast Guard and Maritime Industry Authority; joint Sino-Filipino investigation pending

The 2019 Reed Bank incident occurred when F/B Gem-Ver, a Philippine fishing boat anchored in Reed Bank in the South China Sea, sank after it was rammed by a Chinese vessel, Yuemaobinyu 42212, during the early morning hours of 9 June 2019. The stricken vessel's crew was later rescued by a Vietnamese fishing vessel.

An independent investigation by Philippine authorities later determined that the Chinese vessel involved in the incident failed to undertake measures to avoid colliding with the F/B Gem-Ver and abandoned the stricken boat's crew in violation of maritime laws.

== Background ==
F/B Gem-Ver (South China Sea)

F/B Gem-Ver sailed from San Jose, Occidental Mindoro, on 29 May 2019, with 22 crewmen led by captain Junel Insigne.

The vessel was rammed and sunk on 9 June 2019 by another ship described as Chinese by the crew while anchored near Reed Bank in the South China Sea. The whole sea is claimed by China as its territory, while a 2016 arbitration ruling determined the area to be within the Philippines' exclusive economic zone.

The ship that rammed F/B Gem-Ver left the crew floating at sea. Two of the crewmen managed to reach TGTG-90983-TS, a Vietnamese fishing vessel, after two hours of paddling; the rest of the crew were later rescued by this Vietnamese vessel, which sailed from Tiền Giang Province, Vietnam, in the southern Mekong Delta. The Filipino crewmen were turned over to the Philippine Navy and were taken aboard BRP Ramon Alcaraz. All but one of the 22 crew members returned home to San Jose, Occidental Mindoro, on 14 June 2019. A lone crewman was left behind to oversee the towing of the barely floating wreckage of their wooden boat back to its home port in San Jose.

Jay Batongbacal, director of the University of the Philippines Institute for Maritime Affairs and Law of the Sea, stated that the incident was unprecedented; it was the first time that Chinese maritime assets "deliberately rammed, sank, and abandoned a Filipino fishing vessel in the West Philippine Sea (the name used by the Philippine government to refer to parts of the South China Sea)." He further added that the incident could prove to be a tipping point in Sino-Filipino relations in the South China Sea; if no satisfactory action is passed on the part of China, it could "herald a new phase in Philippine-China interaction in the West Philippine Sea: one where we (the Philippines) will be forced out of the West Philippine Sea."

=== F/B Gem-Ver ===
F/B Gem-Ver is a Filipino wooden-hulled fishing "banca" owned and operated by Arlinda B. Dela Torre of San Roque, San Jose, Occidental Mindoro, Philippines. It is 19 metres (62 ft) in length with a beam of 1.8 metres (5.9 ft) and gross tonnage of 14.38. A diesel engine with a single screw powers it. The boat was built in 2000.

=== Yuemaobinyu 42212 ===
Yuemaobinyu 42212 (MMSI No. 412471286) is a Chinese steel-hulled fishing vessel operating from Guangdong Province, China. It is 44 metres (144 ft) in length and has a beam of 8 metres (26 ft).

== Investigation ==
=== Joint Philippine Coast Guard - Maritime Industry Authority investigation ===
Joint Philippine Coast Guard-Maritime Industry Authority report on the Recto (Reed) Bank incident

The crew believed that the ship that rammed their vessel was Chinese. Still, it was unable to provide the ship's bow number to the Philippine Coast Guard. On 20 June 2019, the joint Philippine Coast Guard - Maritime Industry Authority investigation was completed. Its contents were made public on 6 July 2019. Key points therein stated that:

- The incident occurred within the Philippines' Exclusive Economic Zone, approximately 140 nautical miles northwest of Piedras Point, Palawan.
- The F/B Gem-Ver had two white anchor lights fore and aft, a flashing white light positioned on its mast, and was equipped with a ship radar reflector. The weather was fair, with starry skies and a first-quarter moon. The sea was calm, and visibility was "slightly clear." Hence, no environmental factors could have prevented the Chinese vessel from seeing the Filipino fishing boat. The report concluded that the Chinese vessel "failed to take appropriate action to avoid the risk of collision."
- After the collision, the Chinese vessel maneuvered and halted "approximately 50 meters from the F/B Gem-Ver" with fishing lights on and was "considered to have direct knowledge of the distress situation" yet refused to aid the foundered boat. Hence, the Chinese vessel violated two maritime laws – the United Nations Convention on the Law of the Sea (UNCLOS) and the International Convention for the Safety of Life at Sea (SOLAS).

=== Others ===
Though equipped with automatic identification system transponders, Yuemaobinyu 42212, the ship that sank the Filipino boat, was shown to have either had a problem with the equipment or had turned it off deliberately during the period from 27 April 2019 to 12 June 2019, and therefore could not be tracked immediately before or after the ramming incident. An Oceana Philippines representative stated that "going dark" was common practice for ships engaged in illegal fishing.

== Reactions ==
=== China ===
On 13 June 2019, a Chinese Foreign Ministry spokesman pronounced the incident an "ordinary maritime accident." The following day, the Chinese Embassy in Manila released a statement via Facebook claiming that a Chinese fishing boat, Yuemaobinyu 42212, "was berthed near Reed Bank when it was suddenly besieged by 7 or 8 Filipino fishing boats". In attempting to evade the Filipino boats, the Chinese vessel's lightning grid cable dragged into the Filipino boat's pilothouse, causing the boat to tilt and founder. However, this Facebook post was later deleted.

China released a revised statement on 18 June 2019, omitting the narrative that Yuemaobinyu 42212 had been besieged by 7 or 8 Filipino fishing boats. The statement referred to the incident as an "accidental collision" between fishing boats. It offered sympathies to the Filipino fishermen.

In August 2019, Chen Shiqin, the President of the Guangdong Fishery Mutual Insurance Association, sent a letter to the Philippines apologizing for one of its member's ships sinking F/B Gem-Ver and subsequently abandoning its crew. It was initially reported that the apology was accepted, but this was later refuted by the Philippine Department of Foreign Affairs.

=== Philippines ===
Defense Secretary Delfin Lorenzana on 12 June 2019 (Philippine Independence Day) condemned the sinking of F/B Gem-Ver. In particular, he denounced "the actions of the Chinese fishing vessel for immediately leaving the incident scene abandoning the 22 Filipino crewmen to the mercy of the elements", an action which he described as "cowardly." Foreign Affairs Secretary Teodoro Locsin Jr. lodged a diplomatic protest regarding the incident with the People's Republic of China on the same day.

Philippine Navy chief Vice Admiral Robert Empedrad on 15 June stated that what happened to the Filipino fishing boat was "not an accident but a deliberate maneuver to ram the smaller vessel." Philippine Supreme Court Justice Antonio Carpio also stated that it was "highly likely that a Chinese maritime militia vessel rammed the Filipino fishing vessel." The People's Liberation Army 's maritime militia, estimated to field 300 vessels and 4000 personnel, is made up of civilian fishermen who receive military training and pay. Their boats are equipped with reinforced hulls for ramming other vessels, high-powered water hoses, and sophisticated communications gear.

After days of silence, President Rodrigo Duterte made a statement on 17 June 2019 about the incident, stating that this was a "maritime incident." For his part, F/B Gem-Ver captain Jonel Insigne declined to meet with the Philippine President; Insigne was described as "still too traumatized" by the incident to travel to the nation's capital. Duterte later stated that he was allowing China to continue fishing in the Philippines' exclusive economic zone. This drew a disappointed reaction from the fishermen concerned, so much so that even the wife of the Gem-Ver's captain stated that she would welcome Duterte's impeachment.

After the Chinese sent a letter of apology for the incident to the Philippines in August 2019, Philippine Justice Antonio Carpio emphasized that the author was in error when he stated that the incident occurred in the "waters of Reed Bank, Nansha Island Group." Nansha is the Chinese name for the Spratly Islands. Reed Bank is an entirely separate feature from any island in the Spratlys.

=== United States ===
The United States Embassy in Manila stated on 14 June 2019, urging "all parties to refrain from using coercion and intimidation to assert their territorial and maritime claims."

=== Vietnam ===
Vietnam released a statement on 20 June 2019, saying that its fishermen complied with international maritime laws when they rescued the distressed crew of the Filipino fishing boat. Ministry of Foreign Affairs spokesperson Le Thi Thu Hang cited the United Nations Convention on the Law of the Sea (UNCLOS) and the convention of the International Maritime Organization (IMO) and that Vietnam's vessels were discharging international obligations while operating at sea.

== See also ==
- Philippines v. China
- Scarborough Shoal standoff
