= 2019 Borongan ambush =

Incident in Eastern Samar, Philippines

- Location within the Philippines Location within Visayas
- Location: 11.643688°N 125.44023°E; Barangay Libuton, Borongan, Eastern Samar
- Date: December 13, 2019; 2:53 p.m. (UTC+08:00)
- Attack type: Bombing; Mass shooting
- Deaths: 4 (1 policeman, 3 civilians)
- Injuries: 14
- Perpetrator: 30 NPA rebels

At 14:53 PHT on December 13, 2019, a vehicle carrying seven police officers in Barangay Libuton, Borongan, in the Philippines was targeted by 30 New People's Army (NPA) rebels, detonating a landmine and shooting the vehicle, killing a policeman and injuring four others. Two other civilian vehicles were caught in the crossfire and secondary blasts, leading to three more fatalities and 12 civilian injuries. Overall, there were four deaths. The attack was condemned by the Commission on Human Rights (CHR), the Philippine National Police (PNP), Senator Imee Marcos, and Presidential Spokesperson Salvador Panelo. Money was allocated to the victims' families, and security was strengthened in several places nationwide. On January 6, 2024, NPA leader and one of the alleged masterminds of the ambush, Martin Colima, was killed in a clash between soldiers and NPA rebels, with 12 civilian injuries, including three minors.

== Background ==
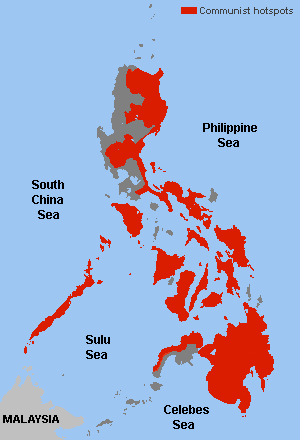
Map showing communist hotspots in the Philippines, with Samar Island highlighted in red

Borongan is a component city in the province of Eastern Samar, serving as one of the economic centers and the capital of the province. In Borongan, Barangay Libuton is one of the barangays encompassed by the Borongan-Guiuan Road, a segment of the N670 highway. Samar Island is one of the most affected areas by the NPA rebellion, according to the International Crisis Group (ICG). In the 1980s, two-thirds of Samar Island was under the influence of the NPA, and although offensives were launched that killed hundreds of NPA fighters, the insurgency recovered. In 2016, the NPA Second Congress was held in NPA-owned territory in Samar Island. That same year, numerous NPA members, including the Tiamzons, a couple that previously ran an organization that owned the NPA, the Communist Party of the Philippines (CPP), were released, the Tiamzons recognizing Samar as familiar territory. During the presidency of Rodrigo Duterte, he declared the CPP and NPA as terrorists in 2017, intensifying the campaign against them and requiring the European Union to halt providing project funds to specific groups that were allegedly fronts for the CPP and NPA in March 2019. Just a month before the ambush, a clash in Barangay Pinanag-an, Borongan, between soldiers and NPA rebels led to the deaths of six soldiers and at least one NPA member. A day before the incident, a village official reported a 10-wheeler truck and three motorcycles parked at the site of the ambush.

== Ambush and victims ==
At approximately 14:53 PHT on December 13, 2019, a PNP-marked Toyota Hilux patrol vehicle carrying seven police officers from the Dolores-based 1st Eastern Samar Provincial Mobile Force Company was allegedly targeted by 30 Cebuano-speaking NPA rebels, part of the Efren Martines Command in Barangay Libuton, Borongan. The insurgents detonated a controlled landmine and opened fire on the vehicle. The initial blast and subsequent gunfire killed Patrolman Mark Jerome Rama and wounded four other officers: Rick Capoquian Jr., Rey Sobrepeña, Michael Frank Pajanustan, and Kevin Operario; the remaining two officers were uninjured. Shortly after the initial attack, civilian vehicles traversing the national highway caught crossfire and secondary blasts. A tricycle transporting residents from San Julian and Dolores who were returning from a Christmas party encountered a landmine explosion. Additionally, a Mitsubishi L300 van carrying three passengers was struck by shrapnel from a landmine and fired upon by NPA rebels, injuring all three occupants. Initial reports documented two fatalities: Patrolman Rama and a 69-year-old civilian, Agripena Avilla Traboco, along with 16 injuries: four police officers and 12 civilians, including three minors. On December 15, civilian driver Anthony Balayanto succumbed to gunshot wounds at the hospital, bringing the death toll to three. On December 19, another civilian, Mary Grace Rapada, died due to a head injury sustained during the ambush at the Eastern Visayas Medical Center.

== Reactions ==
CHR spokesperson Jacqueline de Guia said that the CHR would launch an independent investigation on the incident and condemned the ambush. PNP Spokesman General Bernard Banac described the ambush as "un-Christian terror" and said that justice would be served for the victims, while Presidential Communications Operations Office Secretary Martin Andanar, Eastern Samar Governor Ben Evardone, Presidential Peace Adviser Carlito Galvez Jr., and Senator Imee Marcos denounced the attack. Presidential Spokesperson Salvador Panelo told the NPA to "stop attacks" if they want peace talks to continue, while Armed Forces of the Philippines (AFP) Spokesperson Edgard Arevalo said that they recommended a ceasefire with the NPA. A statement released on December 28 stated that the Efren Martines Command saluted the "successful" ambush led by the Sergio Lobina Command, adding that civilians were not injured in the ambush and were not near the site. The NPA stated that the government "perpetuated the lie" of civilian deaths in order to deceive the public and sabotage peace negotiations and that "Duterte, National Security Adviser Hermogenes Esperon, and Galvez are the true terrorists and lawless elements" for doing so. In another statement from January 7, the NPA repeated the allegations, adding that statements by the 8th Infantry Division also spread fake news to "cover up their defeat".

== Aftermath and investigations ==
On December 15, PNP Eastern Visayas officials visited the victim's families and said that their hospital charges would be paid by the PNP, while Borongan Mayor Dayan Agda said that 280,000 pesos would be allocated for the victim's families. In a press conference on December 16, the PNP Eastern Visayas spokesperson said that the investigation was ongoing and awarded the PNP Heroism Medal to Rama and the PNP Wounded Medal to the four policemen injured. By then, charges against the perpetrators were prepared, and evidence was in the process of consolidation. Stricter security measures were experienced in the five-day "Surfing in the City" competition held in Baybay Boulevard from December 15 to December 20 while the incident led to higher alert of the military in Panay, just before the NPA's 51st anniversary. By January 20, 2020, the CHR had not completed its investigation, having only the quick incident report, but CHR Region 8 Director Desiree Pontejos said that the investigation could be finished by February to provide aid to the victims, reporting that once the investigation was finished, 10,000 pesos of financial assistance would be provided to the victims. On June 11, the incident led Borongan City Mayor Dayan Agda to support the passage of the Anti-Terrorism Act of 2020.

== 2024 clash ==
In January 2024, Martin Colima, NPA's purported leader in the Eastern Visayas Regional Party Committee and one of the alleged masterminds of the 2019 Borongan ambush, faced charges of murder, attempted murder, frustrated murder, and robbery from several courts. Originally operating from the boundaries of Pinabacdao, Calbiga, and Basey, three municipalities in Samar, he and his men, consisting of 10 members, settled in Barangay San Gabriel, Borongan. Due to the villagers' opposition to NPA operations, the residents reported Colima and his men to local military units. Troops of the 8th Infantry Division were performing a combat operation in Barangay San Gabriel when they encountered Colima and his men on January 6. He was identified as a fatality after the resulting gunfight. Upon seeing their alleged leader dead, the men retreated, leading the military to seize a .45-caliber pistol and seven backpacks containing NPA documents and personal belongings. Due to the clash, 12 civilians, including three minors, and a soldier, John Deo Adao, were injured. General Noel Vestuir, commander of the 802nd Infantry Brigade, sympathized with the family of Colima and told them to collect the remains in Barangay San Mateo, Borongan. National Task Force to End Local Communist Armed Conflict Executive Director Ernesto Torres Jr. said that Colima's death served as a sign that the influence of the Communist Party of the Philippines was "waning" and that villagers no longer welcomed NPAs. AFP Public Affairs Office Chief Colonel Xerxes Trinidad said that the death of Colima highlighted the "leadership vacuum" of the NPA, while AFP Spokesperson Colonel Medel Aguilar said that the neutralization of NPA leaders like Colima signaled the end of the NPA.
