= Luisito M. Reyes =

Filipino politician (1930–2019)

Governor of Marinduque
- In office February 2, 1988 – June 30, 1995
- Vice Governor: Maximo S. Lim (1988–1992); Rosa Lecaroz (1992–1995); Rosario Jugo (1995)
- Preceded by: Aristeo M. Lecaroz
- Succeeded by: Jose Antonio Carrion

Vice Governor of Marinduque
- In office 1980–1986
- Governor: Aristeo M. Lecaroz
- Preceded by: Celso S. Zoleta Jr.
- Succeeded by: Salvador Jamilla

Personal details
- Born: October 11, 1930
- Died: September 24, 2019 (aged 88) Quezon City, Philippines
- Party: Kilusang Bagong Lipunan (1980–1988); Lakas-Kampi-CMD (1991–1995)
- Education: University of Santo Tomas
- Occupation: Politician
- Profession: Politician

Luisito M. Reyes (October 11, 1930 – September 24, 2019) was the former Governor of the province of Marinduque, Philippines. He was the brother of former Immigration Commissioner Edmundo M. Reyes and the brother-in-law of then Governor Carmencita Reyes. Luisito Reyes graduated from University of Santo Tomas with a degree in Mechanical and Electrical Engineering and ranked 3rd on the mechanical engineering board exams and ranked 7th in the electrical engineering board exams. He was the president of the Professional Society of Mechanical Engineering for a long time.

== Vice Governor of Marinduque ==
Reyes entered politics in 1980 after being the Chairman of the Professional Regulation Board for Mechanical Engineering for 20 years, winning as provincial vice governor. The Reyeses were under the Kilusang Bagong Lipunan Party of President Ferdinand Marcos. Reyes' Governor, Aristeo M. Lecaroz, was also from the KBL.

== Governor of Marinduque ==
Reyes was first elected Governor in 1988. As Governor, Reyes initiated many projects. The Boac Covered Court and the Jica Building in Marinduque National High School are just two of his projects in the province. During the term of Luisito Reyes, Marinduque was removed from the poorest Philippine Provinces. He was known to be the best governor Marinduque ever had.
