= Mindanao Development Authority =

Philippine government agency

- Pangasiwaang Pangkaunlaran ng Mindanao
- Logo

Agency overview
- Jurisdiction: Development of Mindanao
- Headquarters: Davao City, Philippines
- Employees: 117 (2024)
- Agency executive: Leo Tereso A. Magno, Chairperson
- Parent agency: Office of the President of the Philippines
- Website: www.minda.gov.ph

The Mindanao Development Authority (MinDA; Filipino: Pangasiwaang Pangkaunlaran ng Mindanao) is a government agency of the Philippines created through Republic Act No. 9996 or the Mindanao Development Authority Act of 2010. The office is mandated to promote, coordinate and facilitate the active and extensive participation of all sectors to effect socioeconomic development of Mindanao. MinDA is the permanent Philippine Coordinating Office (PCOBE) for the Philippines East ASEAN Growth Area (BIMP-EAGA), that ensures the active participation of Mindanao and Palawan in the sub-regional economic cooperation. The agency is currently chaired by Leo Tereso Magno.

== Board members ==
Board Member	Representation/Agency
Leo Tereso Magno.	MinDA Chairperson
Gov. Victor Yu	RDC 9 Chairperson
Gov. Henry S. Oaminal	RDC 10 Chairperson
Gov. Jayvee Uy	RDC 11 Chairperson
Mayor Ronnel Rivera	RDC 12 Chairperson
Gov. Dale Corvera	RDC 13 Chairperson
Murad Ebrahim	BARMM Chief Minister
Sen. Migz Zubiri	Senate of the Philippines
Rep. Mohamad Khalid Dimaporo	Chairperson, House Committee on Mindanao Affairs
Rep. Rogelio Pacquiao	Chairperson, House Committee on BIMP-EAGA Affairs
Councilor Danilo Dayanghirang	Union of Local Authorities of the Philippines President
Vacant	CONFED-Mindanao President
Abdulgani A. Salapuddin	Southern Philippines Development Authority Administrator/CEO
Guiling A. Mamondiong	National Commission on Muslim Filipinos Secretary
Engr. Sherwin Mylil S. Begyan	Private Sector Representative - Business
Sofronio V. Talisic	Private Sector Representative - NGO
Vacant	Private Sector Representative - Academe
