= Political families of the Philippines =

Nearly 250 political families, labeled "political dynasties" or "taipans", control the politics of all 82 provinces of the Philippines at all tiers of government. The development of cartels of mixed political and business oligarch families whose members hold multiple political positions and run various crony capitalist businesses has reshaped political alliances. Members of such dynasties, beyond their involvement in politics, often participate in business and cultural activities in order to maximize their share in the political spoils. These dynasties usually have a strong, consolidated support base concentrated around the province in which they are dominant. Approximately 234 of these dynastic families won positions in the 2019 midterm elections.

As of 2025, Philippine politics exhibits a marked increase in dynastic control, with approximately 80% of provincial governors belonging to "fat dynasties", up from 57% in 2004. Similarly, dynastic representation in the House of Representatives has risen to 67% from 48% in 2004, and mayoral posts held by dynasties increased to 53% from 40%. In the 2022 Senate elections, at least 12.5% (3) leading candidates had relatives already in the 24 seat chamber. Notably, 4.5% (800 out of 18,000) positions contested had single candidates from warlord political clans against whom no one dared to contest.

Political dynasties in the Philippines have significantly caused poverty, while critics and researchers have documented allegations of conflict of interest, rampant political corruption, nepotism, self-perpetuating cronyism, human rights violations, collective narcissism, and multi-party political scams and scandals. These dynasties are also involved in a rise in crime, such as extrajudicial killings and forced disappearances, with critics asserting that they have been able to operate with impunity due to alleged influence over the police, prosecution, judiciary and jail facilities and other public resources.

Although political dynasties are explicitly prohibited by the 1987 Constitution at the lowest level of local governance, such as in the youth-oriented Sangguniang Kabataan and under the Bangsamoro Electoral Code, political dynasties at all other levels of governance have been thriving despite the negative reaction of the populace towards them and their association with corruption. Notable "fat dynasties" in the Philippines (with more than one family member simultaneously occupying political positions), among others, include the Marcoses and cronies, Aquinos, Roxases, Dutertes, Jalosjoses, Estradas, Ampatuans, etc. More "fat dynasties" lead to more poverty.

Movements fighting against political dynasties include the Movement Against Dynasties (MAD) and the Anti-Dynasty Movement (ANDAYAMO) by civil society organizations; other efforts include the filing of Supreme Court petitions by lawyers from the University of the Philippines to compel Congress to pass a law banning political dynasties. Numerous anti-political dynasty laws proposed over the years by the late Senator Miriam Defensor Santiago, the Gabriela Women's Party, Alliance of Concerned Teachers, the Anakpawis and Kabataan party lists, Erlinda Santiago, and many others, have been systematically overlooked since 1987 by a Congress dominated by political dynasties.

== History ==
Political dynasties have long been a feature of the Philippine political landscape. Political dynasties started emerging after the Philippine Revolution when the First Republic of the Philippines was established. With the decline of Spain's economic power and international prestige in the 19th century, the expansion of British and American influence around the world, and the political current of emergent nationalism among the children of the economically enfranchised bourgeois, the power of the peninsulares, or Spanish-born aristocracy, declined propitiously. Following the defeat of the Spanish in the Spanish–American War, the surviving members of the principalía, or the Spanish-sanctioned landholding noble class, along with the newly ascendant merchant elite, who were mostly foreign expatriates or of Chinese origin, formed a de facto aristocracy to replace the power vacuum the Spanish had left.

Aristocracy survived and prospered under American colonial rule, and remained a permanent fixture in Philippine society even following its independence after the Japanese occupation of the Philippines during World War II. Over the years, political dynasties continued to adapt, as newer dynasties emerged to fill power vacuums left behind by the extinction of older dynasties. As of 2025, the majority of the elected positions in Philippine government are held by members of political dynasties.

== Philippine Constitution ==
The 1987 Constitution of the Philippines states in Article II Section 26: "The State shall guarantee equal access to opportunities for public service, and prohibit political dynasties as may be defined by law." According to the Philippine Institute for Development Studies, placing limits on political dynasties aims "to regulate self-serving and opportunistic behavior and to promote effective and accountable governance".

== Philippine laws ==
Despite the provision in the Constitution, the Sangguniang Kabataan Reform Act of 2016 is the only statute that has been implemented concerning the status of political dynasties in the Philippines. The closest explicit mention of political dynasties in Philippine law can be seen in Republic Act 7160 or the Local Government Code, where Book I, Title Two, Chapter 1, Section 43 states the term limits for local government officials. However, it does not include any limitations on the running of the incumbent's family relations or on the holding of multiple political positions by members of the same family.

(a) The term of office of all local elective officials elected after the effectivity of this Code shall be three (3) years, starting from noon of June 30, 1992 or such date as may be provided for by law, except that of elective Barangay officials: Provided, That all local officials first elected during the local elections immediately following the ratification of the 1987 Constitution shall serve until noon of June 30, 1992.

(b) No local elective official shall serve for more than three (3) consecutive terms in the same position. Voluntary renunciation of the office for any length of time shall not be considered as an interruption in the continuity of service for the full term for which the elective official concerned was elected.

(c) The term of office of Barangay officials and members of the Sangguniang Kabataan shall be for three (3) years, which shall begin after the regular election of Barangay officials on the second Monday of May 1994.

According to Prof. Ronald Mendoza, "Clearly, political clans have found a way around term limits, by fielding more family members in power—giving rise to more fat political dynasties."

On September 16, 2026, the Philippine Supreme Court ruled that Congress has a mandatory duty to pass a law to ban political dynasties in the country under the Constitution following a consolidated petition submitted by civic groups.

=== Sangguniang Kabataan Reform Law ===
In 2016, the Sangguniang Kabataan Reform Law (Republic Act No. 10742) was signed into law, which made some significant changes to the Sangguniang Kabataan (SK). It changed the age of the council from 15 to 17 years old to 18 to 24 years old and it forbids individuals from seeking a youth council appointment who is closer than the second degree of consanguinity, or those who have the same grandparents, from any elected or appointed official in the same area.

It is the first Philippine law with an anti-political dynasty restriction for elected positions, as stipulated by the 1987 Philippine Constitution.

=== Bangsamoro Electoral Code ===
In the Bangsamoro Autonomous Region in Muslim Mindanao (BARMM), the Bangsamoro Transition Authority legislated an anti-dynasty rule in the Bangsamoro Autonomy Act No. 35, known as the Bangsamoro Electoral Code. The law was enacted in March 2023 and approved by the Commission on Elections (COMELEC) on April 17, 2024. According to Section 3 (d) in Article IV of the Bangsamoro Electoral Code, "Nominees submitted by the RPPP [regional parliamentary political party] shall not be related to each other within the second degree of consanguinity or affinity."

=== Proposed legislation ===
Several bills have been filed in relation to the prohibition of political dynasties, and are currently pending to be approved by the Congress. Many have called for Congress to pass the Anti-Dynasty Law, but this bill has been passed over by each Congress since 1987.

In 2001, Bayan Muna filed an anti-dynasty bill in the 12th Congress.

In 2010, Bayan Muna Representative Teddy Casiño and others filed House Bill 3413 in the 15th Congress. The bill proposed a ban on political dynasties on the municipal, city, and provincial levels. It was the first anti-dynasty bill to be tackled on the committee level when a hearing for the bill was held on June 1, 2011. None of the political parties attended the hearing.

On January 24, 2011, Senator Miriam Defensor Santiago filed Senate Bill 2649, which prohibits political dynasties from holding or running for elected local government positions. The bill disqualifies the following candidates from running for local government positions:

- relatives of an incumbent elected official running for re-election up to the second degree of consanguinity, and are planning to run in the same province in the same election as the elected official
- relatives of an incumbent elected official that holds a national position up to the second degree of consanguinity, and are planning to run in the province of origin of the elected official
- persons that are not relatives of an elected official that are candidates to the same position in the same province in the same election but are related to each other up to the second degree of consanguinity.

The bill also prohibits relatives within the prohibited civil degree of relationship of an incumbent from succeeding to the incumbent's position, except for the positions of Punong Barangay and Sangguniang Barangay.

Three bills were filed in the House of Representatives that are similar in content to Senate Bill 2649:

1. House Bill 172 filed on July 1, 2013, by representatives under the Bayan Muna, Gabriela, ACT, Anakpawis and Kabataan partylists
2. House Bill 837 filed on July 2, 2013, by Representative Erlinda Santiago of the 1-SAGIP party list
3. House Bill 2911 filed on September 18, 2013, by Representative Oscar Rodriguez from the 3rd district of Pampanga

On December 16, 2013, the House of Representatives Committee on Suffrage and Electoral Reforms agreed to replace the three House bills into a single bill filed as House Bill 3587. The bill sought to limit the number of candidates from the same political clan from running for public office in a given period. The bill would give "the best and brightest from a disadvantaged family equal access to public service which otherwise could have been held and occupied by other members of political dynasties", said Representative Fredenil Castro of the electoral reform committee.

In 2016, House Speaker and Quezon City representative Feliciano Belmonte Jr. filed House Bill 166 titled "Anti-political dynasty Act" seeking to prohibit the proliferation of political clans in the Philippines.

Anti-political dynasty bills were also filed separately by Representatives Kaka Bag-ao, Tomasitio Villarin, and Nancy Catamco (House Bill 3861) in 2016; Agusan del Norte Representative Lawrence Fortun (House Bill 110) in 2018; and by Representative Rodante Marcoleta (House Bill 145), Senators Franklin Drilon (Senate Bill 11), Panfilo Lacson (Senate Bill 30), Kiko Pangilinan (Senate Bill 264) in 2019, and Robin Padilla (Senate Bill 2730) in 2024.

In 2018, 13 senators signed a committee report approving consolidated Senate Bill 1765 or the Anti-Political Dynasty Act of 2018, which seeks to ban political dynasties in the Philippines. The bill defines political dynasty as the "concentration, consolidation, and/or perpetuation of public office and political powers by persons related to one another within the second degree of consanguinity or affinity."

In July 2025, Makabayan representatives Antonio Tinio of ACT Teachers Party-list and Renee Co of Kabataan Party-list filed House Bill 209 seeking to ban political dynasties. The bill defines a political dynasty as a "family or clan that concentrates, consolidates, perpetuates their political power by holding public office simultaneously or successively". Gabriela Representative Sara Elago filed House Bill No. 4784 when she took her seat in Congress in September 2025. Both House bills 209 and 4784 ban relatives from holding or running for national or local posts at the same time, and from succeeding one another in the same post. In November 2025, Akbayan representatives Chel Diokno, Perci Cendaña, and Dadah Kiram Ismula, and Representative Kaka Bag-ao filed House Bill 5905. Senator Risa Hontiveros filed Senate Bill No. 1548, or the Kontra Dinastiya Act.

In November 2025, representatives Antonio Tinio, Renee Co, Sarah Elago filed House Bill No. 6193, which aims to amend the party list system law to serve marginalized sectors and disqualify candidates related to incumbent government officials, and disqualify candidates linked to government contractors.

== Statistics ==
Due to the increasing number of political dynasties in the Philippines, a majority of the positions in government are held by politicians that are members of political dynasties. In fact, in the years 1995–2007, an average of 31.3% of all congressmen and 23.1% of governors were replaced by relatives. In the 1995 elections, of the 83 congressmen elected on to their third term, 36 of them were replaced by a relative in the succeeding elections. The term "relative" here refers to anyone with a familial connection such as a wife, a son or daughter, a cousin, etc. In many of these cases, the people who would eventually go on to take their place had no previous political background or experience save their familial connection.

In a study done in 2012 by economists Beja, Mendoza, Venida, and Yap, it was estimated that 40% of all provinces in the Philippines have a provincial governor and congressman that are related in some way. Another 2014 study done by Querubin of the Department of Politics in New York University indicated that an estimate 50–70% of all politicians are involved or associated in a political dynasty within the Philippines, including local government units. In the same study, it was concluded that approximately 70% of all jurisdiction-based legislators in the current Congress are involved in a political dynasty, with 40% of them having ties to legislators who belonged to as far as 3 Congresses prior. It is also said that 77% of legislators between the ages of 26–40 are also dynastic, which indicates that the second and third generations of political dynasties in the Philippines have begun their political careers as well.

To analyze patterns of political dynasties within the 15th Congress, categories were formed according to the number of familial ties each politician had to politicians belonging to previous Congresses:

- Category 1: Those with ties to the 12th, 13th, 14th and 15th Congress as well as at least one family member elected into a local government unit between the years 2001 and 2010
- Category 2: Those with familial connections to at least one person belonging to the 12th, 13th, or 14th Congress
- Category 3: Those who share kinship with at least one person belonging to the 12th, 13th, or 14th dynasty, or at least one relative with a local government unit (LGU) position from the 2001, 2004, or 2007 elections
- Category 4: Those with at least one relation in the 12th, 13th, or 14th Congress or holding a local government unit (LGU) position in the elections in between 2001 and 2010

In a population of 229 legislators in the 15th Congress, 155 of them belong to the fourth category. Of those 155, 144 of them also belong to the third category. 84 of the 144 belong in the second category, and of the 84, 10 belong to the first category.

As of October 2024, 80% of district seats in the House of Representatives are held by political dynasties. In the 2025 elections, 40 of 156 party-list groups vying for seats in the House had links to links to political dynasties, according to Kontra Daya. As of May 2025, 71 of 82 provincial gubernatorial seats are held by political dynasties. A third of Senate seats is held by siblings: the Cayetanos, Estrada-Ejercitos, Tulfos, and Villars. As of March 2026, half of the 64 party-list representatives come from political dynasties, including relatives of President Bongbong Marcos and Vice President Sara Duterte.

=== Thin and fat political dynasties ===
There are two types of political dynasties, "thin" and "fat", according to the Philippine Center for Investigative Journalism. A thin dynasty is one in which a political clan is able to manipulate one elected position over time. A fat dynasty is one in which a political clan holds multiple government positions simultaneously. A political dynasty with five or more clan members active in politics may be called an "obese" dynasty.

In Mindanao, four congressional districts have been held by the same families for almost 40 years (from 1987 to 2025). These families are the Zubiris in the 3rd district of Bukidnon, the Romualdos in Camiguin, the Bautistas in Davao Occidental, and the Almarios in the 2nd district of Davao Oriental.

The extended political family of the Singsons in Ilocos Sur has been described as "super obese". At least 23 members of the Singson dynasty ran for office in the 2025 Philippine elections. The grouping together of several dynasties to control not just provinces but the whole country is called a "mega" dynasty, such as the partnership between the Marcos and Duterte dynasties.

According to Prof. Ronald Mendoza, "The more fat dynasties you have, the more poverty there's likely to be."

== Poverty ==
The 10 poorest provinces in the Philippines are ruled by political dynasties. According to one study, these provinces "are afflicted by low levels of human development, bad governance, violence and poor business climates". Research suggests that either poverty results in the creation of political dynasty or that these dynasties exacerbate bad governance and worsen poverty conditions. Although the study found a correlation, this does not determine whether it is a causal relationship, since poverty is multifaceted.

The study used empirical data that correlated political dynasty presence with socio-economic development. This study stated that "this partial correlation coefficient finds a positive relationship between poverty incidence and the proportion of political dynasties in each province."

== Corruption ==
Political dynasties have been blamed for worsening corruption in the Philippines. According to the Catholic Bishops' Conference of the Philippines, "political dynasties breed corruption and ineptitude" because political power is monopolized by political dynasties. Corruption can be through plunder, bribery, unmerited government contracts, or misallocation of funds.

The dominance of powerful families have also allowed politicians facing corruption charges to get elected into public office and escape accountability.

=== Stolen wealth of the Marcos family ===
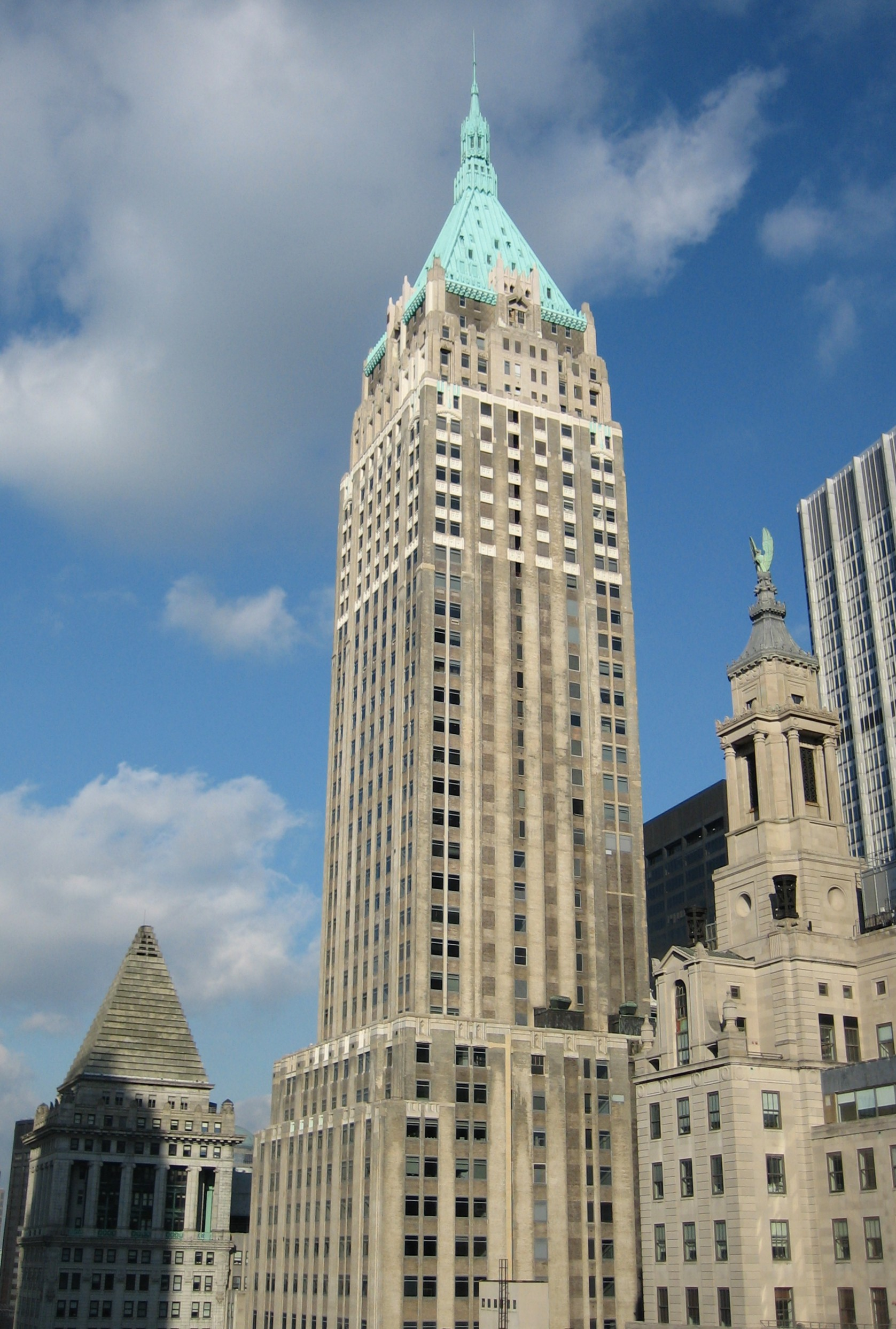
A 2005 image of 40 Wall Street, one of four Manhattan buildings purchased by the Marcoses in the early 1980s.

The Marcos family, a political family in the Philippines, owns different assets that Philippine courts have determined to have been acquired through illicit means during the presidency of Ferdinand Marcos from 1965–1986. These assets are referred to using several terms, including "ill-gotten wealth" and "unexplained wealth," while some authors such as Belinda Aquino and Philippine Senator Jovito Salonga more bluntly refer to it as the "Marcos Plunder".

Legally, the Philippine Supreme Court defines this as the assets the Marcoses acquired beyond the amount legally declared by Ferdinand and Imelda Marcos in the president's statements of assets and liabilities—which amounts to only about US$13,500.00 from his salary as president. The court also deems that such wealth should be forfeited and turned over to the government or to the human rights victims of Marcos's authoritarian regime. Estimates of the amount the Marcoses reportedly acquired in the last few years of the Marcos administration range from US$5 billion to $13 billion. No exact figures can be determined for the amount acquired through the entire 21 years of the Marcos regime, but prominent Marcos-era economist Jesus Estanislao has suggested that the amount could be as high as US$30 billion.

== Impunity ==
Political dynasties have been linked to impunity, as they tend to exercise control over the police and other public resources. According to a Philippine Star editorial, "Dynasty building undermines the criminal justice system, with clans controlling the police, prosecution, judiciary and jail facilities in their turfs. This has engendered impunity, as the nation has seen in so many brazen political killings."

== Critical reception ==
Various writers wrote articles that analyze and critique politicians that fall under the domain of a political dynasty. Often, these articles hold these said persons and families in a critical light. Although political dynasties have already been present in the Philippines for a significant period of time, the public has only recently started clamoring for a change in system. The public support for the bill against political dynasties has steadily increased because the president, while part of a dynasty himself, fully supports the passage of the Anti-Dynasty Bill.

On a provincial scale, political dynasties are often held in higher regard, compared to dynasties that oversee a wider public, where reception is mostly negative.

=== Negative ===
According to Ludigil Garces, Karl Jandoc, and Mary Grace Lu, political dynasties limit political competition, exacerbating corruption, poverty, and abuse of power. Michael Henry Yusingco keeps on discussing this and more electoral issues in broadcasting stations and advising the COMELEC and other private institutions to galvanize communities to address voter problems and communicate them to policy-makers.

One notable theory concerning the negative effects of political dynasties is a political "Carnegie effect", named after Andrew Carnegie. The "Carnegie effect" is based on Carnegie's decision to give all his wealth to non-family members, where he argues that his son might have less incentive of working hard if he were to be assured of his father's wealth. This idea of inherited wealth and connections discouraging future generations to work hard can also be attributed to dynastic politicians. Dynastic politicians have a significant advantage from the start of their political career as they have a statistically higher probability, likely due to factors such as popularity and incumbency advantage, to win elections when pitted against politicians with no such political networks. Dynastic politicians also have generally lower educational attainment, because of their reliance on dynastic connections rather than bureaucratic or academic competence for their position.

There is also significant evidence to suggest that Philippine political dynasties use their political dominance over their respective regions to enrich themselves, using methods such as graft or outright bribery of legislators. These kinds of situations arise as conflicts of interests—political dynasties often hold significant economic power in a province—and their interests are overrepresented due to dynastic politics.

Political dynasties also tend to maintain the status quo and develop interests largely separate from the people they were supposed to be serving. Dynastic candidates, being almost exclusively from the upper classes, are naturally biased towards defending their own vested economic interests, which presents conflict of interest problems. Political dynasties also prevent challengers with potentially effective policy ideas from being able to take office, which limits the capacity for bureaucratic responsiveness and administrative effectiveness and adaptation to new ideas.

=== Positive ===
According to Mancur Olson's theory of political governance or the "Roving Bandits vs. Stationary Bandits" theory, dynastic politicians are more likely to pursue long-term development-oriented strategies since they expect to hold power and benefit from their position for longer. This is usually set in contrast to non-dynastic politicians who would, under this theory, have less incentive to develop due to their limited term. Political dynasties have in theory increased women's political participation in politics. Female politicians hailing from political dynasties can easily get into politics due to their connections.

== Anti-political dynasty movements ==
On March 21, 2018, President Rodrigo Duterte in favored of the anti-political dynasty provisions as proposed by the Consultative Committee (ConCom) created to review the 1987 Constitution.

Among the civil society organizations that campaign against political dynasties are the Movement Against Dynasties (MAD) and the Anti-Dynasty Movement (ANDAYAMO). In 2019, MAD organized a petition signing to pressure legislators into passing a law banning political dynasties. Election watchdog Kontra Daya conducts studies on political dynasties that field candidates in elections for party-list representatives. The Legal Network for Truthful Elections (LENTE), which monitors politicians' abuse of social welfare programs, government vehicles, and other public resources during elections, said that places dominated by political dynasties have increased risks for corruption.

Lawyers from the University of the Philippines filed a petition in 2024 asking the Supreme Court to compel Congress to pass a law banning political dynasties. In 2025, 1Sambayan led the filing of a petition to ask the Supreme Court to urge Congress to file a bill banning political dynasties.

== List of families ==
=== Ampatuan ===
The Ampatuan family has exercised political crowd control over the Maguindanao region since 2001, with several of its members holding positions in government. The family's patriarch, Andal Ampatuan Sr., was elected Governor of Maguindanao in 2001. His sons, Andal Ampatuan Jr. and Zaldy Ampatuan, were the former mayor of Datu Unsay and former governor of the Autonomous Region in Muslim Mindanao respectively. 80 members of the Ampatuan family ran for governmental positions during the 2013 elections. The Ampatuans' rise to power is attributed to support received from President Gloria Macapagal Arroyo. As a result of their connection, the Ampatuans won Arroyo a large majority of votes from Maguindanao during the 2004 presidential elections. The Arroyo administration's issuance of Executive Order 546 then allowed the Ampatuans to form their own private army, also known as civilian volunteer organizations.

Despite their prominence in Maguindanao, the Ampatuans were generally unheard of outside of the region until the 2009 Maguindanao massacre. They were charged and sentenced for their involvement in the massacre that killed 57 people. The victims had been on their way to file the candidacy of Esmael "Toto" Mangudadatu for the 2010 elections when they were stopped by an armed convoy. They were later abducted and murdered; some victims were also reported to have been raped. After the discovery of the mass graves, President Arroyo declared martial law in Maguindanao. 198 people, including Andal Ampatuan Sr. and Andal Ampatuan Jr., were charged with murder. Charges against some of the suspects were later dropped. Andal Sr., suspected to be the mastermind behind the massacre, died on July 17, 2015.

Brothers Datu Andal Jr., Zaldy, and Anwar Ampatuan Sr. were convicted of 57 counts of murder and sentenced to life imprisonment without parole on December 19, 2019. A total of 28 people, including other Ampatuan clan members and police officers were sentenced to life imprisonment.

=== Aquino ===
The Aquinos are a political family that originated from Tarlac. The dynasty began with Servillano Aquino, a general during the Philippine Revolution and delegate of the Malolos Congress. His son, Benigno Aquino Sr., was a speaker in the House of Representatives during the Japanese-sponsored Second Philippine Republic. He was charged and arrested for collaborating with the Japanese during World War II. The most prominent member of the family, Benigno Aquino Jr., was a leading figure in the opposition against the Marcos regime who was assassinated on the tarmac in the Manila International Airport in 1983 upon arriving from exile. After his death, his wife, Corazon Aquino became active in politics, becoming a key figure during the People Power Revolution. She later became the first female president of the Philippines after Ferdinand Marcos was exiled in 1986. Her term was marred by the restoration of democratic institutions, the Mendiola massacre, the 9 Coup d'etat attempts during her term and disasters such as the sinking of the MV Doña Paz, the 1990 Luzon earthquake, the Eruption of Mount Pinatubo and the Ormoc flash flood. Her death in 2009 garnered widespread public support reminiscent of her husband's which resulted in support for her son, Benigno Aquino III's successful campaign to become the Philippines' 15th president from 2010 to 2016.

Other prominent members of the family include the first cousin of Benigno III, Bam Aquino, who served as senator from 2013 to 2019 and 2025 to present. Other politicians from the Aquino family with a direct lineage to Sevillano Aquino include Benigno Jr.'s siblings Butz Aquino who was a senator from 1987 to 1995, and Tessie Aquino who was a senator from 1995 to 2004.

=== Binay ===
The Binay political family started with Jejomar "Jojo" Cabauatan Binay, a human rights lawyer who represented political prisoners for free in the 1970s during the Martial Law period of President Ferdinand Marcos. When Marcos was toppled in 1986, President Corazon Aquino appointed Jojo Binay as acting mayor of Makati. After a year, he was appointed as acting governor of Metro Manila. In 1988, he was elected for his first official term as mayor of Makati and served three terms successively until 1998. After a three-year break, during which his wife Elenita served as mayor, he was elected again in 2001 as mayor and served for another three terms until 2010 when he became the 13th Vice President of the Philippines under Benigno Aquino III. He ran for the presidency but lost his bid to Rodrigo Duterte in the 2016 Elections. He ran for Congress representing the 1st District of Makati City in the 2019 elections but lost. He also ran for senator in the 2022 elections but also lost.

Among his five children, three of them joined him in politics as well, alternating between each other in the mayorship of Makati City. The eldest, Nancy Binay, was elected Senator in 2013 and landed 5th among 12 elected senators despite her having no prior government experience. She was reelected in 2019 for a second term. Another daughter Abigail Binay, a lawyer, is the incumbent mayor of Makati City. Abigail was previously elected as congressional representative of the 2nd district of Makati City in 2007 and served for three terms until her election as mayor in 2016. His only son Jejomar Binay Jr. also served as mayor of Makati City when he was elected in 2010 but in 2015 he was unseated by the Ombudsman of the Philippines. He is perpetually banned from holding any public office after the Court of Appeals affirmed the charges of grave misconduct, dishonesty and conduct prejudicial to the best interest of the service over the construction of a Makati school building on May 28, 2019. The mayorship of Makati City has been held by the Binays for 37 years since 1988.

=== Duterte ===
The Duterte political family began with Vicente "Nene" Gonzales Duterte, a lawyer and former mayor of Danao, Cebu in 1945 who in 1946, migrated with his family to Davao to practice law and became a governor of the then-unified province of Davao in 1959 until 1965 when President Ferdinand Marcos appointed him as Secretary of General Services which position he held until his death in 1968. Although Davao became a stronghold of the Dutertes, his hometown Danao remains a bailiwick of the Duterte clan whose family members took turns dominating Danao's local politics. While his nephew Ronald Regis Duterte, also a lawyer, was a member of the legislative council of Cebu City for 17 years since 1963 with three consecutive terms before becoming its vice mayor in 1980 and ultimately as mayor in 1983. Ronald became the president of the then University of Southern Philippines (USP) in 1991 and later on as dean of its college of law.

His son Rodrigo "Digong" Duterte, also a lawyer, who followed his political footsteps in Davao, became the 16th President of the Philippines after winning in the 2016 presidential election. He served until 2022 Before becoming president, he was a mayor of Davao City for 22 years serving for seven terms. At 71, he is the oldest person to assume the presidency and the first to hail from Mindanao.

Other prominent members of the Duterte family include Rodrigo's children: Sara Duterte, Paolo Duterte, and Sebastian Duterte. Sara Duterte is now serving as the 15th Vice President of Philippines after being elected in May 2022 in tandem with Bongbong Marcos who won the presidency by landslide votes. Prior to becoming the vice president, Sara Duterte was the mayor of Davao City having taken it over for the second time from her father when the latter ran for the presidency in 2016. She previously held the mayorship in 2010 replacing her father who at the time on his third term and likewise served as vice mayor to his father in 2007. Paolo Duterte is the incumbent Davao City 1st District Representative since 2019 and former Deputy Speaker of the House for Political Affairs. He previously served as his father's vice mayor in 2013 and later as her sister's vice mayor in 2018. Sebastian Duterte, who ran unopposed, replaced Paolo as vice mayor in 2019 and replaced Sara as mayor in May 2022 elections. The mayorship of Davao City has been held continuously by the Dutertes since 1988 except for one term in 1998 until 2001 where Rodrigo was succeeded at the end of his third term by his vice mayor Benjamin de Guzman.

=== Estrada ===
The Estrada political family began with Joseph "Erap" Ejercito Estrada, who began as a successful film actor. The popularity Estrada gained from acting proved to be valuable when he pursued a career in politics. He served as the mayor of San Juan from 1969 to 1986, senator from 1987 to 1992, and vice president from 1992 to 1998. He later succeeded Fidel Ramos to be the 13th President of the Philippines. Allegations of corruption under his administration led to an impeachment trial, which was discontinued after the Senate, serving as the impeachment court, voted against opening an envelope possibly containing incriminating evidence. This resulted in the four-day-long Second People Power Revolution. His resignation from presidency was declared soon afterwards and he was later convicted of plunder. Despite this, the absolute pardon given by President Gloria Macapagal-Arroyo allowed Estrada to run unsuccessfully for President in 2010 and eventually be elected mayor of Manila in 2013. Estrada ran and won his second term as mayor in 2016 but lost his bid for the third term in 2019. Estrada retired from politics since then, although he continues to lead his party, Pwersa ng Masang Pilipino. Estrada's wife and First Lady, Loi Estrada, served as senator from 2001 to 2007.

Many other members of the Estrada family are still active in politics, particularly in San Juan. Among these are his sons, Jinggoy Estrada and JV Ejercito, who both served as Mayor of San Juan and Senator. JV's mother and Erap's partner, Guia Guanzon Gomez, was the 18th Mayor of San Juan who served for three terms from 2010 to 2019. Jinggoy is currently facing plunder charges before the Sandiganbayan anti-graft court over his involvement in a multibillion peso pork barrel scam. He was arrested and detained in 2014, and released on bail in 2017. Both Jinggoy Estrada and JV Ejercito ran unsuccessfully for the Senate in 2019, but were elected to the Senate in 2022 winning the 12th and 10th place respectively.

=== Marcos ===
The Marcoses are one of the most well-known political families in the Philippines. The dynasty started with Mariano Marcos, a lawyer from Ilocos Norte who was a member of the House of Representatives in 1925. The Solid North, and particularly Ilocos Norte, remains to be the Marcoses' political stronghold today. Several of the Marcoses currently cannot set foot in any United States territory because of a contempt judgement.

The family was at its peak during the presidency of Ferdinand E. Marcos, son of Mariano Marcos, who ruled from 1965 until 1986. Marcos's family members also held several governmental positions during this period. Though they were exiled as a result of the People Power Revolution, the Marcos family has since regained power and is currently active in Philippine politics. Imelda Marcos, wife of Ferdinand and former first lady, was a governor and assemblywoman of Metro Manila and representative of the first district of Leyte and later, the second district of Ilocos Norte. Marcos’ daughter, Imee Marcos, is an incumbent senator, having been elected in 2019. She was previously the governor of Ilocos Norte. Marcos' only son, Bongbong Marcos, a former senator, governor of Ilocos Norte, and second district representative of Ilocos Norte, ran unsuccessfully for the vice presidency in the 2016 vice presidential race. In the 2022 election, Bongbong Marcos ran in tandem with Sara Duterte. With Duterte family's all out support, he became the 17th President of the Philippines winning the 2022 Philippine Presidential Election. Bongbong Marcos received 31,629,783 votes for president and Sara Duterte received 32,208,417 votes for vice president.

=== Ortega ===
The Ortega political clan is believed to be the Philippines' political family with the longest unbroken political rule, ruling over the province of La Union for over a century. It started with Joaquín Vicente Eulogio Joaquino Ortega, who came to La Union from Cebu to work as a cashier for Compañia General de Tabacos de Filipinas in La Union. He later took part in the revolutionary movement against Spain, in which he represented the province of La Union in the Malolos Congress, a revolutionary congress created during the Philippine Revolution. Three years later, after the Spanish-American War, Joaquín became the first La Union civil governor on August 15, 1901, when he was appointed by the Taft Commission of the United States-backed Insular Government of the Philippine Islands as the first provincial civil governor (2nd governor of La Union), succeeding insurrecto governor Lucino Almeida (1st governor of La Union). In the election held in February 1902, he ran and became the first ever elected governor in La Union, serving until February 1904. After his gubernatorial stint in La Union, Joaquin became the second Abra Civil governor (2nd governor of Abra), serving from 1904 until 1914.

Joaquin's gubernatorial tenure in the Province of La Union marked the start of a centuries-long presence of the Ortega political family in the affairs of this province in various elective positions. The Ortegas have been serving in various elective posts in the Province of La Union for 124 years. For La Union governorship, however, it took 21 succeeding governors from Joaquin Sr. before another Ortega family member was elected governor in the person of Joaquin "Titing" Lacsamana Ortega Jr., one of the 14 children of Joaquin Sr., who served for four years and he was the oldest serving governor at 75 when his term ended. Joaquin Jr. started his political career as Representative to the Philippine Congress from La Union's 1st district from 1969 to 1972 then as Member of the Batasang Pambansa from 1978 until 1986 before he was elected as the 23rd Governor of La Union. After Joaquin Jr. (1988-1992), Justo Ortega Orros Jr. (1992-2001), Victor F. Ortega (2001-2007), Manuel C. Ortega (2007-2016), Francisco Emmanuel "Pacoy" Ramos Ortega III (2016-2022) and Raphaelle "Rafy" Veronica Alviar Ortega-David (2022-2025) were subsequently elected succeedingly and became 24th, 25th, 26th, 27th and 28th Governors of La Union, respectively. Francisco III himself served as congressional representative from June 30, 2007 to June 30, 2016 before becoming governor and was succeeded by his daughter Raphaelle who became the first female governor of La Union when she won the 2022 gubernatorial election. Mario Eduardo Campos Ortega is the incumbent and 29th governor of La Union who assumed his first term of office in June 2025 succeeding his own grandniece Raphaelle, whom he defeated in the 2025 gubernatorial election. Mario was previously the vice governor to both Francisco III and Raphaelle during their respective tenure as governors.

=== Roxas ===
The Roxas political family started with Manuel Acuña Roxas, the fifth president of the Philippines. Before being president, he served as the governor of Capiz. As a descendant of Antonia Róxas y Ureta, he is also related to the Zobel de Ayalas, a prominent business family. His son, Gerardo Roxas, served as a representative of the 1st District of Capiz and senator. His grandson, Gerardo Roxas Jr. served as a representative of the 1st District of Capiz in 1987 until his death in 1993. He was succeeded by his elder brother, Manuel "Mar" Araneta Roxas II, who was elected in 1993 and later became Secretary of Trade and Industry in 2000 under the Estrada administration. Mar Roxas ran successfully as senator in 2004 but was unsuccessful in his bid for the vice presidency in 2010. He was appointed as Secretary of Transportation and Communications in 2011 and Secretary of the Interior and Local Government in 2012 under the administration of President Benigno Aquino III. In 2016, he ran for the presidency, in which he lost to Rodrigo Duterte, ranking second. In 2019, he ran for senator but failed to secure a seat, placing 16th in the elections.

=== Villar ===
The Villar political clan, based in Las Piñas, is one of the richest political dynasties. They are the owners of the real estate company Vista Land and its subsidiary Camella, which have developed former farmlands into subdivisions since 1977. They have a namesake development called Villar City in Cavite, connecting Laguna and the southern parts of Metro Manila.

The dynasty started with Manuel Villar, who ran as a representative of Las Piñas-Muntinlupa's at-large district in 1992 and won a seat. He became a senator and served from 2001 until 2013, when he joined Nacionalista in 2003 and became a chairman. He ran for president in the 2010 presidential election, but lost to Benigno Aquino III. His wife Cynthia Villar ran as Representative of the Lone District of Las Piñas, won in a landslide victory in 2001, and was seated until 2010. She ran for senator in the 2013 Senate election, won a seat replacing her husband, and was re-elected in 2019. She was one of the authors of Republic Act No. 11203 or the Rice Tariffication Law, which reduced the income of farmers.

Their son Mark Villar was the Secretary of Public Works and Highways during the Duterte Administration from 2016 to 2022. He is controversial, because he built the CAVITEX–C-5 Link or the Las Piñas flyover, which affected the right of way of the LRT Line 1 Cavite Extension. He ran for senator in the 2022 Senate election and won a seat.

Their daughter Camille Villar was a member of the House of Representatives for Las Piñas from 2019 to 2025. She ran for the Senate in the 2025 elections, won, and assumed office in June 2025.

The Villar family are one of the top spenders during election campaigns.

=== Ynares ===
The Ynares political clan has one of the longest periods of political rule, ruling over the province of Rizal.

Members of the dynasty have monopolized top political offices in the province, notably the position of governor of Rizal.

The current head of the political clan is Nina Ynares, who has served as governor since 2022, succeeding her mother Rebecca Ynares, who was governor from 2013 to 2022 and earlier from 2001 to 2004. Nina Ynares's father, Casimiro Ynares Jr., was the original head of the clan, and was governor of Rizal from 1992 to 2001 and again from 2004 to 2007.

Lastly, her brother Casimiro Ynares III was governor of Rizal from 2007 to 2013 and subsequently served as mayor of Antipolo from 2013 to 2019 and from 2022 onwards. He also served as public information officer of Antipolo from 2019 to 2022, in the interval between his two terms, while his wife Andrea Bautista-Ynares was mayor.

== See also ==
- Political family
- Hereditary politicians
- Padrino system
