= Hereditary politicians =

Persons having inherited political office

Hereditary politicians refer to politicians (especially modern politicians) whose political position can be seen as being conferred by or based on inheritance from a parent or grandparent in some sense.

== Factors enabling a political office to be passed down ==
=== Name recognition ===
According to Oscar Wilde, "There is only one thing in the world worse than being talked about, and that is not being talked about." This might be especially true for politicians. When the name of a politician is already familiar to the public, then they tend to choose him over someone relatively unknown. This phenomenon is commonly referred to as the Mere-exposure effect in social psychology. This could also be something as superficial as choosing the most familiar-sounding name on the ballot, either because of indecision or ignorance of the candidates' campaign platforms.

In a study done by Vanderbilt University professors, they found that name recognition affects candidate support as they are exposed to subliminal cues. They found evidence that mere exposure to the name of their hypothetical candidate improved perceived viability of the candidate and, in turn, increased their support.

The voting public could also see the parents' previous accomplishment as something that the children can or will also accomplish. For example, before being elected as the President of the Philippines, Benigno (Noynoy) Aquino III was not very popular among the majority of Filipinos and did not have any major contributions as a senator compared to his contemporaries. However, he was propelled into mainstream public consciousness and became a mainstay in news stories when his mother, the first female president Corazon Aquino, suddenly died. With the country in mourning and in the mood to reminisce about the past, which included his father, the assassinated Benigno (Ninoy) Aquino Jr., Noynoy won the presidential election. It was neither because of his charismatic personality nor his achievements as a senator, but because he is the son of the country's two major political figures.

=== Existing political network ===
Having a politician parent almost guarantees a certain degree of success for an individual, as not only does he inherit the valuable name recognition, but also benefits from the social networks and resources that are already established. The political ties that his parent have cultivated in the past will also be of use to the offspring, particularly when it comes to campaigning, forming political parties and fundraising. In Japan, for example, the patronage system is prevalent, especially in the form of "support groups" or koenkai.

=== Authoritarian personalized regime ===
In an authoritarian regime where the public has no real voice when it comes to choosing the state's leader, in many instances the successor may simply be one of the family heirs. This is the case in North Korea, where its first leader, Kim Il Sung, developed a cult of personality and familism as a means of political control. The highest status in the nation has been ascribed to the Kim dynasty, requiring "proper" respect and devotion from its citizens. Various accomplishments, even if irrelevant, are usually ascribed to the Kim family.

== Notable families ==
=== France ===
Le Pen
| Jean-Marie Le Pen | (daughter) Marine Le Pen |
|---|---|
| Member of the European Parliament (1984–2003; from 2004) | Member of the European Parliament (2004–2009; 2009–2017) |
| Regional Councillor of Île-de-France (1986–1992) | Regional Councillor of Île-de-France (2004–2010) |
| Known for: Leader of the National Front (1972–2011) | Known for: Leader of the National Front (from 2011) |

President of the National Front Jean-Marie Le Pen and Councillor Marine Le Pen, who is daughter of the former, followed by Marion Maréchal-Le Pen, Jean-Marie Le Pen's granddaughter. Also, Le Pen's parent and child have served as the leader of the same party over two generations.

=== India ===
Nehru-Gandhi
| Jawaharlal Nehru | (daughter) Indira Gandhi | (grandson) Rajiv Gandhi |
|---|---|---|
| 1st Prime Minister (1947–1964) | 3rd Prime Minister (1966–1977, 1980–1984) | 6th Prime Minister (1984–1989) |
| Known for: Indian independence movement The President of the Indian National Congress Member of the Constituent Assembly of India Oversaw the partition of India Liaquat–Nehru Pact Indo-Pakistani War of 1947–1948 Non-Alignment Movement State Reorganisation Commission Panchsheel policy Sino-Indian War | Known for: Bangladesh Liberation War Indo-Pakistani War of 1971 Imposing the emergency Operation Blue Star | Known for: Oversaw 1984 anti-Sikh riots Indian intervention in the Sri Lankan Civil War Reverting the Supreme Court's verdict on Shah Bano case in the Parliament of India Bofors scam |

President of the Indian National Congress Motilal Nehru and the first Prime Minister of India, Jawaharlal Nehru, who is the son of the former, followed by Indira Gandhi, Rajiv Gandhi, Sonia Gandhi, who is married to the former and their son Rahul Gandhi, have all served as the leader of the same party over five generations. Hereditary succession of chief ministership in India is quite common across the spectrum, with prominent examples the Yadav family of Samajwadi Party, the Abdullah family of Jammu & Kashmir National Conference, H.D. Deve Gowda’s family in Janata Dal (Secular), the Sangmas of National People's Party and the Karunanidhi family of the Dravida Munnetra Kazhagam.

=== Indonesia ===
| Sukarno | (daughter) Megawati Sukarnoputri |
|---|---|
| 1st President (1945–1967) | 5th President (2001–2004) |
| Known for: Proclamator of Indonesian Independence Indonesian National Revolution 1959 Presidential Decree Oversaw Operation Trikora (1961–1962) Oversaw Indonesia–Malaysia confrontation (1963–1966) | Known for: One of the initiators of Reformasi State-owned enterprise privatizations Oversaw the 2003–2004 Indonesian offensive in Aceh |

=== Iran ===
Khamenei
| Ali Khamenei علی خامنه‌ای | (son) Mojtaba Khamenei مجتبی خامنه‌ای |
|---|---|
| 2nd Supreme Leader (1989–2026) | 3rd Supreme Leader (since 2026) |
| Known for: His fatwa against nuclear weapons Multiple protests against his regime, including the 2009 Iranian presidential election protests, 2011–2012 Iranian protests, 2017–2018 Iranian protests, Mahsa Amini protests and especially the 2025–2026 Iranian protests, which led to the 2026 Iran massacres His assassination | Known for: His pro-nuclear weapons policy, opposed to his father's fatwa |

=== Japan ===
Hereditary politics is prevalent in Japan because political families hold on to three-bans, jiban, kanban, and kaban (financial support), which are three essential resources for a candidate to win an election. Jiban is the personal support from the people in a district. Kanban literally translates into an advertisement board, which symbolizes fame. Lastly, kaban means "bag" in Japanese and this refers to the financial support to run an election.

A hereditary politician is considered a structural feature of Japanese politics. It is reported that approximately 30 percent of the House of Representatives are Nisei, who are the second generation of the Diet members. The Nisei population takes up to 40 percent of the Liberal Democratic Party (LDP). Furthermore, most Japanese Prime Ministers have a strong political background. Famous examples are Junichiro Koizumi, Yasuo Fukuda, and Shinzo Abe, Tarō Asō.

Sato-Kishi-Abe
| (Maternal grandfather) Nobusuke Kishi 岸 信介 | (Maternal granduncle) Eisaku Sato 佐藤 栄作 | (Paternal grandfather) Kan Abe 安倍 寛 | (Father) Shintaro Abe 安倍 晋太郎 | Shinzo Abe 安倍 晋三 |
|---|---|---|---|---|
| 37th Prime Minister (1957–1960) | 39th Prime Minister (1964-1972) | – | – | 57th and 63rd Prime Minister (2006–2007, 2012–2020) |
| Member of the House of Representatives (1942–1943, 1953–1979) | Member of the House of Representatives (1937–1946) | Member of the House of Representatives (1949–1975) | Member of the House of Representatives (1958–1963, 1967–1991) | Member of the House of Representatives (1993–2022) |
| Known for: Manchukuo labor scandal Used Yakuza protection during Sukarno's state visit 1955 System Anpo protests | – | Known for: Attempt to oust Hideki Tojo to end WWII | – | Known for: Push for Revision of Article 9 of Constitution Abenomics Veterinary school scandal Comfort women remark Initiated Quadrilateral Security Dialogue |

Nobusuke Kishi was criticized for the Manchukuo labor scandal which he had exploited Chinese workers in order to channel profits for Japan. His life was described as mirroring the US-JP relationship before and after the war: from enemy to allies. Mr. Nobusuke was condemned as a war criminal by the Americans, but later, he became the main negotiator for a peaceful relationship with the US. Therefore, he was referred to as America's Favorite War Criminal.

Kan Abe served in the House of Representatives from 1937 to 1946. He is famous for running the opposing platform to oppose to the militaristic government, which was under Hideki Tojo’s control.

Shinzo continued his grandfather's proposal of amending the current Japanese Constitution, which restricts Japan's use of military forces. Even though this topic is very controversial within society, Shinzo has always been assertive about the revision. He is also famous for his economic reforms known as Abenomics. He had been involved in several scandals, such as the veterinary school scandal, which greatly decreased his approval poll rating. However, his strong attitude towards the North Korea crisis had helped his party win the majority of seats in the 2017 Japanese general election.

Fukuda
| Takeo Fukuda 福田 赳夫 | (son) Yasuo Fukuda 福田 康夫 |
|---|---|
| 42nd Prime Minister (1976–1978) | 58th Prime Minister (2007–2008) |
| Known for: Fukuda Doctrine Response to JAL Flight 472 hijacking Introduction of primary elections within a political party | Associated with: Pension system scandal Sudden resignation Diplomacy with China |

Fukuda Takeo's response to the terrorist hijacking incident, Japan Airlines Flight 472 (1977), drew international controversies. Unlike how Western countries would refuse hijackers’ demands, Fukuda accepted their demands based on the principle that "human life outweighs the earth."

Fukuda Yasuo, the eldest son of Fukuda Takeo, became the Prime Minister after Shinzo Abe's abrupt resignation. Less than one year in office, Mr. Fukuda had to step down from his position due to ongoing involvement in political scandals such as the missing pension scandal, which caused a steep decrease in his personal popularity.

Yoshida
| Shigeru Yoshida 吉田茂 | (grandson) Tarō Asō 麻生太郎 |
|---|---|
| 32th Prime Minister (1946–1954) | 59th Prime Minister (2008–2009) |
| Associated with: Japanese Prime Minister in the post-war period. Treaty of San Francisco Yoshida Doctrine | Known for: Post-premiership and party kingmaker Deputy Prime Minister Japan longest in history |

Shigeru Yoshida was the first Prime Minister of Japan in the post-war period and is considered the chief architect of modern Japan. As a founding father of modern Japan, He was the first Prime Minister of Japan's Liberal Democratic Party and the longest-serving Prime Minister in Japanese history.

Tarō Asō is the grandson of the late Prime Minister Yoshida, a seasoned Japanese politician who often operates behind the scenes and is also the longest-serving Deputy Prime Minister in Japanese history, he is considered a godfather within the party and known for his rebellious style.

Hatoyama
| Ichiro Hatoyama 鳩山 一郎 | (grandson) Yukio Hatoyama 鳩山 由紀夫 |
|---|---|
| 36th Prime Minister (1954–1956) | 60th Prime Minister (2009–2010) |
| Associated with: Rebuilt diplomatic ties with the Soviet Union Assassination plot First president of the LDP | Known for: Campaign donation scandal American military base in Okinawa issue |

Hatoyama Ichirō was elected as the first Liberal Democratic Party (Japan) President during the 1956 party convention. One of his famous diplomatic goal was to restore the relationship with the Soviet Union. As a post war Prime Minister, his central proposal was to strengthen national political and economic independence. Hatoyama gained high popularity and helped the party win 185 seats in the election. This was later referred to as the "Hatoyama boom."

Hatoyama Yukio, like his grandfather, had entered his career as a Prime Minister with high popularity. His public approval rating fell rapidly as he could not fulfil the high expectations his party had promised. One significant example is the broken promise to relocate the American Military base in Okinawa. This incident was the main reason why Mr. Hatoyama resigned from the Prime Minister position within less than a year after he was elected.

=== North Korea ===
Kim
| Kim Il Sung 김일성/金日成 | (son) Kim Jong Il 김정일/金正日 | (grandson) Kim Jong Un 김정은/金正恩 |
|---|---|---|
| Chairman of the Workers' Party of Korea (1949–1966) | General Secretary of the Workers' Party of Korea (1997–2011) | First Secretary of the Workers' Party of Korea (2012–2016) |
| General Secretary of the Workers' Party of Korea (1966–1994) | | Chairman of the Workers' Party of Korea (2016–2021) |
| President of the Democratic People's Republic of Korea (1972–1994) | | General Secretary of the Workers' Party of Korea (from 2021) |
| Known for: Authorized the invasion of South Korea Created the Juche Policy | Known for: Military-first policy | Known for: Nuclear weapon testing North Korea–United States Summit Byungjin policy |

=== Philippines ===
Political families started becoming more apparent in the national political scene after World War II and gradually turned into hereditary politics, especially in the provinces. In 1946, Vicente Sotto became a senator after his brother Filemon Sotto previously held a position in the Senate before the war. The 60s saw more frequent instances of relatives getting elected in the Senate such as the election of the brother of then President Ramon Magsaysay; of Magnolia Antonino as Senator after her husband Senator Gaudencio died; of Sergio Osmeña Jr. who was the son of 4th President Sergio Osmeña Sr.; of Gerardo Roxas who was another son of a previous president; and of Benigno Aquino Jr. who was the son of Benigno Sr. During the martial law years, it only became worse as Marcos named his wife Imelda as the governor of Metro Manila while his son Bongbong became the governor of Ilocos Norte.

In 2014, talks about an anti-political dynasty bill surfaced, but it was not received favorably by the public as it was seen as a watered-down version that would not eliminate the monopoly of the elites on the political scene.

Aquino
| Benigno Aquino Sr. | (son) Benigno Aquino Jr. | (daughter-in-law) Corazon Aquino | (grandson) Benigno Aquino III |
|---|---|---|---|
| Senator (1928–1934) | Governor of Tarlac (1961–1967) | 11th President (1986–1992) | Representative of the 2nd District of Tarlac (1998–2007) |
| Representative of the 2nd District of Tarlac (1935–1938, 1945–1946) | Governor of Tarlac (1961–1967) | 11th President (1986–1992) | Senator (2007–2010) |
| Representative of the At-large District of Tarlac (1943–1944) | Senator (1967–1972) | 11th President (1986–1992) | 15th President (2010–2016) |
| Known for : Collaboration with the Japanese during the occupation. | Known for : Opposition to Ferdinand Marcos Died by assassination | Known for : 11th President of the Philippines Aquinoism Hacienda Luisita People Power Revolution 1987 Constitution Agrarian reform Mendiola Massacre | Known for : 15th President of the Philippines Response to Manila hostage crisis Wang-wang policy Chief Justice impeachment trial 2015 Lumad massacre Mamasapano clash NAIA Bullet planting scandal Approved the sale of Dengvaxia, the first country in Asia to do so. |

Corazon Aquino was the wife of former Senator Benigno "Ninoy" Aquino who was assassinated during Martial Law, sparking the celebrated People Power Revolution. Cory, as she was fondly referred to, was then elected as the first female president of the Philippines and oversaw the creation of the 1987 Constitution. She was named 1987 Woman of the Year by Time Magazine and served for one term in office before being succeeded by Fidel Ramos. In 2008, she was diagnosed with cancer and died one year after. Cory's funeral procession took over 8 hours as thousands of Filipinos took to the streets to pay their last respects, a proof of her popularity among the public.

Coincidentally, the year she died was the year when political parties started floating names for their presidential candidates. Since Cory Aquino's legacy was still fresh in the public's mind, the Liberal Party took advantage of the resurgence of Aquino's popularity and named her son Noynoy Aquino as their presidential candidate in place of Mar Roxas, the previously announced standard-bearer of the party. Noynoy Aquino eventually won the 2010 presidential elections.

Duterte
| Rodrigo Duterte | (daughter) Sara Duterte | (son) Paolo Duterte | (son) Sebastian Duterte |
|---|---|---|---|
| Mayor of Davao City (1988–1998, 2001–2010, 2013–2016) | Vice Mayor of Davao City (2007–2010) | Vice Mayor of Davao City (2013–2018) | Vice Mayor of Davao City (2019–2022) |
| Vice Mayor of Davao City (1986–1987, 2010–2013) | Mayor of Davao City (2010–2013, 2016–2022) | Representative of the 1st District of Davao City (2019–present) | Mayor of Davao City (2022–present) |
| Representative of the 1st District of Davao City (1998–2001) | Mayor of Davao City (2010–2013, 2016–2022) | Representative of the 1st District of Davao City (2019–present) | Mayor of Davao City (2022–present) |
| 16th President (2016–2022) | 15th Vice President (2022–present) | Representative of the 1st District of Davao City (2019–present) | Mayor of Davao City (2022–present) |
| Known for: 16th President of the Philippines Dutertismo Davao Death Squad War on drugs Ostensible pursuit of an "independent foreign policy" by playing China, Russia and the US against each other through the cultivation of improved ties with the former two 2018 Boracay closure and redevelopment Canada–Philippines waste dispute Launch of 9-1-1 and 8888 Executive Order No. 26 Build! Build! Build! infrastructure plan Arrest of Rodrigo Duterte | Known for: 15th Vice President of the Philippines Marcos–Duterte rift Impeachment cases (first; second) | Known for: Davao Death Squad Suspicion of ties to Chinese Triad | Known for: |

Rodrigo Duterte started serving as mayor of Davao City in 1988, winning consecutive terms until 1998. He is known for his strict implementation of law and order policies and became well known for his apparent success in lowering the crime rate of Davao. Digong, as he is known by his constituents, issued orders regarding alcohol consumption, prostitution, smoking and firecrackers. However, he has long been suspected of being the mastermind behind the infamous vigilante group Davao Death Squad which arbitrarily kills suspected criminals. As the current president of the Philippines, Rodrigo has been under fire for his war on drugs campaign, which reportedly leads to extrajudicial killings.

During Rodrigo's 2007–2010 term, his daughter Sara Duterte was elected as the vice mayor. In the succeeding term of 2010–2013, they switched offices: Sara was the one who was elected mayor, while her father was elected as the vice mayor. In the next term of 2013–2016, Rodrigo was elected mayor again, but this time, his vice mayor was his son Paolo Duterte.

Ejercito Estrada
| Joseph Estrada | (son) Jinggoy Estrada |
|---|---|
| Mayor of San Juan (1969–1986) | Mayor of San Juan (1992–2001) |
| Senator (1987–1992) | Senator (2004–2016, 2022–present) |
| 9th Vice President (1992–1998) | Senator (2004–2016, 2022–present) |
| 13th President (1998–2001) | Senator (2004–2016, 2022–present) |
| Mayor of Manila (2013–2019) | Senator (2004–2016, 2022–present) |
| Known for : 13th President of the Philippines Film acting Jueteng scandal Impeachment trial People Power II Incarcerated for plunder | Known for : Film acting Hong Kong airport incident Incarcerated for plunder |

Joseph Estrada, commonly known as "Erap", became famous as a film actor from 1956 to 1989, starring in hundreds of movies and even founding the celebrated annual Metro Manila Film Festival. His popularity as an actor obviously served him well in his venture in politics, starting in 1969 when he was elected mayor of San Juan and eventually rising to the highest office in the nation as the 13th President of the Philippines in 1998. Erap assumed office during the Asian Financial Crisis, and his administration was marred by various controversies. His term in office was consequently cut short when he was accused of graft and corruption and underwent an impeachment trial in 2001. However, before the trial was even concluded, he was ousted from office by the Second People Power Revolution. He was charged with plunder and was found guilty with a sentence of lifetime imprisonment, making him the first Philippine president to be impeached and convicted.

In 2007, after 6 years of being detained, Erap was pardoned by President Gloria Macapagal Arroyo. He was granted executive clemency in exchange for a commitment that he will no longer seek public office. However, Erap ran again as a presidential candidate during the 2010 election with Jejomar Binay as his vice president, but lost to Noynoy Aquino.

Meanwhile, his son Jinggoy followed in his footsteps as he was elected mayor of San Juan in 1992 when he was 29 years old, which made him the youngest elected mayor in the country. Jinggoy stayed in office until 2001, the year when his father was ousted as president. Then, in 2004, he was elected as a senator and rose to the position of Senate president pro tempore after 3 years. Unfortunately, Jinggoy was also charged with plunder when the PDAF Scam involving Janet Lim-Napoles was exposed in 2013. He was released in September 2017 after posting Php 1.33 million in bail.

Macapagal-Arroyo
| Diosdado Macapagal | (daughter) Gloria Macapagal Arroyo |
|---|---|
| Representative of the 1st District of Pampanga (1949–1957) | Senator (1992–1998) |
| The 5th Vice President (1957–1961) | The 10th Vice President (1998–2001) |
| The 9th President (1961–1965) | The 14th President (2001–2010) |
| The 9th President (1961–1965) | Representative of the 2nd District of Pampanga (2010–2019, 2022–present) |
| Known for : The 9th President of the Philippines Changed Independence Day from July 4 to June 12 Anti-corruption campaign | Known for : The 15th President of the Philippines People Power II Hello Garci scandal Oakwood Mutiny Impeachment case (graft and corruption) |

Diosdado Macapagal was the 9th Philippine President whose administration worked to prevent corruption. His reforms were however, impeded by Congress, which was then led by politicians from the Nacionalista Party, a rival of the Liberal Party, where Diosdado belonged. Diosdado was also known for changing the date for the celebration of Philippine Independence – from July 4 to June 12.

In an interview with Time before Estrada was ousted from office in 2001, Gloria said: "I will follow my father's footsteps in doing what is right, and God will take care of the rest. My father is my role model." Ironically, when Gloria was elected as the 14th Philippine President, her administration was marred by scandals, accusations of corruption and electoral fraud.

Gloria's rise to the presidency came about because of the Second People Power Revolution, where then-President Estrada was ousted. Being the Vice President, Gloria was sworn in as the new president. She then ran during the 2004 presidential election and won with just over 3% margin – the closest in a Philippine presidential election. Her slim margin of victory over a popular actor-candidate, Fernando Poe Jr., gave rise to suspicions of cheating. It came to a head when audio recordings of then Election Commissioner Virgilio Garcillano and Gloria were released in 2005 despite government threats. The audio recording was of a phone call where Gloria allegedly gave Garcillano instructions to rig the elections in her favor. In what became known as the Hello Garci scandal, Gloria gave a televised address where she denied accusations of cheating but admitted that it was her voice on the audio recording, prompting protests and calls for impeachment.

Marcos
| Ferdinand Marcos | (son) Bongbong Marcos | (daughter) Imee Marcos |
|---|---|---|
| Member of the House of Representatives from Ilocos Norte 2nd District (1949–1959) | Governor of Ilocos Norte (1983–1986, 1998–2007) | Member of the House of Representatives from Ilocos Norte 2nd District (1998–2007) |
| Senator (1959–1965) | Member of the House of Representatives from Ilocos Norte 2nd District (1992–1995, 2007–2010) Senator (2010–2016) | Governor of Ilocos Norte (2010–2019) |
| 10th President (1965–1986) | 17th President (2022–present) | Senator (2019–present) |
| Known for : 10th President of the Philippines Martial Law (1972–1985) Economic reforms Conjugal dictatorship Human rights abuses Corruption Aquino assassination People Power Revolution | Known for : Clone urban legend Embezzlement of Public Funds Non-payment of Taxes Convicted of failure to file income tax returns (1982 to 1985) Heir of dictatorship and corruption Fake News | Known for : Inciting the murder of Archimedes Trajano |

Ferdinand Marcos was infamous for placing the country under martial law from 1972 to 1981 and suppressing civil liberties during his time in office as the 10th President of the Philippines. However, his rise to power began when he was elected Representative of his hometown, Ilocos Norte, from 1949 to 1959. Shortly thereafter, he moved on to become a Senator from 1959 to 1965. This path was closely followed by his son Bongbong as the latter was also elected, first as Representative of Ilocos Norte for two terms, and then as Senator from 2010 to 2016. Meanwhile, his daughter Imee, who also got elected as Representative of Ilocos Norte from 1998 to 2007, did not go on to become a Senator but was instead elected as the provincial governor in 2010.

Whereas Ferdinand got elected as the President in 1965 – defeating incumbent Diosdado Macapagal – and holding the office for a total of 21 years, his son Bongbong did not run for the presidency. Instead, he ran as a vice-presidential candidate under the Nacionalista Party during the 2016 presidential elections, where he lost by merely 263,473 votes to Leni Robredo.

=== Singapore ===
Lee
| Lee Kuan Yew 李光耀 | (son) Lee Hsien Loong 李显龙 |
|---|---|
| 1st Prime Minister (1959–1990) | 3rd Prime Minister (2004–2024) |
| Known for: Founding father of Singapore Transforming Singapore from "third world to first world in a single generation" | Known for: Oversaw rescue operations of the Singapore Cable Car disaster Amendments to Singapore citizenship requirements Lee Kuan Yew's house dispute |

Lee Kuan Yew was famous for founding the country of Singapore in 1965 after it was expelled from Malaysia following racial strife and economic disagreements with other states. He assumed leadership of the newly created government of Singapore after its independence, though he sadly expressed in a speech his desire to have been united with Malaysia. Kuan Yew was credited with the rise of Singapore as a developed country and was deemed a great statesman as he led the country for 31 years. His legacy included reducing the unemployment rate, increasing the GNP and increasing literacy rates. He remained influential even after retirement.

Kuan Yew reportedly did not want a cult of personality to develop in the country, so he willed that his house in 38 Oxley Road be demolished after he died. However, his son Hsien Loong got into a publicised dispute with his siblings regarding their father's house. Accused by his siblings of abusing his powers by preserving their father's house, Hsien Loong decided to deliver a speech to refute them.

=== South Korea ===
Park
| Park Chung Hee 박정희/朴正熙 | (daughter) Park Geun-hye 박근혜/朴槿惠 |
|---|---|
| 3rd President (1963–1979) | 11th President (2013–2017) |
| Known for: Assassinated by the KCIA director Significant contribution to South Korea's economic growth: Miracle on the Han River | Known for: Corruption scandal Impeachment trial |

Park Chung Hee served as the third president of South Korea from 1963 until he was assassinated in 1979 by the then-director of the Korean Central Intelligence Agency (KCIA). Park had been a controversial political figure in Korea; During his presidency, he had sustained the rapid economic growth in South Korea, which people often refer to as the Miracle on the Han River. On the other hand, he had been an authoritarian dictator who oppressed opposition parties and civil liberties.

In 2013, Park's daughter, Park Geun-hye, became the first female president of South Korea. Older Koreans who hold nostalgia toward the presidency of Park Geun-hye's father highly contributed to her success in the 2012 presidential election. Unlike her father's 18 years of authoritarian rule, Park Geun-hye ended her term in office in 2017 after a major influence and bribery scandal was exposed.

=== Taiwan ===
During the 2016 legislative election, among 365 candidates, 63 of them came from a political family. Furthermore, among those who came from a political family, 40 of them were children of a former politician. Within the 22 cities and counties in Taiwan, the percentage of politicians a political background is 24.6%.

After the 2014 Sunflower Student Movement, there are rising voices from the people for a political landscape change. This came along with the public favoring younger forces into the political arena. Thus, both the KMT and the Democratic Progressive Party attempt to refresh their party by recruiting new members. However, it is not easy for them to appeal to younger people to join politics; therefore, parties look inwards for the second generation.

Chiang
| Chiang Kai-shek 蔣中正 | (son) Chiang Ching-kuo 蔣經國 |
|---|---|
| Premier (1930–1931, 1935–1938, 1939–1945, 1947) | Premier (1972–1978) |
| President (1948–1949, 1950–1975) | President (1978–1988) |
| Known for: Martial Law White Terror | Known for: Ten Major Construction Projects Three Noes |

The Chiang family is the most prominent political family in Taiwan. Their historical meaning to Taiwan is very controversial as they helped thrive the Taiwanese economy but at the same time were highly oppressive toward civil liberty. The Martial law in Taiwan was enacted in 1948 and lasted till 1987 when Chiang Ching-kuo finally called an end to it. Taiwan had been under the restriction of Martial law for more than 38 years, making it the world's second-longest Martial law. During this period of time, many innocent people were accused of being spies from the Chinese Communist. Many intellectuals were restricted or even killed. To avoid being mistaken as spies from China, people were careful not to talk about taboo topics such as the White Terror and the February 28 Incident.

Taiwan's economic miracle was highly contributed to Chiang Ching-kuo's (at that time the President of Taiwan) policy, the Ten Major Construction Projects, a government-introduced economic development plan. These ten massive building projects improved basic infrastructures and upgraded the Taiwanese industry, which later on played an important role in the Taiwan Miracle).

The Three-noes Policy was the diplomatic relationship with China during President Chiang Ching-kuo. These three noes include: no contact, no compromises and no negotiation with the Chinese Communists.

== Criticisms ==
One of the biggest harms of hereditary politicians is corruption or bribery, a phenomenon that is especially common in countries like the Philippines, where its political power and economic interests are highly intertwined. The concentration of political power "perpetuates a culture of dependency between an economically/politically dominant patron," which often leads to corruption and bribery.

Moreover, hereditary political families tend to pass down their ideology and previous accomplishments from one generation to the next. This suggests that the new generation is likely to be trapped by their family preoccupations. For instance, the Prime Minister of Japan, Shinzō Abe, has been eagerly pushing the revision of the Constitution of Japan, a policy which he inherited from his grandfather. Many regard Abe's assertive attitude to revise the Constitution as his political weakness. Also, political families tend to have strong dependency on specific interest groups within the society. In order to maintain the relationship, it becomes difficult for politicians to make reforms which may challenge the interests of their support groups.

There is also the so-called Carnegie effect, which describes the effect of how inherited fame and political network may decrease one's incentive to work hard. Most hereditary politicians were able to get a political position with relatively less effort compared to those who had no political background. Inherited advantages impede one's ambition to enrich oneself. For instance, hereditary candidates have inherited political connections from their predecessors; therefore, they do not need to work hard for bureaucratic or academic competence in order to gain their position.

== Difference from a political dynasty ==
Hereditary politics is characterized by a son/daughter or grandson/granddaughter gaining an office that was once held by their parent (or grandparent). In comparison, a political dynasty is different from hereditary politicians as the former is characterized by either of the following: 1) Members of the same family (simultaneously) holding the same government positions but in different districts; or 2) Members of the same family (simultaneously or successively) holding various government positions.

Philippines

Ampatuan
| Andal Ampatuan Sr. | (son) Andal Ampatuan Jr. | (son) Zaldy Ampatuan |
|---|---|---|
| Governor of Maguindanao (2001–2008) | Mayor of Datu Unsay, Maguindanao (--) | 6th Governor of the Autonomous Region in Muslim Mindanao (2005–2009) |

An example of political dynasty which might look similar to hereditary politics is the Ampatuan family in the Philippines. A prominent political family in Maguindanao, a former province in the southern Philippines, the Ampatuans exercised great power in the region. Its patriarch, Andal Sr., was elected as governor from 2001 to 2008. During the 2007 general elections, he ran unopposed. Meanwhile, his son Zaldy Ampatuan was in office as governor of the ARMM, an administrative region where Maguindanao belongs, from 2005 to 2009.

Another of Andal's sons, former mayor of Datu Unsay Andal Jr., was supposed to run as governor of Maguindanao during the 2010 general elections. However, the whole Ampatuan family came under fire after their political rival Esmael Mangudadatu was ambushed along with over 50 people that included journalists, lawyers, relatives and civilians who happened to be in the same place. Mangudadatu and his convoy were about to file his certificate of candidacy to run against Ampatuan for the gubernatorial office when they were reportedly attacked by 100 armed men. An estimated 58 individuals were killed during the incident, including 32 journalists. Dubbed as the "single deadliest event for the press" since the CPJ started keeping records, this incident prevented the younger Ampatuan from running for office and resulted in his incarceration.

China

Xi
| Xi Zhongxun 习仲勋 | (son) Xi Jinping 习近平 |
|---|---|
| Head of the CCP Propaganda Department (1953–1954) | General Secretary of the Chinese Communist Party (from 2012) |
| Vice Premier and Secretary-General of the State Council (1954–1965) | Chairman of the Central Military Commission (from 2012) |
| Vice Chairperson of the Standing Committee of the National People's Congress (1980–1993) | 7th President of China (from 2013) |
| Known for: First generation of Chinese leadership Eight Elders | Known for: Xi Jinping Thought Chinese Dream Anti-corruption campaign |

The current General Secretary of the Chinese Communist Party, Xi Jinping, is both a member of the Princeling and the second Red Generation. Xi's father, Xi Zhongxun, was considered the first generation of Chinese leadership, for which he served as the vice premier. Xi's rise in political power was said to be supported by the princelings and the second red generation faction. However, unexpectedly, Xi had been reported to distance himself from those factions by expanding "commoners" within his new political team. There are only two people (Xi and Zhang Youxia) who are descendants of the second-generation red among the 25 members of the CCP Politburo.

Former Chinese Premier Li Keqiang was once deemed the most potential successor of former CCP General Secretary Hu Jintao. However, Li did not succeed because he did not have a deeply-rooted political family background. On the other hand, Xi Jinping became the successor of Mr. Hu with the support of a strong political network, which he inherited from his father, Xi Zhongxun, who had been a senior political leader for more than 50 years.

The history of China’s aristocratic class can be traced back to the period when China was under the control of Mao Zedong. Mao's army received a lot of aid from the south; one significant example was the southern general, Ye Jianying. During the conflict between Zhang's Fourth Front Army and Mao's First Front Army, Ye warned Mao in advance that Zhang Guotao was planning to overthrow Mao. Later on, during the Long March, Ye came to aid Mao by assisting Liu Bocheng in directing the crossing of the Yangtze River without losing a man. Mao highly appreciated his contributions to the Chinese Communist Party. In return for Ye's contributions, Mao protected Ye during the Cultural Revolution and gave him a lot of political power. Ye was said to have 'paved the way for the country's move to a more market-oriented economy and created a political dynasty that still plays kingmaker'. Ye was described as having the ability to 'influence national policy and protect its sprawling business empire in southern China.’ Ye Jianying's political influence continued even after his death as his children had high influences on Chinese politics. One concrete example was when his children attempted to help block a vocal advocate of economic change from joining the CCP Politburo Standing Committee because it was not attentive to their interests.’

Vietnam

Tô
| Tô Lâm | (son) Tô Long |
|---|---|
| President and General Secretary of the Communist Party of Vietnam (from 2026) | (from 2025) |
| Minister of Public Security of Vietnam (2016–2024) | (from 2025) |
| Known for: Gold steak controversy Streamlining the Vietnamese government apparatus. | Known for: son of Tô Lâm |

The current President and General Secretary of the Communist Party of Vietnam, Tô Lâm, He is the son of the Colonel Tô Quyền.

Following the death of the then-General Secretary of the Communist Party of Vietnam, Nguyễn Phú Trọng. Lâm Acting as interim holder of this position from July 18 to August 3, 2024.

On August 3, 2024, Lâm took the oath of office as General Secretary of the Communist Party of Vietnam.

During the same period, he also briefly served as President of the Socialist Republic of Vietnam until 2024.

In 2026, during the 16th National Congress of the Communist Party of Vietnam, Lâm returned to his position as President of the Republic and concurrently as General Secretary of the Communist Party of Vietnam.

In Vietnam, there are also several other prominent families with hereditary political careers.

To Long, son of To Lam born in 1982, currently serving in the Vietnamese police force.

The current Prime Minister of Vietnam, Le Minh Hung, has a father named Le Minh Huong He was the former Minister of Public Security from 1996 to 2002.

Former Prime Minister of Vietnam Nguyen Tan Dung He served as Prime Minister from 2006 to 2016, He has two sons who are Vietnamese politicians: Nguyen Thanh Nghi and Nguyen Minh Triet.

The former President of Vietnam, Tran Duc Luong, served as President from 1997 to 2006 He has a son who is a politician, Tran Tuan Anh.

== See also ==
- Hereditary monarchy
- Political dynasties in the Philippines
- Political family
- Nepotism
- Widow's succession
- Kleptocracy
