= Sajid Ampatuan =

Filipino politician who served as the government of Maguindanao

Datu Sajid Ampatuan

Vice Mayor of Shariff Saydona Mustapha
- Incumbent
- Assumed office June 30, 2022
- Preceded by: Bai Zandria Ampatuan

Mayor of Shariff Saydona Mustapha
- In office June 30, 2019 – June 30, 2022
- Succeeded by: Sajid Andre Ampatuan

7th Governor of Maguindanao
- In office 2008 – November 2009
- Preceded by: Andal Ampatuan Sr.
- Succeeded by: Bai Nariman Ambolodto (acting)

Vice Governor of Maguindanao
- In office June 30, 2004 – 2008
- Governor: Andal Ampatuan Sr.

Personal details
- Party: Nacionalista (2018–present)
- Other political affiliations: United Nationalist Alliance (2015–2018); Independent (2009–2015); Lakas–Kampi–CMD (until 2009)
- Spouse: Zandria Sinsuat
- Parent: Andal Ampatuan Sr. (father)

Datu Sajid Islam Uy Ampatuan is a Filipino politician who served as governor of Maguindanao.

== Career ==
Sajid Ampatuan was elected as vice governor of Maguindanao in the 2004 elections while his father Andal Ampatuan Sr. was elected as governor of the province. Ampatuan Sr. resigned in 2008 with Sajid succeeding him. Sajid Ampatuan himself vacated the office following the Maguindanao massacre in November 2009 in the municipality of Ampatuan. He and his brothers Zaldy, Anwar and Andal Jr., and brother-in-law Akmad were implicated to the massacre and were detained. He was released on bail in March 2015 and acquitted in 2019.

Tasked by his father to lead the "reunification" of the Ampatuan political clan, Sajid Ampatuan would run for the position of mayor of Shariff Aguak in the 2016 elections under the United Nationalist Alliance. He lost his mayoral bid.

He was elected as vice mayor of Shariff Saydona Mustapha in the 2022 elections. He ran under the Nacionalista Party.

=== Controversies ===
In 2017, several corruption charges were filed against Ampatuan which is connected to his tenure as acting governor of Maguindanao from 2008 to 2009.

Since March 2019, he has been convicted by the Sandiganbayan at least seven times.

- March 2019: Acting on the 75 corruption cases against provincial officials, filed by the Ombudsman in 2017 in connection with the supposed purchase of construction materials in 2009 to repair school buildings in the province. He was convicted of 63 counts of falsification of public documents, but acquitted of 10 counts; and with former provincial engineer Datu Ali Abpi, were convicted of a count each of graft and of malversation. His total prison sentence ranged at 79–556 years; the two were also perpetually disqualified from holding public office. The conviction was affirmed in September.
- October 2022: He was sentenced to 128–170 years of imprisonment for charges of graft and malversation of public funds through falsification of public documents. He and former provincial budget officer Abpi were involved in the supposed procurement of food supplies in 2009 even though no such purchases were made. Both accused were sentenced to 6–8 years imprisonment for each of 4 counts of graft. They were then sentenced to reclusión perpetua for each of 3 counts of malversation of public funds, and perpetually disqualified to hold public office; while 14–18 years for the fourth count. Abpi was also convicted of another count of graft and malversation.
- January 2023: In connection with several "ghost" road rehabilitation projects; eight counts each of graft and falsification of public documents, with a prison sentence of 64–112 years in total. He was also ordered arrested for his failure to attend on the promulgation of the decision. Five engineers were convicted of falsification charges as well.
- February 2023: In connection to the "ghost" procurement of construction materials in 2009; the Ombudsman in 2017 filed 144 cases against him and Abpi, including falsification of public documents (136 counts), graft and malversation of public funds (4 counts each). He was convicted of 126 counts of falsification and all of other charges and was sentenced to 848–994 years in total. The latter, despite had reportedly died, was convicted of all charges and given a longer prison sentence. In April, the court, declaring the decision as final and executory, barred him from filing an appeal after his failure to appear in court during promulgation and to surrender in person.
- March 2023: He was sentenced to reclusión perpetua for malversation of public funds and another 8–12 years for graft, over fake purchases of farm supplies in 2009.
- May 2023: In connection with "ghost" purchases of emergency food supplies to a non-existent supplier in 2009. He and Abpi were sentenced to 6–10 years for graft and 10–18 years for malversation; while were acquitted in 34 counts of falsification. The cases against two co-defendants (also involved in three earlier cases) are archived since they were not arraigned; two others (among the three involved in two) had died. All living accused remain at large.
- October 2024: Involving the public funds allocated to farm-to-market roads in Maguindanao which were unimplemented. He was given a prison sentence of up to 12 years for graft; and penalties of reclusión perpetua and perpetual disqualification to hold any public office for malversation of public funds.

== Personal life ==
Ampatuan is married to Bai Zandria Sinsuat, who served as mayor of Shariff Saydona Mustapha.
