= Ampatuan =

Ampatuan is a surname and it refers to a political family in the Philippines. Notable people with the surname include:

- Andal Ampatuan Sr., former governor of Maguindanao province, the Philippines, and co-suspect in the Maguindanao massacre
- Andal Ampatuan Jr., former mayor of Datu Unsay, Maguindanao province, and primary suspect in the Maguindanao Massacre
- Zaldy Ampatuan (b. 1967), former governor of the Autonomous Region in Muslim Mindanao (ARMM) in the Philippines

== See also ==
- Ampatuan, Maguindanao del Sur, municipality in the Philippines
