= Zaldy (disambiguation) =

Zaldy is a masculine given name. Notable people with the name include:

- Zaldy Ampatuan, Filipino mass murderer and ex-politician
- Elizaldy "Zaldy" Co, Filipino businessman and politician
- Zaldy Goco, American fashion designer
- Zaldy Realubit, Filipino basketball player
- Zaldy Villa, Filipino politician
- Zaldy Zshornack, Filipino actor
