= Esmael Mangudadatu =

Filipino politician (born 1968)

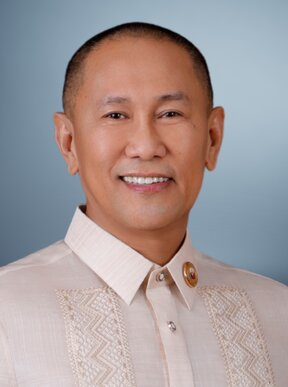
- Official portrait, 2026

Member of the Philippine House of Representatives from Maguindanao del Sur's at-large congressional district
- Incumbent
- Assumed office June 30, 2025
- Preceded by: Mohamad Paglas

Member of the Philippine House of Representatives from Maguindanao's 2nd congressional district
- In office June 30, 2019 – June 30, 2022
- Preceded by: Datu Zajid G. Mangudadatu
- Succeeded by: Mohamad Paglas

Governor of Maguindanao
- In office June 30, 2010 – June 30, 2019
- Vice Governor: Datu Ismael "Dustin" Mastura (2010–2013); Lester Sinsuat (2013–2019)
- Preceded by: Nariman Ambolodto (acting governor); Andal Ampatuan Sr.
- Succeeded by: Mariam Sangki-Mangudadatu

Vice Mayor of Buluan, Maguindanao
- In office June 30, 2007 – June 30, 2010
- Mayor: Ibrahim Mangudadatu
- Succeeded by: King Jhazzer Mangudadatu

Mayor of Buluan, Maguindanao
- In office June 30, 1998 – June 30, 2007
- Succeeded by: Ibrahim Mangudadatu

Member of the Maguindanao Provincial Board
- In office June 30, 1995 – June 30, 1998

Personal details
- Born: August 15, 1968 (age 58) Buluan, Cotabato, Philippines
- Party: PFP (2024–present); BFP (local party; 2026–present)
- Other political affiliations: UBJP (2021–2026); PDP–Laban (2016–2024); Liberal (2010–2016); Lakas (before 2010)
- Spouse: Genalyn Tiamzon (m. 1991; died 2009) Sharifa Akeel (m. 2022)
- Relations: Pua Mangudadatu (father); Pax Mangudadatu (uncle); Zajid Mangudadatu (brother)
- Education: University of Mindanao (BA)

Esmael "Toto" Gaguil Mangudadatu (Tagalog: [mɐŋʊdɐˈdatʊʔ]; born August 15, 1968) is a Filipino politician who is the representative of Maguindanao del Sur's lone district, having been elected in 2025. He previously served as the representative of the then-undivided Maguindanao's 2nd district from 2019 to 2022. He also served as the governor of Maguindanao from 2010 to 2019. In Buluan town, he served as the mayor from 1998 to 2007, and vice mayor from 2007 to 2010.

In the 2009 Maguindanao massacre, Mangudadatu's family members, aides, lawyers, and supporters, plus several journalists, were kidnapped and murdered while on their way to file Mangudadatu's candidacy for the gubernatorial elections. Andal Ampatuan Jr., Mangudadatu's scheduled opponent for the 2010 elections, was charged with the murders. In 2019, Andal Jr. and his brother Zaldy, as well as their associates, were convicted of the murders.

== Early life ==
Mangudadatu was born on August 15, 1968, to Pua Mangudadatu, a politician who was president of the "Magnificent 7", a group of influential politicians in the province at the time. His uncle is Pax Mangudadatu, incumbent representative of the 1st district of Sultan Kudarat in Tacurong City.

Seeking to escape political dynasty, Mangudadatu went to University in order to become a doctor. It was there that Mangudadatu met his wife Genalyn, a Hiligaynon Visayan, while they were both students in Davao City, Mindanao. They married on November 11, 1991, and had multiple children. Starting a family after getting married cut his medical studies short but he later earned his political science degree from the University of Mindanao in Davao City.

== Political career ==
Mangudadatu visited the then governor of Maguindanao province, Zacaria Candao, to obtain approval for a new business venture. Instead, Candao, who was also Mangudadatu's godfather, talked him into running for office. He was a member of Maguindanao's Sangguniang Panlalawigan (provincial board) from 1995 to 1998. He then became mayor of Buluan from 1998 to 2007. In the 2007 elections, he became vice mayor of Buluan. In 2009 he decided to challenge the Ampatuan clan's heir apparent in the election for governor of Maguindanao province.

He was instrumental for the proposed creation of a new province to be called as Maguindanao North, which will be composed of the First Legislative District of Maguindanao.

After being term-limited as governor, Mangudadatu served as representative for Maguindanao's 1st district from 2019 to 2022. He is among the 70 representatives who voted "yes" to "kill" (reject) the franchise renewal of the said network, the largest in the Philippines.

=== Maguindanao massacre ===
The Maguindanao massacre occurred on the morning of November 23, 2009, in the town of Ampatuan in Maguindanao province, on the island of Mindanao in the Philippines. The victims were about to file a certificate of candidacy for Esmael Mangudadatu. Mangudadatu was challenging Datu Unsay mayor Andal Ampatuan Jr., son of the incumbent Maguindanao governor Andal Ampatuan Sr., in the forthcoming Maguindanao gubernatorial election, part of the national elections in 2010. The 57 people killed included Mangudadatu's wife, two of his sisters, and a cousin, in addition to numerous journalists, lawyers, aides, and motorists who were witnesses or were mistakenly identified as part of the convoy. Mangudadatu told reporters that his wife was able to call her husband just before she was killed, "She said... they had been stopped by 100 uniformed armed men... then her line got cut off,"

The man thought responsible, Andal Ampatuan Jr. denied that he was responsible and instead blamed the MILF, an armed Islamic group that operates in the Southern Philippines. MILF released a statement denying that it was responsible.

=== 2010 elections ===
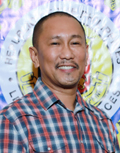
Mangudadatu in 2016

Four days after the massacre, Mangudadatu traveled along the same road where the attack had occurred to successfully file his candidacy in the election. He ran under the banner of the Lakas–Kampi–CMD party. In the party, Mangudadatu replaced his rivals from the Ampatuan clan who perpetrated the massacre. He won the election and then served three terms as governor.

=== Gaisano Mall shootings ===
On February 11, 2010, Tamano Kamendan approached Mangudadatu and his entourage at the Gaisano South Citimall in Davao City. An altercation took place and Kamendan was killed by Esmael Mangudadatu's bodyguard. Mangudadatu released a statement that Kamendan was an associate of the Ampatuan clan and that he was trying to kidnap his children. Kamendan's wife denied the Ampatuan connection and has stated in an affidavit that her husband was just shopping when Mangudadatu ordered his men to shoot him. On February 14, 2010, Mangudadatu and his bodyguard were charged with murder. The charge against Mangudadatu was dismissed in August 2011.

=== Tacurong city car bombing ===
On August 15, 2011, Mangudadatu's convoy was involved in a car bombing incident along a highway in Tacurong city, Sultan Kudarat. Two people were killed, including a Maguindanao board member, while six others were wounded. The bomb exploded while Mangudadatu's convoy was cruising along the highway in Tacurong. The governor and his followers were heading to a restaurant to celebrate his birthday.

The bomb, placed inside an old, white Kia vehicle parked at the side of the road fronting the Cherubim Methodist Learning Center in Alunan Highway, exploded when a Toyota Fortuner, where the provincial board member was on board, passed near it. Mangudadatu was unhurt because his vehicle was bullet-proof.
