= Jocelyn Solis-Reyes =

Filipino Lawyer and Judge

Quezon City Regional Trial Court branch 221 Judge
- Incumbent
- Assumed office 2004

Presiding Judge of the Municipal Trial Court in Angeles and Olongapo
- In office May 2001 – 2004

Personal details
- Education: University of Santo Tomas
- Occupation: Judge

Jocelyn Solis-Reyes (born c. 1960) is a judge from the Philippines. She is, as of June 2010, the presiding judge of the Maguindanao massacre trial. She is attached to the Quezon City Regional Trial Court Branch 221.

Solis-Reyes is an alumna of the University of Santo Tomas Faculty of Civil Law. She served from 1992 to 1995 as a public attorney and was, from 1995 to 2000, a public prosecutor. In May 2001, she became the Presiding Judge of the Municipal Trial Court of Angeles City, Pampanga and Olongapo, Zambales. She was then appointed in 2004 as the Presiding Judge of the Quezon City Regional Trial Court Branch 221. Among her early prominent cases was the 2007 prosecution of Chief Public Attorney Persida Rueda-Acosta by an attorney alleging illegal termination of her employment. Solis-Reyes ultimately recused from the case.

Solis-Reyes was assigned to the Maguindanao massacre case by lottery draw in December 2009, after the previously selected judge, Luisito Cortez, had declined the case on security grounds. Solis-Reyes initially refused security when assigned to the Ampatuan case, but was later assigned Philippine National Police protection under a compulsory provision.
