= Political family =

Family in which several members are involved in politics

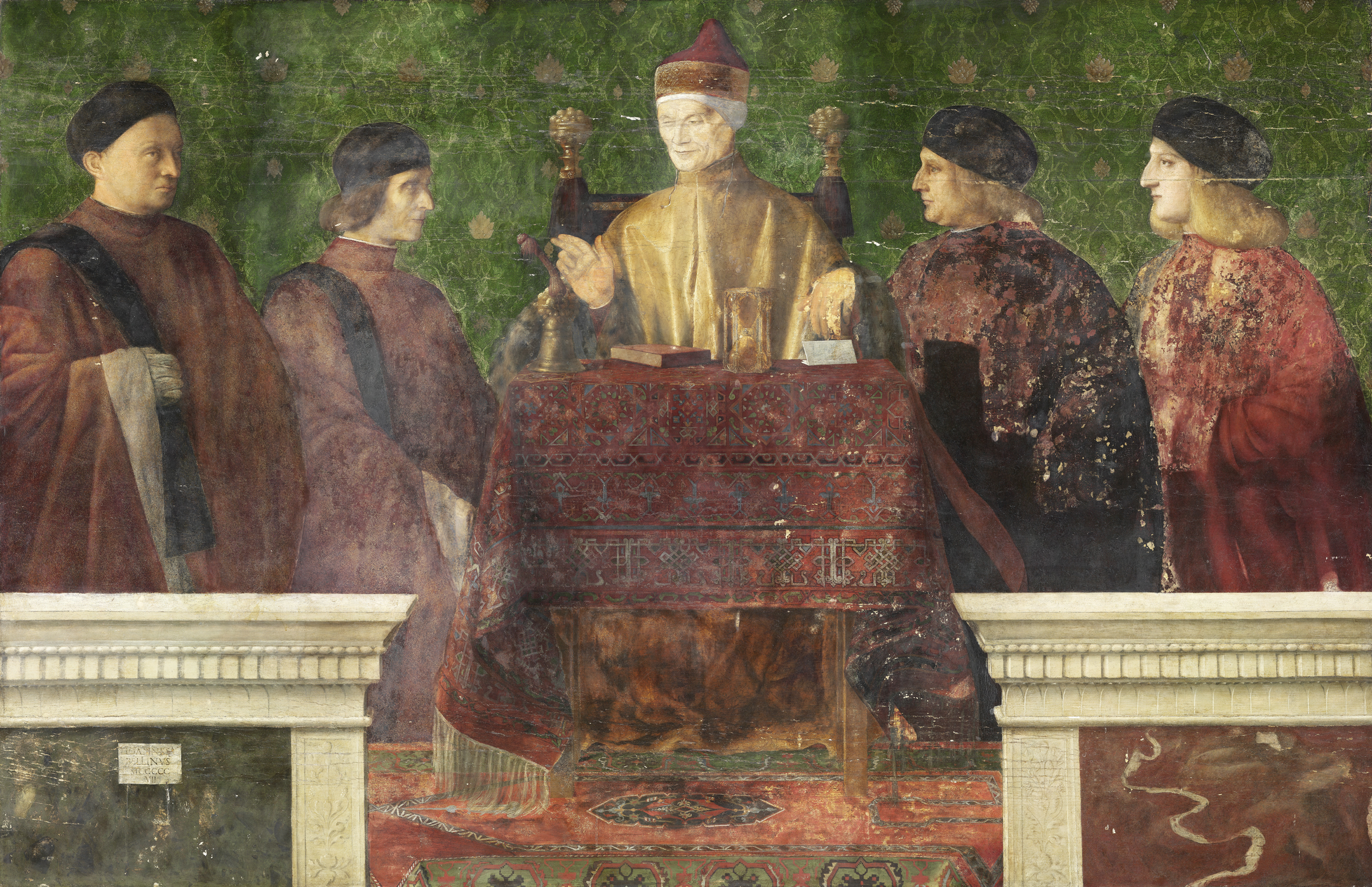
Portrait of the Loredan Family (1507), by Giovanni Bellini.

A political family (also referred to as a political dynasty) is a family in which multiple members are involved in politics, particularly electoral politics. Members may be related by blood or marriage; often several generations or multiple siblings may be involved. Political families often enjoy significant advantages in electoral competition and cabinet appointments, though this varies both over time and across countries.

== Overview ==
In politics, power has been passed down in families throughout recorded history. This was a common feature of monarchies, but in recent times this phenomenon has also been observed in democratic republics. Political families often exercise a lot of political authority, and in many cases can affect participation in government processes.

The Loredan family was one of Venice's most prominent political dynasties. Many of its members held high political positions in the Republic of Venice.

The Indonesian parliament, which represents the third largest democracy in the world, passed a law barring anyone from holding a major office within five years of a relative. In India, three members of the Nehru–Gandhi family (Jawaharlal Nehru, Indira Gandhi and Rajiv Gandhi) have served as Prime Minister of India. Rajiv's wife Sonia Gandhi and son, Rahul Gandhi, served as the President of the Indian National Congress, and daughter, Priyanka Gandhi, served as a Member of Parliament.

Political families or dynasties in the Philippines can be traced back to the Spanish colonial era with the role principalía, a class of native elites, exhibiting hereditary features. A political dynasty refers to a family with multiple members occupying elected positions either one after another or simultaneously. Nearly 250 families control politics in all 82 provinces of the Philippines at all levels. The "taipans" (the cartel of mixed political and business oligarchs), which control the politics and own various crony capitalist businesses.

The Roosevelt family in the United States is another example. 26th U.S. President Theodore Roosevelt (1901–1909) and 32nd U.S. President Franklin D. Roosevelt (1933–1945), fifth cousins by blood (their great-great-great-grandfathers were brothers) and uncle-in-law and nephew-in-law by marriage. TR and FDR each served as U.S. assistant secretary of the Navy and as governor of New York before serving as president. FDR's wife and Theodore's niece, Eleanor Roosevelt, served as adviser to the president (1933–1945), chair of the United Nations Commission on Human Rights (1946–1952), chair of the Presidential Commission on the Status of Women (1961–62).

The Kennedy's are another notable United States political family. Patrick Joseph Kennedy, Massachusetts state legislator (1884–1895); his son, Joseph P. Kennedy Sr., chair of the U.S. Maritime Commission (1934–35) and the U.S. Securities and Exchange Commission (1937–38), and U.S. ambassador to Great Britain (1938–1940. Joseph and Rose Kennedy's children included John F. Kennedy, 35th U.S. president (1961–1963), U.S. House of Representatives (1947–1953) and U.S. Senate (1953–1961) from Massachusetts; Robert F. Kennedy, U.S. attorney general (1961–1964) and U.S. Senate from New York (1965–1968); Ted Kennedy, U.S. Senate from Massachusetts (1962–2009), among other family members.

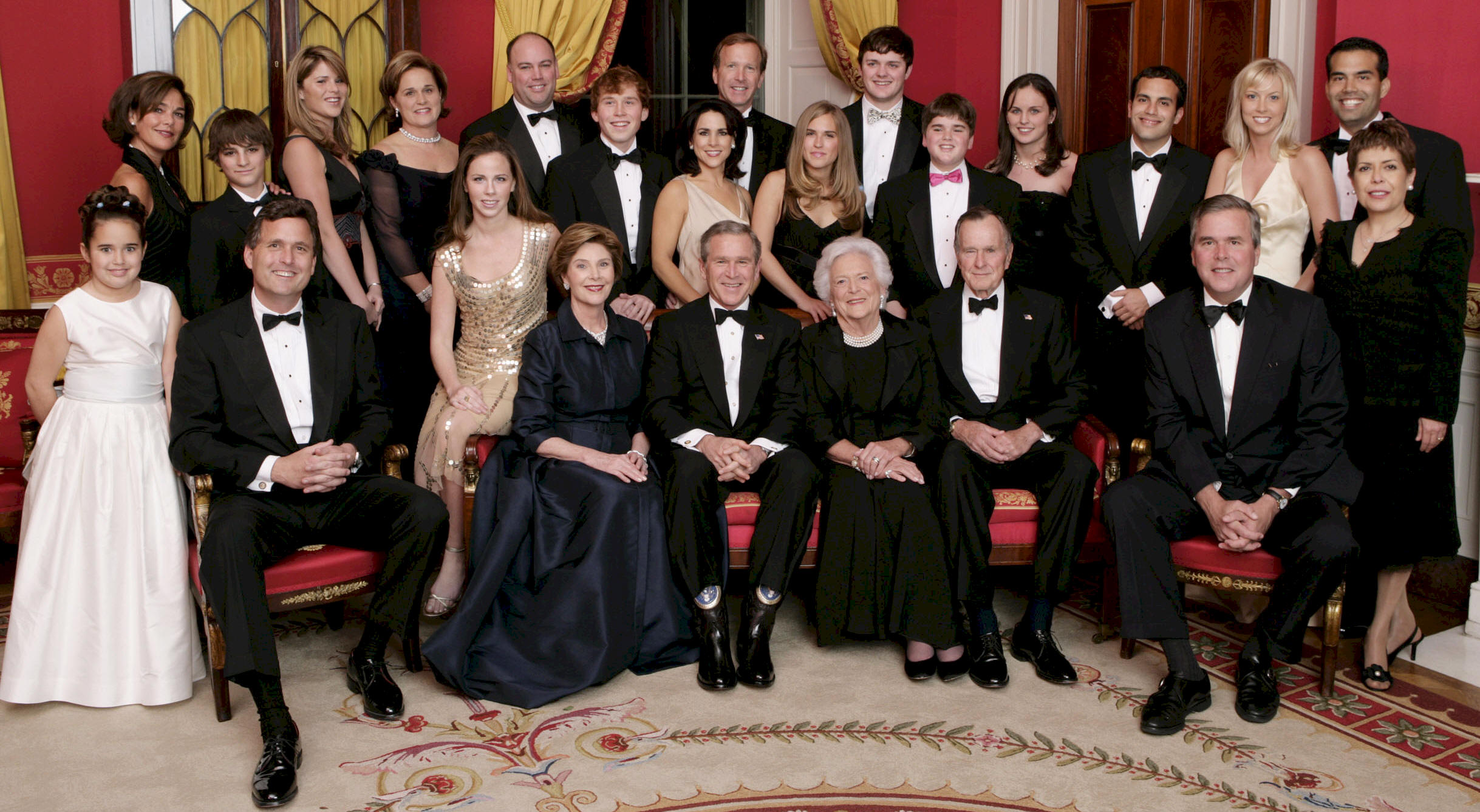
The Bush Family

Both the Bush family and Clinton family have reached prominence in US politics.

45th (2017–21) and 47th (2025–) U.S. President Donald Trump and his family members have held prominent political positions; his daughter Ivanka Trump and son-in-law Jared Kushner, senior presidential advisers (2017–21); his daughter-in-law Lara Trump, Co-chair of the Republican National Committee (March–December 2024); his sister, Maryanne Trump Barry, U.S. district and appeals court judge (1983–2019); his fourth cousin, John Heinz, U.S. House of Representatives (1971–77) and U.S. Senate (1977–91) from Pennsylvania (their great-grandfathers were first cousins and originated from Kallstadt, Germany). The Biden family: Joe Biden, 46th U.S. president (2021–2025), 47th U.S. vice president (2009–17), U.S. senator from Delaware (1973–2009); his son, Beau Biden, state attorney general of Delaware (2007–15). President Biden's great-grandfather, Edward Francis Blewitt, Pennsylvania state senator (1907–10). Two other presidents were closely related by blood: James Madison and Zachary Taylor were second cousins. Other presidents were related by marriage: George Washington's nephew, George Steptoe Washington, was Madison's brother-in-law. Dwight Eisenhower's grandson, David Eisenhower, married Julie Nixon, a daughter of Richard Nixon.

== See also ==
- List of political families
- Political families of Australia
- Hereditary politicians
- Nepotism
- Oligarchy
- Nobility
- Political boss
- Widow's succession
