= Maguindanao massacre =

2009 politically motivated mass murder in Maguindanao, Philippines

- Map of the Philippines with Maguindanao highlighted
- Location: 6°48′34″N 124°26′22″E; Sitio Masalay, Barangay Salman, Ampatuan, Maguindanao (now Maguindanao del Sur), Mindanao, Philippines
- Date: November 23, 2009; 16 years ago c. 10:30 – 11:00 a.m. (UTC+8)
- Target: Esmael Mangudadatu's family members, supporters, journalists
- Attack type: Mass shooting, mass murder, mass kidnapping, political violence
- Weapons: Firearms and machetes
- Deaths: 58 (Note: The body of Reynaldo Momay, the 58th victim, was never found.) (Esmael Mangudadatu's family members and supporters, 32 accompanying journalists, and 6 other civilians)
- Perpetrators: Zaldy Ampatuan; Andal Ampatuan Jr.
- No. of participants: 197
- Motive: Political opposition to Esmael Mangudadatu
- Verdict: See Verdict section below

The Maguindanao massacre (also known as the Ampatuan massacre, named after the town where mass graves of victims were found) occurred on the morning of November 23, 2009, in the town of Ampatuan in Maguindanao, Philippines (now located in Maguindanao del Sur). The 58 victims were on their way to file a certificate of candidacy for Esmael Mangudadatu, vice-mayor of Buluan, when they were kidnapped and later killed. Mangudadatu was challenging Datu Unsay mayor Andal Ampatuan Jr., son of the incumbent Maguindanao governor Andal Ampatuan Sr. and member of one of Mindanao's leading Muslim political clans, in the forthcoming Maguindanao gubernatorial election, part of the national elections in 2010. Those killed included Mangudadatu's wife, his two sisters, journalists, lawyers, aides, and motorists who were witnesses or were mistakenly identified as part of the convoy.

The Maguindanao massacre is one of the deadliest massacres to ever occur in the Philippines, a country known for its political oppression and corruption following the events of Ferdinand Marcos' administration. At the time, the Committee to Protect Journalists (CPJ) called the Maguindanao massacre the "single deadliest event" for journalists since they began compiling records in 1992; at least 34 journalists are known to have died in the attack. Even before the massacre, the CPJ had labelled the Philippines the second most dangerous country for journalists, second only to Iraq.

== Background ==
The Ampatuans had been in control of Maguindanao since 2001. Andal Ampatuan Sr. first came into prominence when President Corazon Aquino appointed him as Chief-of-Offices of Maganoy (now Shariff Aguak) in 1986 immediately after the People Power Revolution. Aquino, after coming into power in 1986 through a revolution, replaced every locally elected official with officers-in-charge, although the town of Maganoy was approached differently; the aging mayor, Pinagayaw Ampatuan, was replaced by his vice mayor, Andal Ampatuan Sr. He won the 1988 local elections and served for ten years. Andal Sr. was elected governor in 1998.

Members of Lakas-Kampi-CMD, President Gloria Macapagal Arroyo listed Andal Sr. as a major ally in Mindanao. Autonomous Region in Muslim Mindanao (ARMM) regional governor Zaldy Ampatuan was the party's regional chairman. Andal Sr., the family patriarch, had been provincial governor since 1998; he had been elected three times, unopposed. Eighteen of the mayors in Maguindanao belong to the clan. The elder Ampatuan attributed his popularity to "popular support", adding that "Because I am so loved by the constituencies of the municipalities, they ask me to have my sons as representatives." In the 2004 presidential election, Arroyo won 69% of Maguindanao's vote; three years later, the party-backed coalition scored a 12–0 sweep of the senatorial elections in the province. Unable to run for a third term, he groomed his son, Andal Jr., to succeed him as governor.

With escalating tensions in the province, Arroyo, as head of Lakas-Kampi-CMD, mediated between the Ampatuans and the Mangudadatus (both are from the same party) to prevent election-related violence. Three meetings were held in mid-2009, with one meeting hosted by then-Secretary of National Defense and 2009–2010 party chairman Gilberto Teodoro, who ran to succeed Arroyo as president but was defeated by Noynoy Aquino. Arroyo's adviser for political affairs, Gabriel Claudio, disclosed that there was an initial agreement "in principle" that no Mangudadatu would contest Ampatuan Sr.'s governorship.

== Attack ==
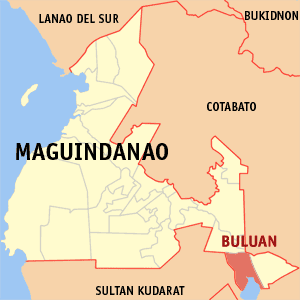
Location of Buluan, the origin of the convoy, in Maguindanao.

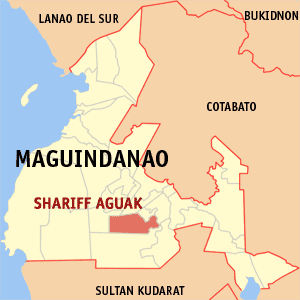
Location of Shariff Aguak, the destination of the convoy, in Maguindanao.

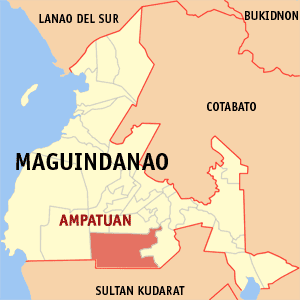
Location of Ampatuan, the location where the massacre took place, in Maguindanao.

=== Prior events ===
Buluan Vice Mayor Esmael "Toto" Mangudadatu had invited 37 journalists to cover the scheduled filing of his certificate of candidacy (COC) at the Commission on Elections (COMELEC) provincial office in Shariff Aguak. His stated reason for this was that he had received threats from rival politicians who had threatened to chop him into pieces once he filed his COC, and felt the presence of journalists would deter such an attack. The same week he was to file his COC, Mangudadatu requested for security from the Philippine National Police Regional Command in the Autonomous Region in Muslim Mindanao, but the request was rejected. There was speculation that this was done on the behest of regional governor Zaldy Ampatuan, one of the perpetrators of the massacre.

Because of this, Mangudadatu changed plans; instead of personally going to Shariff Aguak, he would send an all-women party led by his wife, two sisters, and an aunt with female lawyers, in order to file his COC on his behalf. Some reports suggest he was relying on an Islamic tradition that women are not to be harmed. Accompanying the women would be journalists and correspondents from South Cotabato and General Santos. Hours before the group departed, Aquiles Zonio, a correspondent for the Philippine Daily Inquirer from General Santos, texted the Philippine Army's 6th Infantry Division and was assured the road was safe.

The party was supposed to leave for Shariff Aguak at 9 am, but their departure was delayed by about 30 minutes due to security concerns. The convoy was composed of seven vehicles: five Toyota Grandia vans, at least four of which were owned by the Mangudadatu family, and two more media vehicles – a Mitsubishi Pajero owned by DZRH broadcast journalist Henry Araneta, and a Mitsubishi L-300 van owned by UNTV. One of the Grandia vans lagged behind the rest of the vehicles and turned around once its occupants realized what was happening.

=== Kidnapping and massacre ===
At around 10:00 am, the convoy was passing through the town of Ampatuan when it stopped at a police checkpoint in Barangay Masalay, about 10 km from Shariff Aguak, for a routine inspection. At that moment, at least ten vehicles carrying heavily armed gunmen arrived and surrounded the convoy. The men, led by Andal Ampatuan Jr., took the occupants of the vehicles as hostages and ordered the policemen who were present to step aside. According to the Inquirer, several of the gunmen were from the Citizen Armed Force Geographical Unit (CAFGU), an irregular auxiliary force of the AFP, and civilian volunteer organizations (CVOs). The gunmen initially forced the victims to get out and lie down on the ground and took their personal belongings from them, before ordering them back into their vehicles.

There were two other vehicles that were also present at the checkpoint but were not part of the convoy: a red Toyota Vios and a light blue Toyota Tamaraw FX. The Vios had five occupants: Eduardo Lechonsito, a government employee who was bound for a hospital in Cotabato City after suffering a mild stroke that morning; Lechonsito's wife Cecille; co-workers Mercy Palabrica and Daryll delos Reyes; and the driver Wilhelm Palabrica. The FX was driven by Anthony Ridao, an employee of the National Statistics Coordination Board and son of Cotabato City councilor Marino Ridao. The occupants of these vehicles were mistaken as being part of the convoy and were also captured by the gunmen.

Some of Ampatuan Jr.'s men commandeered the waylaid vehicles and drove them out to a remote area of Ampatuan, where the victims were once again forced out of their vehicles. During this time, Mangudadatu's wife made a phone call to her husband at around 10:15 am, in which she said that they were being held by at least 100 gunmen whom she identified as the men of Ampatuan Jr. The call was abruptly cut short when Ampatuan Jr. himself apparently pulled her out of the car she was in and slapped her, causing her to drop her cellphone.

Gunfire erupted shortly afterwards at around 10:30 am. There is evidence that at least five of the female victims, four of them journalists, were raped before being killed, while "practically all" of the women had been shot in their genitals. Mangudadatu's youngest sister and aunt were both pregnant at the time of their murders.

After the massacre had ended, the perpetrators began burying the victims in three mass graves, which had been dug two days prior using a backhoe emblazoned with the name of Maguindanao Governor Andal Ampatuan Sr. A total of 35 bodies were found in these mass graves. Though the perpetrators had intended to bury all of the victims, they were forced to flee after learning that military units were approaching their location. The soldiers arrived at the site at 3:00 pm, more than four hours after the massacre took place.

== Aftermath ==
According to the authorities, the attack killed 58 people, including 32 journalists. However, the body of 58th victim was never found. Reporters Without Borders announced that at least 12 of the victims were journalists, making this the deadliest such incident in the history of news media. The National Union of Journalists in the Philippines originally estimated that a total of 20 journalists were killed, including an undisclosed number of NUJP members. The Philippine Daily Inquirer later updated the number of journalists killed to 34.

On November 24, the president of the Philippines Gloria Macapagal Arroyo responded to the news of the massacre by declaring a state of emergency in Maguindanao, Sultan Kudarat and Cotabato City. Speaker of the House Prospero Nograles called on the police to quickly identify the perpetrators of the massacre and disarm private armies. The Philippine Department of Justice created a panel of special prosecutors to handle cases arising from the massacre.

Nueva Ecija Rep. Eduardo Nonato N. Joson said the massacre might affect, or even lead to the cancellation of, the scheduled 2010 presidential elections. Candidates in the election condemned the massacre.

On Wednesday, November 25, 2009, the executive committee of the Lakas-Kampi-CMD political party unanimously voted to expel three members of the Ampatuan family – Maguindanao Gov. Datu Andal Ampatuan Sr. and his two sons, Gov. Datu Zaldy Ampatuan of the Autonomous Region in Muslim Mindanao (ARMM) and Mayor Andal Ampatuan Jr. – from the party for their alleged role in the Maguindanao massacre. An emergency meeting of the Lakas-Kampi-CMD was held in Pasig, during which the Ampatuans were stripped of their membership.

On Thursday, November 26, 2009, Ampatuan Jr. surrendered to his brother Zaldy, was delivered to adviser to the peace process Jesus Dureza, then was flown to General Santos on his way to Manila, where he was taken to the National Bureau of Investigation (NBI) headquarters. Police in the Philippines charged Andal Ampatuan Jr. with murder. Ampatuan denied the charges, claiming that he was at the provincial capitol in Shariff Aguak when the massacre took place. He instead blamed the Moro Islamic Liberation Front (MILF), specifically Umbra Kato, as the mastermind, a charge the MILF dismissed as "absurd."

=== Declaration of martial law ===
On December 4, 2009, through Proclamation No. 1959, President Gloria Macapagal Arroyo officially placed Maguindanao province under a state of martial law, thereby suspending the privilege of the writ of habeas corpus. Executive Secretary Eduardo Ermita said the step was taken in order to avert the escalation of "lawless" violence in the province and pave the way for the swift arrest of the suspects in the massacre. Following the declaration, authorities carried out a raid on a warehouse owned by Andal Ampatuan Jr. The raid resulted in the confiscation of more than 330,000 rounds of 5.56×45mm NATO ammunition, a Humvee, and an improvised armored vehicle. Twenty militiamen were arrested on the premises. Captain James Nicolas of Special Forces was able to retrieve more high powered firearms and ammo after the incident. In the same raid, law enforcement also uncovered thousands of voter IDs buried in the ground. The state of martial law in Maguindanao was lifted on December 13, 2009.

=== Media fundraising ===
UNTV-37 arranged a fund-raising concert at the Araneta Coliseum for the families of 32 members of the media who perished in the attack.

=== Police operations ===
Philippine Police and soldiers raided several of the Ampatuan family's houses and homes, in Maguindanao's capital, Shariff Aguak, and next to the provincial headquarters, a compound surrounded by concrete walls about two metres (six feet) high and contains the homes of a number of Ampatuan clan members. Two of the other homes targeted in the raids belonged to Akmad Ampatuan, Ampatuan Snr's brother who is the vice governor of Maguindanao, according to national police chief Jesus Verzosa. Philippines National Police seized several armored personnel carriers, over a thousand military weapons including machine guns, assault and sniper rifles, sub-machine guns, shotguns, pistols, mortar launchers and rounds, grenades, rocket launchers, and caches of ammo and several military uniforms in one house, several buried weapons, ammo and COMELEC IDs in a vacant lot, rifles, shotguns, pistols, machine guns, SMGs and ammo, explosives and military uniforms in Zaldy's house. Andal's house had more weapons and ammo with military uniforms inside. The raids yielded weapons powerful enough to arm a battalion of soldiers, and ammo crates bearing the name of Department of National Defense (Philippines). This situation was facilitated by Philippine law, which permits local government officials to legally buy an unlimited number of weapons without any obligation to report the type or number purchased.

== Legal proceedings ==
People of the Philippines v. Ampatuan Jr., et al.
- Court: Quezon City Regional Trial Court
- Branch: 221
Full case name
People of the Philippines v. Datu Andal "Unsay" Ampatuan Jr., Datu Andal Ampatuan Sr., Datu Zaldy "Puti" U. Ampatuan, Datu Akmad "Tato" Ampatuan Sr., Datu Sajid Islam U. Ampatuan, Datu Anwar U. Ampatuan Sr., Takpan Dilon y Manibpol, PCINSP Sukarno A. Dicay, PSINSP Abdulgapor B. Abad, PSUPT Abusama Mundas Maguid al-Haj, PSUPT Bahnarin U. Kamaong, PSUPT Abdulwahid U. Pedtucasan, SPO2 George S. Labayan, SPO2 Badawi P. Bakal, SPO1 Oscar Donato, SPO1 Samad Usman Maguindra, SPO1 Alimola L. Guianaton, SPO1 Ali Mluk Solano, SPO1 Eduardo H. Ong, SPO1 Elizer S. Rendaje, PO3 Gibrael R. Alano, PO3 Felix Ababao Daquilos, PO3 Abibudin S. Abdulgani, PO3 Ricky D. Balanueco, PO3 Rasid T. Anton, PO3 Felix E. Enate Jr., PO2 Hamad Nana, PO2 Kendatu S. Rakim, PO2 Hernanie S. Decipulo Jr., PO2 Saudiar Ulah, PO2 Saudi Pasutan, PO2 Rexson D. Guiama, PO1 Herich Amaba, PO1 Badjun Ibad Panegas, PO1 Bensedick T. Alfonso, PO1 Mohammad K. Balading, PO1 Datu Jerry M. Utto, PO1 Abdula Baguadatu, PO1 Tamano Sahibal Hadi, PO1 Abdulbayan U. Mundas, PO1 Esprielito G. Lejarso, PO1 Esmael Manuel Guidal, PO1 Jimmy M. Kadtong, PO1 Marjul T. Julkadi, PO1 Abdurahman S. Batarasa, PO1 Abdulanan L. Saavedra, PO1 Marsman E. Nilong, PO1 Narkouk D. Mascud, PO1 Arnulfo A. Soriano, PO1 Rainer T. Ebus, PO1 Ebara G. Bebot, PO1 Pendatun A. Dima, PO1 Michael M. Macarongon, Datu Jimmy Ampatuan y Masukat, Datu Kanor Ampatuan, Datu Bahnarin A. Ampatuan, Datu Mama Ampatuan, Datu Saudi Ampatuan Jr., Datu Anwar Sajid "Ulo" U. Ampatuan, Datu Anwar "Ipi" U. Ampatuan Jr., Datu Harris Ampatuan, Datu Moning Ampatuan, Mogira Hadji Anggulat, Parido Zangkala Gogo, Jun Pendatun, Kagi Faizal, PINSP Rex Ariel T. Diongon, PINSP Michael Joy Macaraeg, PINSP Saudi M. Mokamad, PO2 Tany Dalgan, PO1 Amir Solaiman, PO1 Michael Madsig y Juanitas, PO1 Sandy D. Sabang, PO1 Ysmael Baraquir, PO1 Abbey Guiadem, PO1 Ebad Musa, PO1 Cader Datunot, PO1 Pia Kamidon, PO1 Dukoy Badal, PO1 Alfie Pagabangan, PO1 Warden Kusain Legawan, PO1 Jonathan Engid y Solaiman, PO1 Datu Nor Kadir, PO1 Joharto Kamindan, PO1 Anwar D. Masukat, Sgt. Abdullah Karim Falcon, Sgt. Banzar Maulana, Sgt. Abdul Sokor Abdullah, Sgt. Alnor Ampatuan, Datu Norodin "Nords" Datumanong Ampatuan, Hamid Delayudin, Datu Dainga Ampatuan, Rodel U. Ampatuan, Manny Upam Ampatuan, Misuari S. Ampatuan, Kertz B. Ampatuan, Tony Kenis Ampatuan, Jonathan S. Ampatuan, Intan B. Ampatuan, Mohades A. Ampatuan, Kagi Amar Ampatuan, Mohamad D. Ampatuan, Rek Tony T. Dek, Abas G. Anongan, Muhamad Sangki, Datutuhon M. Esmael, Alex U. Zaipon, Moactar T. Daud, Dhods A. Kamong, Alimudin S. Sanguyod, Fahad Watamama Utto, Surin K. Mentang, Haron K. Arob, Samsudin M. Daud, Theng P. Sali, Toktok K. Guiabal, Batuta G. Zailon, Macton A. Bilungan, Nasser S. Esmael, Abedin Alamada, Maot M. Bangkulat, Bong S. Andal, Mando M. Balangan, Rene Guiapal, Latip Gani, Alex Kadil, Kamper Silongan, Sukor S. Kamsa, Edres G. Kasan, Akad B. Macaton, Maot M. Dumla, Naser Talib, Sanggutin Musa, Rolex Kusen, Buto Umal, Surin Kayukay, Batuti K. Bara, Bassir L. Abdulmaguid, Gambayan M. Kasim, Mamugkay R. Camsa, Taya M. Bangkulat, Zamora G. Sambulawan, Salik S. Bangkulat, Tokan A. Pamsag, Abdul Maula E. Uday, Maguid S. Alba, Tho Akmad Amino, Tumi Timba Abas, Mads P. Utto, Abedin E. Kenny, Gie S. Takilid, Malaguial S. Tanuri, Zacaria P. Akil, Tintingan Kamad Makaalay, Andami M. Singkala, Nasrudin S. Guiamadil, Denga O. Mentol, Toy K. Datumanong, Samaon M. Andatuan, Kudza Masukat Uguia, Ibrahim Ibrahim, Salipad M. Tampogao, Talembo "Tammy" Masukat, Ben A. Mendog, Sahid A. Guiamadil, Abdullah Bacar Abdullah, Kominie K. Inggo, Esiam Mantawil, Mama Habib, Mohamad K. Macauyag, Rusty U. Daud, Kasim T. Lingkong, Abusama B. Guiapal, Rakim M. Amil, Datunot G. Ayob, Norman M. Tatak, Butukan S. Malang, Sonny K. Pindi, Kasim K. Dalending, Edris Tekay Nanding, Abdulkarim L. Manalasan, Maguid Amil Datun, Thong E. Guimano, Tino T. Sanday, Armando O. Ambalgan, Bolatokan Omar, Nasser M. Malaguia, Ebrahim M. Abon, Muktar Santo Kindu, Andro K. Awil, Upam S. Saudi, Samsudin R. Kamilon, Marco G. Enged, Dexson A. Saptula, Norhato M. Kamino, Mohamad T. Datumanong, Nasser I. Guia and Nasser Adam
- Decided: December 19, 2019
- Citation: Criminal Case Nos. Q-09-162148-72, Q-09162216-31, Q-10-162652-66, Q-10-163766, and GL-Q-12-173638
- Transcript(s): Decision
- Ponente: Jocelyn Solis Reyes

At least 198 suspects, including Andal Ampatuan Jr. and Andal Ampatuan Sr. and several other members of the Ampatuan clan, were charged with murder. In April 2010, the government dropped murder charges against Zaldy Ampatuan and Akhmad Ampatuan, who had presented alibis. This led to protests by family members of the victims.

Over a decade later, more than 80 of 197 suspects remained at large, including 12 Ampatuans, raising concerns over the safety of witnesses and relatives of the victims.

Senator Joker Arroyo remarked that with nearly 200 defendants and 300 witnesses, the trial could take 200 years. Prosecution lawyer Harry Roque computed that it would last more than 100 years. In a statement commemorating the massacre, the Center for Media Freedom and Responsibility remarked that the trial was "ongoing, but is rather moving slowly."

Andal Ampatuan Sr. was arraigned in a special court inside a Manila maximum-security prison on June 1, 2011, 18 months after he and a dozen family members were arrested over the killings. After a court clerk read the names of the 57 victims, he entered a plea of not guilty.

As of November 23, 2011, two years after the massacre, only Andal Sr. and his son Andal Jr. had been charged, and some 100 of the 197 persons listed on the charge sheet were still unaccounted for.

On June 28, 2012, the Court of Appeals dismissed the petition of Anwar Ampatuan to have the murder charges against him quashed. Anwar Ampatuan is the grandson of former Maguindanao governor Andal Ampatuan Sr., and is charged with 57 counts of murder. He was arrested in August 2012. In September 2012, the Quezon City Regional Trial Court deferred his arraignment pending resolution of a pending motion to determine if there is probable cause to prosecute him for the charged 57 counts of murder.

In November 2012, acting on a motion filed by Andal Ampatuan Jr., the Supreme Court set guidelines disallowing the live media broadcast of the trial but allowing the filming of the proceedings for real-time transmissions to specified viewing areas and for documentation. This ruling was in reconsideration of an earlier ruling which had allowed live media coverage.

On March 4, 2014, the prosecution rested its case against Datu Andal "Unsay" Ampatuan Jr and 27 other suspects. The prosecutors said at that time that they were not ready to rest their case against 76 other accused due to pending appeals.

In August 2014, private prosecutors alleged that state prosecutors were compromising the case in exchange for bribes, saying that some of the state prosecutors were receiving bribes as large as PHP300 million. The Department of Justice issued an official statement where Supervising Undersecretary Francisco Baraan III and the Department of Justice Panel of Prosecutors denied having received any bribes. The statement also expressed that Baraan and the panel of prosecutors had the full trust and support of Justice Secretary Leila De Lima.

Also in August 2014, several teams of defense lawyers representing the accused withdrew from the case, citing conflicts of interest among their clients and other reasons. On August 13, the court assigned a public lawyer to represent accused affected by the withdrawals, including Andal Ampatuan Sr. and his son Andal Jr.

Datu Sajid Islam Ampatuan was granted bail in January 2015 as the prosecution failed to present strong evidence warranting his detention during trial. In September, the court denied the bail petition of Ampatuan Sr's other son and one of the main accused, former Autonomous Region in Muslim Mindanao (ARMM) governor Zaldy Ampatuan. The death of Andal Ampatuan Sr. on July 17, 2015, due to complications brought about by liver cancer, removed him from the legal proceedings. The Department of Justice started the probe of 50 new suspects with a preliminary investigation in March 2015.

In a landmark ruling reported on July 6, 2017, the special court handling the trial dismissed for lack of evidence the multiple murder case filed against three suspects: Kominie Inggo, Dexson Saptula and Abas Anongan. On November 22, 2017, the Public Information Office of the Supreme Court said in a briefing that around a third of the 103 accused who remain on trial had finished presenting their evidence and that, under the guidelines issued by the Supreme Court specifically applying to this case only, the court may render judgment separately and not wait for all the accused to conclude presenting their evidence. On June 21, 2018, Philippine Justice Secretary Menardo Guevarra said that he expected the case to be concluded in 2018. In a later statement on November 21, he said that he was hopeful of a decision within the first half of 2019. On August 8, 2019, Justice Secretary Menardo Guevarra said that the case may be decided before its 10th anniversary on November 23.

=== Verdict ===
On December 19, 2019, Quezon City Regional Trial Court (RTC) Branch 221 Judge Jocelyn Solis Reyes served her judgment on the case at a special court session held at Camp Bagong Diwa in Taguig. In her verdict, the Ampatuan brothers—namely Datu Andal Ampatuan Jr. and Zaldy Ampatuan—were convicted of 57 counts of murder and sentenced to reclusion perpetua without parole. 28 co-accused (including police officers) were also convicted of 57 counts of murder and sentenced to 40 years; an additional 15 were sentenced to 6–10 years for being accessories to the crime. 55 others, including Datu Sajid Islam Ampatuan, brother of Zaldy and Andal Jr. and the mayor of Shariff Saydona Mustapha, were acquitted.

== Victims ==
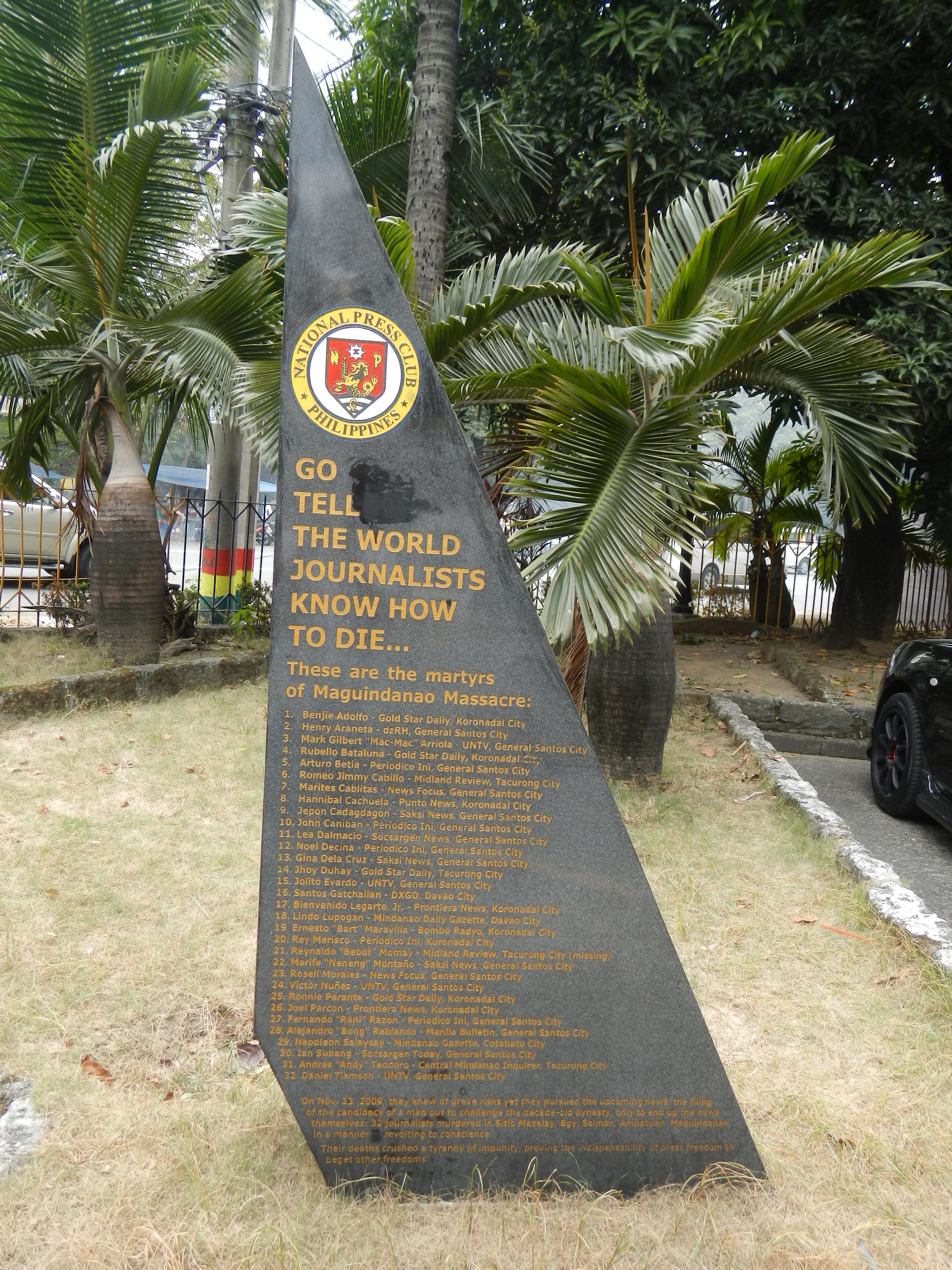
Monument, National Press Club of the Philippines

=== Mangudadatu family and associates ===
Name	Description
Genalyn Tiamson-Mangudadatu	Wife of Esmael Mangudadatu.
Eden Mangudadatu	Municipal Vice Mayor of Mangudadatu, sister of Esmael Mangudadatu.
Rowena Mangudadatu	Cousin of Esmael Mangudadatu.
Manguba Mangudadatu	Aunt of Esmael Mangudadatu.
Faridah Sabdulah	Lawyer
Farida Mangudadatu	Sister of Esmael Mangudadatu.
Concepcion "Connie" Brizuela, 56	Lawyer.
Cynthia Oquendo, 36	Lawyer.
Catalino Oquendo	Cynthia Oquendo's father.
Rasul Daud	Driver of Sultan Kudarat Rep. Pax Mangudadatu.

=== Journalists ===
Thirty-four journalists are known to have been abducted and killed in the massacre, according to the Philippine Daily Inquirer as of November 2009, only 25 had been positively identified.

Name	Description
Alejandro "Bong" Reblando, 53	Manila Bulletin correspondent, a former Associated Press reporter.
Henry Araneta	DZRH correspondent based in General Santos
Napoleon "Nap" Salaysay	DZRO manager.
Bartolome "Bart" Maravilla	Bombo Radyo Koronadal, South Cotabato.
Jhoy Duhay	Goldstar Daily.
Andy Teodoro	Central Mindanao Inquirer reporter.
Ian Subang	Mindanao Focus, a General Santos-based weekly community newspaper.
Leah Dalmacio	Mindanao Focus reporter.
Gina Dela Cruz	Mindanao Focus reporter.
Maritess Cablitas	Mindanao Focus reporter.
Neneng Montano	Saksi weekly newspaper reporter.
Victor Nuñez	UNTV reporter.
Ronnie I. Diola	UNTV cameraman.
Jolito Evardo	UNTV editor
Daniel Tiamson	UNTV driver
Reynaldo Momay	Koronadal-based journalist.
Rey Merisco	Koronadal-based journalist.
Ronnie Perante	Koronadal-based journalist.
Jun Legarta	Koronadal-based journalist.
Val Cachuela	Koronadal-based journalist.
Santos "Jun" Gatchalian	Davao City-based journalist.
Joel Parcon	Freelance journalist.
Noel Decena	Freelance journalist.
John Caniba	Freelance journalist.
Art Betia	Freelance journalist.
Ranie Razon	Freelance journalist.
Archie Ace David	Freelance journalist.
Fernanado "Ferdz" Mendoza	Freelance driver.

=== Other civilian casualties ===
Red Toyota Vios

Number of casualties: 5. They were supposedly mistaken as part of the convoy.

Name	Description
Eduardo Lechonsito	Tacurong government employee.
Cecille Lechonsito	Wife of Eduardo Lechonsito.
Mercy Palabrica	Co-worker of Eduardo Lechonsito.
Daryll delos Reyes	Co-worker of Eduardo Lechonsito.
Wilhelm Palabrica	Driver.

Blue Toyota FX

Number of casualties: 1. Mistaken as part of the convoy.

Name	Description
Anthony Ridao	National Statistics Coordination Board employee and son of Cotabato City councilor Marino Ridao.

== Human Rights Watch report ==
On November 16, 2010, the international non-governmental organization Human Rights Watch issued a 96-page report titled "They Own the People", charting the Ampatuans’ rise to power, including their use of violence to expand their control and eliminate threats to the family's rule. The report links the Ampatuans to at least 56 other killings over the last 20 years, apart from the November 23, 2009, massacre.

== In popular culture ==
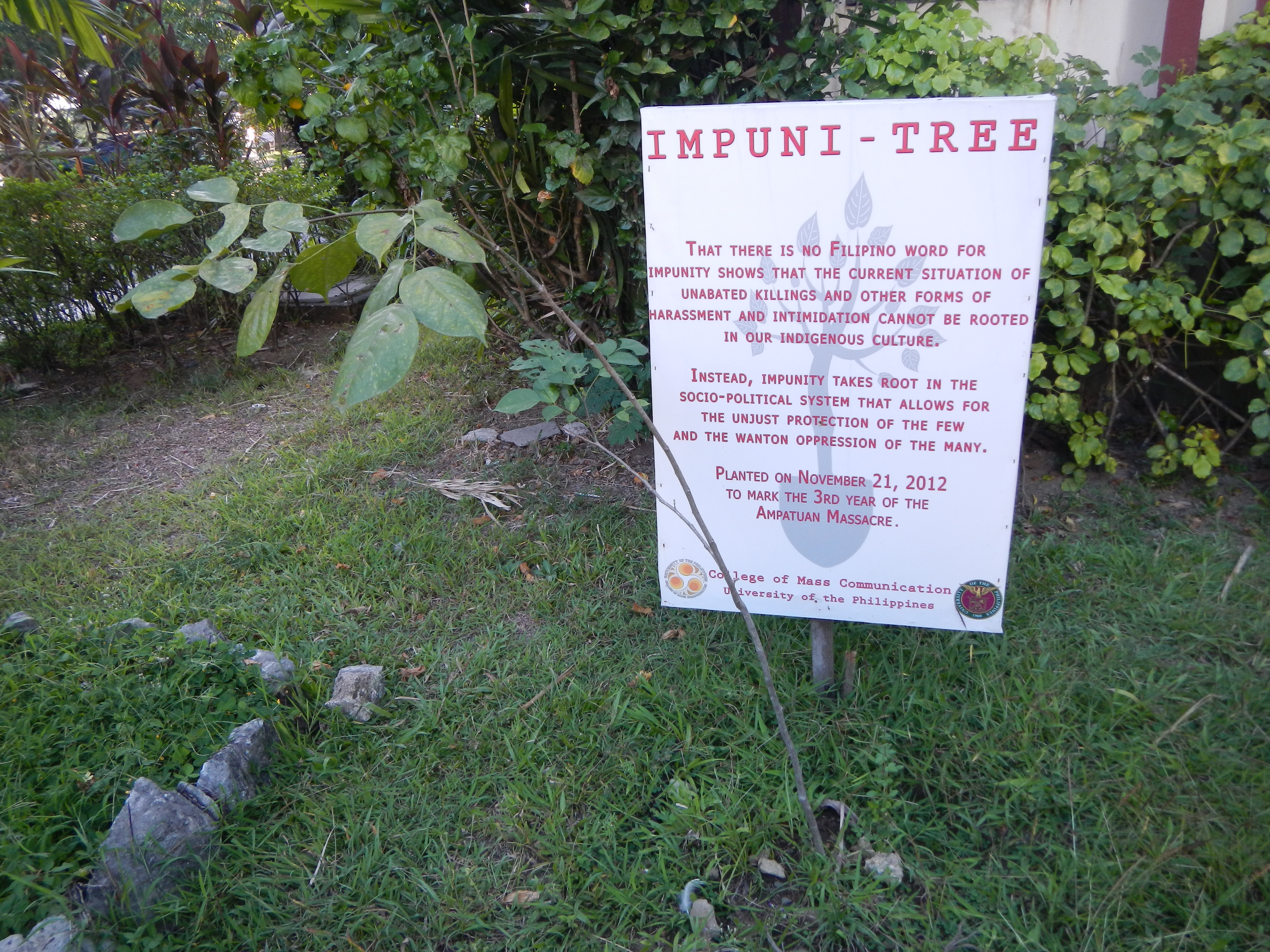
Symbolic 'Impuni-tree' planted for 3rd anniversary of Maguindanao massacre (University of the Philippines College of Mass Communication, UP Diliman).

History Asia premiered a documentary on the Maguindanao massacre entitled The Maguindanao Massacre on September 26, 2010.

Filipino-American rap artist Bambu's 2012 album, ...one rifle per family., features a song titled Massacre detailing the massacre from the point of view of a journalist who witnessed the rape, mutilation, and murder of his family.

In July 2014, in memory of the five-year anniversary of the massacre, Sacramento-based author Victoria Conlu released a novel titled Portraits of a Massacre, a fictionalized retelling set in a province similar to Maguindanao. Reviews have called the book "a stirringly severe literary intervention".

The 2017 painting The Modern Holocaust (The Maguindanao Massacre) by the Filipino artist Romulo Galicano commemorates the massacre victims. It became a finalist in the 2017–2018 Art Renewal Center Salon competition.

The 2021 crime thriller On the Job: The Missing 8 (also known as On the Job 2) is partly inspired by the case. In the film, 8 people, mostly journalists, were ambushed, killed and was believed to be buried under the orders of their town's mayor, by an inmate who is routinely released from prison to carry out assassinations. The director Erik Matti said to New Musical Express (NME) that the film's themes were about tackling corruption in the Philippine media and would deliver a social commentary on the current state of the Philippine government.

An upcoming adult animated documentary film 58th would similarly portray the massacre and the missing of the last victim that never found, directed by Carl Joseph Papa.

== Sexual assaults ==
Lara Tan reporting for CNN Philippines on December 20, 2019, reported that three of the massacre's female victims, Rahima Palawan, Leah Dalmacio, and Cecil Lechonsito, were all devout and peaceful adherents of the Muslim faith, believing that women should not be raped or murdered while exercising the right to free speech.

The Quezon City Regional Trial Court found that the three women had been sexually assaulted and mutilated. In her 761-page decision, Judge Jocelyn Solis-Reyes cited the findings of Dr. Dean Cabrera, a medico-legal officer from the Philippines National Police Crime Laboratory who conducted forensic science examinations on the women victims.

== See also ==
- Extrajudicial killings and forced disappearances in the Philippines
- International Day to End Impunity
- List of journalists killed under the Arroyo administration
- List of massacres in the Philippines
- 2015 Mamasapano clash
