= Andal Ampatuan Sr. =

Filipino politician (1941–2015)

Governor of Maguindanao
- In office June 30, 2001 – 2008
- Vice Governor: Sajid Ampatuan (2004–2008)
- Preceded by: Zacaria Candao
- Succeeded by: Sajid Ampatuan

Mayor of Maganoy (Shariff Aguak)
- In office 1988 – June 30, 1998
- In office ?–1986

Personal details
- Born: c. 1940 Mindanao, Commonwealth of the Philippines
- Died: July 17, 2015 (aged 74–75) Quezon City, Philippines
- Party: Lakas–CMD/Lakas–Kampi–CMD (until 2009)
- Spouse(s): Laila Uy and 5 others
- Children: Around 40, including Zaldy and Andal Jr.

Andal Ampatuan Sr. (1940/1941 – July 17, 2015) was a Filipino politician who was the main suspect in the Maguindanao massacre. He was the patriarch of the Ampatuan political family in Maguindanao province, on the island of Mindanao in the Philippines. He was elected Governor of Maguindanao in 2001, defeating incumbent Governor Zacaria Candao.

== Political career ==
Ampatuan was a vice mayor when President Ferdinand Marcos appointed him as mayor and officer-in-charge of Maganoy (now Shariff Aguak). When Corazon Aquino came into power via the 1986 EDSA People Power Revolution, she replaced every locally elected official with officers-in-charge. Ampatuan Sr. was replaced by another Ampatuan, Datu Modi who served for two years in that capacity.

After the 1988 local election, Andal Ampatuan Sr. served for ten years as mayor. In the 2001 elections, Andal Sr. was elected as governor.

In 2001, the Ampatuan clan solidified its hold on power through a close friendship with Gloria Macapagal Arroyo when she assumed the presidency following the Second EDSA Revolution. During the 2004 presidential elections, Arroyo dominated the polls in Shariff Aguak and most of Maguindanao. Amid speculation that cheating had occurred in Maguindanao and other Mindanao provinces, results were contested by Arroyo's main rival, popular actor Fernando Poe Jr. The 2007 midterm elections for the Philippine Senate had Maguindanao in focus once more as it was the only province that returned a 12-0 win for Arroyo's Senate slate, Team Unity.

The Citizen Armed Force Geographical Unit (CAFGU) was created on July 25, 1987, when President Aquino signed Executive Order No. 264 entitled "Providing for the Citizen Armed Force".

In 2006, Arroyo issued Executive Order 546, allowing local officials and the police to deputize local militia to aid in the fight against insurgents. These are locally known as civilian volunteer organizations or CVOs. The Executive Order was issued shortly after an assassination attempt on Andal Ampatuan Sr.

== Role in the Maguindanao massacre ==
Ampatuan's sons, Zaldy Ampatuan and Andal Ampatuan Jr., are both members of his political clan. Andal Ampatuan Jr. came to international attention in November 2009 as the prime suspect in the Maguindanao massacre. As a result, all three Ampatuans were expelled from President Arroyo's Lakas–Kampi–CMD political party. Andal Jr. was detained by the Philippines' National Bureau of Investigation and was charged with multiple counts of murder after having been arrested on December 1, 2009.

In 2011, Ampatuan pleaded not guilty in court to charges of having overseen the massacre.

Before the court case concluded, Ampatuan died on July 17, 2015, in Quezon City after falling into a coma caused by a heart attack.

In 2019 Ampatuan's sons Zaldy, Andal Jr., and Anwar Sr., as well as other relatives and accomplices, were convicted of 57 counts of murder.
