= Andal Ampatuan Jr. =

Filipino former politician convicted for the Maguindanao massacre

Mayor of Datu Unsay
- In office June 30, 2007 – June 30, 2010

Personal details
- Born: August 15, 1976 (age 50) Cotabato City, Philippines
- Party: Independent (2009–present); Lakas–Kampi–CMD (1993–2009)
- Spouse(s): Bai Reshal Santiago (d. 2018); Shahira
- Relations: Zaldy Ampatuan (brother)
- Children: 6
- Parent: Andal Ampatuan Sr. (father)
- Occupation: Politician
- Nickname: Datu Unsay
- Criminal information
- Status: Convicted; currently incarcerated at New Bilibid Prison
- Convictions: 58 counts of murder 21 counts of violations of the Anti-Graft and Corrupt Practices Act
- Penalty: Reclusion perpetua (40 years imprisonment) and ₱155.6 million in damages 210 years in imprisonment and ₱44.183 million in civil liability

Andal Uy Ampatuan Jr. (born August 15, 1976) is a Filipino convicted mass murderer and former politician. He is one of the main perpetrators of the Maguindanao massacre along with his father, brothers, and nephews. At the time of the massacre, he was the outgoing mayor of Datu Unsay, Maguindanao, and was planning to run for provincial governor, the position his father, Andal Sr., was set to vacate. Esmael Mangudadatu, from a rival political clan, declared his candidacy for the 2010 gubernatorial elections, thus challenging Ampatuan for the post. The Ampatuans carried out the massacre to kill Mangudadatu.

On December 19, 2019, Andal Ampatuan Jr., alongside his brother Zaldy and other co-accused, were convicted of 57 counts of murder and sentenced to reclusión perpetua.

== Role in the 2009 Maguindanao massacre ==
Ampatuan came to international attention in November 2009 as a result of the Maguindanao massacre. He was planning to run for governor of the province against Esmael Mangudadatu in the 2010 elections. However, Mangudadatu's female relatives and a group of journalists were ambushed and killed in the massacre, and Ampatuan quickly became the prime suspect. A member of the ruling Lakas–Kampi–CMD party, he and his father and brother were expelled by party chairman Gilberto Teodoro due to the massacre. He surrendered to Filipino authorities and was charged with murder. He denied any involvement, though several witnesses have gone on record stating that they saw him at the scene of the crime. In September 2010 he went on trial as the prime suspect in the massacre. Ampatuan, through his emissaries, was already under fire for bribing the relatives of the massacre.

== Graft case ==
In 2018, the Office of the Ombudsman filed graft charges over a ₱238.3-million fuel supply deal during the term of late provincial governor Andal Sr.

On November 23, 2023 (coinciding with the 14th anniversary of the massacre), the Sandiganbayan Sixth Division convicted Andal Jr. of 21 counts of violating the Anti-Graft and Corrupt Practices Act, sentenced him to between 127 years, 9 months to 210 years in prison in total, and ordered him to pay ₱44.183 million in civil liability to the Maguindanao provincial government. He is perpetually disqualified from holding public office. The verdict was related to the undelivered fuel supply to the provincial government from a Petron station in Shariff Aguak, where he was the owner.

Three co-accused were also convicted—two of falsification of public documents, another in connection with the provincial government's purchase of lumber, though the latter was reported already dead. The cases for three other individuals, one of them also accused over the purchase of lumber and reported dead, were temporarily archived as they remain at-large.

Court records show that in 2008, Andal Jr., along with his father Andal Sr. and several government officials, reportedly conspired to award the contract for the purchase of diesel fuel to the petroleum station without any bidding; and in releasing public funds despite failure of the station to completely deliver fuel products that were supposed to be used in road rehabilitation projects, which were certified finished by the provincial government but were later found by the Commission on Audit otherwise.

== Personal life ==
Andal Jr. is the eighth of the eleven children of Andal Ampatuan Sr. with his first wife Bai Laila Uy-Ampatuan. Zaldy is his full brother. He has more than thirty other siblings through his father's five other wives.

Andal Jr.'s first wife, Reshal Santiago Ampatuan, served as mayor of Datu Unsay until her death due to cardiac arrest in 2018; she was 38. The couple had six children.

Their son, Andal V (nicknamed "Datu Aguak", the second of the six siblings), garnered the highest number of votes in the 2019 Datu Unsay municipal council elections. In July that year, the town's mayor and vice mayor resigned, citing "lack of capability to govern". In accordance with the Local Government Code, Andal V became the town's new mayor. The new vice mayor is also a relative of theirs: Janine Ampatuan Mamalapat.

Ampatuan has a second wife named Shahira.

Ampatuan declared his 2008 net worth as ₱39.3 million, making him the richest in his family. He had 16 properties in Davao City with a total market value of ₱11.22 million.
