= Zaldy Ampatuan =

Filipino mass murderer and former politician

5th Governor of the Autonomous Region in Muslim Mindanao
- In office September 30, 2005 – November 25, 2009
- Vice Governor: Ansaruddin Alonto Adiong
- Preceded by: Parouk Hussin
- Succeeded by: Ansaruddin Alonto Adiong (Acting); Mujiv Hataman

Member of the ARMM Regional Legislative Assembly from Maguindanao's 2nd congressional district
- In office October 1, 1993 – March 31, 1998

Personal details
- Born: Zaldy Uy Ampatuan; August 22, 1967 (age 59)
- Party: Lakas–CMD/Lakas–Kampi–CMD (until 2009)
- Spouse: Johaira Midtimbang
- Children: 4
- Parent: Andal Ampatuan Sr. (father)
- Relatives: Andal Ampatuan Jr. (brother)
- Known for: One of the perpetrators of the Maguindanao massacre
- Nickname: Datu Puti
- Criminal information
- Status: Currently incarcerated at New Bilibid Prison
- Convictions: 58 counts of murder
- Penalty: Reclusion perpetua (40 years imprisonment) and ₱155.6 million in damages

Zaldy Uy Ampatuan (born August 22, 1967) is a Filipino convicted mass murderer and former politician. He is one of the main perpetrators of the Maguindanao massacre along with his father, brothers, and nephews. He served as governor of the Autonomous Region in Muslim Mindanao (ARMM) from 2005 until his suspension in 2009 due to his role in the massacre. He was a member of the ARMM Legislative Assembly from 1993 to 1998.

As one of the sons of Andal Ampatuan Sr., he is part of a powerful political dynasty based in Maguindanao.

== Maguindanao massacre ==
Zaldy Ampatuan began his term as ARMM governor on September 30, 2005. Zaldy was expelled from office when his brother, Andal Ampatuan Jr., was accused of carrying out the Maguindanao massacre of 2009. He was arrested in the province of Maguindanao and held by the Philippine military on charges of rebellion, but in April 2010 the Department of Justice decided to drop all murder charges against him, citing lack of evidence. However, in May 2010, Justice Secretary Alberto Agra reversed the ruling and restored the murder charges against Ampatuan due to new evidence.

On December 19, 2019, Ampatuan brothers Zaldy, Andal Jr., and Anwar Sr., as well as their other relatives and accomplices, were convicted of 57 counts of murder. Judge Jocelyn Solis-Reyes of the Quezon City Regional Trial Court sentenced them to reclusion perpetua (20 to 40 years imprisonment) without eligibility for parole. The Ampatuans will serve 30 years in prison since their 10-year detention will be credited to their sentences. They will serve their sentence in New Bilibid Prison. The convicts were also ordered to pay ₱155.6 million in damages to the heirs of their victims.
