= Oust Duterte matrix =

Diagram of alleged political ousters

The Oust Duterte matrix was a diagram released on April 22, 2019, after the Ang Totoong Narcolist YouTube channel controversy, where the channel speculated about the involvement of Duterte in drug syndicates. The diagram, released by the Office of the President, claimed to reveal links between journalists and organizations with plans to oust President Rodrigo Duterte. It was officially released by Presidential Spokesperson Salvador Panelo, who said that it underwent "proper validation." The matrix named journalists from multiple news websites, including the Philippine Center for Investigative Journalism and Rappler. Another version was released on May 8 along with a Microsoft PowerPoint presentation. People who were included in the matrix denied they had plans to oust Duterte. Following the release of the matrix, one of the groups sought government protection from harassment, while a newspaper editor resigned.

== Background ==
In an interview with Rappler in late 2015, Duterte announced his candidacy for president in the 2016 Philippine presidential election. He filed his Certificate of Candidacy (COC) for the elections a few days later, withdrawing from the mayoral race of Davao City. After intense competition, he won with more than 16.6 million votes. His presidency was controversial, marked by an intensive crackdown on illegal drugs. In his first 100 days, the Philippine National Police (PNP) killed approximately 3,600 people, with thousands of raids conducted. Because of this, he was criticized by the United Nations, the European Union, and other organizations. An ouster plot was announced by Duterte on September 8, 2018. It was allegedly planned by the Communist Party of the Philippines, which had previously assisted Duterte in the formation of his cabinet in 2016. After the announcement, the alleged plot "fell apart," according to politician Delfin Lorenzana. A YouTube channel, named "Ang Totoong Narcolist", was created in April 2019, alleging the involvement of Duterte in drug syndicates. Because of the videos, the alleged perpetrator and Senator Antonio Trillanes were charged with sedition, with the latter cleared of charges a year later.

== Release and aftermath ==
Presidential Spokesperson Salvador Panelo holding a copy of the matrix

After the "Ang Totoong Narcolist" YouTube channel caused controversy, a matrix was announced by presidential spokesperson Salvador Panelo on April 22. Malacañang Palace, the office of the President of the Philippines, was scheduled to publish the diagram officially, but The Manila Times beat them to it, prompting Panelo to question how the newspaper obtained it early. The matrix contained the names of journalists and organizations who allegedly want to oust Duterte, with journalists from the Philippine Center for Investigative Journalism (PCIJ) and Rappler. Panelo said that there was a "basis to release it" and that the matrix underwent "proper validation," stating that "the President has so many sources, so he got the matrix from one of his sources." He also shared the possibility of the journalists "feeding their stories to the enemies of the state." Another version of the matrix was released on May 8, with a Microsoft PowerPoint presentation to support the claims. The other version included "active online collaboration" between former presidential spokesperson Edwin Lacierda and other people, journalist Ellen Tordesillas being part of "controversy" along with the Liberal Party and the Magdalo Party-List, and other alleged links.

Filipino Olympian Hidilyn Diaz was "shocked" over her inclusion in the matrix. In a post shared on May 8, Diaz joked about her inclusion. Maria Ressa, the CEO of Rappler, who was included in the matrix, said that it was "garbage" and a "Palace ploy to harass journalists." Ellen Tordesillas, an editor of Vera Files, which was also included in the matrix, denied the allegations, stating that it was "downright false." The PCIJ said the report was "wrong on many points," saying that they have never received an email from Tordesillas about the YouTube channel. The rest of Rappler said that the report was an example of "how not to write an investigative report or even straight news." A former member of the National Union of Peoples' Lawyers, Inday Espina-Varona, and a former member of Vera Files, Luz Rumban, both said that they left their respective companies, with Rumban leaving in 2018. Magdalo Party-List Representative and opposition member Gary Alejano branded the matrix as "utterly irresponsible" in a press briefing on April 22, demanding Panelo and Duterte resign over it. Numerous groups labeled the matrix as "ludicrous" and "dangerous". Netizens mocked the creation of the matrix, stating that it lacked information. Some netizens made their own versions of the matrix with Marvel heroes and cockroaches.

Members of the National Union of Peoples' Lawyers were harassed for their security and safety. Through the union, they submitted an eight-page manifestation detailing this harassment to the Supreme Court of the Philippines and asked for government protection. An editor for The Manila Times resigned on April 26 because the first article was "poorly sourced." In an interview, the editor was allegedly asked to resign from the newspaper. He said that it could have been written in a journalistic manner but appeared to be "an opinion piece". According to opposition members, the matrix attempted to distract citizens from the upcoming 2019 Philippine general election and allegedly attempted to "cripple the nation's democracy". According to multiple groups, the matrix proved that the Duterte administration purposely shamed administration critics by alleging them to be government destabilizers.

== See also ==
- Dennis Jose Borbon
- Red October (ouster plot)
- Alleged ouster plots against Rodrigo Duterte
