= Alleged ouster plots against Rodrigo Duterte =

Allegations made by the Philippine government

Since the win of President Rodrigo Duterte in the 2016 Philippine presidential election, his presidency has been marked with controversy due to his crackdown on drugs and conflicts with organizations. Because of this, two attempts were allegedly made to oust him, namely the Red October plot and the Ang Totoong Narcolist videos. In response to the Ang Totoong Narcolist, a matrix was made allegedly listing the figures wanting to oust Duterte.

The Red October plot was an alleged plot reportedly uncovered by Duterte on September 8, 2018. The numerous oppositions targeted said that the plot was fake. A Chinese person was arrested on September 27 in Teresa, Rizal, while schools were targeted for alleged participation in the plot. Next year, a former member of a drug syndicate created a YouTube channel named "Ang Totoong Narcolist" and uploaded five videos criticizing Duterte and his allies. The videos caused major controversy, leading the member of the drug syndicate and an opposition politician to be charged with sedition.

Shortly after the YouTube channel made controversy, the Oust Duterte matrix was revealed by Presidential Spokesperson Salvador Panelo, targeting politicians and journalists who allegedly took part in an "ouster plot" against Duterte. Numerous figures included in the matrix denied their participation.

== Background ==
In an interview with Rappler in the late months of 2015, Duterte announced his candidacy for president in the upcoming 2016 Philippine presidential election. He filed his Certificate of Candidacy for the presidential election a few days later, withdrawing from the mayoral race of Davao City. After intense competition, he won with a total vote count of 16.6 million. His presidency was controversial, with his presidency marked by an intensive crackdown on illegal drugs. In his first 100 days, the Philippine National Police (PNP) killed approximately 3,600 people while carrying out thousands of raids. Because of this, he was involved in controversy against the United Nations, the European Union, and other organizations.

== "Red October" plot ==
In Davao City, Duterte accused the opposition of creating an ouster plot on September 8, 2018, with opposition stating that he was a victim of his own "paranoia". A protest was planned during this time, but nothing happened in the supposed protest areas. Duterte accused soldiers of holding discussions with rebel groups like the Communist Party of the Philippines (CPP) and the New People's Army to oust him from office on September 24 in a military camp in Jolo, Sulu. The plot was allegedly named "Red October". The Malacañang Palace, the workplace of the president, released a video of his statement the next day. The day after that, the CPP said that the ouster plot was fake. Vice President Leni Robredo stated that linking political opposition to ouster plots was a tactic used in martial law to silence the opposition. Senator Antonio Trillanes denied his involvement in the ouster plot. Four days later, the military seized from 13 alleged members of the CPP which had laptops and documents that Gen. Antonio Parlade Jr. alleged to be proof of the ouster plot. The Makabayan denied their involvement on September 27, although they were planning for a protest rally the next month.

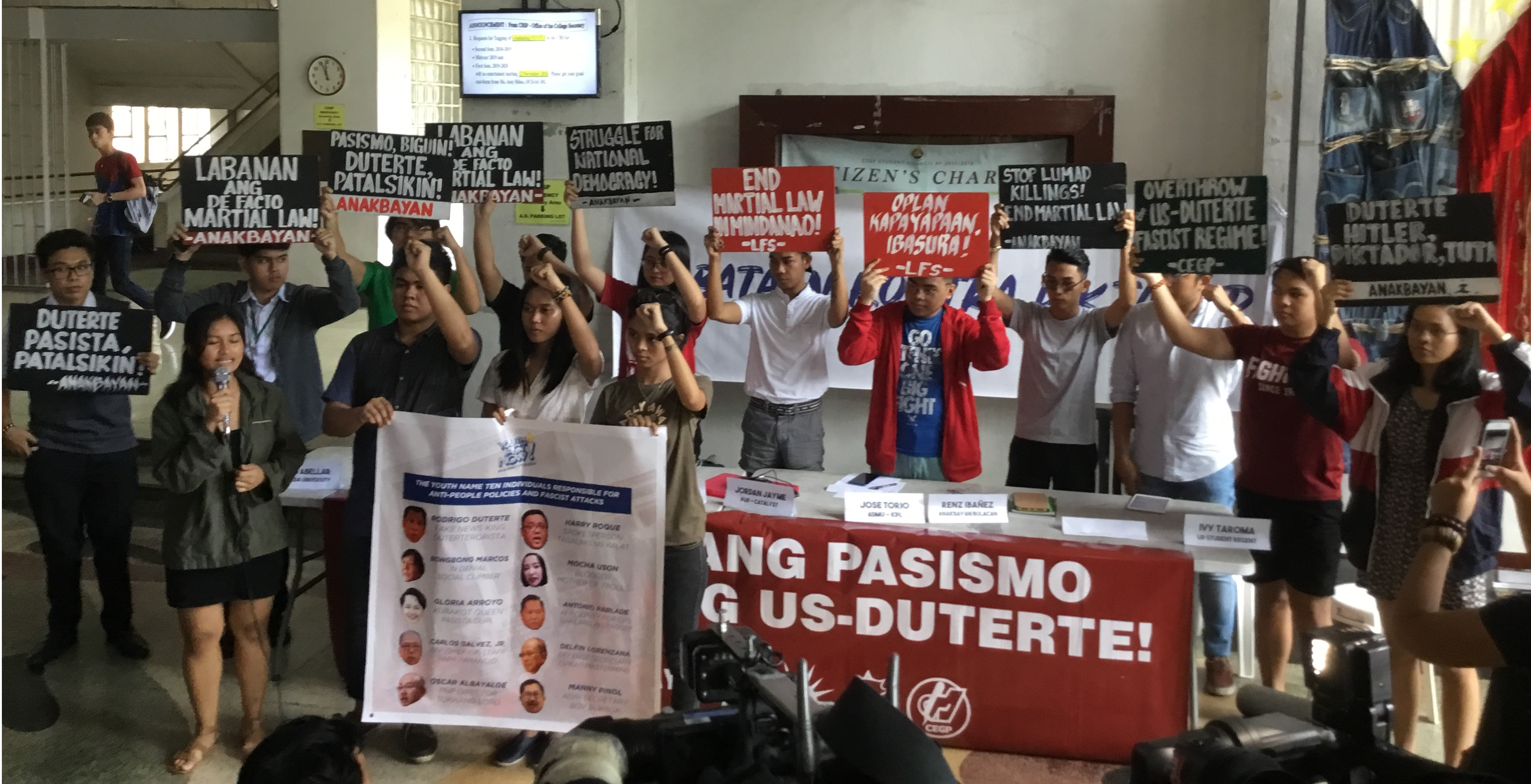
Youth activists denouncing Armed Forces of the Philippines (AFP) terror tag and Red October plot, October 2018.

A Chinese person was arrested on September 27 in Teresa, Rizal. The PNP raided her house and found firearms. Her house was allegedly used as a hideout for communist guerillas. Some allegations were made that, during the arrest, the national bribed the officers with "protection money" so that she would not be arrested. A list of schools across Metro Manila which were allegedly involved in the plot was released on October 4 by the AFP, with the military stating that the CPP was trying to "brainwash the students" into taking part in the activities. Among the list provided were the University of the Philippines Diliman, the Ateneo de Manila University, the De La Salle University, and the University of Santo Tomas. The Department of Transportation said on October 7 that transport strikes were related to the plot. Department of Defense Secretary Delfin Lorenzana said on October 12 that the plot fell apart. The military said that the plot would be moved to December, the 50th founding anniversary of CPP, although CPP President Jose Maria Sison denied these claims. The same month, nine farmers were killed in the Sagay massacre, which authorities claimed was related to the plot.

== "Bikoy" videos ==
Peter Joemel Advincula was born on March 22, 1989, in Donsol, Sorsogon. His mother was a parish secretary while his father was a farmer. He pursued a degree in philosophy. His father died in 2009. On May 6 that same year, he was introduced to a drug syndicate operating out of Misibis Bay. He was tasked to prepare the monthly "TARA", a document listing the collections and payoffs that month. He was convicted of fraud in 2012 and sentenced to six years in prison. He was released in 2017, one year early because of good character. Wanting to become a whistleblower, he created a YouTube channel named "Ang Totoong Narcolist" (transl. The True Narcolist) based around a former criminal named "Bikoy". Five videos were created in total, between April 2, 2019, and Advincula's surrender on May 6. The videos accused Duterte-aligned figures, including Waldo Carpio, the brother of Sara Duterte's husband, Mans Carpio, Honeylet Avanceña and her daughter Kitty Duterte, and Bong Go. Duterte-aligned politicians including Presidential Spokesperson Salvador Panelo and Bong Go called the allegations false. Senator Antonio Trillanes supported the videos. The Liberal Party of the Philippines, a part of the opposition, denied their involvement in the videos.

The DOJ started investigating the videos on April 17. Blogger Rodel Jayme was arrested in his residence in Parañaque on April 30 for his alleged involvement in the videos. Jayme was charged with sedition on May 2. Peter Advincula, the original 'Bikoy', surfaced on May 6. He asked for help from the Integrated Bar of the Philippines (IBP) to sue the Dutertes and their allies. The IBP rejected his offer. Advincula surrendered to police on May 23, stating that he played a role in a script made by the Liberal Party. The Philippine National Police (PNP) started an investigation against Advincula on May 27. He turned himself in to the police for protection on June 3, suspecting that his life is in danger. The DOJ charged him with fraud. He was released from protective custody on June 25. Politicians were sued for sedition on July 18, including Vice President Leni Robredo. Investigations were made into Robredo and other politicians' relation to the Bikoy videos. Advincula surrendered again to PNP on July 29. He posted the bail of 10,000 PHP on July 31, getting released. Robredo responded to the investigation with a counter-affidavit, denying the accusations on August 29. On February 10, 2020, Robredo was cleared of her accusations while Antonio Trillanes was charged with sedition.

On January 20, 2021, Advincula was charged with perjury by a Manila court for allegedly false statements against the Free Legal Assistance Group, surrendering in a local police station in Daraga, posting a 18,000 PHP bail. He allegedly killed three politicians in Albay months later on November 13, with their bodies appearing in his ukay-ukay store in Daraga. He was declared the primary suspect. He posted the 1 million PHP bail on December 16. In 2024, he filed his candidacy for senator in the 2025 election but was declared a nuisance candidate by the Commission on Elections.

== "Oust Duterte" matrix ==
After the "Ang Totoong Narcolist" YouTube channel caused controversy, a matrix was announced by Presidential Spokesperson Salvador Panelo on April 22. 2019. The matrix allegedly contained the names of journalists and organizations who want to oust Duterte, with journalists from the Philippine Center for Investigative Journalism (PCIJ) and Rappler. Panelo said that there was a "basis to release it" and that the matrix underwent "proper validation". Another version of the matrix was released on May 8, with a Microsoft PowerPoint presentation to support the claims. The other version included "active online collaboration" between multiple opposition figures. Filipino Olympian Hidilyn Diaz was "shocked" over her inclusion in the matrix. Multiple major journalists claimed the matrix as "false". The PCIJ said the report was "wrong on many points". Rappler said that the report was an example of "how not to write an investigative report or even straight news." Former journalists included in the matrix told the media about their inclusion. The National Union of Peoples' Lawyers asked the Supreme Court of the Philippines for government protection after harassment related to their involvement in the matrix. An editor for The Manila Times resigned on April 26 because the early article was "poorly sourced", later stating in an interview that he was asked to resign from the newspaper.

== Other alleged plots ==
A media report released on December 29, 2016, stated that ambassadors from the United States wanted to destabilize Duterte's government. In response to this, Duterte called the ambassadors "spies", although the United States government responded to the allegations as false. Paolo Duterte released a list on December 10, 2018, which contained people who allegedly wanted to oust Duterte including Vice President Leni Robredo, former government officials, and journalists. The Malacañang Palace defended Duterte's list stating that there is no need to probe it. The list was eventually deleted. During the 72nd anniversary of the Philippine Air Force, Duterte pleaded for the military not to oust him. "I know that the Armed Forces and the Police will have to decide one day somehow. Do not do it please during my term," Duterte said.

== See also ==
- Efforts to impeach Rodrigo Duterte
- Dennis Jose Borbon
- Philippine drug war
