= Ang Totoong Narcolist =

2019 Philippine political controversy

"Ang Totoong Narcolist" (transl. The True Narcolist) was a YouTube channel created on April 2, 2019, that published videos alleging the involvement of the family of former Philippine president Rodrigo Duterte in drug syndicates. It accused politicians Bong Go, a senator and ally of the Duterte family, and Paolo Duterte of participation in those syndicates. The channel was created by Peter Advincula, a former syndicate member who was charged with fraud in 2012 and imprisoned before being released in 2017. The videos led to a manhunt for the channel's creator led by the National Bureau of Investigation. Rodel Jayme, the owner of a website that distributed the videos, was arrested on April 30. Advincula surrendered to the police before charges were filed against Jayme. He was charged with six counts of estafa while investigations into Advincula and the channel were conducted. Several politicians were charged with sedition, including Vice President Leni Robredo, who was later cleared, and Senator Antonio Trillanes. Over the following years, Advincula faced additional charges in other cases and attempted to run in the 2025 Philippine Senate election.

== Background ==
=== Perpetrator ===
Peter Joemel Advincula was born in 1989, in Donsol, Sorsogon, Philippines. He was allegedly introduced to a drug syndicate operating in Misibis Bay on May 6, 2010, and was purportedly selected to head closed-circuit television operations in underground facilities throughout the area and allegedly tasked with preparing the monthly "TARA", a document listing the collections and payoffs that month. During this time, Advincula allegedly witnessed the killing of one of his syndicate members, as well as the rape of their wife and daughter.

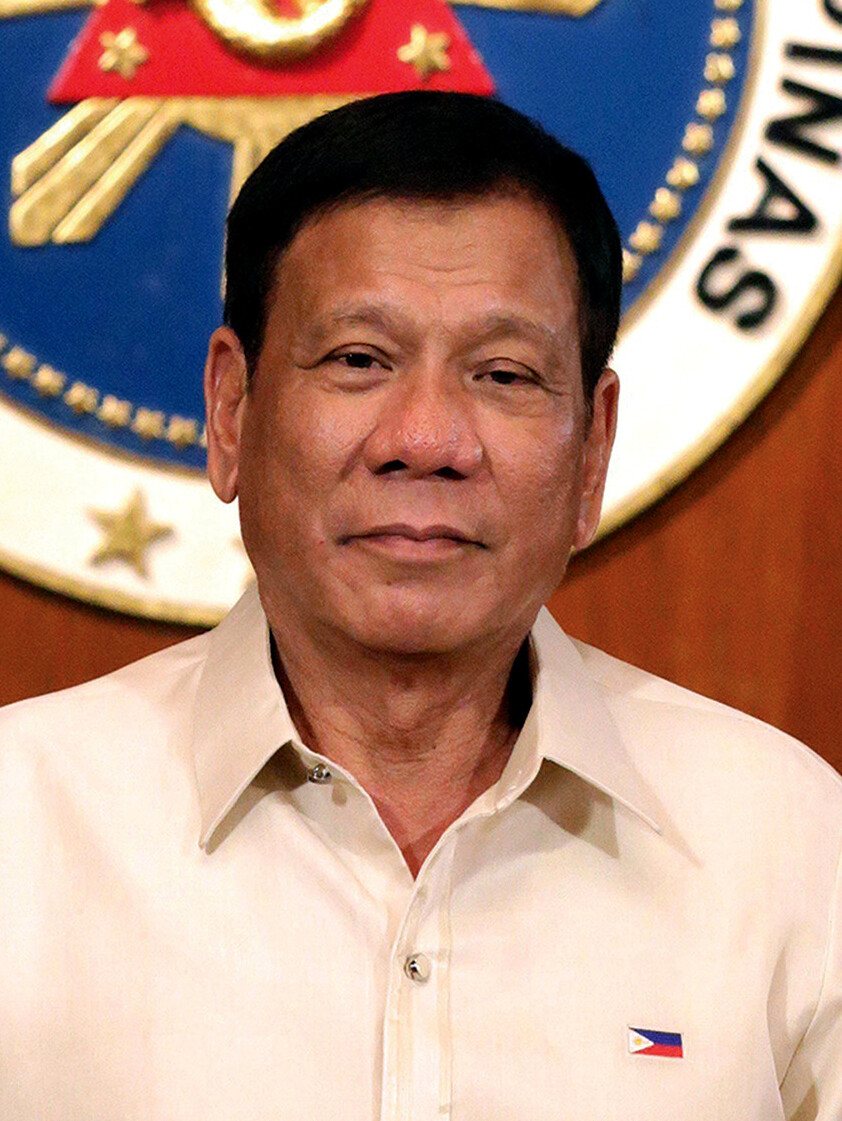
A portrait of President Rodrigo Duterte

Advincula fled the syndicate fearing that he would be murdered. National Bureau of Investigation (NBI) agents found Advincula. He was convicted of fraud in 2012 and sentenced to six years in prison. During the first three years, he was detained at the Naga City District Jail. He was transferred to the New Bilibid Prison due to good behavior. In prison, he returned to his religious activities, serving as a "teacher" for the local detainees. Allegedly, during his detainment, he contacted the office of Senator Tito Sotto. He attempted to expose the businessmen who connected him to the drug syndicate to leave the prison. Sotto did not reply, finding his claims "suspicious." He was released in 2017, one year early due to good character.

=== Duterte administration ===
Rodrigo Duterte won the 2016 Philippine presidential election and assumed presidency on June 30. His presidency was marked by a controversial and intensive crackdown on illegal drugs, causing large protests to be held against the Duterte administration. In March 2019, Duterte publicly named 46 politicians he alleged had connections to drug syndicates, naming them "Narcolists". Along with this, various disinformation campaigns were created leading up to the 2019 Philippine general election. Surigao del Norte Representative Ace Barbers portrayed these scandals as a possible motive for the creation of the videos.

== Videos ==
In August 2018, Advincula planned to go into hiding, wanting to expose the alleged operations in the syndicate. He created a YouTube channel named "Ang Totoong Narcolist" (transl. The True Narcolist) on April 2, 2019. The videos featured a hooded whistleblower named "Bikoy", who claimed to be a former member of drug syndicates in Southern Luzon and the Visayas archipelago. According to Vera Files, the videos aappeared to be professionally produced and well-annotated. Five videos were created, between April 2 and Advincula's surrender on May 6. The videos were widely circulated throughout social media.

The first episode was released on April 2. It displayed papers that "Bikoy" claimed to be TARA documents related to the syndicate. According to "Bikoy", typical TARA documents contain a date, a code name and bank account of a high-ranking official. The bottom of the documents had a signature which ensured that the details in the documents were accurate. "Bikoy" then presented two code names, describing the code names as poorly disguised due to their resemblance to the individuals' real names. He claimed the first code name was associated with Waldo Carpio, the brother of the President's son-in-law. He then said that the other code name belonged to Paolo Duterte, alleging that the latter had a tattoo on his back showing the code name. The second episode was released five days later. In the episode, "Bikoy" stated that Elijah Manuel Pepito, the partner lawyer for Mans Carpio's law firm, was used as a "dummy" to hide the alleged money of Honeylet Avanceña, Duterte's wife Kitty, their daughter, purportedly sourced from the drug trade.

The third episode was released on April 8, the following day, on YouTube. It discussed the alleged involvement of Senator Bong Go in the drug trade. "Bikoy" claimed that drug money was being funneled to Go's account and insisted that Go had a dragon tattoo on his back with his code name. The fourth episode was released on April 12, four days later. In the video, "Bikoy" further argued that Go had a dragon tattoo and stated that he was confident of his allegation; he showed a picture of Go playing basketball with a portion of the dragon tattoo visible. He reiterated that Carpio was involved in drug operations. The fifth and final video was released on April 22. In it, "Bikoy" revealed alleged organizations related to the Misibis Bay syndicate and identified personalities he claimed were involved. He also exhibited the "Quadrangle Group", an alleged group of rich businessmen purportedly involved in drug operations.

== Reaction ==
Numerous Duterte-aligned politicians opposed the videos. During the episodes' release, Presidential Spokesperson Salvador Panelo said that the allegations mentioned were "black propaganda". He also accused the Liberal Party of the Philippines of creating the videos. After the first video, President Duterte blamed the political opposition and hinted that Senator Antonio Trillanes was likely behind it, calling him a person who acts "tough" but is actually "gay". Due to Advincula's allegations that Bong Go has a dragon tattoo, Go has shown his back on two occasions: at a Hugpong ng Pagbabago campaign event and later at a Luntiang Pilipinas campaign event in Calamba, Laguna. Trillanes praised the videos, wishing to have been part of the creation. He then challenged Paolo Duterte to display the tattoo on his back, which Duterte refused to do. The Liberal Party denied their involvement while Communist Party of the Philippines founder Jose Maria Sison said "Bikoy" should be given protection to tell his story. The Department of Justice of the Philippines (DOJ) questioned "Bikoy"'s credibility due to his anonymity. According to the Philippine News Agency, the videos were "publicly viewed, shared and uploaded" multiple times.

=== Oust Duterte matrix ===
Shortly after the release of the videos, specifically on April 16, Duterte reported in a speech that he had received intelligence reports detailing an alleged ouster plot. Six days later, Panelo released the "Oust Duterte matrix". The matrix named journalists from several news outlets, particularly the Philippine Center for Investigative Journalism and Rappler. Panelo said those journalists could be feeding their stories to "enemies of the state," or the opposition. He stated that the matrix was released to expose those behind the alleged ouster plot and did not file charges against the journalists shown in the matrix.

== Manhunt and investigation ==
=== Advincula's arrest and investigation ===
Before Jayme was to be charged, Peter Advincula, the original "Bikoy", surfaced. He requested help from the Integrated Bar of the Philippines (IBP) in suing the Dutertes and their allies, saying his allegations were true. Two days later, the IBP rejected his offer. He then asked Senator Panfilo Lacson to postpone his hearing until the elections. That same day, Guevarra gave Advincula an ultimatum: bring evidence to back up his claims in the videos, or face sedition charges. Advincula surrendered to police May 22, stating on national television that he played a role in a script made by the Liberal Party. The media called this reversal "flip-flopping". He accused Trillanes of taking part in the video's production. The DOJ said that his allegations would need a deep investigation. Solicitor General Jose Calida offered legal aid to Advincula. Advincula's mugshot was taken on May 23. Elizaldy Co, one of the people mentioned in the videos, filed a PHP 1 billion lawsuit for damages from the accusations relating to him.

The next day, Advincula, charged for six counts of estafa, paid PHP 6,000 in bail. The next day, he left Camp Crame, where he was detained. The Philippine National Police (PNP) started an investigation against Advincula, who had skipped a case hearing on the investigation the following day. He turned himself in to the police for protection on June 3, claiming that his life was in danger. The next day, the DOJ concluded their investigation, charging him with fraud. Advincula was released from protective custody on June 25. Advincula surrendered again to the PNP July 29. He posted PHP 10,000 bail two days later and then applied for state protection on August 5 with his lawyer Larry Gadon. On August 20, Calida linked the videos to servers in the Ateneo de Manila University.

=== Rodel Jayme's arrest and lawsuits ===
The DOJ began investigating the videos on April 17. The cybercrime division of the National Bureau of Investigation (NBI) said that the website "metrobalita.net", a page that shared the videos, was owned by blogger Rodel Jayme. He was arrested in his residence in Parañaque April 30 and detained in NBI headquarters. Jayme was then charged with sedition on May 2, with DOJ Secretary Menardo Guevarra saying he could also be charged with child abuse for mentioning Duterte's daughter in one of the videos. Jayme accused opposition groups of forcing him to create the websites. An NBI spokesperson said that Jayme could be a state witness for the accusations.

Numerous politicians were sued for sedition on July 18, including Vice President Leni Robredo. Investigations began into his and other politicians' connection to the "Bikoy" videos. Two Catholic bishops were charged with sedition later that month due to an alleged conversation with Advincula. Robredo responded to the investigations with a counter-affidavit, denying the accusations on August 29. In September, a former lawyer of Trillanes stated that the senator had ties to "Bikoy"; the senator denied the accusation. On February 10, 2020, Robredo was cleared of the charges against her, while Antonio Trillanes and actor Joel Saracho, among others, were charged with sedition.

== Aftermath ==
On January 20, 2021, Advincula was charged with perjury by a Manila court for allegedly false statements against the Free Legal Assistance Group. A warrant was issued for his arrest. He surrendered at a local police station in Daraga, posting PHP 18,000 bail. He was absent from the court on July 21, causing the court to reissue his arrest warrant due to Advincula being unable to justify his absence. Advincula allegedly killed three politicians in Albay on November 13, with their bodies appearing in his ukay-ukay store in Daraga. He was declared the primary suspect. According to local police, his possible motive was a grudge between him and one of the victims after they rejected Advincula's request for a loan. He posted the 1 million PHP bail on December 16. Two years later, he was convicted of perjury in statements he made in 2019 implicating lawyers Erin Tañada, Chel Diokno, and Theodore Te in an ouster plot. He was sentenced to a maximum of one year and one day in prison, but eventually posted bail soon after the verdict. In 2020, a journal released by the Ateneo de Manila University detailed the videos and the effects. On October 8, 2024, Advincula filed his candidacy for senator in the 2025 election, but he was declared a nuisance candidate by the Commission on Elections. Ako Bicol Representative Alfredo Garbin filed a resolution on May 29 for the Philippine House Committee on Information and Communications Technology to investigate the potential effects of misinformation on social media platforms due to the videos. The resolution resulted in investigations against Facebook and Google and a request for both to attend a hearing. Senator Panfilo Lacson viewed the controversy as an "election issue".

== See also ==
- Dennis Jose Borbon
- Alleged ouster plots against Rodrigo Duterte
- Red October (ouster plot)
