= Starmobile Up Snap =

Android smartphone from Starmobile

- Brand: Starmobile
- Manufacturer: Starmobile
- Type: Smartphone
- Series: Up series
- First released: November 20, 2014 (announcement) December 2014 (release)
- Discontinued: Yes
- Predecessor: Starmobile UP
- Compatible networks: GSM, HSPA+
- Form factor: Slate
- Colors: Blue; White; Black
- Dimensions: 147.00×73.00×9.50 mm (5.787×2.874×0.374 in)
- Operating system: Android 4.4 (KitKat)
- System-on-chip: Broadcom BCM23550M
- CPU: Quad-core 1.2 GHz ARM Cortex-A7
- GPU: VideoCore IV
- Memory: 1 GB RAM
- Storage: 8 GB
- Removable storage: microSD (up to 32 GB)
- SIM: Dual SIM
- Battery: 2,900 mAh Li-Ion
- Rear camera: 8 MP, autofocus, LED flash (UltraPixel sensor)
- Front camera: 5 MP, autofocus
- Display: 5.0 in (130 mm) IPS LCD; 480 x 854 pixels (~196 ppi density)

The Starmobile Up Snap is an Android smartphone designed and marketed by the Filipino tech company Starmobile, announced on November 20, 2014, at the Makati Shangri-la, Rizal Ballroom and launched in the Philippines in late 2014.

== Specifications ==
=== Design ===
The Starmobile Up Snap features a rectangular form factor with physical dimensions measuring 147 mm in height, 73 mm in width, and a profile thickness of 9.5 mm. It utilizes a scratch-resistant glass front pane protecting the screen assembly while the rear shell houses the main camera lens and LED flash module. The phone was made available to consumers in blue, white, and black color options.

=== Hardware ===
The device is powered by a 1.2 GHz quad-core Broadcom BCM23550M ARM Cortex-A7 central processing unit paired with a Broadcom VideoCore IV graphics processing unit.

The handset relies on a non-removable 2,900 mAh lithium-ion battery rated for up to 14.5 hours of continuous talk time and 580 hours of standby time.

Storage configurations consist of 1 GB of RAM alongside 8 GB of internal storage, which can be expanded externally up to 32 GB through a dedicated microSD card slot.

=== Display ===
The front face of the smartphone incorporates a 5-inch multi-touch In-Plane Switching (IPS) Liquid Crystal Display (LCD). This panel operates at an FWVGA resolution of 540 × 854 pixels. The spatial configuration of the display matrix translates to an approximate pixel density of 196 pixels per inch.

=== Camera ===
The rear panel mounts an 8-megapixel primary camera, which uses the same as the HTC One (M8), featuring an f/2.0 aperture lens, an integrated LED flash, and an UltraPixel sensor array, including a secondary 5-megapixel front-facing camera. The front camera module includes an active autofocus system.

=== Software ===
The handset ships out of the box running the Android 4.4.2 "KitKat" mobile operating system. Over the stock operating system layer, Starmobile loads proprietary software enhancements alongside regular system utilities like an FM radio tuner application.
