= Starmobile Diamond X1 =

Android smartphone manufactured by Starmobile

- Brand: Starmobile
- Manufacturer: Starmobile
- Type: Phablet
- Series: Diamond
- First released: January 2014
- Predecessor: Starmobile Diamond D1
- Related: Starmobile Octa
- Compatible networks: 3G, HSPA+
- Form factor: Slate
- Colors: Black/White (Brushed aluminum); Two-tone Black (Matte metallic)
- Dimensions: 7.50 mm thickness
- Operating system: Android 4.2.2 (Jelly Bean)
- System-on-chip: MediaTek MT6592
- CPU: 1.7 GHz Octa-core
- GPU: Mali-450MP4
- Memory: 2 GB RAM
- Storage: 8 GB
- Removable storage: microSD (up to 64 GB)
- SIM: Dual-SIM, dual standby
- Battery: Li-Ion 2,400 mAh
- Rear camera: 18 MP BSI, autofocus, LED flash
- Front camera: 8 MP BSI
- Display: 6.0 in (152 mm) IPS LCD; 1280 × 720 pixels, (~245 ppi density)
- Sound: Yamaha speakers

The Starmobile Diamond X1 is the first octa-core Android smartphone manufactured and marketed in the Philippines and released in January 2014 by Starmobile.

== Specifications ==
=== Design ===
The design of the Starmobile Diamond X1 features two distinct color variants, utilizing a polished metal frame, rounded corners, and a 2mm thin side bezel. One configuration pairs a black front panel with a white accents and a removable brushed aluminum rear cover, while the alternative version presents a uniform two-tone black finish paired with a matte metallic back panel. The front of the phone hosts three capacitive navigation buttons alongside sensors and the camera. Physical controls include a power button and a headset jack sitting at the top frame, with a dedicated volume rocker placed on the right side and a microUSB interface sitting at the bottom boundary.

=== Hardware ===
The device is powered by a MediaTek MT6592 system-on-chip that features a 1.7 GHz octa-core processor alongside a Mali-450MP4 graphics processing unit.

It comes built with 2 GB of RAM and 8 GB of internal flash storage, which can be expanded by up to an additional 64 GB via a dedicated microSD card slot. It relies on a removable 2,400 mAh lithium-ion battery, which provides roughly 6 hours of local video playback under testing conditions.

=== Audio ===
Unlike many contemporary smartphones that utilize generic loudspeakers, the Starmobile Diamond X1 features an audio system engineered by Yamaha, a Japanese manufacturer of audio equipment and musical instruments.

=== Display ===
The phablet is equipped with a large 6.0-inch IPS LCD panel sporting a High Definition resolution of 1280×720 pixels.

=== Cameras ===
The smartphone utilizes an 18-megapixel backside-illuminated (BSI) sensor complete with autofocus tracking and a single LED flash. The default camera application includes several specialized shooting presets such as High Dynamic Range (HDR) exposure, smile detection, multi-angle stitching, and built-in image filters. Video recording with the rear setup captures up to 720p resolution footage at a fluid 30 frames per second saved into a 3GP file format container. Facing forward, an 8-megapixel BSI sensor handles selfie photography and basic mobile video calling tasks.

=== Software ===
The handset ships out of the box running the Android 4.2.2 Jelly Bean mobile operating system natively. Starmobile layers a lightweight proprietary custom user interface on top of the base Android platform to keep animations and navigation transitions highly responsive. To minimize software bloat, third-party system applications are kept to a minimum, though it does feature select factory pre-loaded tools such as the Starmobile App Store and Starmobile Sync utilities alongside core social networking apps.
