= Red October (plot) =

Attempt to remove Philippine president Rodrigo Duterte

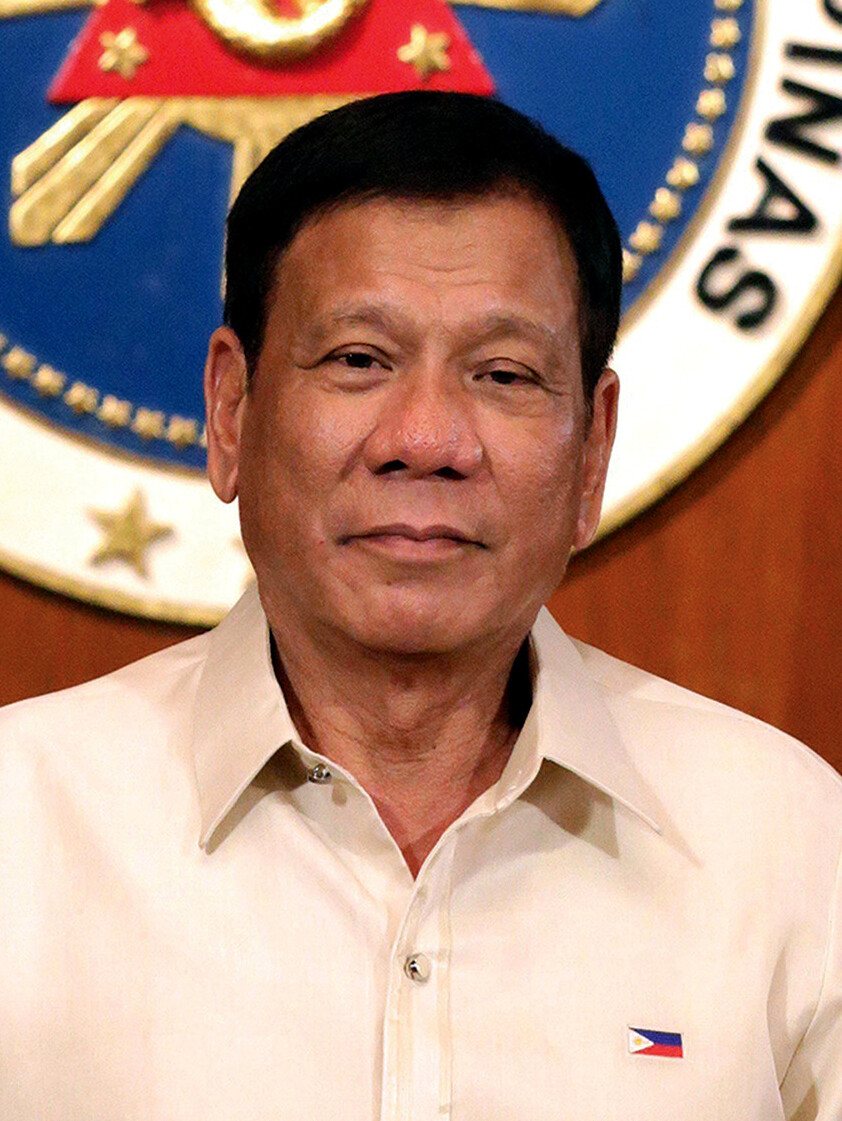
Presidential portrait of Rodrigo Duterte, the target of the Red October plot

Red October was an alleged ouster plot to remove Philippine President Rodrigo Duterte. After winning the 2016 Philippine presidential election, Duterte started a controversial anti-drug campaign. The Armed Forces of the Philippines (AFP) and Duterte revealed a reported ouster plot called "Red October" on September 24, 2018. Vice President Leni Robredo, Senator Antonio Trillanes, and the Makabayan bloc denied their involvement in the plot. Three days later, a Chinese national was arrested in relation to the plot. A list of schools allegedly involved in the plot was released on October 4 by the AFP. The military claimed that the plot would continue in December, though the claims were denied.

== Background ==
In an interview with Rappler in the late months of 2015, Duterte announced his candidacy for president in the upcoming 2016 Philippine presidential election. He filed his Certificate of Candidacy for the presidential election a few days later, withdrawing from the mayoral race of Davao City. After intense competition, he won with a total vote count of 16.6 million. His presidency was controversial and marked by an intensive crackdown on illegal drugs. In his first 100 days, the Philippine National Police (PNP) killed approximately 3,600 people. The government carried out thousands of raids. Because of this, he was involved in a conflict against the United Nations, the European Union, and other organizations.

== Discovery and reactions ==
On September 8, 2018, Duterte accused the opposition of plotting to oust him. Members of the opposition said that he was a victim of his own "paranoia". Two days later, reporters asked officials for more information about the alleged plot to no avail. The supposed plot was originally codenamed "Akalasan", according to PNP documentation. Small rallies were held on September 21, causing Metro Manila Police General Guillermo Eleazar to say that the protest areas were "peaceful". On September 24, in a military camp in Jolo, Sulu, Duterte accused soldiers of holding discussions with rebel groups like the Communist Party of the Philippines (CPP) and the New People's Army to remove him from office. The plot was allegedly named "Red October". The Malacañang Palace released a video of his statement the next day.

According to AFP Chief of Staff Carlito Galvez Jr., the plot aimed to politically trap Duterte into declaring martial law and a revolutionary government. The next day, the CPP said that the ouster plot was just a fabrication by the military. They said the aim of the government was to "target legitimate protest actions". Vice President Leni Robredo stated that "linking opposition groups to ouster plots was a tactic used in martial law to silence the opposition." Senator Antonio Trillanes denied his involvement in the ouster plot. Four days later, the AFP seized from 13 alleged members of the CPP laptops and documents that Gen. Antonio Parlade Jr. alleged to be proof of the ouster plot. The Makabayan also denied their involvement on September 27, although they were planning for a protest rally the next month. According to Silvestre Bello III, the Secretary of Labor and Employment, the plot was just "hearsay" because of the strong public support of Duterte.

== Investigation and aftermath ==
A Chinese person was arrested on September 27 in Taytay, Rizal. The PNP raided her house and found high-powered firearms. The police alleged that her house was possibly used as a hideout for communist guerillas. Some allegations were made that, during the arrest, the national bribed the officers with "protection money" so that she would not be arrested. A list of schools across Metro Manila which were allegedly involved in the plot was released on October 4 by the AFP, with The Philippine Star stating that the CPP was allegedly trying to "brainwash and incite students" into taking part in the activities. Among the list provided were the University of the Philippines Diliman, the Ateneo de Manila University, the De La Salle University, and the University of Santo Tomas. Anakbayan, a militant youth group, responded to the AFP stating that they were endangering the lives of students by disclosing the list. The Department of Transportation said on October 7 that transport strikes were related to the plot. Secretary of Defense Delfin Lorenzana said on October 12 that the plot fell apart. The military claimed instead that the plot would be carried out in December, timed to the 50th anniversary of the CPP, although CPP president Jose Maria Sison denied these claims. The same month, nine farmers were killed in the Sagay massacre, which authorities claimed was related to the plot.

== See also ==
- Dennis Jose Borbon
- Ang Totoong Narcolist
- Alleged ouster plots against Rodrigo Duterte
