= Starmobile Diamond =

Philippine smartphone

- Brand: Starmobile
- Developer: Starmobile
- Manufacturers: Star Telecom Alliance Resources, Inc.
- Type: Smartphone
- Series: Starmobile Diamond Series
- First released: April 13, 2013; 13 years ago
- Compatible networks: 2G GSM (900/1800MHz), 3G HSDPA (850/900/2100MHz)
- Form factor: Slate
- Colors: Black; White
- Dimensions: 148 mm (5.8 in) H 74.5 mm (2.93 in) W 9.2 mm (0.36 in) D
- Operating system: Android 4.1.1 "Jelly Bean"
- System-on-chip: MediaTek MT6577H
- CPU: 1.0 GHz dual-core ARM Cortex-A9
- GPU: PowerVR SGX531
- Memory: 1 GB RAM
- Storage: 4 GB
- Removable storage: microSD, up to 32 GB
- SIM: Dual SIM (Dual Standby)
- Battery: 2000 mAh Li-Ion
- Charging: microUSB 2.0
- Rear camera: 12 MP BSI, autofocus, dual LED flash
- Front camera: 3 MP BSI
- Display: 5.0 in (130 mm) IPS LCD, 1280×720 pixels (294 ppi), Dragontrail glass

The Starmobile Diamond is an Android phablet developed and manufactured by the Philippine mobile phone brand Starmobile. Released on April 13, 2013, the smartphone was part of the "Diamond" flagship series.

== Specifications ==
=== Hardware ===
The body is made of plastic with chrome finishes at the side and bottom. The Diamond uses Dragontrail scratch-resistant protection and a 1GHz MediaTek MTK6577H dual-core processor. The display features a 5-inch IPS LCD display with a resolution of 720 x 1280.

It was powered by a 2,000 mAh battery alongside a 12.0-megapixel rear facing camera with LED flash and BSI and a 3.0-megapixel front facing camera with BSI.

=== Software ===
The Diamond runs on Android 4.1 Jelly Bean.
