= Starmobile Octa =

Android smartphone from Starmobile

- Brand: Starmobile
- Manufacturer: Starmobile
- Type: Smartphone
- First released: March 2014
- Discontinued: Yes
- Predecessor: Starmobile Diamond X1
- Compatible networks: GSM, HSPA+
- Form factor: Slate
- Dimensions: 145.0×70.0×9.7 mm (5.71×2.76×0.38 in)
- Weight: 136 g (4.8 oz)
- Operating system: Android 4.2.2 (Jelly Bean)
- System-on-chip: MediaTek MT6592
- CPU: 1.7 GHz octa-core Cortex-A7
- GPU: Quad-core Mali-450MP4 (650MHz)
- Memory: 2 GB RAM
- Storage: 32 GB
- Removable storage: None
- SIM: Dual SIM (Micro-SIM / Regular SIM)
- Battery: Non-removable Li-Ion 2300 mAh
- Charging: Qi wireless charging
- Rear camera: 18 MP, autofocus, BSI sensor, dual-LED flash
- Front camera: 8 MP, BSI sensor, LED flash
- Display: 5.0 in (130 mm) IPS LCD; 1080 x 1920 pixels (~440 ppi density), Asahi Dragontrail glass
- Connectivity: NFC, FM Radio tuner, GPS with aGPS support
- Made in: Philippines

The Starmobile Octa is a flagship Android-based smartphone manufactured and designed by the Philippine mobile phone brand Starmobile. It was announced on March 19, 2014 by Michael Chen, and was the second smartphone to have an octa-core processor.

Vice Ganda dubbed this phone as "[the] fastest and most advanced Pinoy smartphone in the country."

== Specifications ==
=== Design and display ===
The frame of the device is made of polycarbonate with matte and metallic finishes, and was occasionally similar to the HTC One. It features a 5.0-inch (130 mm) IPS LCD display with a resolution of 1080 x 1920 pixels.

=== Hardware ===
The Octa was powered by a MediaTek MT6592 chipset paired with a 1.7GHz Octa-core ARM Cortex-A7 processor. Its graphics processor is a Mali-450MP4 clocking at 750MHz. It has an interal memory of 32GB and 2GB of RAM and a li-ion battery of 2,300 mAh that supports both wireless charging out of the box and conventional microUSB charging.

=== Camera and software ===
The camera system consists of one 18-megapixel rear camera with BSI (back-illuminated), autofocus, and dual LED flash and one 8-megapixel wide lens with BSI and LED flash. It runs on Android Jelly Bean 4.2.2.
