= Starmobile Knight =

- Brand: Starmobile
- Manufacturer: Starmobile
- Type: Smartphone
- Series: Knight Series
- First released: July 2013
- Successor: Starmobile Knight X
- Compatible networks: 2G / 3G (HSPA+)
- Form factor: Slate
- Dimensions: 138 mm (5.4 in) H 66.7 mm (2.63 in) W 7.5 mm (0.30 in) D
- Weight: 132 g (4.7 oz)
- Operating system: Android 4.2 (Jelly Bean)
- System-on-chip: MediaTek MT6589
- CPU: 1.2 GHz quad-core ARM Cortex-A7
- GPU: PowerVR SGX544MP
- Memory: 1 GB RAM
- Storage: 4 GB
- Removable storage: microSD (up to 32 GB)
- SIM: Dual SIM (Micro-SIM, dual standby)
- Battery: 2,000 mAh Li-Po (non-removable)
- Charging: Micro-USB
- Rear camera: 18 MP (interpolated from 12.7 MP), BSI sensor, autofocus, LED flash, 1080p video recording
- Front camera: 8 MP (interpolated), BSI sensor, autofocus
- Display: 4.7 in (120 mm) HD IPS LCD, 1280×720 pixels (312 ppi), Corning Gorilla Glass
- References: "Starmobile launches Knight, Icon, Diamond V3, and Diamond V7". Rappler.

The Starmobile Knight is an Android smartphone designed and marketed by Philippine mobile device brand Starmobile. Announced on May 30, 2013, it served as the flagship handset for Starmobile's lineup, it was released in the Philippines on July 12, 2013.

It gained notable attention in the local market for offering high-resolution Backside Illumination (BSI) cameras on both its front and rear, high-definition IPS display, and quad-core processing power at a competitive price point.

== Specifications ==
=== Hardware ===
The Starmobile Knight measures 7.5 mm in thickness and weighs approximately 132 grams. It is powered by a 1.2 GHz quad-core MediaTek MT6589 processor paired with a PowerVR SGX544MP graphics unit and 1 GB of RAM. The phone includes 4 GB of onboard internal storage, which can be expanded by up to 32 GB via a dedicated microSD card slot.

It features a 4.7-inch HD IPS display with a resolution of 1280×720 pixels (~312 ppi) protected by Corning Gorilla Glass. For imaging, the phone sports an 18-megapixel rear camera with autofocus, BSI sensor technology, and an LED flash, alongside an 8-megapixel BSI front-facing camera with autofocus for selfies and video calls. The device is powered by a non-removable 2,000 mAh lithium-polymer battery and supports dual Micro-SIM connectivity over 3G HSPA+ networks.

=== Software ===
The device runs on the Android 4.2 (Jelly Bean) operating system. It includes standard Google Mobile Services preinstalled along with custom software utilities provided by Starmobile for file management and device syncing.
