= Starmobile Diamond D3 =

Android quad-core smartphone from Starmobile

- Brand: Starmobile
- Manufacturer: Starmobile
- Type: Smartphone
- Series: Diamond
- First released: January 2014; 12 years ago
- Predecessor: Starmobile Diamond D2
- Compatible networks: GSM, HSPA+
- Form factor: Slate
- Colors: Coffee; Black
- Operating system: Android 4.2 (Jelly Bean)
- System-on-chip: MediaTek MT6582
- CPU: 1.3 GHz quad-core
- GPU: Mali-400MP
- Memory: 1 GB RAM
- Storage: 4 GB
- Removable storage: microSD (up to 32 GB)
- SIM: Dual SIM
- Battery: 2000 mAh
- Rear camera: 12 MP, BSI, autofocus, LED flash
- Front camera: 8 MP, BSI, autofocus, LED flash
- Display: 5.0 in (130 mm) qHD IPS LCD; 960 x 540 pixels (~220 ppi density)

The Starmobile Diamond D3 is an Android smartphone designed, developed, and marketed by the Filipino tech company Starmobile. The device was launched in January 2014 as part of the brand's Diamond lineup.

Discounts for the Diamond D3 were held on May 15 to June 30.

== Specifications ==
=== Design ===
The Starmobile Diamond D3 features a physical build characterized by a soft matte finish on its rear cover. This texture is complemented by a carbon fiber trim integrated along the sides of the chassis, which provides both visual contrast and textured grip.

The device measures 146.40 mm in height, 73.40 mm in width, and 10.00 mm in thickness, giving it a total weight of 176 grams. It was widely distributed in coffee and black color variants.

=== Hardware ===
The device is powered by a system-on-chip that houses a 1.3 GHz quad-core MediaTek MT6582 processor. Graphics processing is managed by an ARM Mali-400MP graphics processing unit. The phone uses a 2,000 mAh lithium-ion battery.

The smartphone is configured with 1 GB of RAM alongside 4 GB of internal storage space, which can be expanded by an additional 32 GB via a dedicated microSD card slot.

=== Display ===
The handset features a 5-inch in-plane switching (IPS), qHD capacitive touchscreen. It has a resolution of 960×540 pixels with pixel density of approximately 220 pixels per inch.

The panel is overlaid with scratch-resistant Asahi Dragontrail glass.

=== Cameras ===
All cameras incorporating back-illuminated sensors (BSI) on both modules. The rear-facing main camera features a 12-megapixel sensor paired with autofocus capabilities and an LED flash. The front-facing secondary camera features an 8-megapixel sensor that also retains both autofocus and a dedicated front LED flash system.

=== Software ===
The Starmobile Diamond D3 shipped out of the box running the Android 4.2.2 Jelly Bean operating system.
