= Freedom of Information Order (Philippines) =

2016 Philippine executive order

Executive Order No. 2
- Long title: Operationalizing in the Executive Branch the People's Constitutional Right to Information and the State Policies to Full Public Disclosure and Transparency in the Public Service and Providing Guidelines therefor
- Citation: Executive Order No. 2, s. 2016
- Territorial extent: Philippines
- Signed by: Rodrigo Duterte
- Signed: July 23, 2016
- Commenced: November 24, 2016
- Status: In force

Philippine President Rodrigo Duterte signed Executive Order No. 02, also known as the Freedom of Information (FOI) Program, on July 23, 2016, in Davao City. The executive order established the first freedom of information (FOI) Program in the Philippines covering all government offices under the Executive Branch. It requires all executive departments, agencies, bureaus, and offices to disclose public records, contracts, transactions, and any information requested by a member of the public, except for matters affecting national security and other information that falls under the inventory of exceptions issued by Executive Secretary Salvador Medialdea. The order was signed two days before Duterte delivered his first State of the Nation Address and just three weeks after he assumed the presidency on June 30, 2016. The order includes a long list of exceptions, which, according to media watchdogs, could further restrict access to information.

== Background ==
The Bill of Rights of the Philippine Constitution recognizes the people's right to information on matters of public concern. The Bill of Rights also states, "No law shall be passed abridging the freedom of speech, of expression, or of the press, or the right of the people peaceably to assemble and petition the government for redress of grievances."

The Philippines is a signatory to the Universal Declaration of Human Rights and the International Covenant on Civil and Political Rights, which contain provisions for ensuring freedom of expression and freedom of information.

== Provisions of Executive Order No. 02, s. 2016 ==
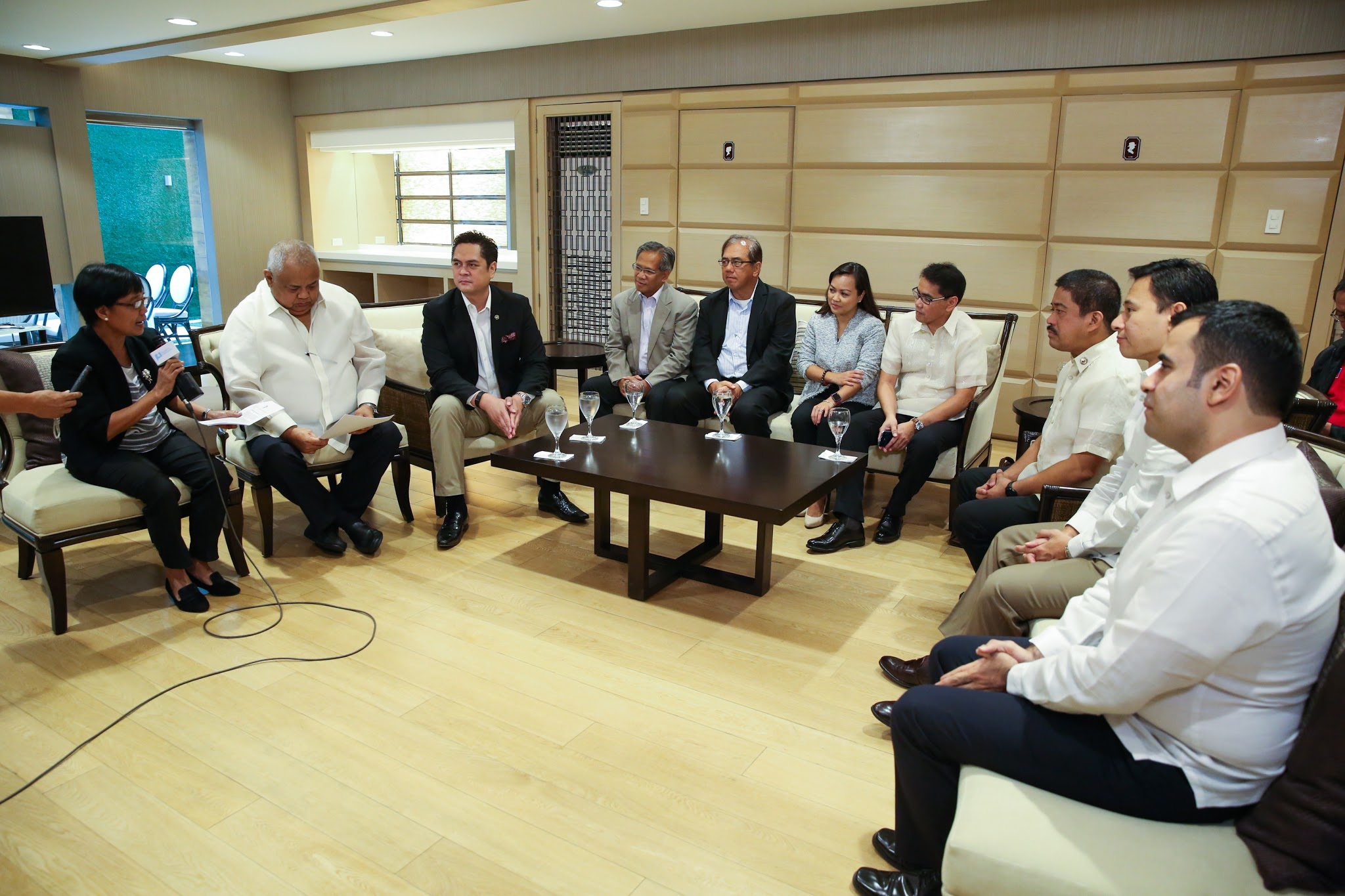
Executive Secretary Salvador Medialdea and Communications Secretary Martin Andanar hand over a copy of the signed, sealed and stamped Executive Order on Freedom of Information to the members of the media coalition and to some members of the Congress during the Executive Order on Freedom of Information symbolic turnover in 2016.

The FOI Executive Order provides for full public disclosure of all government records involving public interest, and upholds the constitutional right of people to information on matters of public concern.

The Order states:

Every Filipino shall have access to information, official records, public records and to documents and papers pertaining to official acts, transactions or decisions, as well as to government research data used as basis for policy development.

— E.O. 2 sec. 3

The Order defines "information" to include any

records, documents, papers, reports, letters, contracts, minutes and transcripts of official meetings, maps, books, photographs, data, research materials, films, sound and video recording, magnetic or other tapes, electronic data, computer stored data, any other like or similar data or materials recorded, stored or archived in whatever format, whether offline or online, which are made, received, or kept in or under the control and custody of any government office pursuant to law, executive order, and rules and regulations or in connection with the performance or transaction of official business by any government office.

— E.O. 2 sec. 1.a

The law expansively defines "official records" as "information produced or received by a public officer or employee, or by a government office in an official capacity or pursuant to a public function or duty," while "public records" refer to "information required by laws, executive orders, rules, or regulations to be entered, kept and made publicly available by a government office." It also emphasizes the obligation of all public officials to file and make available for scrutiny their Statement of Assets, Liabilities and Net worth in accordance with existing laws, jurisprudence, and implementing rules and regulations (IRR) of the Order.

The Order covers the national government and all its offices, departments, bureaus, and instrumentalities, including Government-Owned and/or -Controlled Corporations (GOCCs) and State Universities and Colleges (SUCs). It also encourages all local government units (LGUs) to observe and be guided by this Order.

=== Inventory of FOI exceptions ===
The Order instructs the Department of Justice (DOJ) and the Office of the Solicitor General (OSG) to prepare and submit an inventory of information that falls under any of the exceptions enshrined in the Constitution, existing laws or jurisprudence, within 30 days. It adds that the inventory of exceptions shall be periodically updated to "properly reflect any change in existing laws and jurisprudence."

On August 22, 2016, the DOJ and OSG submitted a list of 166 exceptions, 158 of which are "exceptions to FOI" and six (6) more listed as "other exceptions." The draft list includes information that "directly relates to national security and internal or external defense of the state;" matters of foreign affairs which "could affect ongoing bilateral or multilateral negotiations;" law enforcement matters; and proceedings and investigations being conducted by public authorities.

It also lists as exception information that might endanger a person's life or safety, such as medical records, bank deposits, and other information considered as privileged communication in legal proceedings by law or by the rules of court. Presidential Communications Operations Office (PCOO) Secretary Jose Ruperto Martin Andanar said the draft list of exceptions would still be reviewed by the Office of the Deputy Executive Secretary for Legal Affairs.

When the Order took effect on November 24, 2016, the 166 exceptions submitted by the DOJ and OSG were categorized into nine (9) exceptions, as follows:

1. Information covered by Executive privilege;
2. Privileged information relating to national security, defense or international relations;
3. Information concerning law enforcement and protection of public and personal safety;
4. Information deemed confidential for the protection of the privacy of persons and certain individuals such as minors, victims of crimes, or the accused;
5. Information, documents or records known by reason of official capacity and are deemed as confidential, including those submitted or disclosed by entities to government agencies, tribunals, boards, or officers, in relation to the performance of their functions, or to inquiries or investigation conducted by them in the exercise of their administrative, regulatory, or quasi-judicial powers;
6. Prejudicial premature disclosure;
7. Records of proceedings or information from proceedings which, pursuant to law or relevant rules and regulations, are treated as confidential or privileged;
8. Matters considered confidential under banking and finance laws, and their amendatory laws; and
9. Other exceptions to the right to information under laws, jurisprudence, and IRR.

=== People's FOI Manual ===
The Order directs all government offices under the Executive Branch to prepare and submit their own People's FOI Manual within 120 days upon its effectivity. It shall include:

(a) The location and contact information of the head, regional, provincial, and field offices, and other established places where the public can obtain information or submit requests;
(b) The person or office responsible for receiving requests for information;
(c) The procedure for the filing and processing of the request as specified in the succeeding section 8 of this Order.
(d) The standard forms for the submission of requests and for the proper acknowledgment of requests;
(e) The process for the disposition of requests;
(f) The procedure for the administrative appeal of any denial for access to information; and
(g) The schedule of applicable fees.

— E.O. 2 sec. 8

As of August 2018, the following agencies have submitted their People's FOI Manuals:

- 100% or 190 out of 190 National Government Agencies (NGAs);
- 85% or 100 out of 118 GOCCs;
- 90% or 101 out of 112 SUCs; and
- 34% or 176 out of 521 Local Water Districts (LWDs).

=== Process of requesting information ===
Filipino citizens may access government information either through the standard (paper-based) platform or the Electronic FOI (eFOI) Portal.

The request for access to a government document by any member of the public shall be in writing and must include the name and contact information of the requesting party, a valid proof of his identification, the specific information being requested, and the reason or purpose for the request for information. Upon receiving the application, the government official must provide reasonable assistance to the requesting party, and shall respond and notify the applicant of their decision in relation to the request within 15 working days of receiving the request. If access has been denied wholly or in part, reasons must be provided to the applicant. The Order states: "No request for information shall be denied unless it clearly falls under any of the exceptions listed in the inventory or updated inventory of exceptions."

The 15 working day response period may be extended to additional 20 working days, in cases where the information being requested requires extensive research or examination of voluminous records. The response period may also be prolonged in the event of unexpected disruption to government services. The government official is then required to notify the applicant of the extension. Failure to notify the requesting party of the action taken on the request within the response period will be viewed as a denial of the request.

=== Sanctions for non-compliance ===
Pursuant to the Order, failure to comply with its provisions may be a ground for administrative and disciplinary sanctions against any erring public officer based on the Revised Rules on Administrative Cases in the Civil Service.

=== Remedies in case of denial ===
A person whose request for access to information has been denied may file an appeal to the Central Appeals and Review Committee of the concerned agency.

Written appeal must be filed by the same person making the request within 15 calendar days from the notice of denial or from the lapse of the period to respond to the request. The appeal shall be decided within 30 working days from the filing of said written appeal. Failure of such person or office to decide within the period shall be deemed a denial of the appeal.

Upon exhaustion of administrative appeal remedies, the requesting party may file the appropriate judicial action in accordance with the Rules of Court.

== The Freedom of Information – Project Management Office ==
Through Memorandum Order No. 10, s. 2016, the Office of the Executive Secretary (OES) mandated the PCOO to act as the lead implementing agency for the FOI Program. To operationalize this, the PCOO established the Freedom of Information – Project Management Office (FOI-PMO) through PCOO Department Order No. 18, s. 2017.

The vision of the FOI-PMO is to regain public trust by revolutionizing how the government discloses information to the citizens and ensuring that government agencies respond to citizen concerns and provide the information they need, all within 15 to 35 working days.

=== Outside the Executive Branch ===
Although the Order only covers agencies under the Executive Branch, LGUs and other government agencies outside the Executive Branch are encouraged to observe and be guided by the Order Ref.

As of August 2018, the following offices have submitted their FOI Manuals either in paper and/or digital format, and complied with the provisions in the said Order:

1. Office of the Ombudsman (OMB) News Art
2. Commission on Audit News Art

=== Localizing the FOI Program ===
Based on a thorough review of the top requested information from government agencies, it has been found that there is a high demand for local, granular information, News Art such as Internal Revenue Allotments, Regional Development Plans, and information on the Local Government Support Fund. Ref

To address this, the PCOO has partnered with the Department of the Interior and Local Government (DILG) to establish measures to promote the issuance of local FOI Ordinances. The local FOI Ordinance serves as the local counterpart of the Order and sets the standards in providing access to information under the jurisdiction of LGUs. News Art

A PCOO-DILG Joint Memorandum Circular is currently being drafted to further push and support LGUs in the local implementation of the program. News Art

As of August 2018, the following LGUs have already passed their own local FOI Ordinances:

- City Government of Laoag; News Art
- Provincial Government of Ilocos Norte; News Art
- Municipal Government of San Nicolas; Att
- Provincial Government of Bohol; News Art and
- Provincial Government of Masbate. News Art

== The FOI Portal ==
eFreedom of Information "transparency seal" required to be displayed on government agencies websites

The Electronic Freedom of Information (eFOI) website was launched on November 25, 2016. It is an online request platform open to the public that facilitates requests for data and information from various government agencies.

The online Portal was initially limited to 15 government agencies in its beta phase, namely the PCOO, Philippine Statistics Authority (PSA), Department of Budget and Management (DBM), Department of Information and Communications Technology (DICT), Presidential Commission on Good Government (PCGG), National Archives of the Philippines (NAP), Department of Transportation (DOTr), Department of Finance (DOF), DOJ, Public Attorney's Office (PAO), Office of the Government Corporate Counsel (OGCC), OSG, Philippine National Police (PNP), Department of Health (DOH), and PhilHealth.

As of October 2023, the eFOI website currently has over 209 thousand requests for information lodged for 590 government agencies through the portal.

== Barriers to access ==
Media watchdogs said that with the long list of exceptions covered by the Freedom of Information Order, access to information may have become more restricted. According to journalists and fact checking organizations, many documents remain inaccessible despite Duterte's Freedom of Information Order. For example, information about Duterte's health and his Statement of Assets, Liabilities and Net Worth have been withheld from the public. Records relating to the Philippine drug war have also been withheld, despite a Supreme Court order to the Office of the Solicitor General to release drug war records, as these "do not obviously involve state secrets affecting national security".

On 17 March 2023, President Bongbong Marcos added more exceptions, including information relating to investigations into the stolen wealth of the Marcos family.

In 2025, Irene Khan, United Nations Special Rapporteur on the promotion of the right to freedom of opinion and expression, said that the Freedom of Information Order lists "overly broad or vaguely framed exemptions", and suggests the passage of a law that would give civil society and mass media more access to information.
