= First 100 days of the Duterte presidency =

The first 100 days of Rodrigo Duterte's presidency began on June 30, 2016, the day Rodrigo Duterte was inaugurated as the 16th president of the Philippines. The concept of the first 100 days of a presidential term was first adopted in the Philippines by President Corazon Aquino from the United States and has since been used as a gauge of presidential success and activism, and is a considered the "honeymoon period" where traditional critics are urged to refrain from detracting the new president. The 100th day of his presidency ended at noon on October 8, 2016.

== Pledges ==
Duterte pledged to do the following during his campaign period:

- Kill drug lords and suppress illegal drug trade
- Suppress crime by the end of 2016
- Improve salary and equipment of the police and military
- Implement Davao City's law-and-order measures on the national level
- Stop corruption and red tape in government
- Shift to a federal form of government
- Begin peace talks with communists and Islamic separatists
- Phase out contractualization
- Push for passage of the Freedom of Information law
- Provide free irrigation for farmers by 2017
- Introduce a ₱1 billion fund in every region for micro, small and medium enterprises
- Create an Overseas Filipino Workers department
- Bury the body of President Ferdinand Marcos at the Libingan ng mga Bayani
- Continue the 4Ps program of the Aquino administration
- Discontinue previous land reform program
- Distribute coco levy funds to farmers and develop new coconut farms
- Promote family planning to prevent overpopulation
- Lay claim to the nearest Chinese-occupied island
- Terminate big mining companies in Mindanao that damage the environment
- Solve traffic problem in Metro Manila
- Raise infrastructure spending to up to 7% of GDP

== Administration and cabinet ==
On May 31, 2016, a few weeks before his presidential inauguration, Duterte named his cabinet members, which comprised a diverse selection of former military generals, childhood friends, classmates, and leftists. Following his inauguration, he administered a mass oath-taking for his Cabinet officials, and held his first Cabinet meeting on June 30.

Cabinet of Rodrigo Duterte during his first 100 days
Office	Name	Term (until October 8, 2016)
President	Rodrigo Duterte	June 30, 2016 –
Head of state	Rodrigo Duterte	June 30, 2016 –
Head of government	Rodrigo Duterte	June 30, 2016 –
Vice-President	Maria Leonor G. Robredo	June 30, 2016 –
Executive Secretary	Salvador Medialdea	June 30, 2016 –
Chief Presidential Legal Counsel	Salvador Panelo	June 30, 2016 –
Cabinet Secretary	Leoncio Evasco Jr.	June 30, 2016 –
Secretary of Agrarian Reform	Rafael V. Mariano	June 30, 2016 –
Secretary of Agriculture	Manny Piñol	June 30, 2016 –
Secretary of Budget and Management	Benjamin Diokno	June 30, 2016 –
Secretary of Education	Leonor Magtolis Briones	June 30, 2016 –
Secretary of Energy	Alfonso Cusi	June 30, 2016 –
Secretary of Environment and Natural Resources	Gina López	June 30, 2016 –
Secretary of Finance	Carlos Dominguez III	June 30, 2016 –
Secretary of Foreign Affairs	Perfecto Yasay Jr.	June 30, 2016 –
Secretary of Health	Paulyn Jean Rosell-Ubial, M.D.	June 30, 2016 –
Secretary of Information and Communications Technology	Rodolfo Salalima	June 30, 2016 –
Secretary of the Interior and Local Government	Ismael Sueno	June 30, 2016 –
Secretary of Justice	Vitaliano Aguirre II	June 30, 2016 –
Secretary of Labor and Employment	Silvestre Bello III	June 30, 2016 –
Secretary of National Defense	Ret. Maj. Gen. Delfin Lorenzana, AFP	June 30, 2016 –
Secretary of Public Works and Highways	Rafael Yabut (Acting)	July 1, 2016 – July 26/27, 2016
Secretary of Public Works and Highways	Mark Villar	June 30, 2016 –
Secretary of Science and Technology	Fortunato de la Peña	June 30, 2016 –
Secretary of Social Welfare and Development	Judy Taguiwalo	June 30, 2016 –
Secretary of Tourism	Wanda Corazon Teo	June 30, 2016 –
Secretary of Trade and Industry	Ramon Lopez	June 30, 2016 –
Secretary of Transportation	Arthur Tugade	June 30, 2016 –
Presidential Spokesperson	Ernesto Abella	June 30, 2016 –
Secretary of the Presidential Communications Operations Office	Martin Andanar	June 30, 2016 –
Director-General of the National Economic and Development Authority	Ernesto Pernia	June 30, 2016 –
National Security Adviser	Ret. Gen. Hermogenes Esperon, AFP	June 30, 2016 –
Presidential Adviser on the Peace Process	Jesus Dureza	June 30, 2016 –
Special Assistant to the President	Christopher Lawrence "Bong" Go	June 30, 2016 –

== Timeline ==
=== July ===
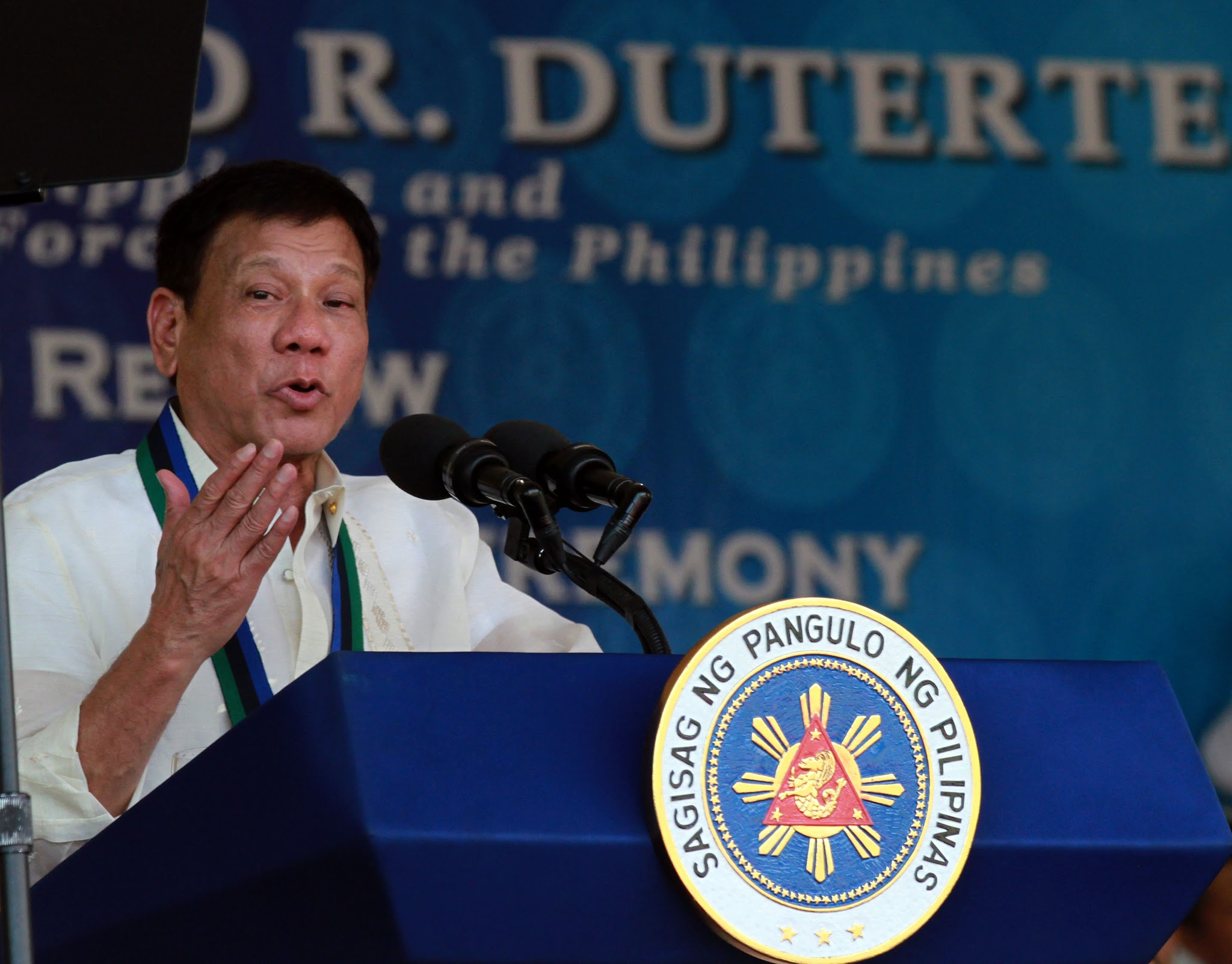
Duterte delivers his speech during the turnover rites of the Armed Forces of the Philippines at Camp Aguinaldo

Shortly after his inauguration, Duterte held his first Cabinet meeting to lay out his plans for the Cabinet, which included the establishment of a 24-hour complaint office covering the entire country and advancing the country's disaster risk reduction management, lamenting its current status after recalling his personal encounter with the previous administration's failure to address the lack of basic needs of the victims of Typhoon Haiyan (Yolanda) in 2013. He laid out his plan to decongest Ninoy Aquino International Airport in Manila, the country's main gateway, by transferring the operations of domestic flights to Clark International Airport in Angeles, Pampanga and constructing a road network between Angeles and Manila while his government reviews the possibility of constructing a new airport at the Naval Station Sangley Point in Cavite. He also advised the Civil Aviation Authority of the Philippines not to provide him and his Cabinet officials with special priority treatment different from ordinary citizens. Duterte criticised healthcare in the Philippines, saying that the country could learn from healthcare in Cuba and ordered his Health Secretary, Paulyn Ubial, to travel to Cuba. Occurring twelve days prior to the announcement of the outcome of the Philippines' arbitration case against China over the territorial disputes in the South China Sea, Duterte said that he and his Foreign Secretary, Perfecto Yasay, Jr., will study the implications of the ruling to better plan any further steps taken by the government to address the issue. Duterte also expressed his willingness to stop the online gambling industry. After the Cabinet meeting, Duterte met with representatives from militant groups to discuss the "People's Agenda for Change" plan.

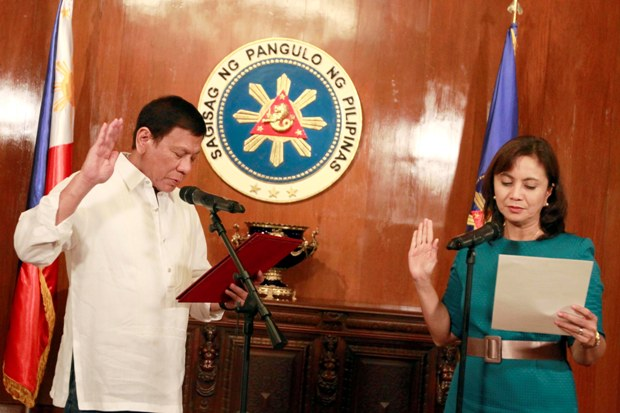
Duterte swears in Vice President Leni Robredo as HUDCC Secretary at the Malacañang Palace on July 12, 2016.

On July 1, 2016, a day after the inauguration, President Duterte attended the change-of-command ceremonies for the new Philippine National Police chief Ronald de la Rosa and the new Armed Forces of the Philippines (AFP) chief-of-staff Ricardo Visaya.

On July 7, 2016, Duterte appointed Robredo to a Cabinet position (as the head of the Housing and Urban Development Coordinating Council). Despite opposition, Duterte announced on May 23, 2016, that he would allow the burial of Ferdinand Marcos' remains in the Libingan ng mga Bayani.

Duterte issued his first executive order on July 4, entitled "Reengineering the Office of the President Towards Greater Responsiveness to the Attainment of Development Goals". In the executive order, 12 agencies under the Office of the President who focused on anti-poverty programs will be placed under the supervision of Cabinet Secretary Leoncio Evasco, Jr. Duterte said he will end insurgency and war conflicts in the Mindanao, before his term ends, through peace negotiations between the government and the Moro Islamic Liberation Front (MILF), the Moro National Liberation Front (MNLF) and other Moro groups. Duterte noted that the intervention of foreign countries, including the United States, caused the worsened war situation in the Middle East countries including Iraq and Libya.

On July 12, 2016, the Permanent Court of Arbitration (PCA) tribunal agreed unanimously with the Philippines in the international case, Philippines v. China, which former president Benigno Aquino III initiated in January 2013. In its award, it concluded that there is no evidence that China had historically exercised exclusive control over the waters or resources, hence there was "no legal basis for China to claim historic rights" over the area within the nine-dash line. The tribunal also judged that the PRC had caused "severe harm to the coral reef environment", and that it had violated the Philippines' sovereign rights in its Exclusive Economic Zone by interfering with Philippine fishing and petroleum exploration by, for example, restricting the traditional fishing rights of Filipino fishermen at Scarborough Shoal. The PRC rejected the ruling, calling it "ill-founded", but they would still be committed to resolving disputes with its neighbours. On the same day, Duterte has named Finance Undersecretary Gil Beltran as the "Anti-Red Tape Czar".

Duterte has offered former President Fidel V. Ramos to become the Philippines' special envoy to China on the planned bilateral talks between two countries, in connection with the ongoing South China Sea dispute.

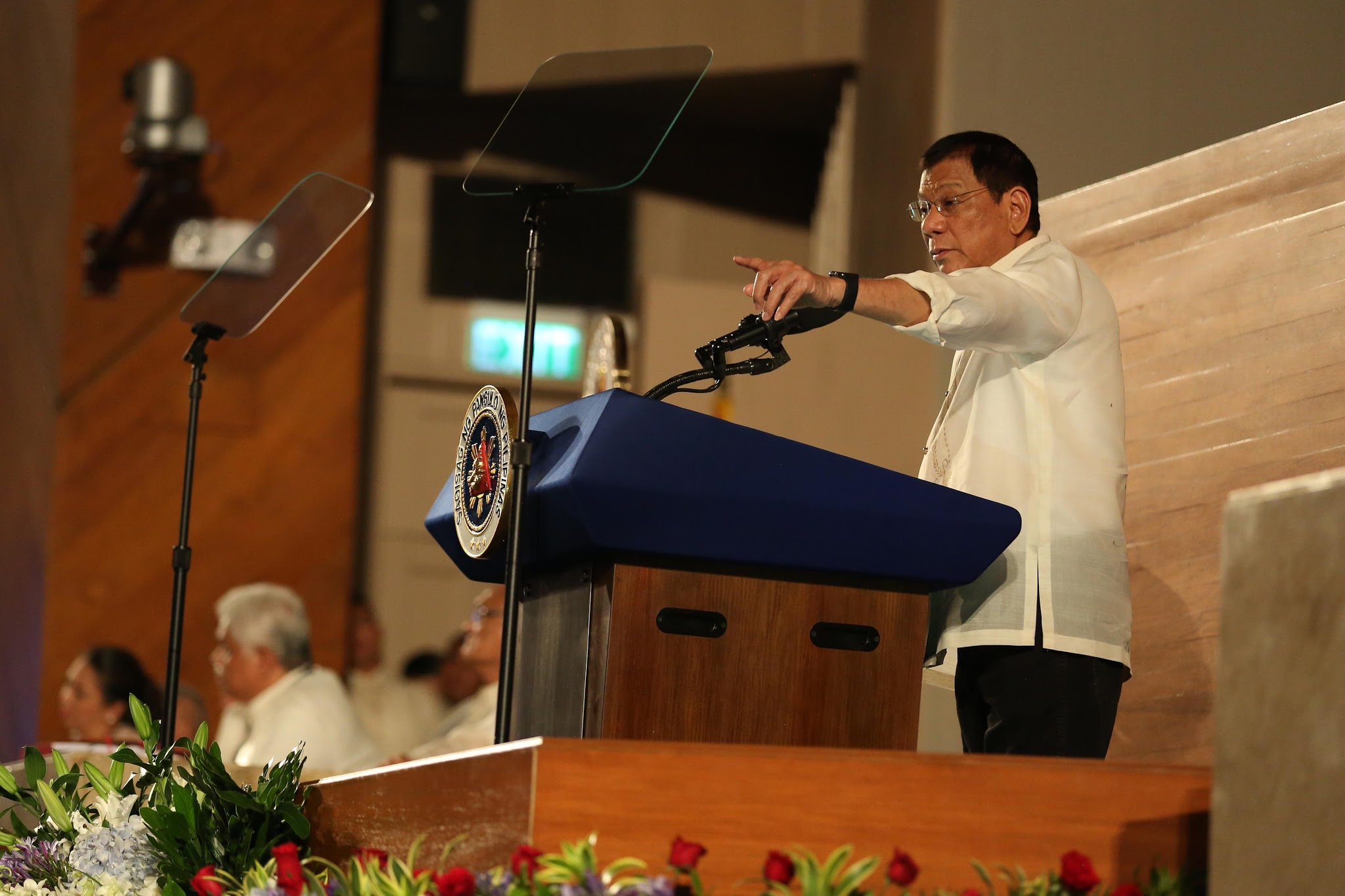
Duterte delivers his first State of the Nation Address, July 25, 2016

Two days before his first State of the Nation Address, on July 23, Duterte signed the Freedom of Information Order that covered all offices under the executive branch.

On July 25, 2016, Duterte delivered his first State of the Nation Address.

On July 27, 2016, Duterte met with United States Secretary of State John Kerry, the first foreign minister Duterte met with as president and the highest ranking diplomat he met with since his inauguration, to discuss cooperation between the Philippines and the United States under the Duterte administration following the Permanent Court of Arbitration's ruling in favor of the Philippines against China's claim over the territorial disputes in the South China Sea. Later that day, the first National Security Council meeting under the Duterte presidency was held. It was attended by former presidents and NSC members Fidel Ramos, Joseph Estrada, Gloria Macapagal Arroyo, and Benigno Aquino III, together with Vice President Leni Robredo, Senate President Koko Pimentel, House Speaker Pantaleon Alvarez, and other cabinet secretaries.

=== August to October 8 ===
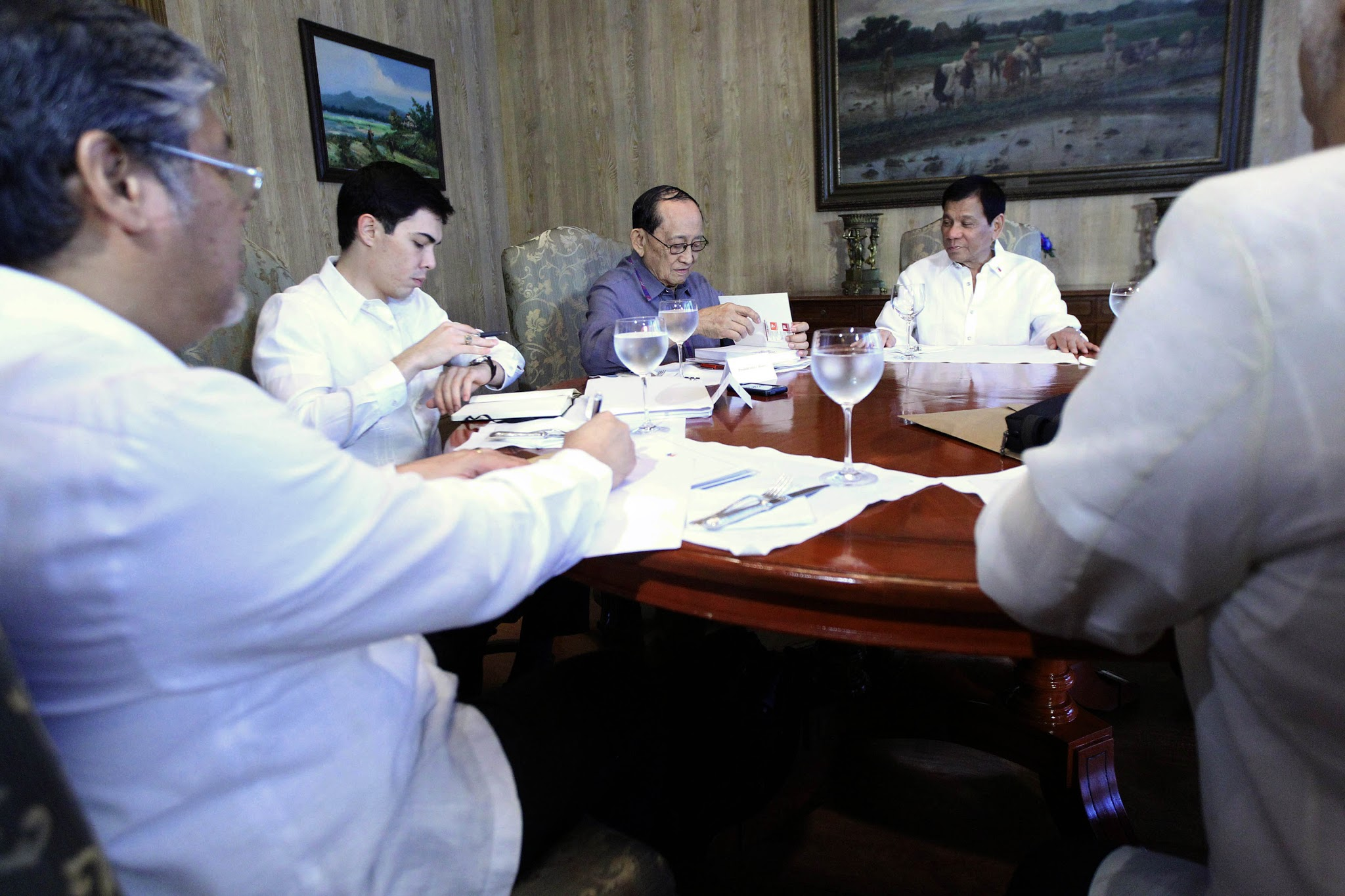
Duterte (right) meets with former President and Special Envoy to China Fidel V. Ramos (center) in Malacañang Palace on September 14, 2016.

On August 7, 2016, Duterte, who was at the wake of four soldiers killed in an encounter with communist rebels in Camp Panacan, Davao City, delivered a speech wherein he named local government officials, court judges and police officers who are all involved in illegal drug trade.

On September 2, Duterte declared a "state of lawlessness" in the country, which would remain in effect for over a year, after a bomb exploded in Davao City in Mindanao. The bombing was linked to the Maute group, although Abu Sayyaf reportedly claimed responsibility for the bombing but later denied it. Before leaving for his first international summit in Laos in early September, he slammed US president Barack Obama for his criticism on human rights issues brought about by the Philippines' controversial drug war, quickly making international headlines, but almost two years later, apologized for these remarks.

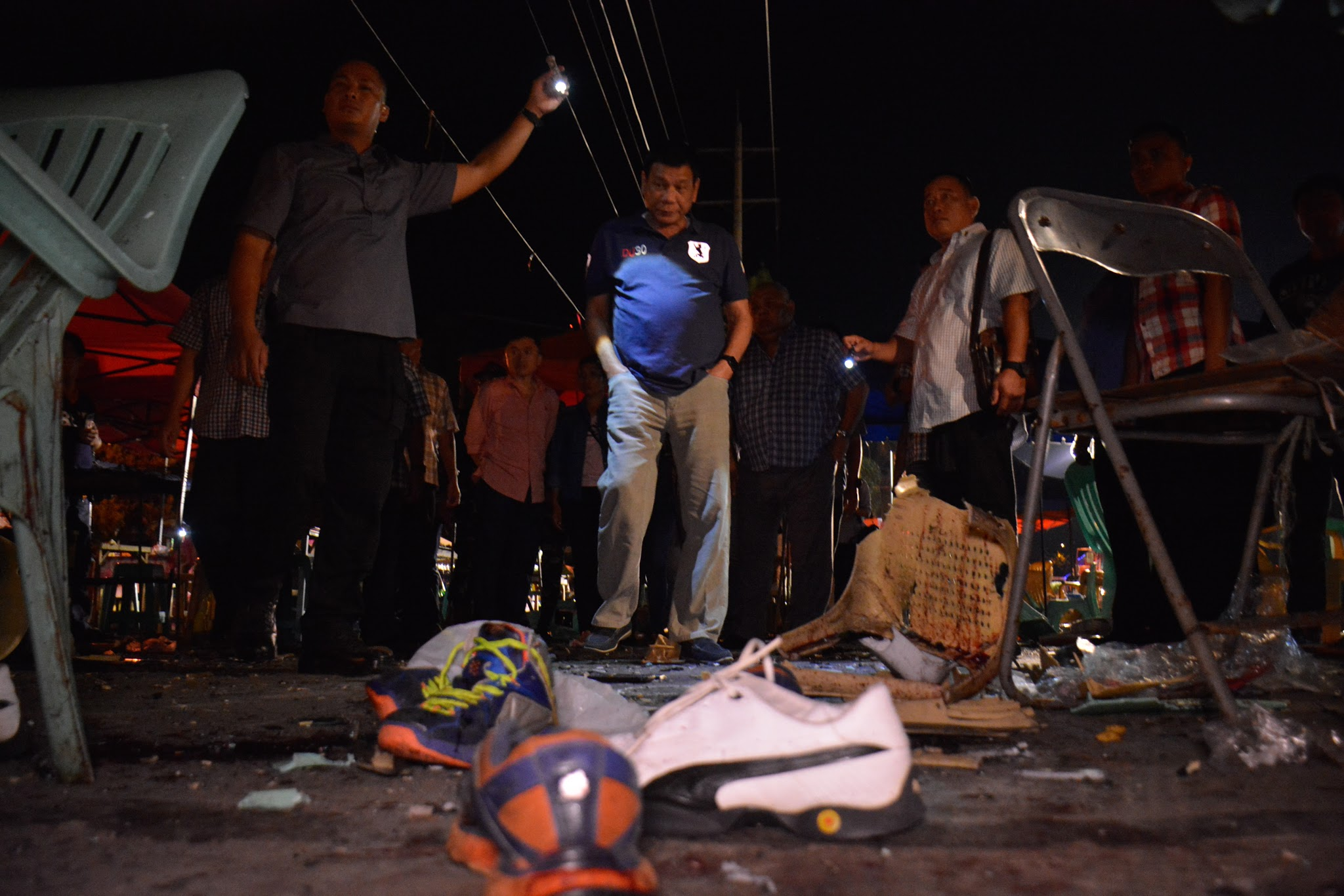
Duterte (center) visits the blast site along Roxas night market in Davao City on September 3, 2016

Duterte critic Leila de Lima faced a series of investigations on the New Bilibid Prison drug trafficking scandal, with De Lima refusing to attend, calling it a “sham inquiry” and a mere ploy to discredit her. In the Senate's probe on extrajudicial killings related to the drug war, De Lima presented Edgar Matobato, a self-confessed hitman and member of the so-called Davao Death Squad. Matobato testified that Duterte ordered the group to execute people back when he was Davao City mayor. However, this was later refuted and disproven. and it was labeled as 'hearsay' and 'lies' by Duterte.

By the end of September, Duterte lamented that he was being portrayed as a “cousin” of Nazi leader Adolf Hitler, but later drew parallels between his drug war and the annihilation of 3 million Jews during the Holocaust. He later apologized for his remarks, saying "There was never an intention on my part to derogate the memory of 6 million Jews murdered by the Germans".

== Domestic policy ==
=== Drug policy ===
In Duterte's first 100 days in office, a rough estimate of 3,600 killings were attributed to his intensified campaign against illegal drugs, which included more than 1,300 suspects killed in gunbattles with police, and about half of them killed by unknown assailants. There were more than 23,500 raids and 22,500 arrests conducted by the police on suspected drug dealers and addicts, and more than 1.6 million houses of drug suspects visited by police to invite them to surrender and disengage from the drug trade. Approximately 732,000 addicts and dealers have surrendered to authorities, overwhelming the administration and prompting them to build more rehabilitation centers. The growing number of extrajudicial executions since the campaign started garnered worldwide attention and prompted the United States, the European Union, the United Nations, human rights watchdogs, and opposition groups to probe into the killings which were believed to be state-sanctioned. The Duterte administration welcomed any investigation on the anti-drug campaign and stressed that criticism be based on substantial evidence.

=== Crime ===
During Duterte's first 100 days, incidents of rape, theft, robbery, and other crimes against property fell, while murder and homicide, which were attributed to police operations during his intensified anti-drug war, rose.

=== Corruption and red tape ===
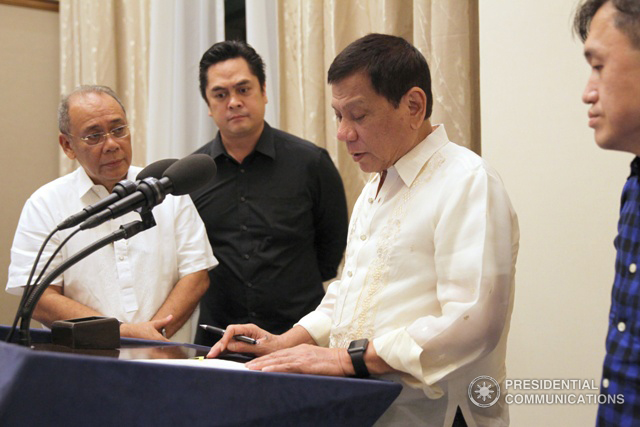
Duterte signs the Freedom of Information executive order in Davao City on July 24, 2016.

Duterte signed his second executive order implementing Freedom of Information, requiring full public disclosure of documents from offices under the executive branch in an effort to promote transparency in the government. Citizen complaint hotlines were activated; 911 for emergencies and 8888 for reporting government officials. Approval of land titles were cut from about 6 months to 5 days. Three executive departments ordered local government units to cut business registration processing time to two days for new applicants, and to one day for renewal.

=== Police and military wage hike ===
Duterte asked Budget Secretary Benjamin Diokno and Defense Secretary Delfin Lorenzana to increase the salaries of uniformed personnel incrementally. In September 26, he signed an executive order increasing the combat duty pay and combat incentive pay of military and police personnel.

=== Federalism ===
By Duterte's 100th day in office, at least two measures pushing the shift to federalism were filed in Congress.

=== Insurgency ===
The Duterte administration temporarily released consultants of the National Democratic Front. Peace talks between the government and the Communist Party of the Philippines (CPP) took place in August in Oslo, Norway, resulting in an indefinite ceasefire between both sides. By October 8, both sides have returned to Oslo for the second round of peace talks.

Peace talks between the government and the Moro rebels continued.

=== Contractualization ===
Duterte warned to shut down companies practicing contractualization. By the first week of October, about 10,532 employees have been regularized by 195 employers. Labor groups, however, called on the administration for the total abolition of legal subcontracting by repealing Articles 106 to 109 of the Labor Code of the Philippines.

=== Conditional cash transfer ===
The Duterte administration continued the Conditional cash transfer program of the Aquino administration, but Social Welfare Secretary Judy Taguiwalo said there will be no new beneficiaries. By the end of Duterte's first 100 days, 4.4 million households were included in the social protection program.

=== Metro Manila traffic ===
Duterte called on Congress to grant him emergency powers to hasten solving the traffic problem in Metro Manila. Senator Franklin Drilon and Representative Gloria Arroyo filed bills seeking to grant him emergency powers.

=== Free irrigation ===
Senator Loren Legarda committed to include a ₱4-billion budget for free irrigation in the 2017 national budget. Duterte also approved ₱21 billion worth of assistance to rice farmers.

=== Micro, small, and medium enterprises ===
By September 2016, Trade Secretary Ramon Lopez reported that 307 Negosyo Centers have been established by the administration.

=== Migrant workers ===
Duterte asked Labor Secretary Silvestre Bello to create a one-stop shop for overseas Filipino workers (OFWs). The first shop opened on August 15. Bills were filed in the House and Senate seeking the creation of a department dedicated for OFWs.

=== Mining ===
Environment Secretary Gina Lopez, a staunch environmentalist, audited existing mines to check for their compliance in responsible mining. Mining operations were suspended in the Autonomous Region in Muslim Mindanao.

== Foreign policy ==
The Duterte administration has vowed to pursue an "independent foreign policy" that would reject any meddling by foreign governments. Duterte made efforts to distance from the United States and forge closer relationships with China and Russia.

Duterte placed great importance on the Philippines' diplomatic relations with its ASEAN neighbors. Following tradition, his first trips outside the country were to Laos on September 7 for the 49th Association of Southeast Asian Nations Leaders Summit, Indonesia on September 9, and Vietnam on September 29.

Duterte attracted international attention and criticism after slamming US President Barack Obama, United Nations (UN) head Ban Ki-moon, UN rapporteurs and international human rights groups, who expressed condemnation to his aggressive war on drugs. He also expressed his intention to end the Balikatan joint military exercises and dared the European Union and the US to withdraw its financial assistance to the country, saying "If you think it is high time for you guys to withdraw your assistance, go ahead. We will not beg for it. We have a problem here trying to preserve our society … Go away and take your money somewhere else".

== Approval ratings ==
Two weeks into Duterte's presidency, on July 13, 2016, the Social Weather Stations (SWS) conducted the first survey on his presidency since his inauguration on June 30, where Duterte received an "excellent" trust rating of 79% among 1,200 adults nationwide. A week later, on July 20, Pulse Asia released a poll conducted on July 2–8 showing 91% of Filipinos trust Duterte, making him the most trusted official in the Philippines since 1999.

Toward the end of his first 100 days, Duterte obtained a +64 or "very good" net satisfaction rating in a survey of 1,200 adult respondents conducted by the SWS in September 24 to 26.

== See also ==
- Rodrigo Duterte 2016 presidential campaign
- Presidential transition of Rodrigo Duterte
- Inauguration of Rodrigo Duterte
