= Ukay-ukay =

Type of Philippine retailer

An ukay-ukay (Tagalog pronunciation: [ˌʔuːkaɪ.ˈʔuːkaɪ] oo-ky-OO-ky) or wagwagan (Ilocano pronunciation: [wɐgˈwaːgɐn] wəg-WAH-gən) is a Philippine store where a mix of secondhand and surplus items such as clothes, bags, shoes and other accessories are sold at a more affordable price. Items commonly sold at ukay-ukays are imported from Hong Kong, South Korea, Japan, the United States, and the United Kingdom.

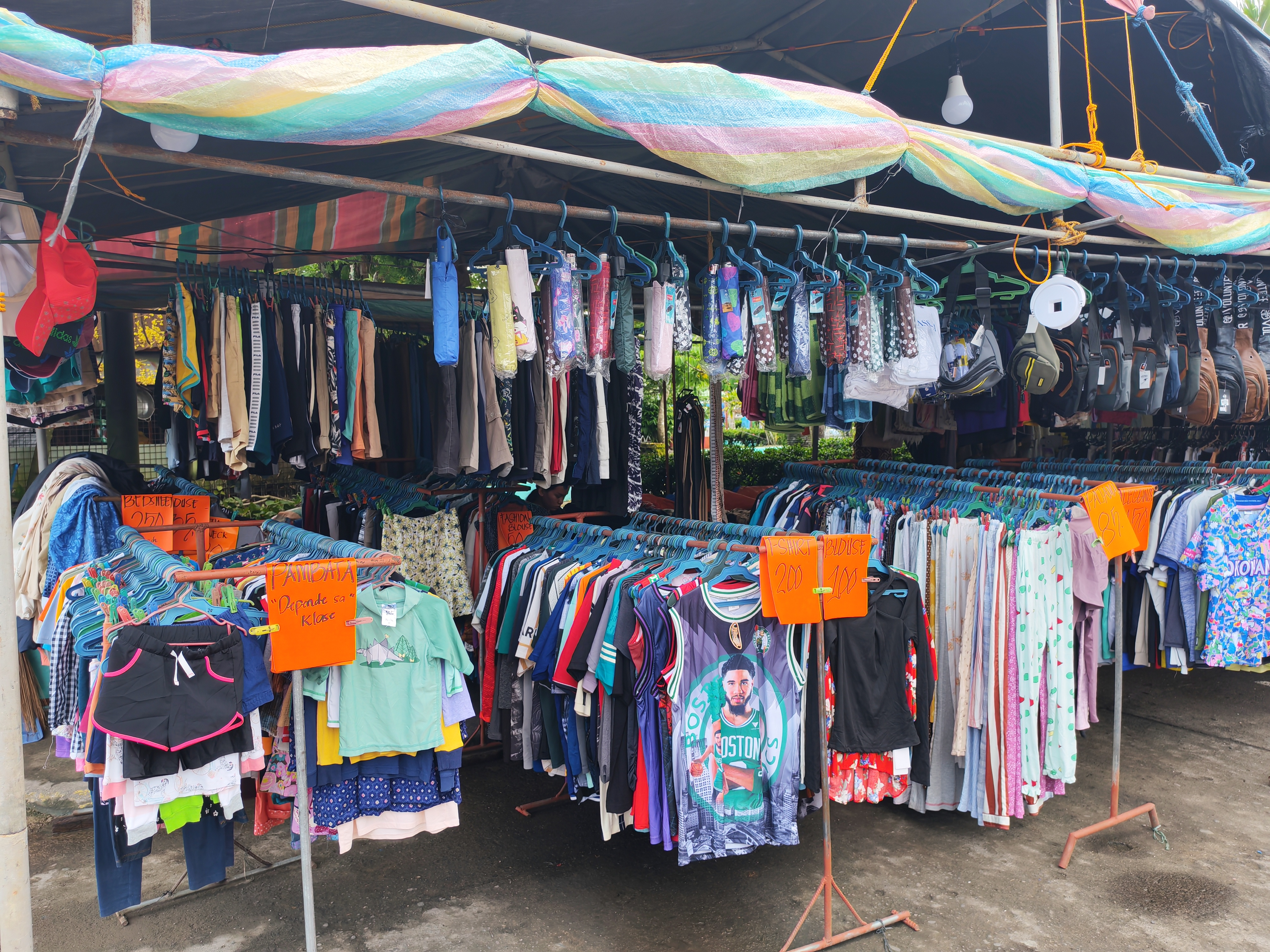
An ukay-ukay stall in Saint Bernard, Southern Leyte

== Etymology ==
The term ukay-ukay is derived from the Cebuano verb ukay, which means "to dig" or "to sift through" respectively. Technically, the English term of Ukay-Ukay is "DIG-DIG". It is synonymous with the Ilocano verb wagwag, an act of dusting off a piece of clothing by taking hold of one end and snapping it in the air, and shaking the item to dust it off; and SM, meaning segunda mano (secondhand), which is also a pun on the foremost Philippine retail chain SM.

The term wagwag was more commonly used in the early to late 1990s, as this type of business originated in Baguio City, later spreading to the Cordillera Administrative Region and then to the rest of northern Philippines. Eventually, it reached the National Capital Region and the rest of the Philippines through Cordilleran traders led by the Colod Family of Baguio City. The Tagalog and Bisaya speakers had difficulty pronouncing and adopting the term wagwag, hence, they coined the term ukay-ukay in the early 2000s which was also adopted alongside the original term wagwag by the merchant-minded northerners whose goods are widely popular and accepted by their consumers.

== History ==
The first ukay-ukay was founded in the mid-1990s at Baguio City by Evangeline Dis-iw Colod, often referred to the Queen of Ukay-Ukay or Wagwag in the local languages of northern Philippines particularly to the highland localities. When calamities frequented the Philippines during that year, the various global branches of the Salvation Army sent secondhand garments and other goods to the refugees and victims as humanitarian assistance. This practice continued through the efforts of Ms. Colod and her family and associates and would even go to the extent of visiting Salvation Army branches outside the Philippines for the continuity of the practice. Soon enough, the shipped goods, upon piling up, were bought in bulk which resulted into oversupply of donated clothes. The Colod Family would monetize these donations to help the humanitarian agency cope with its financial standing, then sell the acquired goods to the public at significantly low prices to help those who could barely afford decent clothing during the post 1990 earthquake era. They used to market it to the low-income bracket as one of the earliest forms of social entrepreneurship, but following ukay-ukay's increase in popularity, relatively richer customers seeking low-priced branded and high quality goods patronized ukay-ukay stores.

Nevertheless, ukay-ukay particularly through the employ and retail of the Colod Family of Baguio City has helped families around the country to rise from poverty and created a number of wealthy families whose businesses create jobs and benefit the poor by giving them access to affordable and quality clothing as primarily intended by the Colod Family when they started the business. As to the legality of the practice, traders sought to sell goods that were already in the country through legal means, hence, there was no legal impediment to do so.

== Legality ==
The commercial importation of secondhand clothing to the Philippines has been prohibited since 1966 under the Republic Act No. 4653, also known as the "Act to safeguard the health of the Filipino people and maintain the dignity of the nation through the prohibition of the importation of used clothing and rags". It renders direct importation of used clothes as illegal but the selling of goods that are already in the country through legal means is allowed. There have been many calls to review and amend the law legalizing the importation of used clothing for retail of ukay-ukay stores.

== See also ==
- Divisoria
- Flea market
- Sari-sari store
- Used Good

== Bibliography ==
- Matthews, Gordon; Ribeiro, Gustavo Lins; Vega, Carlos Alba, eds. (2012). Globalization from Below: The World's Other Economy. London: Routledge. pp. 123–129. ISBN 978-0-415-53508-3.
