= Dennis Jose Borbon =

Filipino fraudster

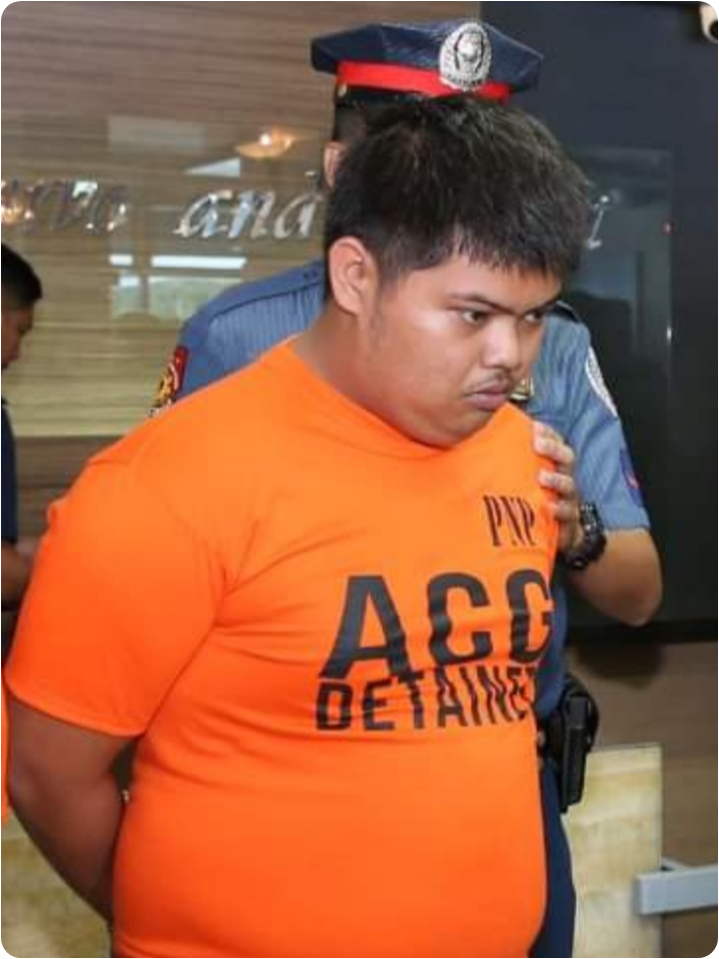
- Borbon in his arrest on August 1, 2019.
- Years active: 2016-2021
- Conviction: August 1, 2019
- Penalty: Sedition, Cyberlibel, Libel, Estafa, Obstruction of Justice

Details
- Victims: JV Ejercito, Bong Go, Tito Sotto

Dennis Jose Borbon is an alleged fraudster, a congressional staff, and an alleged blogger who reportedly scammed senators JV Ejercito, Bong Go, and Tito Sotto. As a result, he got arrested on August 1, 2019. Borbon started scamming in 2016, attempting to scam JV Ejercito. Three years later, he attempted to scam Bong Go. He acted as Representative Arnulfo Fuentebella, going into a back-and-forth with Go. Go eventually found out he was not Fuentebella. That same year, he was arrested by the Philippine National Police (PNP). During his arrest, he stated that he was a popular blogger and that he was paid by Senators Bam Aquino and Antonio Trillanes and Representative Gary Alejano to smear Duterte in his blogs. He was charged with estafa. (Note: A criminal case revolving around fraud.) In 2021, two years after the arrest, he was the mastermind of a scam targeting Tito Sotto. He was, again, charged with estafa.

== Early scams ==
=== Bong Go scam ===
On August 1, 2019, Senator Bong Go announced in Camp Crame, along with Philippine National Police Chief Oscar Albayalde, Representative Arnulfo Fuentebella, and Presidential Anti-Corruption Commissioner Greco Belgica that two men attempted to extort money from Go acting as Rep. Fuentebella. Go announced that the two men were Borbon and his accomplice, Edgar Bularan, who extorted other politicians using the messaging app Viber.

According to Go, when the men messaged him, he got suspicious and went on to check if he was the "real Fuentebella." Go messaged Fuentebella, with the latter stating that the message was fake. He further checked with his team, who further confirmed Fuentebella's response. Go sent ₱1 to Borbon. He then messaged the perpetrators to "withdraw his money and use it to buy his coffin." Go then found out that they were tapped by the opposition to smear him in the 2019 Philippine general election. In conclusion, Go told the public to not fall for these types of scams.

=== Other scams ===
In 2016, JV Ejercito stated that Borbon scammed him in a tweet he uploaded three years later, on August 1, 2019, when he got arrested. Before his arrest, he scammed Cavite Vice Governor Jolo Revilla out of ₱15,000. He posed as Congressman Arnulfo Fuentebella, asking Revilla for money, stating that he lost his wallet in a trip to Coron, Palawan. He asked Revilla for ₱25,000. Upon finding out Fuentebella did not ask him for money, he requested assistance from the PNP Anti-Cybercrime Group. During Borbon's arrest, members from the House of Representatives and the Senate stated that they were also scammed by Borbon.

=== Smearing ===
In his arrest, he said that he was financed by multiple lawmakers, including Bam Aquino, Antonio Trillanes, and Gary Alejano to smear Rodrigo Duterte and his candidates during the 2019 Philippine general election. Borbon stated that he was a "popular blogger" and had 300,000 followers. He identified himself as an anti-Duterte blogger, causing the anti-Duterte candidates in the 2019 election to allegedly pay him ₱20,000 to ₱40,000 to smear the image of Duterte. Aquino and Alejano denied Borbon's accusations, asking his claims to not be dignified. His admission to smearing caused Senator Sotto to call for a law that opposes fake news. "Maraming tao ang nabibiktima ng maling balita o impormasyon," (transl. Many people are victims to fake information), said Sotto in a text message.

== Arrest ==
Really a scammer! I could attest to that! Glad that the hands of the law finally caught up with him.

— JV Ejercito,

The day before the arrest, a man was targeted in an entrapment operation by the PNP who was reportedly related to Borbon. Borbon was arrested on August 1 by the PNP. He was arrested along with another scammer. They were arrested when they were trying to withdraw the remaining money from his scam to Revilla in an ATM. In the arrest, he was revealed to know the person behind the "Ang Totoong Narcolist" (transl. The True Narcolist) videos, who was declared guilty of perjury two years later.

He was a congressional staff of the Una ang Edukasyon (1-Education) party-list in the 2019 Philippine general election. They were charged for violating Republic Act 10175, specifically for estafa. Many things were seized by Borbon and his co-conspirators, including an Oppo cellphone, a Starmobile cellphone, three Globe Telecom prepaid sim cards, a Metrobank debit card, four GCash cards, and a Commission on Elections identification card among others. During a press conference after his arrest, Edgar Bularan, his accomplice, was found to harvest lawmakers' phone numbers from the dark web and use them to call the lawmakers.

== Later scams ==
In October 2021, the National Bureau of Investigation arrested a criminal for posing as a representative of a bishop from Daet to harvest donations from senators, gaining ₱300,000 ($5,170) from Senator Tito Sotto. The office of Sotto then sought assistance from the National Bureau of Investigation. The office eventually found out that there was no bishop who wanted to seek assistance from the Roman Catholic Archdiocese of Cáceres. "Vinerify namin yung bishop sa Archdiocese ng Bicol, walang ganoong klaseng bishop." (transl. We verified the identity of the bishop with the Archdiocese of Bicol, and we found out that there was no bishop.) After an operation where officers tried to catch him, his accomplice eventually said that the mastermind was Borbon. Because of this, Borbon was charged with a case of estafa.

== See also ==
- Janet Lim-Napoles
- Ruben Ecleo Jr.
- Priority Development Assistance Fund scam
