= Salvador Panelo =

Filipino lawyer and government official

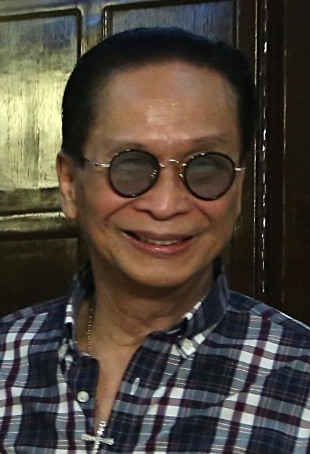
- Panelo in 2018

7th Chief Presidential Legal Counsel
- In office June 30, 2016 – October 8, 2021
- President: Rodrigo Duterte
- Preceded by: Judd H. Polloso
- Succeeded by: Jesus Melchor Quitain

Presidential Spokesperson
- In office October 15, 2018 – April 13, 2020
- President: Rodrigo Duterte
- Deputy: China Jocson
- Preceded by: Harry Roque
- Succeeded by: Harry Roque

Personal details
- Born: Salvador San Buenaventura Panelo; September 23, 1946 (age 80) Naga, Camarines Sur, Philippines
- Party: PDP
- Other political affiliations: KBL (1987–1992)
- Education: University of Nueva Caceres (BA, BA); University of the Philippines Diliman (LL.B)
- Occupation: Politician, radio journalist
- Profession: Lawyer

Salvador San Buenaventura Panelo (born September 23, 1946) is a Filipino lawyer who served as President Rodrigo Duterte's Chief Presidential Legal Counsel (2016–2021) and Presidential Spokesperson (2018–2020). He was also the legal adviser during Duterte's 2016 presidential campaign. As a private lawyer, he has handled cases involving politicians and other controversial personalities. He is a former director of the Integrated Bar of the Philippines (IBP).

Panelo unsuccessfully ran for senator thrice: in 1987 and 1992 under the party Kilusang Bagong Lipunan and later in 2022 under the party PDP–Laban. He was later named by fellow senatorial candidate Robin Padilla as his legislative adviser and mentor in the Senate.

== Early life and education ==
Panelo was born in Naga, Camarines Sur to an Ilocano father from Tubao, La Unión and a Bicolana mother from Camarines Sur. He studied elementary school at the Murphy Elementary School and high school at the Roosevelt Memorial High School (AY 1959–1962). He earned his BA in Political Science and BA English degrees at University of Nueva Cáceres. He moved to Manila to go to the University of the Philippines College of Law for his law education. As a student at the University of the Philippines Diliman and a member of the Sigma Rho fraternity, he was involved in student activism during the pre-martial law period. He stayed at the University of the Philippines and completed law school in 1971. He was admitted to the Philippine Bar on June 18, 1974.

== Career ==
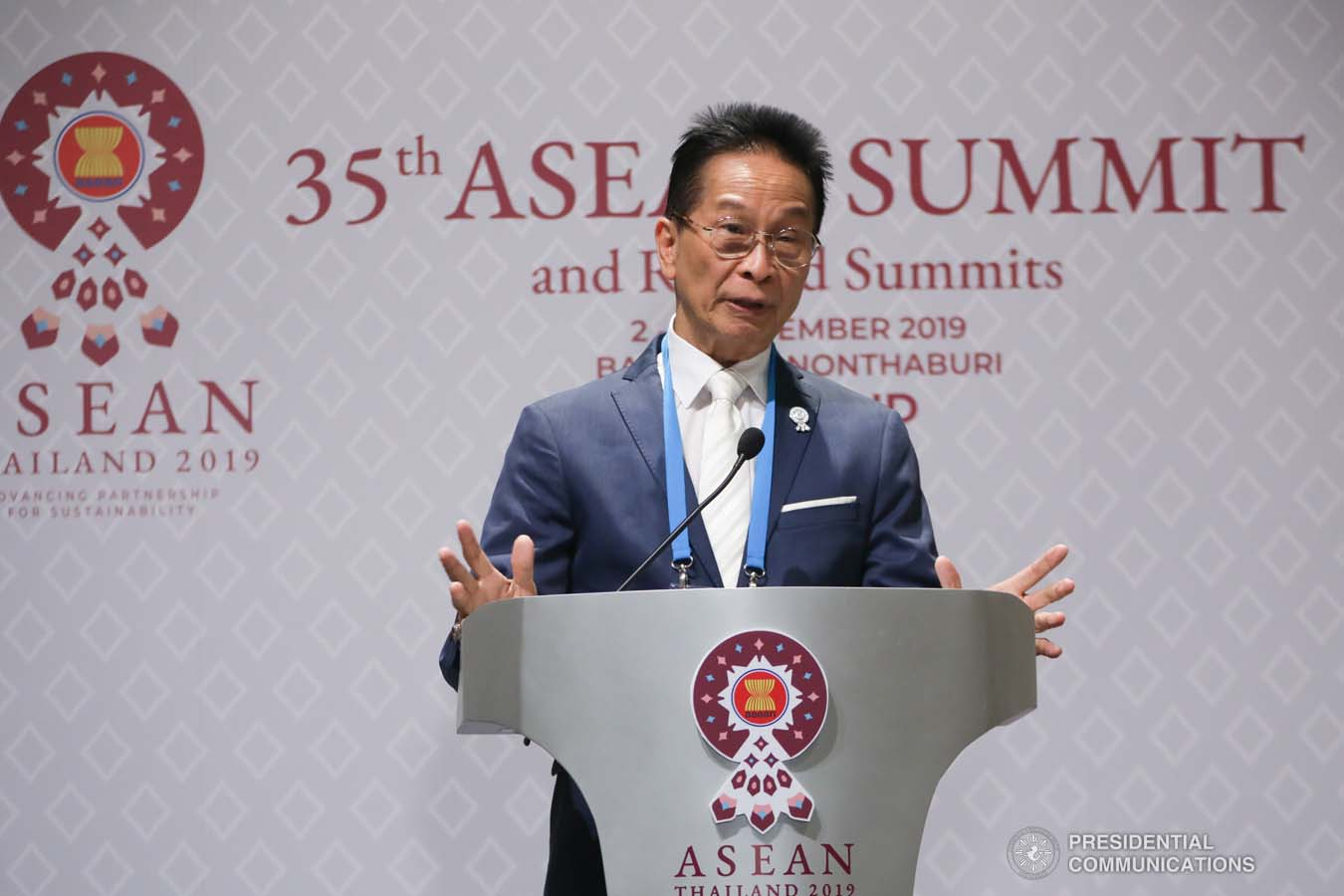
Presidential Chief Legal Counsel and Spokesperson Salvador Panelo holds a press conference for the Malacañang Press Corps at the Impact Challenger in Nonthaburi, Thailand in November 2019.

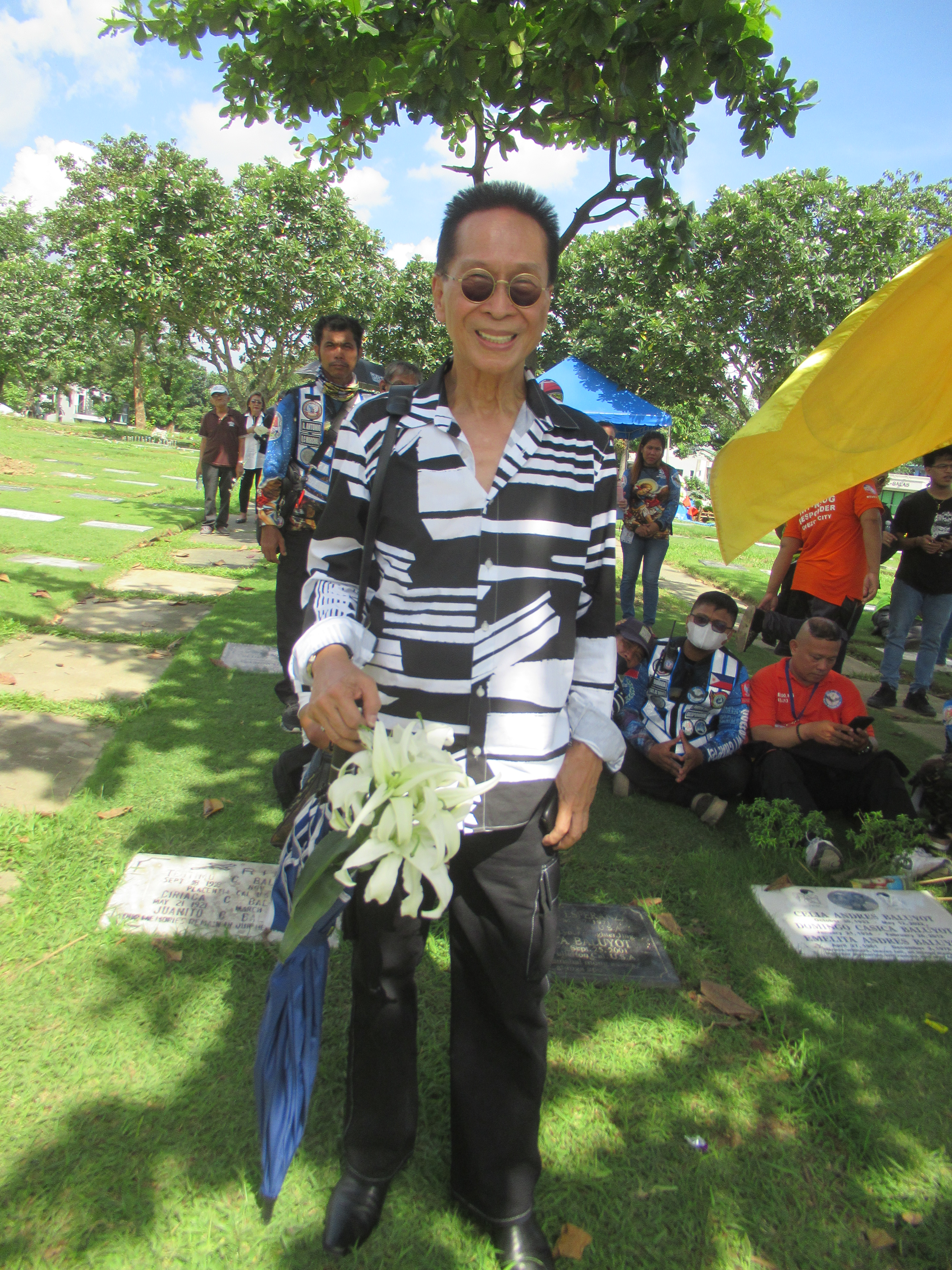
Panelo at Loyola Memorial Park, 2023

=== Early works ===
Panelo started practiced law at United Laboratories where he served as the company's legal counsel from 1977 to 1987. He assumed the directorship of the Integrated Bar of the Philippines (IBP) in 1983 and presidency of the IBP Rizal Chapter in 1985. In 1987, he was hired and worked as a radio anchor at DZEC Radyo Agila for one year. It was also in 1987 when he started his private law practice.

Panelo ran in the 1987 and 1992 Philippine Senate elections commonly under Kilusang Bagong Lipunan, with the top 24 candidates winning the election. However, he lost in both instances.

=== Private practice ===
In his 40 years of law practice, he served as the defense lawyer of prominent politicians such as Datu Unsay Mayor Andal Ampatuan Jr. who was implicated in the 2009 Maguindanao massacre, Calauan Mayor Antonio Sanchez who was tried for the 1993 Eileen Sarmenta and Allan Gomez murder, and the family of former President Ferdinand Marcos in relation to recovering their ill-gotten wealth.

Panelo also lawyered for former Commission on Elections Chairman Benjamin Abalos who was embroiled in the 2007 elections scandal, Philip Medel who was convicted in the murder of actress Nida Blanca, and the family of slain racing champion Enzo Pastor. His other clients include celebrities such as Deniece Cornejo in her 2014 rape case against actor Vhong Navarro, and Dennis Roldan who was convicted of kidnapping a Filipino-Chinese boy in 2005.

=== Duterte cabinet member ===
Prior to joining the government of Rodrigo Duterte on June 30, 2016, he was his legal counsel and defense lawyer on the charges of hidden wealth by vice presidential candidate Antonio Trillanes during the presidential campaign. He eventually served as the President-elect's transitional spokesperson before being designated as Chief Presidential Legal Counsel. On May 1, 2020, Panelo began hosting a talk show on People's Television Network (PTV) titled Counterpoint with Secretary Salvador Panelo, produced by the Presidential Broadcast Staff – Radio Television Malacañang (RTVM). Panelo created the program for the purpose of "discussing the issues affecting our country," as well as to "analyze, dissect issues raised by certain critics and others against certain policies of the government".

As the political adviser of former president Duterte, Panelo defended the pro-China clauses in the Duterte government's projects with the Chinese Communist Party. He claimed that those who pointed out the pro-China clauses, which he acknowledged as existing in the Duterte projects, are 'unpatriotic'. He afterwards turned down any debates on the matter. Panelo also defended a verbal agreement between Duterte and Xi Jinping, where the Duterte administration allowed China to access the Philippines’ exclusive economic zone. Some lawmakers have branded Panelo as a Chinese embassy spokesman for his pro-China positions.

Panelo ran and lost in the 2022 Senate election, as he did not finish in the top 12 positions. Later on, he returned to his talk show Counterpoint, now airing on Net 25. He also writes his column published weekly in The Manila Times.

=== Post-cabinet ===
Panelo has been criticized for his pro-China statements and arguments similar to statements from the Embassy of China. In 2026, after Chinese ambassador Jing Quan released statements threatening the Philippines and its rights to the West Philippine Sea, as well spreading fake news against Filipino defense and elected officials, Panelo defended Quan and criticized Filipino officials who have suggested to ban the Chinese ambassador.

Panelo is supportive of the Duterte China policy, where former president Duterte called the South China Sea Arbitration victory of the Philippines against China as a 'piece of paper' he will throw as trash. Panelo's son was recently hired as spokesman for Duterte's daughter, vice president Sara, who is also known for her pro-China statements and has been implicated for receiving through her linked corporation P319 million in remittances from China and another P150 million siphoned as “donation” by the Chinese government to Duterte's Malasakit Foundation as confirmed by the Anti–Money Laundering Council (AMLC). The corporation involved has also been confirmed as linked to the Embassy of China.

== Personal life ==
Panelo resides in Marikina. He had a son, Carlo, who died of heart complications from Down syndrome on January 6, 2017, at the age of 27. Another son of his, Salvador Jr., is the lawyer of Vice President Sara Duterte in her perjury case against Ramil Madriaga, a witness in her impeachment case.

Panelo is a member the Rotary Club of Makati Southwest chapter, a member of the Board of Trustees of the San Beda Law Alumni Association, and Secretary General of the Asean Law Association Golfers' Club.

== Electoral history ==
Electoral history of Salvador Panelo
Year	Office	Party	Votes received				Result
Year	Office	Party	Total	%	P.	Swing	Result
1987	Senator of the Philippines	KBL	393,413	1.73%	75th	—N/a	Lost
1992	Senator of the Philippines	KBL	289,416	1.19%	125th	-0.54	Lost
2022	Senator of the Philippines	PDP–Laban	4,887,066	8.80%	26th	+7.61	Lost

Political offices
Preceded by Harry Roque	Presidential Spokesperson; 2018–2020	Succeeded by Harry Roque
Legal offices
Preceded by Alfredo Caguioa	Chief Presidential Legal Counsel; 2016–2021	Succeeded by Jesus Melchor Quitain
