= Starmobile =

Filipino mobile company

- Type: Private limited company
- Industry: Consumer electronics, telecommunication
- Founded: 2011; 15 years ago
- Headquarters: Pasig, Philippines
- Key people: Joey Uy (Chairman); Ulysses Lao (President); Michael Chen (COO); Jameson Say (Director); Ivy Yeng (Director); Gerardo Elicano (EVP)
- Products: Smartphones; Mobile phones Tablet computers Network solutions E-cigarettes
- Owner: Star Telecom Alliance Resources, Inc.
- Website: www.starmobileinc.com

Starmobile was a Filipino smartphone and tablet brand based in Pasig, Philippines. It was established by Star Telecom Alliance Resources, Inc. In 2011, the company entered the mobile sector in the Philippines under the presidency of Michael Chen.

Prominent actor and comedian Vice Ganda served as an endorser for the brand during the 2010s.

== See also ==
- List of mobile phone makers by country
