= Presidential transition of Rodrigo Duterte =

2016 Philippine political process

Transition team of Rodrigo Duterte
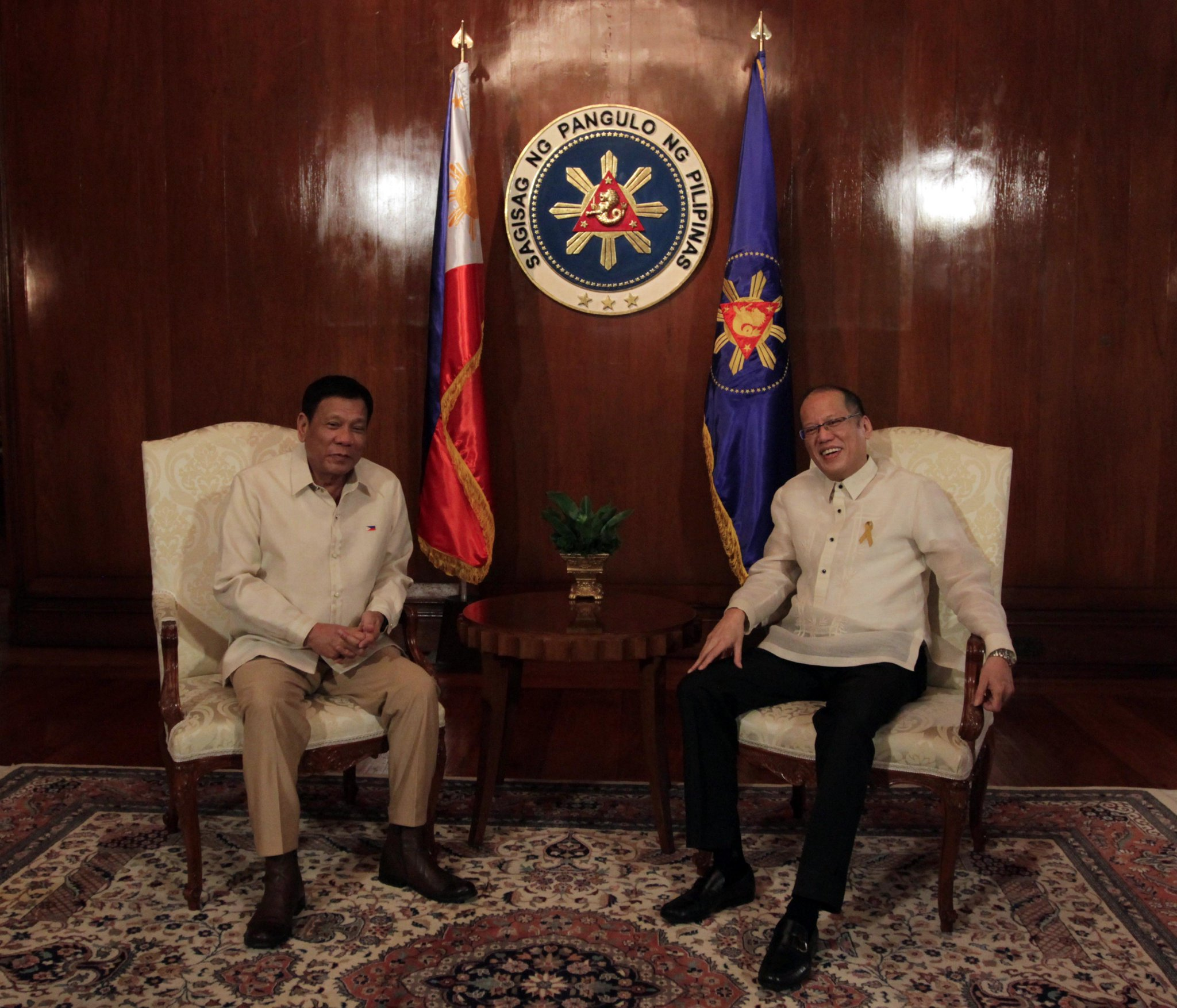
- President-elect Rodrigo Duterte (left) and outgoing President Benigno Aquino III (right) meet at the President's Hall Sala in Malacañang for a courtesy call before the formal inaugural ceremony begins
- Formation: May 9, 2016
- Type: Quasi-governmental-private
- Purpose: Peaceful and organized transfer of power
- Headquarters: Manila and Davao City
- Outgoing President of the Philippines: Benigno Aquino III
- President-elect of the Philippines: Rodrigo Duterte
- Website: https://www.officialgazette.gov.ph/featured/presidential-transition/

The presidential transition of Rodrigo Duterte started when then-Davao City mayor Rodrigo Duterte won the Philippine presidential election on May 9, 2016. Duterte topped the official count by the Congress of the Philippines on May 27, 2016, with 16,601,997 votes, 6.6 million more than his closest rival. The joint bicameral Congress proclaimed Duterte as the President-elect and Leni Robredo as the Vice President-elect on May 30, 2016.

At the time the presidential transition team was organized, Duterte was leading by a significant margin at the unofficial count by the Commission on Elections (COMELEC) and the Parish Pastoral Council for Responsible Voting (PPCRV).

The transition lasted until the day of the president-elect's inauguration on June 30, 2016.

== Transition ==
=== Duterte's transition committee ===
On May 10, 2016, the camp of presidential candidate Rodrigo Duterte announced that a transition committee had been created to handle the presidential transition of Duterte to the day of his formal inauguration as president. The committee would be composed of an overall transition committee and three sub-committees, namely a selection committee, a policy group committee and an inauguration committee. The transition team was finalized the next day and held their first meeting at the Marco Polo Hotel in Davao City.

On May 13, 2016, a transition team divided into six clusters was announced as commencing the process of selecting potential cabinet members. Duterte's spokesman, Peter Laviña, said that the division would hasten the process of receiving nominations of and suggestions for potential members of the Cabinet as well as sub-Cabinet positions and heads for the various agencies. Laviña stated that the criteria for selection include shared vision, integrity, competence, and ability and willingness to sacrifice. Bong Go, another member of the transition team, quoted Duterte that the criteria for selection for the heads of the Armed Forces of the Philippines and the Philippine National Police will be based on merits, on seniority, and on loyalty to the government and the country.

More women are being planned for Duterte's cabinet. Duterte had appointed numerous women to leadership posts when he was mayor of Davao City.

Transition team of Rodrigo Duterte by cluster
Social development	Peace and security	Economic development
Leoncio Evasco Jr.	Christopher Go	Carlos Dominguez III
Judiciary	GOCCs (Government-owned and controlled corporations)	Infrastructure development
Salvador Medialdea	Loreto Ata	Peter Laviña

=== Aquino's presidential committee ===
On May 12, 2016, the administration of President Benigno Aquino III has also created their own committee for the presidential transition of Rodrigo Duterte. The Presidential Transition Committee (PTC) is set to coordinate with Duterte's transition team and will be submitting reports to them. The Agency Focal Person of the transition body is Executive Secretary Paquito Ochoa, Jr.

Presidential Transition Committee (PTC) of President Benigno Aquino III
Paquito Ochoa, Jr. (Executive Secretary)
Agency Focal Person
- Emmanuel Esguerra (NEDA Director-General)
- Florencio Abad (Secretary of Budget and Management)
- Cesar Purisima (Secretary of Finance)
- Jose Rene Almendras (Secretary of Foreign Affairs)
- Rogelio Singson (Secretary of Public Works and Highways)
- Herminio Coloma Jr. (Secretary of the PCOO)

== Cabinet ==
Title	Name
President	Rodrigo Roa Duterte
Vice President	Maria Leonor G. Robredo
Cabinet Secretary	Leoncio B. Evasco, Jr.
Executive Secretary	Salvador Medialdea
Presidential Communications Operations Office Secretary	Martin Andanar
Presidential Spokesperson	Harry Roque
Secretary of Agrarian Reform	Rafael V. Mariano (Note: Duterte has offered the secretaryship of four departments to leftists. The following appointees are: Rafael V. Mariano – Department of Agrarian Reform; Silvestre Bello III – Department of Labor and Employment; Judy Taguiwalo – Department of Social Welfare and Development; Duterte also offered to the left the secretaryship for the Department of Environment and Natural Resources but he reconsidered the decision due to sensitive issues related to the mining industry. Duterte also stated that he would not appoint a combatant at the communist rebellion in the Philippines. All three nominees are part of the 10-people list of nominees submitted by the National Democratic Front (NDF) to Duterte. The NDF's list includes four women and their most preferred nominee for the Environment and Natural Resources secretary is Bayan Muna party-list representative, Carlos Isagani Zarate.)
Secretary of Agriculture	Manny Piñol
Secretary of Budget and Management	Benjamin Diokno
Secretary of Education	Leonor Briones
Secretary of Energy	Alfonso Cusi
Secretary of Environment and Natural Resources	Roy Cimatu
Secretary of Finance	Carlos Dominguez III
Secretary of Foreign Affairs	Teodoro Locsin
Secretary of Health	Francisco Duque
Secretary of Information and Communications Technology	Rodolfo Salalima
Secretary of the Interior and Local Government	Eduardo Año
Secretary of Justice	Menardo Guevarra
Secretary of Labor and Employment	Silvestre Bello III
Secretary of National Defense	Delfin Lorenzana
Secretary of Public Works and Highways	Mark Villar
Secretary of Science and Technology	Fortunato de la Peña
Secretary of Social Welfare and Development	Emmanuel A. Leyco -OIC
Secretary of Tourism	Bernadette Romulo-Puyat
Secretary of Trade and Industry	Ramon Lopez
Secretary of Transportation	Arthur Tugade
Special Assistant to the President/Presidential Management Staff chief	Christopher Go

=== Undersecretaries ===
Title	Name
Undersecretary of Agriculture (High Value Crops)	Evelyn Laviña
Undersecretary of the Interior and Local Government (Police Matters)	Catalino Cuy
Undersecretary of Labor and Employment	Joel Maglunsod
Undersecretary of National Defense (Civil Veterans and Retirees affairs)	Eduardo del Rosario
Undersecretary of National Defense (Finance, Ammunitions, Installations and Materials)	Raymundo de Vera Elefante
Undersecretary/Presidential Adviser on Economic Affairs and Information Technology Communications	Ramon Jacinto
Undersecretary/Presidential Adviser on Military Affairs	Arthur Tabaquero
Undersecretary of Tourism (Advocacy and Public Affairs)	Kat de Castro

=== Other officials ===
Title	Name
National Security Adviser	Hermogenes Esperon
AFP Chief of Staff	Gilbert Gapay
Bureau of Customs Chief	Rey Leonardo Guerrero
Bureau of Immigration Chief	Jaime Morente
BIR Commissioner	Cesar Dulay
BIR Deputy Commissioner	Lanee David
BIR Deputy Commissioner	Jesus Clint Aranas
Director General of the National Economic and Development Authority	Ernesto Pernia
LTFRB Chief	Atty. Martin Delgra III
LTO Chief	Edgar Galvante
National Anti-Poverty Commission Chief	Liza Maza
National Intelligence Coordinating Agency Chief	Alex Paul Monteagudo
NBI Chief	Dante Gierran
NDRRMC Chief	Ricardo Jalad
National Telecommunications Commission Chief	Gamaliel Cordoba
Presidential Adviser on the Peace Process	Jesus Dureza (adviser on the Moro conflict)
Presidential Adviser on the Peace Process	Silvestre Bello III (adviser on the communist rebellion in the Philippines; concurrently DOLE Secretary)
Presidential Adviser on the Peace Process	Prospero de Vera III (adviser on the communist rebellion in the Philippines; concurrently CHED Commissioner)
Presidential Assistant for the Visayas	Michael Diño
PAGCOR Chairman	Andrea Domingo
PAGCOR Assistant Vice President for Community Relation and Services Department	Arnell Ignacio
PDEA Chief	Aaron N. Aquino
PNP Chief	Ronald dela Rosa
Chief Presidential Legal Counsel	Salvador Panelo
Presidential Security Group Chief	Col. Lope C. Dagoy, PA
Philippine Charity Sweepstakes Office (PCSO) General Manager and Member of the Board of Directors	Alexander Balutan
Philippine Sports Commission Chairman	Butch Ramirez
Solicitor General	Jose Calida
Presidential Adviser for Sports	Dennis Uy
Chairperson of the Film Development Council of the Philippines	Liza Diño-Seguerra
Chief Operations Officer of the Tourism Promotions Board	Cesar Montano
Administrator of National Irrigation Administration	Peter Laviña
Chairperson of the National Youth Commission	Aiza Seguerra
Special Envoy to China	Fidel V. Ramos

=== Declined ===
Position	Name
Secretary of National Defense	Gilbert Teodoro
Secretary of Education	Peter Laurel
Secretary of the Interior and Local Government	Leoncio Evasco Jr.

Duterte said in a press conference on May 31, that he will not appoint a Cabinet position for Vice President Leni Robredo, saying that Robredo is from the "opposite side", and the appointment of Robredo as one of the members of his cabinet could further hurt his friendship and alliance with Senator Bongbong Marcos, Robredo's closest rival in the vice presidential election.

== International reactions ==
- Australia: On May 20, the Australian Department of Foreign Affairs and Trade released a congratulatory message saying that Australia is looking forward to work with the new Philippine government in developing the Australia–Philippines bilateral relations and "address shared regional and global challenges." The statement also said that the two countries "share similar values and interests, including a commitment to democracy, and a determination to work for peace, security and economic growth." The statement came after Duterte's controversial remarks on a rape incident on an Australian missionary during the 1989 Davao hostage crisis, which was condemned by Australian Ambassador to the Philippines Amanda Gorely and prompted Duterte to urge Australia to cut ties with the Philippines if he was elected president.
- Canada: Prime Minister Justin Trudeau called Duterte and congratulated the President-elect on his victory in the elections. Duterte apologized to Trudeau over the beheading of John Ridsdel, a Canadian taken hostage by the Abu Sayyaf Group in April.
- China: Chinese Ministry of Foreign Affairs spokesperson Hong Lei congratulated Duterte on behalf of the Chinese government during a press briefing and expressed hope for a development in China–Philippines relations under the new administration. When asked about the two countries' relations amid the territorial disputes in the South China Sea, Hong said that China "stands ready to work alongside the new Philippine government to properly deal with relevant disputes through friendly dialogue and bring bilateral ties back to the track of sound development." On May 30, President Xi Jinping sent a congratulatory message to Duterte expressing hope that China and the Philippines can "get back on the track of healthy development" and continue to enjoy their "historical friendship".
- European Union: European Council President Donald Tusk and European Commission President Jean-Claude Juncker wrote a congratulatory letter to Duterte saying that the Philippines and the European Union share a "close partnership grounded in a long history and in strong mutual interests" and expressed hope that the Philippines would support the European Union's interest in joining the East Asia Summit.
- Germany: Chancellor Angela Merkel sent a congratulatory letter to Duterte on June 1, expressing willingness to continue deepening Germany–Philippines relations, saying that the two countries' relations are characterized by friendship and trust "that includes our shared conviction that democracy, human rights, the rule of law and inclusive economic growth are indispensable for sustainable development." Merkel also expressed hope for the resolution of the Bangsamoro peace process.
- Israel: Israeli Ambassador to the Philippines Effie Ben Matityau congratulated Duterte during a speech on May 12. Matityau said that Israel is looking forward to developing their "special friendship" with the Philippines through the Duterte administration, saying that the Israel–Philippines relations is special because it started before the two countries became fully independent.
- Japan: Prime Minister Shinzo Abe through his special advisor Katsuyuki Kawai congratulated president-elect Duterte for his victory in the 2016 elections. Japan also expressed their support to the Philippine government's decision to elevate the case on the territorial dispute in the South China Sea in the International Arbitral Tribunal.
- Singapore: President Tony Tan and Prime Minister Lee Hsien Loong both wrote letters to Duterte congratulating him on his victory. In his letter, President Tan expressed confidence that Duterte would lead the economy of the Philippines into "greater heights" and extended an invitation for the president-elect to visit Singapore after he is inaugurated. Prime Minister Lee wrote to wish Duterte "good health and success in his position" and expressed interest in working with him "for the benefit of their countries, peoples and ASEAN."
- South Korea: South Korean Ambassador to the Philippines Kim Jae-shin paid a visit to Duterte in Davao City on June 2 to congratulate him and discuss the expansion of Philippines–South Korea relations, saying: "We hope under his leadership, the Philippines will continue to develop further and further. We want to expand our bilateral relations. Both countries will cooperate in a mutually beneficial way." Kim also said that the South Korean government vowed to assist Duterte in achieving his anti-crime policies by donating patrol cars and motorcycles worth $6.6 million.
- United States: President Barack Obama was the first foreign head of state or government to greet Duterte, calling him over the phone to congratulate him over his victory in the election. Duterte and Obama reaffirmed the close relationship between the Philippines and United States.

In a press conference held in his hometown, Davao City, on May 31, 2016, President-elect Duterte answered a question regarding the slay of journalists by stating that it has been corrupt journalists who have become targets for assassination. He further stated that journalists are not exempted by assassins simply by virtue of their being journalists. He also said there was no excuse for journalists who engaged in corrupt activities and took bribes.

Duterte's statements became controversial after media groups expressed outrage towards the President-elect the following day. Killings of journalists in the past were cited, particularly those of 58 journalists killed by a political clan in Maguindanao in 2009, along with those of a recorded 176 journalists murdered since the corruption-plagued Martial Law era under Ferdinand Marcos, the total of which has marked the Philippines as one of the most dangerous countries in the world for journalists to work in. Furthermore, Duterte's controversial statement was made three days after another journalist was shot dead by two unidentified men in Manila.

As a result of the controversy and a consequent suggestion by an international journalists group to the Philippine media to boycott Duterte's press conferences, Duterte in turn stated that he will no longer grant interviews to journalists from the privately owned media organizations until the end of his term in 2022 and instead air announcements and press releases through Government-owned People's Television Network (PTV Channel 4), expressly to avoid queries that could elicit soundbite statements from him that would result in further controversy, with Duterte adding that he does not need the private media. However, this was only lasted for 2 months, after the now-President Duterte hold a press conference with journalists at the Malacañang Palace on August 1, 2016.

== See also ==
- Rodrigo Duterte presidential campaign, 2016
- Inauguration of Rodrigo Duterte
- Presidency of Rodrigo Duterte
