= Rodrigo Duterte 2016 presidential campaign =

Presidential campaign

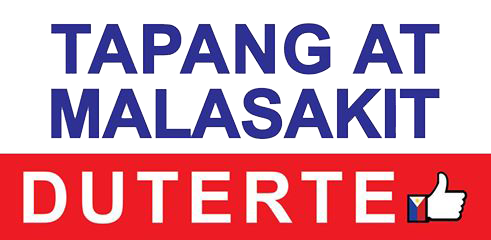
- Campaign: 2016 Philippine presidential election
- Candidate: Rodrigo Duterte; Mayor of Davao City (1988–1998; 2001–2010; 2013–2016); Alan Peter Cayetano; Senator (2007–2017)
- Affiliation: PDP–Laban
- Status: Announced: November 21, 2015; Launched: November 30, 2015; Won election: May 9, 2016
- Headquarters: EDSA, Makati, Metro Manila
- Key people: List of key people: Leoncio Evasco Jr. (campaign manager); John Henry Delfino (campaign strategist); Christopher "Bong" Go (executive assistant); Carlos "Sonny" Dominguez III (finance head); Butch Ramirez (advance party head); Danilo Dayanghirang (parallel groups coordinator); Peter Laviña (media relations head, spokesperson); Lito Banayo (communications and strategy adviser)
- Slogan(s): Tapang at Malasakit (lit. Courage and Compassion); Matapang na solusyon, Mabilis na aksyon (lit. Fearless solutions, fast action); Change is Coming; Atin 'to P're! (lit. This is ours, pal!)
- Chant: Duterte! Duterte! Cayetano! DuCay!

Website
- www.dutertecayetano.com

The 2016 presidential campaign of Rodrigo Duterte was announced on November 21, 2015. Rodrigo Duterte, who was then serving as Mayor of Davao City, had refused to run and turned down other presidential and vice-presidential aspirants' offers to be his running mate, including that of Jejomar Binay, Miriam Defensor-Santiago and Bongbong Marcos. He was eventually elected President of the Philippines. Duterte's positions was seen to have resonated with older, working class Filipinos, particularly his promise to eliminate the wide-scale drug menace of the country and his harsh stances on crime in Davao City, which he served for more than 22 years, and corruption. Duterte's campaign also emphasized an anti-establishment tone, accusing political elites based in Manila of not doing much to solve problems in a move that was described as populist.

== Background ==
=== Calls to run for presidency and negotiations ===
In his speech during the change-of-command ceremony of the Philippine National Police, then-candidate Duterte credited former president Fidel Ramos as his inspiration. Ramos was the first person who flew to Davao City to ask Duterte to run for president.

In February 2014, Duterte had gained support from netizens lauding his performance as mayor of Davao, especially in maintaining order. Some suggested that he run for president, but Duterte stated that he felt he was not qualified for a higher public office.

Early in 2015, Duterte hinted to the media of his intent to run for the presidency in 2016, with the promise of abolishing Congress in favor of a parliament should he win. In February that year, Duterte said in a Baguio federalism forum that he would only run for president "if (it is) to save the republic." Duterte cited the need for about 10 to 15 billion pesos for a campaign war chest as what was keeping him from running. Days later, however, Duterte "re-entered" PDP–Laban; he maintained that he never left the party, and only had to stand under the local party banner, Hugpong sa Tawong Lungsod, in the 2013 local election in order to ensure his victory. PDP–Laban president Aquilino Pimentel III later said that Duterte was among his party's options for a presidential candidate for 2016, noting that the party's position on federalism coincides with Duterte's advocacy. A few days after reports came out saying incumbent Vice-President Jejomar Binay (a presidential aspirant) was eyeing Duterte as his possible running mate, Duterte issued a statement saying that he was not interested in running for a national post.

In September 2014, Duterte declined presidential aspirant and then-incumbent senator Miriam Defensor-Santiago's offer to be her running mate, saying that instead of picking him as the senator's running mate, she could ask former Defense Secretary Gilberto Teodoro, Jr. In March 2015, Lakas–CMD national president Ferdinand Martin Romualdez announced that his party was preparing for the 2016 elections; incumbent congressman Danilo Suarez remarked that they were convincing Teodoro to come out of retirement and run anew for a higher office. In October 2015, Santiago chose Bongbong Marcos as her running mate.

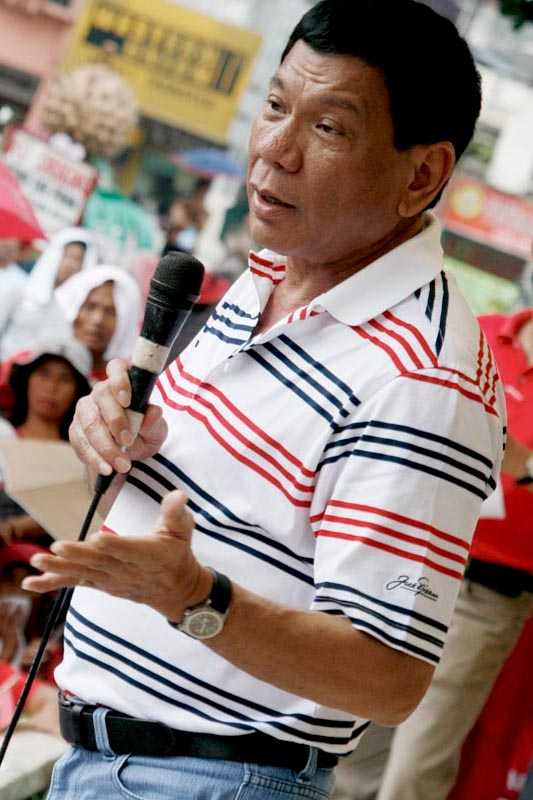
Rodrigo Duterte

Later, during the airing of his weekly program, Gikan Sa Masa, Para Sa Masa, on a local channel on June 21, 2015, Duterte stated that he was considering suggestions from his friends and supporters to run for president. He also added that he would stop expressing non-interest in starting a presidential campaign.

At the ASIA CEO Forum in Makati held on June 25, 2015, Duterte again stated that he would not run for a national office, and said that he never desired to do so. A month later, however, Duterte, responding to Justice Secretary Leila de Lima's statement that she would not run with Duterte as a matter of principle, saying that he would campaign against the Liberal Party if De Lima is drafted, calling her "hypocritical" and her principles "rotten".

In August, while at a meeting with military officers, Duterte spoke with Communist Party of the Philippines (CPP) founder Jose Maria Sison. Duterte said that he told Sison that he would run for president if the CPP's armed wing, the New People's Army, abandoned its over-40-year insurgency, saying, "Armed struggle as a means to achieve change is passe in the modern world we are living in today." Duterte disclosed that Sison was asking him about his plans for 2016; Duerte denied having any.

On September 7, 2015, in a press conference held at Davao City, Duterte declared he would not be running for president in 2016 and apologized to all of his supporters on the decision. He additionally stated that he might retire from politics after his term as mayor of Davao City ends in 2016 and if his daughter ran for the office. Other factors in his possible retirement included age, health concerns and his family's objections. Mixed reactions erupted on social media hours after the declaration and several supporters still continued to petition online, urging the mayor to revert his decision.

On September 26, 2015, a large number of supporters gathered at the Quirino Grandstand in Rizal Park, Manila, to urge Duterte to run for the presidency in 2016. The gathering was dubbed "The Million People March" by the media, but its followers preferred to call it "The People's Call". Despite being an undeclared candidate, Pulse Asia Research Director Ana Tabunda still considered Duterte "a serious contender" as he was already ranked fourth in a presidential survey done by Pulse Asia from late August to early September as well as in a then-recent Social Weather Stations survey. He was behind announced and declared candidates Grace Poe, Mar Roxas and Jejomar Binay. Duterte's long-time political rival and critic, former Speaker of the House of Representatives Prospero Nograles, also expressed his support for Duterte if ever the latter decided to run for the presidency. On October 13, 2015, in a press conference held at a local hotel in Davao City, Duterte finalized his decision not to run for the presidency, with his daughter Sara's objection being pointed out as one of the main contributors.

On October 15, 2015, Duterte's authorized representative, Christopher "Bong" Go, filed Duterte's certificate of candidacy (COC) on the former's behalf at the Commission on Elections (Comelec) office in Manila for a re-election bid as mayor of Davao. A music video with a disclaimer that it was "non-paid" entitled "Takbo" (Run in English) was uploaded on the same day by rap artist Njel de Mesa, with a theme to urge Duterte to run for the presidency. The song was composed by singer Jimmy Bondoc and featured various artists including Bondoc and de Mesa, Luke Mejares, Paolo Santos, Pido Lalimarmo, Thor, Gail Blanco and other OPM artists. Bondoc then stated that he would offer to write another song if the mayor finally decides to join the presidential race in 2016.

==== Filing of COC by Martin Diño as PDP–Laban's presidential bet ====
On the afternoon of October 16, Duterte's daughter, Sara, announced via social media that she had filed her candidacy for mayor of Davao City. Her post suggested that her father would withdraw his mayoral candidacy and seek election to higher office. Reportedly, hundreds of supporters rallied at the Comelec office waiting for Duterte to file his candidacy before the 5:00 pm cut-off. On the same day, Martin Diño, an anti-crime activist and barangay captain from Quezon City, filed his candidacy for president. Diño was a member of PDP–Laban, the same party advocating the federalist system which Duterte proposed. Diño clarified that there was a "clerical error" on his submitted COC (running for Pasay mayor instead of president). In their general meeting held in Pasay on October 26, members of PDP–Laban expressed their support to Diño in his presidential bid.

On October 26, 2015, Duterte said in an interview that his deadline for deciding whether to seek the presidency was December 10. He also warned the people to abide by the law if he wins. Two days later, PDP–Laban standard bearer Martin Diño withdrew his presidential bid and named Duterte as his substitute because there was a possibility that Diño might be declared a nuisance candidate by the COMELEC. On October 30, an alleged campaign video of Duterte and Cayetano circulated on social media that put hopes on Duterte's candidacy as Cayetano's running mate. However, Duterte's aide Bong Go said in an interview that Duterte's mind had not changed yet but that he would continue soul-searching with his family to know if he would run in the upcoming election. On November 1, Duterte said that nothing had changed and that he was not fit for national office. He also said that he was still waiting for a communication from his party about his possible candidacy; Duterte would also wait if his daughter would agree to substitute for him at the mayoral race of Davao and would retire from public service if Sara agreed to do so. On November 2, Parish Pastoral Council for Responsible Voting (PPCRV) executive Arwin Serrano said that Diño was deemed to face an election sabotage complaint because of proposing Duterte as his substitute for him; however, Diño denied allegations that his filing of candidacy was just a front to pave the way for Duterte's possible substitution. Comelec chairman Andres Bautista, in an interview on November 3, stated that although they have noted Diño's withdrawal, they would not move with any further action with regards to a possible substitution until they had Duterte's consent and unless it would be made official with a COC and a certificate of nomination and acceptance from PDP–Laban. Duterte himself then further clarified that his decision of acceptance for the substitution offer would be on the deadline itself come December 10.

=== Official acceptance for substitution ===
On November 21, in a gathering held in his alma mater San Beda College, Duterte announced his presidential bid and also finally accepted Alan Peter Cayetano's offer to be his running mate. Duterte said he was disappointed over the decision made by the Senate Electoral Tribunal (SET) regarding Grace Poe's citizenship as well as the current administration's handling of the 'laglag-bala' issue. Duterte further stated that he would file his candidacy immediately after he reached out to his party.

== Campaign ==
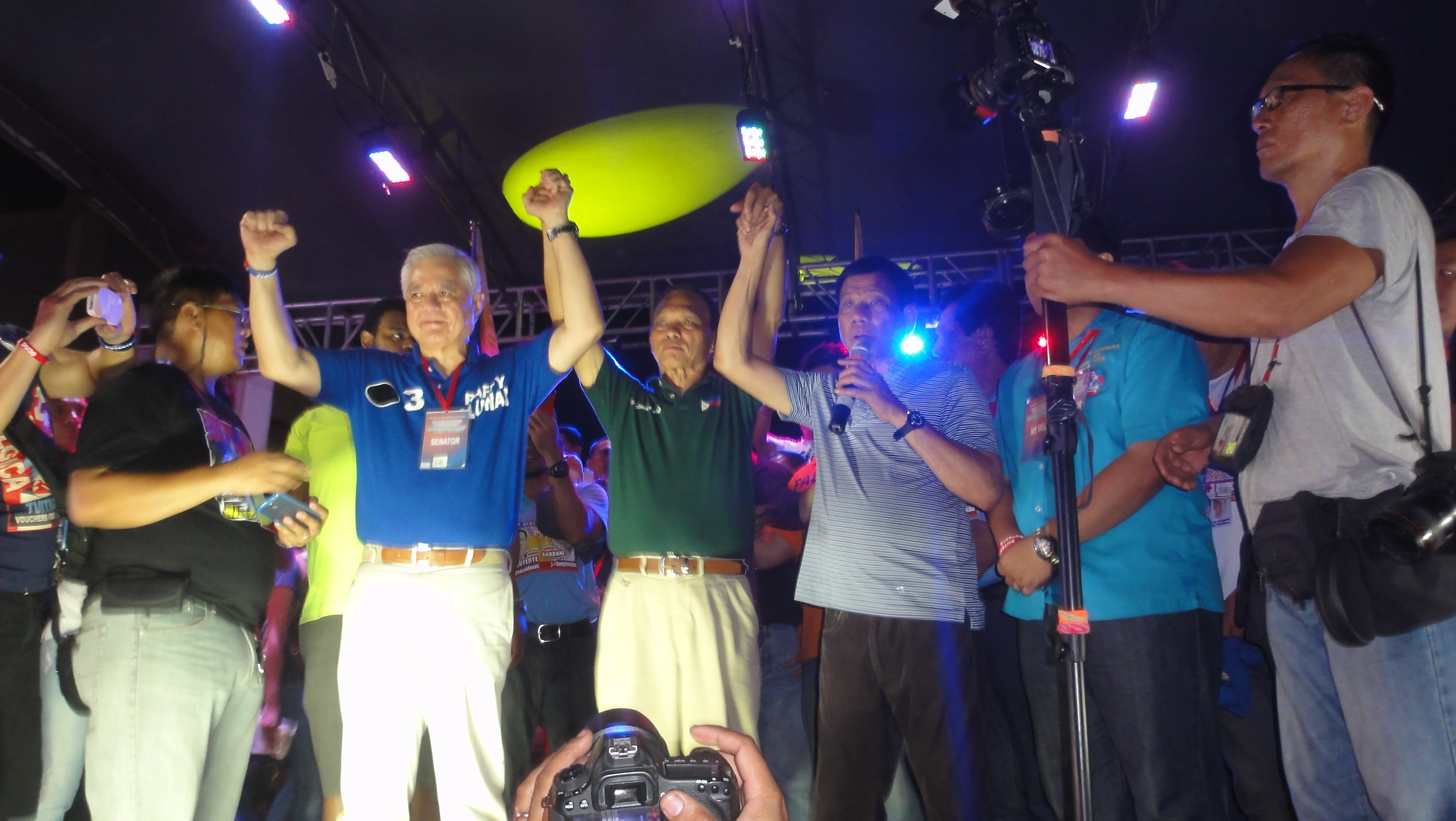
Duterte and allies campaigning in Pandacan, Manila

Duterte topped all other presidentiables including former front-runner Grace Poe in a survey published November 25 and held by Pulse Asia. Poe said that the survey was "inconclusive" and "not reflective" and claimed it was made by Duterte's camp.

On November 29, 2015, the supporters of Duterte and Cayetano held an event named "MAD for Change: Tunog ng Pagbabago" (lit. MAD for Change: Sound of Change) in Taguig. It included free-head shaving, free T-shirt printing services, and the main concert. Several musicians performed, including Jimmy Bondoc, Thor, and Luke Mejares. Duterte arrived in the event together with his running mate Cayetano. On November 30, the PDP–Laban declared Duterte and Cayetano as the party's standard bearers and launched their campaign in a gathering held in Century Park Hotel in Manila.

Duterte and Cayetano kicked off their campaigns with a proclamation rally held in the suburb area of Tondo in Manila on February 9, 2016, the start of the 90-day campaign period for national candidates. The rally was aired on national television through Sonshine Media Network International, the television network of Duterte's friend pastor Apollo Quiboloy.

Duterte and Cayetano went to different places across the country to court people and convince them to be their choices in the May 9 polls.

A week before the elections, the Iglesia ni Cristo, known for its bloc voting, announced that they endorsed Duterte's candidacy.

=== Running mate ===
On September 29, 2015, incumbent senator Alan Peter Cayetano declared his intention to run for the 2016 vice-presidential post in a press event held in Davao City and considered Duterte his first choice as running mate for the presidential post; this eventually led to a meeting between the two parties. A day after meeting with Cayetano, Duterte met with another incumbent senator, Bongbong Marcos, who also went to Davao City to talk to Duterte. Marcos was reportedly considering running for the vice-presidential post as well; Marcos had not yet made any proclamation at that time. As in the Cayetano meeting, Duterte still declared that he was not running for president.

On November 21, Duterte decided to join the presidential polls and proclaimed Cayetano as his running mate.

Other groups such as Pwersa ng Bayaning Atleta party-list, are supporting the "AlDuB" tandem (Alyansang Duterte-Bongbong) between Duterte and Marcos.

== Political positions ==
After declaring himself a candidate, Duterte focused his rhetoric on fighting corruption, crime, and drug abuse. He has been described as a "populist" and "socialist", positioning himself not just against the ruling party but against the current political system as a whole. His campaign has been heavily supported by older working class Filipinos.

=== Federalism ===
Duterte advocates federalism as a better system of governance for the Philippines. He argues that regions outside Metro Manila receive unfairly small budgets from the Internal Revenue Allotment. For example, of the ₱5 billion Davao sends monthly to Metro Manila, only ₱2–3 billion ever returns. He also highlights that the money remitted to the national government is misused by corrupt politicians in Congress.

=== Social policies ===
==== Abortion and contraception issues ====
Duterte does not believe that contraception is inherently morally wrong and advocates for government-promoted efforts to expand access to contraceptive services. He wishes to maintain laws against abortion in the Philippines, arguing that abortion involves the taking of a sovereign human life.

==== Conditional cash transfers ====
Duterte promised that the Pantawid Pamilyang Pilipino Program, a conditional cash transfer program started during the administration of President Gloria Macapagal Arroyo, would continue if he were elected.

==== LGBT rights ====
Duterte criticized boxer Manny Pacquiao after the latter's controversial comments about LGBT couples being "worse than animals", stating that the boxer did not have the right to judge others in such a manner. Duterte has also advocated in support of anti-discrimination measures to protect LGBT individuals in his capacity as a mayor. He has remarked that, in his view, "The universe is ruled by the law of a God who is forgiving, merciful, compassionate and loving, the same God who created all of us equal".

In terms of the legalization of same-sex marriage, Duterte stated in January 2016 that he feels sympathetic to LGBT people on the issue while still believing that he should not push against the current legal code of the Philippines. He noted that law depicts the matter in terms of religious doctrine and intermingles secular marriage with sacramental holy matrimony, which traditionally is only between one man and one woman. He stressed his feelings of affection for his LGBT friends and family members though indicating his agreement with traditions.

==== Public order ====
Duterte stated that he believed that an efficient and effective military and police constituted the most important part of the nation's security. To aid in this goal, he announced that he planned to increase the salary of the military and police to give them dignity and dissuade them from bribe-taking.

=== Economic policy ===
==== Industrialization ====
To create jobs, Duterte proposes to build/rebuild industries and their factories. In particular, he believes the most important step towards industrialization is to revive the Philippines' steel industry.

==== Comprehensive Agrarian Reform Program ====
Duterte opposes any move to amend the Constitution of the Philippines to allow foreigners to own lands in the Philippines.

==== Taxation ====
Duterte has said that a monthly income of ₱25,000 or less should be exempted from income taxes. A simplified tax collection system and privatization of the Bureau of Internal Revenue and other government collection agencies are also among his proposals. However, Duterte has also said he is against income tax reduction.

==== Foreign investments ====
Duterte proposes the creation of designated "business islands" as economic zones to encourage foreign investment and create jobs. To aid in attracting investors, he wants to make economic policies and laws simple and believable. He stresses that travel overseas to find jobs should become a choice rather than continue as a necessity.

=== Foreign policy ===
==== Chinese activities in the Spratly Islands ====
Duterte, contrary to current Philippine government policy, has said he is open to bilateral talks with China when it comes to the maritime dispute centered on the Chinese claim to the Spratly Islands. He is supportive of the Philippines' arbitration case against China at the Permanent Court of Arbitration, but has said that a non-confrontational and less formal approach to China would be more effective in coming to an agreement. He has also said that the Philippines should revert to the previous position to agree to explore jointly the disputed areas with other countries like China, Vietnam, Malaysia, Brunei and Taiwan for resources such as oil, gas and other minerals.

==== Visiting Forces Agreement with the United States ====
Duterte has said that if Filipinos could not get their fair share in the justice system with the Visiting Forces Agreement and Enhanced Defense Cooperation Agreement, signed between the governments of the Philippines and the United States in 2014, then these agreements should be revoked.

== Controversies ==
=== Disqualification cases ===
A few hours after the COC filing for president of Duterte, radio broadcaster Ruben Castor filed a disqualification petition before the COMELEC against Duterte. On December 21, disqualified presidential candidate Rizalito David of Ang Kapatiran party filed a petition before the commission to declare Duterte's substitution for Diño null and void.

The legality of Duterte's substitution for Diño was questioned by some electoral lawyers because of an error made in Diño's certificate of candidacy that made him a Pasay mayoral bet despite being a resident of Quezon City. Because of the issue, rumors circulated that presidential aspirant Miriam Defensor-Santiago was willing to give way for Duterte by letting him substitute for her. However, Defensor-Santiago said that she would not back down from the race even though she has a high regard for Duterte. Another presidential aspirant Roy Señeres also opened the possibility he would allow Rodrigo Duterte as his substitute candidate if he will abide in three conditions, particularly being an opponent of women's right to abortion care. However, Señeres later refused to substitute for him and slammed Duterte's decision to pursue the presidency and remarked Duterte should support and endorse him instead.

The validity of Duterte's substitution was further assessed by Comelec and on December 7, Comelec rejected a petition to name Martin Diño a "nuisance" candidate.

Voting 6–1, the COMELEC En Banc approved on December 17 the substitution of Duterte (from Diño) as the candidate of the PDP–Laban in the 2016 polls. On December 22, JP Delas Nieves, chairman of the UP Diliman University Student Council, filed the third disqualification case against Duterte before the COMELEC.

In a decision issued February 3, 2016, the COMELEC's first division unanimously denied all filed disqualification petitions against the presidential candidacy of Duterte due to lack of any merit. The first division also stated that Diño is not a nuisance candidate and his substitution to Duterte is valid.

=== Controversial remarks ===
On December 2, 2015, Duterte received criticism for cursing at Pope Francis because the Pope caused traffic congestion in Metro Manila during his visit in January 2015. He claimed that his outburst was a result of a molestation incident against him by a priest during his childhood. He immediately apologized through the media, saying he was not "cursing" the Pope but rather the government's way of preparing for the Pope's visit. Duterte later apologized to the pontiff by writing a letter to Pope Francis dated January 21, 2016. During a campaign rally in Ubay, Bohol, Duterte's camp showed a letter coming from the Vatican's Secretariat of State, signed by Giovanni Angelo Becciu dated February 24, stating that Pope Francis has received his letter and that the Vatican appreciates Duterte's apology after cursing Pope Francis in public.

During a tourism forum that was attended by Duterte, Alan Peter Cayetano, and the Mexican Ambassador to the Philippines, Julio Camarena Villaseñor, Duterte described Mexico "as a place where kidnappings and killings are rife and therefore not fit for tourists".

During a campaign rally, Duterte made a joke about a friend who is physically disabled and a senior citizen. He implied that because of their condition, his friend should just commit suicide. This was met with criticism from disabled rights advocates.

==== Rape during 1989 Davao hostage crisis ====
During a campaign event on April 17, 2016, Duterte made controversial remarks about a rape that occurred during a hostage-taking incident in Davao City in 1989. One of the hostages was raped prior to being killed. At his rally, Duterte told the crowd, "Was I mad because she was raped? Yes, that's one of the reasons. But she really was beautiful. The mayor should have been first." The crowd reacted with laughter. A video recording of the remarks went viral.

In the aftermath, Duterte was criticized by women's groups, netizens, and the Christian missionary group victimized by the hostage-taking, and several officials. Presidential candidate Grace Poe called him "distasteful and unacceptable", while another candidate Mar Roxas said Duterte "should not hold power", and Jejomar Binay urged voters not to vote for him. Miriam Santiago said Duterte "crossed the line" with the remark, but also recognized the freedom of expression of Duterte and critics of his remarks. American ambassador Philip Goldberg and Australian ambassador Amanda Gorely both criticized him for the comments. Feminist group GABRIELA Women's Party condemned the presidential candidate saying that "rape is a serious crime".

Duterte later said that he regretted his "gutter language" but would not apologize for what he said. He insisted that the remark was not a "joke" but a "narrative", and said he made the remark out of "utter anger" when he recalled the incident. Duterte criticized women's groups who spoke out about his remarks. Duterte also criticized Goldbert and Gorely for their response, and urged the United States and Australia to cut ties with the Philippines if he was elected president.

Following the comments, his daughter Sara Duterte posted on Instagram that she had also been a victim of rape. Rodrigo Duterte dismissed his daughter's statement, referring to her as a "drama queen".

=== Annulment psychological report ===
An alleged report states his annulment from Elizabeth Zimmerman was caused by his alleged narcissistic and anti-social personality disorder. The report also alleges that his violent behavior and his womanizing attitude was the cause of the annulment.

=== Alleged links to the Communist Party of the Philippines ===
The administration of Benigno Aquino III warned voters that they should be alarmed that Duterte may be involved with the Communist Party of the Philippines and its militant wing the New People's Army. This was a day after captive police officers was released by the militants to the mayor. Exiled NPA founder Joma Sison was a former teacher of Duterte and spoke kindly of his former student, having previously endorsed his candidacy.

=== Alleged hidden wealth ===
On April 27, 2016, vice presidential candidate Antonio Trillanes claimed that Duterte had a bank account worth ₱211 million that he did not declare on his legally mandated statements of assets and liabilities. Duterte said that Trillanes was trying to get attention to improve his ratings in surveys, which were poor. Alan Peter Cayetano, Duterte's running mate, said that it was just a smear campaign against Duterte and accused Trillanes of doing this under the orders of presidential candidate Grace Poe, who denied any involvement. Both Jejomar Binay and Mar Roxas criticized Duterte for failing to sign a waiver and reveal the contents of the accounts. On April 29, Miriam Defensor Santiago joined in attacking Duterte about the alleged contents of bank accounts.

He also challenged Trillanes to name his source and file an affidavit to legalize his accusations.

Documents from Antonio Trillanes claim that the Duterte political family owns properties around Davao City, elsewhere in Mindanao and also in Metro Manila, none of which were revealed by the mayor in his statement of assets and liabilities and net worth.

However, Duterte assumed that all the documents provided were falsified. He also questioned the timing of the accusation because they came less than two weeks before the election. However, the certificate did not include transaction history of the account that covers the date where the deposits happened. When pressed on why they won't show the transaction history or the balance as of the date in question (March 28), Duterte laid the blame on the bank on not certifying something which is non-existing, perhaps, the account was not yet opened prior to that date.

=== Authoritarian tendencies ===
Some allege that Duterte plans to establish a "revolutionary government" similar to a dictatorship. Duterte has said that he will close the Congress of the Philippines if it tries to impeach him. A religious leader, Apollo Quiboloy, supporting Duterte says that there will be a "revolution." Duterte has said that he plans to pardon himself for mass murder, as well as issue additional pardons to policemen and soldiers accused of abusing human rights.

== Endorsements ==
Rodrigo Duterte

Current and former Philippine senators

- Edgardo Angara, former senator (1987–98, 2001–13) and 16th President of the Senate (1993–95)
- Alan Peter Cayetano, incumbent senator (2007–present), vice presidential running mate
- Pia Cayetano, incumbent senator (2004–present), sister of running mate
- John Henry Osmeña, former senator (1971–72, 1987–95, 1998–2004) and mayor of Toledo, Cebu
- Aquilino Pimentel Jr., former senator (1987–92, 1998–2010) and 23rd President of the Senate (2000–01)
- Aquilino Pimentel III, incumbent senator (2011–present)
- Manny Villar, former senator (2001–13), 25th President of the Senate (2006–08), and 2010 presidential candidate

Current and former Philippine representatives

- Eric Galo P. Acuña, former Pangasinan representative*
- Lino Edgardo Cayetano, representative from Taguig
- Florencio Flores, Jr., 2nd district representative of Bukidnon
- Gwendolyn Garcia, 3rd district representative of Cebu, former Governor of Cebu and founder of One Cebu
- Luzviminda Ilagan, representative from Gabriela party-list
- Antonio Lagdameo, Jr., 2nd district representative of Davao del Norte
- Amado Bagatsing, 5th district representative of Manila
- Antonio Floriendo, Jr, former 2nd district representative of Davao del Norte
- Benasing Macarambon, Jr., former Lanao del Sur representatative.
- Prospero Nograles, 22nd Speaker of the House of Representatives (2008–10) and representative from Davao City
- Karlo Alexei Nograles, representative from Davao City
- Martin Romualdez, representative from Leyte
- Rogelio Neil P. Roque, 4th district representative of Bukidnon
- Jose Zubiri III, 3rd district representative of Bukidnon
- Damian Mercado, lone district representative of Southern Leyte
- Rufus Rodriguez, representative of Cagayan de Oro

Current and former governors and vice governors

- Homobono Adaza, former Governor of Misamis Oriental
- Jose Chaves Alvarez, Governor of Palawan
- Rodolfo del Rosario, Governor of Davao del Norte
- Nestor Fongwan, Governor of Benguet
- Roger Mercado, Governor of Southern Leyte
- Nur Misuari, former Governor of the Autonomous Region in Muslim Mindanao and founder of Moro National Liberation Front (MNLF)
- Emilio Osmeña, former Governor of Cebu and founder of Promdi
- Manny Piñol, former Governor of Cotabato
- Charito Plaza, former Governor of Agusan del Norte
- Juanito Victor Remulla, Governor of Cavite
- Mike Sueno, former Governor of South Cotabato
- Jose Maria Zubiri Jr., current Governor of Bukidnon

Current and former cabinet officials

- Pantaleon Alvarez, 34th Secretary of Transportation and Communications (2001–02)
- Silvestre Bello III, 48th Secretary of Justice (1991–92, 1998), representative from 1-Bap Party-List
- Jose Calida, former Department of Justice undersecretary

Current and former mayors and municipal officials

- Omar "Solitario" Ali, former mayor of Marawi
- Pedro R. Alvarez, mayor of Baungon, Bukidnon
- Demosthenes H. Arabaca, mayor of Magallanes, Agusan del Norte
- Greco Belgica, former Manila councilor and senatorial candidate
- Ramon M. Calo, mayor of Carmen, Agusan del Norte
- Reuben Canoy, former mayor of Cagayan de Oro
- Lani Cayetano, current mayor of Taguig, wife of running mate
- Ren-Ren Cayetano, former member of the Muntinlupa council, brother of running mate
- Ernie M. Ceniza, mayor of Remedios T. Romualdez, Agusan del Norte
- Dale B. Corvera, mayor of Cabadbaran, Agusan del Norte
- Enrico Corvera, mayor of Nasipit, Agusan del Norte
- Fruto Alexis B. Dandasan, mayor of Dangcagan, Bukidnon
- Johnny delos Reyes, mayor of Talisay, Cebu
- Mauricio Domogan, current mayor of Baguio
- Paolo Duterte, son and vice mayor of Davao City
- Sara Duterte, daughter and former mayor of Davao City
- Fidel E. Garcia Jr., mayor of Tubay, Agusan del Norte
- Azucena P. Huervas, mayor of Valencia, Bukidnon
- Renante I. Inocando, mayor of Cabanglasan, Bukidnon
- Zenaida Corro Lim, mayor of Santiago, Agusan del Norte
- Felix S. Manzano, mayor of Don Carlos, Bukidnon
- Aristotle E. Montante, mayor of Kitcharao, Agusan del Norte
- Jasmin Flores Monton, mayor of Jabonga, Agusan del Norte
- Kit Nieto, mayor of Cainta, Rizal
- Rosalita Nuñez, former mayor of General Santos
- Tomas Osmeña, former mayor of Cebu City
- Edgardo Pamintuan Sr., mayor of Angeles, Pampanga
- Franklin M. Quijano, former mayor of Iligan
- Ronnel Rivera, mayor of General Santos
- Joselito Roble, mayor of Buenavista, Agusan del Norte
- Avelina S. Rosales, mayor of Las Nieves, Agusan del Norte
- Maloney Samaco, mayor of Maasin
- Arleigh Sitoy, mayor of Cordova, Cebu
- Celedonio "Celsi" Sitoy, former mayor of Cordova, Cebu
- Romeo P. Tionko, mayor of Damulog, Bukidnon
- Rey Uy, former mayor of Tagum
- Ignacio Zubiri, mayor of Malaybalay, Bukidnon

Other politicians

- Martin Diño, former Volunteers Against Crime and Corruption chair and PDP–Laban standard bearer
- Arleigh Sitoy, 6th district board member of the Province of Cebu

Religious leaders

- Eduardo V. Manalo, Iglesia ni Cristo executive minister
- Eddie Villanueva, Jesus is Lord Church
- Bo Sanchez, Light of Jesus Family
- Apollo Quiboloy, executive pastor and founder of Kingdom of Jesus Christ, The Name Above Every Name

Celebrities

- Alden Richards, actor, model
- Aljur Abrenica, actor, model
- Ellen Adarna, actress, model
- Bayani Agbayani, actor, comedian, singer, TV host
- Freddie Aguilar, folk musician
- Basti Artadi, Wolfgang vocalist
- Julia Barretto, actress
- Marjorie Barretto, actress
- Jimmy Bondoc, singer
- Jay Contreras, Kamikazee vocalist
- Angelika Dela Cruz, actress and captain of Barangay Longos, Malabon
- Kat de Castro, TV host
- Rodjun Cruz, actor
- Ney Dimaculangan, 6cyclemind vocalist
- Liza Diño, actress
- Jay Durias, singer-songwriter, composer
- Vice Ganda, actor, comedian
- Bangs Garcia, actress
- Cheska Garcia, actress, model
- Richard Gomez, actor
- Erich Gonzales, actress, model
- Kristine Hermosa, actress
- Glenn Jacinto, Teeth vocalist
- Ramon Jacinto, musician, TV and radio host
- Mary Jean Lastimosa, Binibining Pilipinas 2014 winner and Miss Universe Philippines 2014
- Shaina Magdayao, actress
- Luke Mejares, singer-songwriter
- Aiko Melendez, actress
- Chito Miranda, band vocalist, Parokya ni Edgar
- Mocha Girls, singing and dancing group
- Cesar Montano, actor, film producer
- Moymoy Palaboy, comic duo
- Dennis Padilla, actor, radio host
- Robin Padilla, actor
- Rommel Padilla, actor
- Angelica Panganiban, actress, comedian
- Richard Poon, singer-songwriter
- Camille Prats, actress
- Keanna Reeves, actress
- Franco Reyes, Franco vocalist
- Maine Mendoza, actress, TV host
- Maricar Reyes, actress
- Melissa Ricks, actress
- Mariel Rodriguez, actress, TV host
- Reg Rubio, Greyhoundz vocalist
- Monica Sacay, singer
- Aiza Seguerra, singer, actress
- Shehyee, rapper
- Pepe Smith, singer-songwriter
- Oyo Boy Sotto, actor
- Thor, singer-songwriter
- Eula Valdez, actress
- Jomari Yllana, actor

Athletes and sports figures

- Japeth Aguilar, basketball player
- Junjun Cabatu, basketball player
- Jeffrei Chan, basketball player
- Nonito Donaire, boxer
- Kenneth Duremdes, retired basketball player
- Ramon Fernandez, retired basketball player
- Dondon Hontiveros, basketball player
- Doug Kramer, basketball player
- Aby Maraño, volleyball player
- Alvin Patrimonio, retired basketball player
- Marc Pingris, basketball player
- Jay-R Reyes, basketball player
- Arwind Santos, basketball player
- Sonny Thoss, basketball player

Others

- Angelo Acosta, video game developer and entrepreneur
- Vitalliano Aguirre, businessman
- Emeterio Barcelon, former Ateneo de Davao University president
- Hermogenes Esperon Jr., former Armed Forces of the Philippines chief
- Antonio Floirendo, businessman
- Benigno Gopez, businessman
- Federico Moreno, son of late talent manager German Moreno
- Atty. Geraldine Tiu, host of Gikan sa Masa, Para sa Masa
- Arthur Tugade, former president of Clark Development Corporation

Organizations

- 1-Pacman Party List
- Anonymous Patriots for Peaceful and Progressive Philippines, or AP4
- Art Association of Bacolod
- Centrist Democratic Party of the Philippines
- Iglesia ni Cristo
- Kusog Agusanon, group of incumbent mayors of Agusan del Sur
- Laban ng Demokratikong Pilipino
- Bangon Pilipinas
- Light of Jesus Family
- Jesus is Lord Church
- Musicians and Artists for Duterte
- One Cebu Party
- Partido Abe Kapampangan
- Pwersa ng Bayaning Atleta
- Bukidnon Paglaum Party
- Moro National Liberation Front
Alan Peter Cayetano

Current and former Philippine senators

- Cynthia Villar, Philippine senator

Family members

- Lani Cayetano, wife and current mayor of Taguig City
- Ren-Ren Cayetano, brother and former councillor of Muntinlupa
- Lino Edgardo Cayetano, brother and current Philippine Representative of Taguig City

Religious leaders

- Apollo Quiboloy, executive pastor and founder of Kingdom of Jesus Christ, The Name Above Every Name

Celebrities

- Isay Alvarez-Seña, theater and TV actress
- Bianca Gonzales-Intal, TV host
- Shaina Magdayao, actress
- Robert Seña, theater and TV actor

Athletes and sports figures

- JC Intal, basketball player
- LA Tenorio, basketball player
- Fille Cainglet-Cayetano, sister-in-law and volleyball player

== Senate slate ==
PDP–Laban announced on February 15, 2016, that the Duterte-Cayetano tandem would not have a Senatorial slate so that the party could concentrate on promoting the tandem to gain "portability." Previously, Senatorial candidates were free to claim that they were part of the tandem's senatorial slate and have appeared in the duo's campaign rallies. Senatorial candidates may still make an appearance in the campaign rallies of Duterte and Cayetano to speak depending on availability but PDP–Laban clarified that there won't be any endorsement to any person running for Senator.

== See also ==
- Presidential transition of Rodrigo Duterte
