= Albert del Rosario =

Filipino diplomat (1939–2023)

The Honorable Albert del Rosario
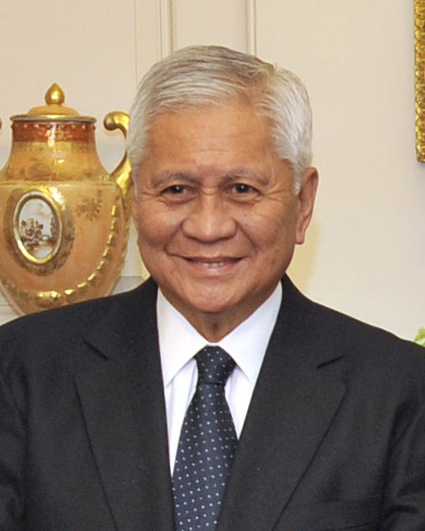
- del Rosario in 2012

25th Secretary of Foreign Affairs
- In office February 23, 2011 – March 7, 2016
- President: Benigno Aquino III
- Preceded by: Alberto Romulo
- Succeeded by: Jose Rene Almendras (acting)

Ambassador of the Philippines to the United States
- In office 2001–2006
- President: Gloria Macapagal Arroyo
- Preceded by: Ernesto Maceda
- Succeeded by: Willy C. Gaa

Personal details
- Born: Albert Ferreros del Rosario; November 14, 1939 Manila, Commonwealth of the Philippines
- Died: April 18, 2023 (aged 83) on flight to San Francisco, California, US
- Spouse: Gretchen de Venecia
- Relations: Monsour del Rosario (nephew); Gregorio del Pilar (first-cousin-twice-removed)
- Children: 4
- Education: New York University (BEc)
- Occupation: Business executive

Albert Ferreros del Rosario Sr. (November 14, 1939 – April 18, 2023) was a Filipino businessman, diplomat, and government official. He served as the secretary of foreign affairs of the Philippines from 2011 to 2016 under the Benigno Aquino III administration. During his tenure as foreign secretary, he was notable for representing the Philippines in a case against China's claim of the South China Sea under the United Nations Convention on the Law of the Sea.

Prior to serving foreign affairs secretary, he was chair of the Philippine Stratbase Consultancy and the Makati Foundation for Education and served as the ambassador of the Philippines to the United States from 2001 to 2006 during the Gloria Macapagal Arroyo administration.

== Early life ==
Albert Ferreros del Rosario was born in Manila on November 14, 1939, to Luis del Rosario and Amparo Ferreros. His great-grandmother Teresa Sempio was a sister of Felipa Sempio, the mother of Gregorio del Pilar. His grandfather, Judge Simplicio Sempio del Rosario, was a delegate to the Malolos Congress.

Del Rosario graduated from Xavier High School in New York and subsequently attended college at New York University, graduating with a degree in Economics. In 2006, he was inducted into the Xavier High School Hall of Fame.

Del Rosario was the uncle of actor, martial artist, and former Makati congressman Monsour del Rosario.

== Political career ==
During Corazon Aquino's presidential term, del Rosario would accompany her on state visits to the United States.

Before entering politics, del Rosario was on the board of several companies. He was chair of the Philippine Stratbase Consultancy and the Makati Foundation for Education. He was also president of Gotuaco, Del Rosario Insurance Brokers, and Philippine Telecommunications Investment Corp.

Before being appointed by Benigno Aquino III to the secretary of foreign affairs post, del Rosario was the Philippine ambassador to the United States under then-President Gloria Macapagal Arroyo from 2001 to 2006. He stepped down to return to the private sector. In 2008, he wrote that he could not defend the emergency rule to Washington since it was "unjustifiable".

=== Secretary of Foreign Affairs ===
On February 24, 2011, President Benigno Aquino III swore in del Rosario as his secretary of foreign affairs replacing Alberto Romulo.

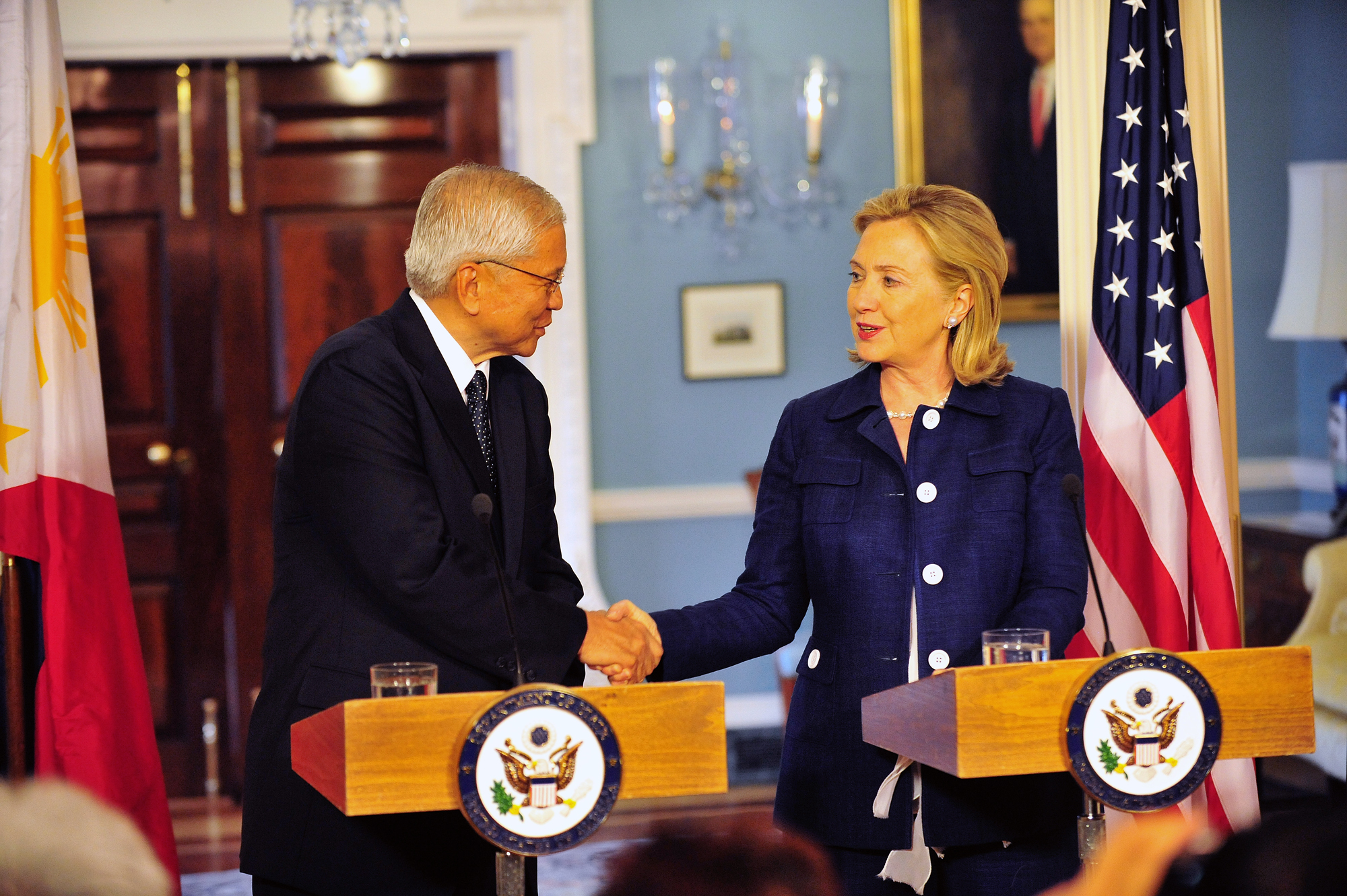
del Rosario with US Secretary of State Hillary Clinton

In May 2012, del Rosario called on the United States to supply the Philippines with "naval patrol vessels, aircraft, advanced radar systems and coastal surveillance facilities" in order to maintain his nation's sovereignty against Chinese claims in the South China Sea.

On March 30, 2014, the Philippines submitted its country's memorial to the Arbitral Tribunal in the Hague hearing the case it brought against the People's Republic of China under the United Nations Convention on the Law of the Sea. The memorial sought to have China's claim of 90% of the South China Sea, including several features within the Philippine Exclusive Economic Zone, declared invalid. The case was the first time international legal experts formally considered the validity of China's territorial claims in the South China Sea. On July 7, 2015, del Rosario appeared before the Arbitral Tribunal in the Hague to present "Why the Philippines brought this case to Arbitration and its importance to the region and the world".

On February 8, 2016, del Rosario announced that he would resign as secretary of foreign affairs, citing health reasons, which was later to be revealed he had a spinal condition. He stepped down on March 7, 2016, nearly four months before the end of President Aquino's term.

== Honors ==
In 1991, President Corazon Aquino conferred the Philippine Army Award to del Rosario for his initiatives as chair of the Makati Foundation for Education.

On September 15, 2014, del Rosario was awarded the Tanging Dangal Award (Gawad Dangal na Lipi), the highest recognition given to a Bulakenyo who demonstrates outstanding contributions to society.

On September 24, 2015, he was conferred an honorary Doctor of Laws degree (Honoris Causa) from New York's College of Mount Saint Vincent for his commitment to democracy, advocacy to the poor, opposing corruption and promoting peaceful change in the Philippines.

== Death ==
Prior to del Rosario's resignation, he had suffered from an undisclosed spinal medical condition. In 2015, he had undergone spinal surgery in the United States to treat it, but the procedure was unsuccessful.

Del Rosario died on April 18, 2023, from a heart attack while on board a commercial flight en route to San Francisco for a private pilgrimage. He was 83. A coroner in San Mateo concluded that del Rosario had died from heart failure and cardiomyopathy. His remains were returned to Manila on April 22.

Political offices
Preceded by Alberto Romulo	Secretary of Foreign Affairs; 2011–2016	Succeeded by Jose Rene Almendras; Acting
