= Legislative–Executive Development Advisory Council =

Advisory council to the president of the Philippines

Agency overview
- Formed: December 9, 1992; 33 years ago
- Type: Consultative and advisory body
- Headquarters: Malacañan Palace
- Motto: "Working together for the people"
- Agency executive: Chairperson, Bongbong Marcos, President of the Philippines
- Website: ledac.depdev.gov.ph

The Legislative–Executive Development Advisory Council (LEDAC) is a consultative and advisory body to the president of the Philippines, who serves as its chairperson. Established in 1992 through Republic Act No. 7640, the council assists the president in formulating programs and policies that are integral to achieving the country's socioeconomic development goals.

== Composition ==
Under the revised Implementing Rules and Regulations of Republic Act No. 7640, the council is composed of 20 members, with the president serving as chairperson. Its members are:

- the vice president;
- the president of the Senate;
- the speaker of the House of Representatives;
- seven Cabinet members designated by the president;
- three senators designated by the president of the Senate, at least one of whom shall come from the dominant minority party;
- three members of the House of Representatives designated by the speaker of the House of Representatives, at least one of whom shall come from the dominant minority party;
- one representative of the local government units;
- one representative of the youth; and
- one representative of the private sector from any or a combination of the following sectors: business, cooperatives, agriculture, and labor.

== Functions ==
The council performs the following functions:

- determine and recommend socio-economic development goals and policies which shall guide the formulation and implementation of the National Development Plan (NDP);
- provide policy advice to the President on vital issues affecting socio-economic development of the country;
- direct the study of measures to ensure that the RDP and programs are integrated into the NDP;
- receive, and in appropriate cases, require reports on and study measures to improve the implementation of ODA from multilateral and bilateral entities;
- assess effectiveness of implementation of the NDP;
- recommend the integration of environmental concepts, principles, and practices into the NDP for a balanced and cohesive approach to national development;
- review the relationship of the legislative agenda to the NDP to ensure the integration of both; and
- study and recommend to the President and to Congress sources of revenue as well as measures to reduce unnecessary expenditures to the end that the resources of the government will be used to the optimum.

== Current membership ==
Position	Member	Capacity	Party
Chairperson	Bongbong Marcos	President of the Philippines	PFP
Members from the Executive Branch	Sara Duterte	Vice President of the Philippines	HNP
Members from the Executive Branch	Arsenio Balisacan	Secretary of Economy, Planning, and Development	Nonpartisan
Members from the Executive Branch	Francisco Tiu Laurel Jr.	Secretary of Agriculture	Nonpartisan
Members from the Executive Branch	Sonny Angara	Secretary of Education	Nonpartisan
Members from the Executive Branch	Ted Herbosa	Secretary of Health	Nonpartisan
Members from the Executive Branch	Rex Gatchalian	Secretary of Social Welfare and Development	Nonpartisan
Members from the Legislative Branch	Sherwin Gatchalian	President of the Senate of the Philippines	NPC
Members from the Legislative Branch	JV Ejercito	Chairperson of the Senate Committee on Finance	NPC
Members from the Legislative Branch	Juan Miguel Zubiri	Senate Majority Leader	Independent
Members from the Legislative Branch	Alan Peter Cayetano	Senate Minority Leader	Independent
Members from the Legislative Branch	Bojie Dy	Speaker of the House of Representatives of the Philippines	PFP
Members from the Legislative Branch	Mika Suansing	Chairperson of the House Committee on Appropriations	PFP
Members from the Legislative Branch	Sandro Marcos	House Majority Leader	PFP
Members from the Legislative Branch	Marcelino Libanan	House Minority Leader	4Ps
Alternate Members from the Legislative Branch	Tito Sotto	President pro tempore of the Senate of the Philippines	NPC
Alternate Members from the Legislative Branch	Kiko Pangilinan	Senator of the Philippines	Liberal
Alternate Members from the Legislative Branch	Joel Villanueva	Senator of the Philippines	Independent
Alternate Members from the Legislative Branch	Albert Garcia	Senior Vice Chairperson of the House Committee on Appropriations	NUP
Alternate Members from the Legislative Branch	Miro Quimbo	Chairperson of the House Committee on Ways and Means	PFP
Sector Representatives	Dakila Cua	Local Government Unit Representative (Governor of Quirino)	PFP
Sector Representatives	Rene Almendras	Private Sector Representative	Nonpartisan

== See also ==
- Department of Economy, Planning, and Development
