= Rene Almendras =

Filipino businessman and public servant

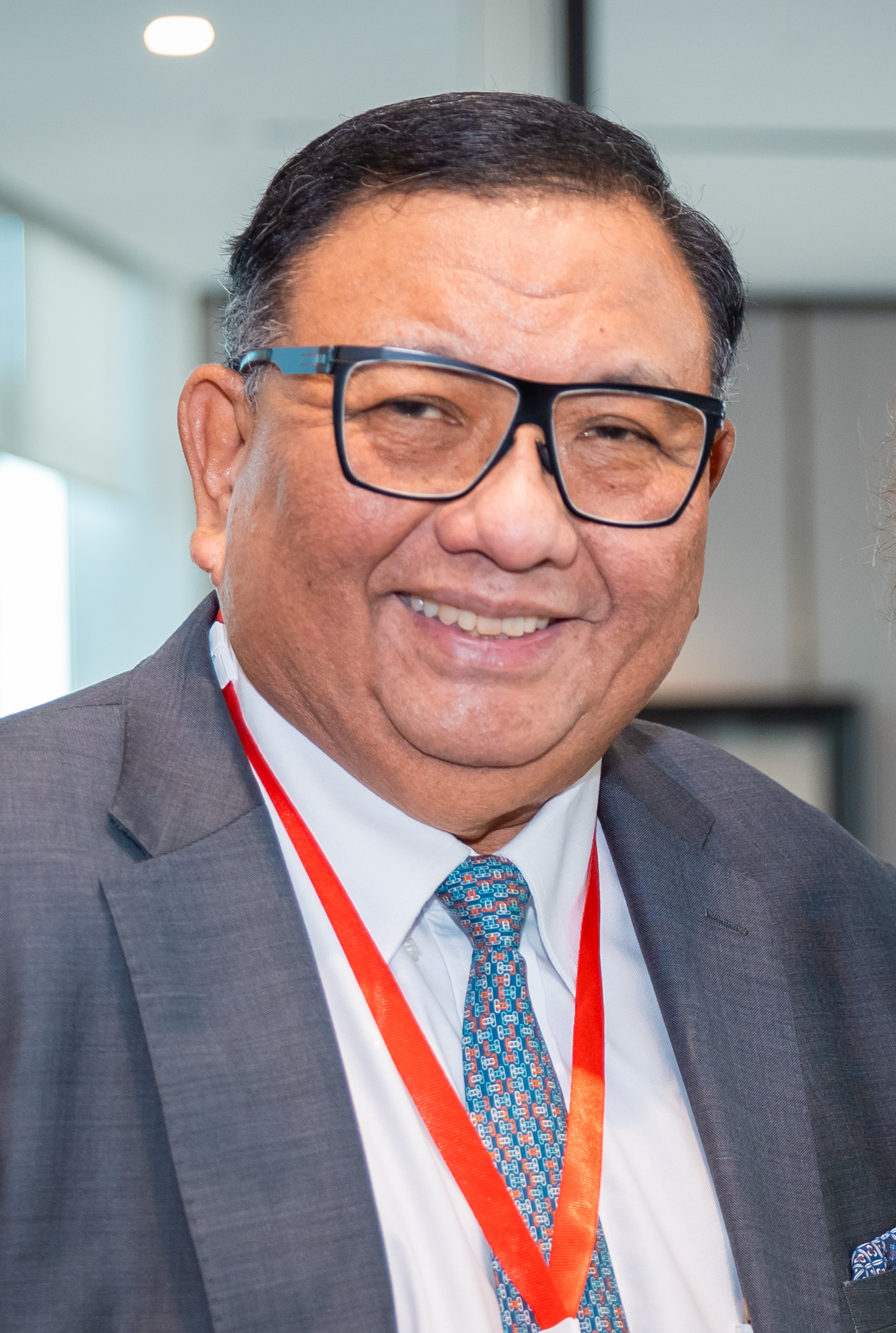
- Almendras in 2024

Representative to the Legislative-Executive Development Advisory Council
- Incumbent
- Assumed office May 22, 2025
- President: Bongbong Marcos

Secretary of Foreign Affairs
- Acting
- In office March 8, 2016 – June 30, 2016
- President: Benigno Aquino III
- Preceded by: Albert del Rosario
- Succeeded by: Perfecto Yasay Jr. (Ad interim)

Cabinet Secretary of the Philippines
- In office November 5, 2012 – March 8, 2016
- President: Benigno Aquino III
- Preceded by: Silvestre H. Bello III
- Succeeded by: Leoncio Evasco Jr.

Secretary of Energy
- In office June 30, 2010 – November 4, 2012
- President: Benigno Aquino III
- Preceded by: Jose Ibazeta (Acting)
- Succeeded by: Carlos Jericho L. Petilla

Personal details
- Born: Jose Rene Dimataga Almendras; March 12, 1960 (age 66) Cebu City, Philippines
- Relations: Agnes Magpale (sister)
- Education: Ateneo de Manila University
- Occupation: Government official

Jose Rene Dimataga Almendras (born March 12, 1960, Cebu City) is a Filipino businessman and public servant. He served as Secretary of the Department of Foreign Affairs in an acting capacity under the administration of President Benigno Aquino III. Prior to his appointment, Almendras held the position of Cabinet Secretary and Secretary of the Department of Energy.

== Background ==
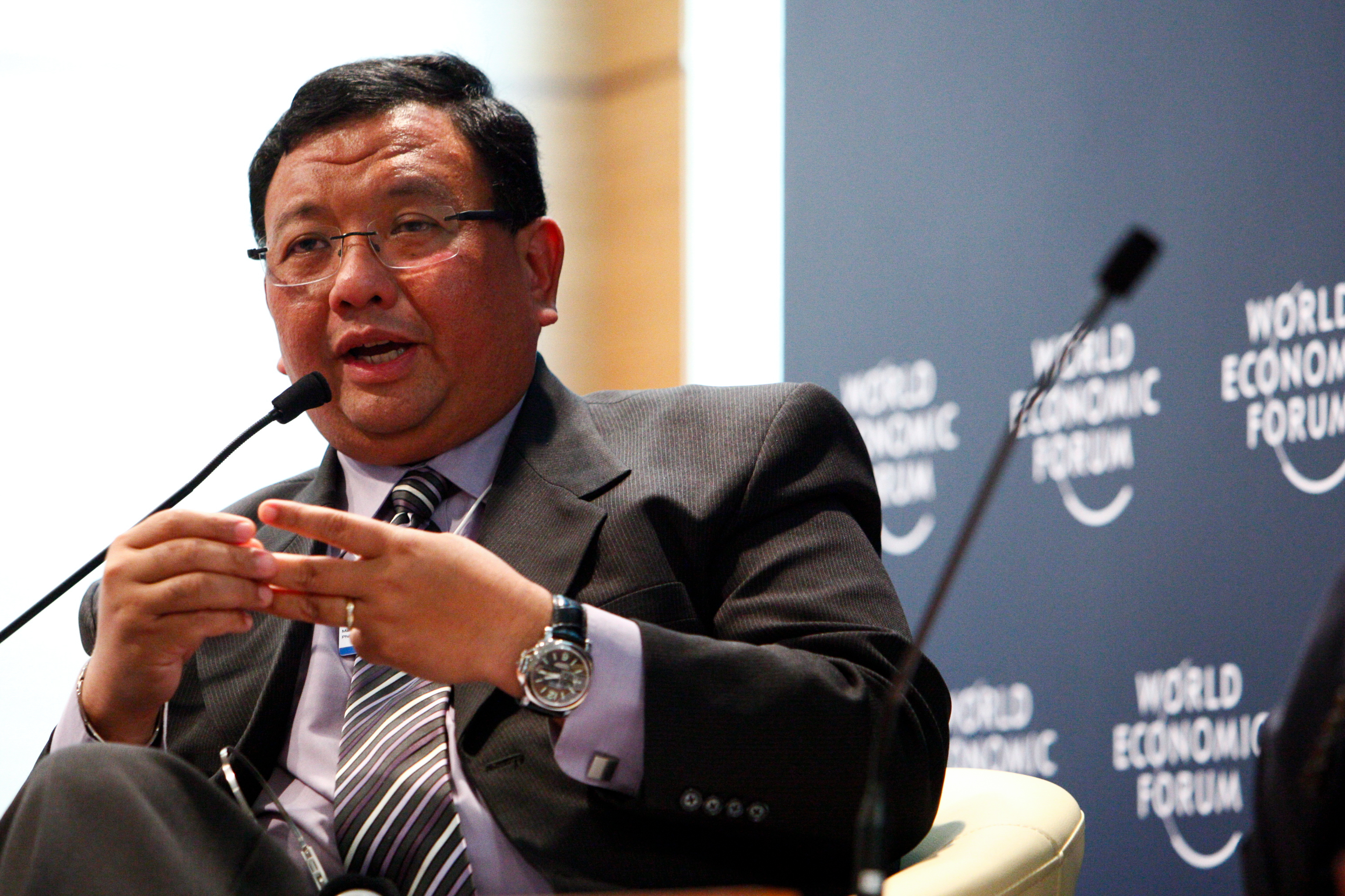
Almendras at the World Economic Forum on East Asia in 2010

Almendras was born in Cebu City to Josefino Almendras and Rosita Dimataga. Before and after being appointed by Benigno Aquino III as Energy secretary, Almendras became the president of Manila Water of the Ayala Corporation group. Prior to Ayala, he was treasurer of Aboitiz & Co. and Aboitiz Equity Ventures.

== Views on energy and energy policy ==
For many years, the Philippines took a short-term approach to addressing its power needs. However, in an interview with the Voices of the Philippines, Almendras said that "energy is never short-term" and implemented the Energy Reform Agenda, a 25-year programme, with energy access the most important theme. ‘Energy access’ is defined as both availability and affordability. He said that he believes in long-term planning and that "knee-jerk reactions can wreak havoc with structures which need to have a long-term focus." He said that the energy reform agenda was necessary because we (the Philippines) cannot afford band-aid solutions, it is important that every action we take today has a long-term strategic view."

His focus is on creating an even playing field, public-private partnerships and an acknowledgement that energy is everyone’s concern. This is based on three key pillars: energy security, optimal energy pricing and sustainable energy planning.

Almendras has launched the Philippine Energy Contracting Round 4, as well as coal exploration contracts.

== Views and policies on renewable energy ==
The Philippines has a full renewable-energy potential that is estimated at 247,000-MW, based on the United States Department of Energy National Renewable Energy Laboratory estimates. To achieve this goal, on December 2, 2010, Almendras said the Department of Energy draft for the Renewable Portfolio Standards (RPS) will be completed by the second quarter of 2011, and the National Renewable Energy Board (NREB) will submit its proposed Feed-in Tariff Rates also in the second quarter as well as the green-energy option program--all of which affect renewable energy development into the country. Almendras endeavored to achieve a total of 8,000-megawatts (MW) of generating capacity by 2030 and encouraged developers to put these renewable energy capacity up. But in the near term, he also asked them to work to set up, between 2015 and 2016, at least 2,000-3,000 MW of generating capacity in renewable energy.

He addresses the issue that electricity costs for residential use in the Philippines is among the highest in the region, but objects to offering subsidies to address this. He said that, "If you price your energy too low, you will encourage inefficiency. This is why, during the last APEC (Asia-Pacific Economic Cooperation) Conference, a resolution was passed which stated that there should be no more subsidizing of hydrocarbons or petroleum. After all, with subsidies the nation will not begin its transition to the reality-that hydrocarbons have peaked. We are now in depletion mode which means that prices will continue to go up."

He believes in enhancing the market structures by building better competition structures, with base load, mid-term and peaking plans. He is a proponent of optimal pricing strategy to encourage the construction of more base-load generating capacity, and encourages the development of our indigenous resources further. The Philippines, as the second-leading geothermal generating country in the world, second only to the United States, he said, should explore more geothermal opportunities. He aimed to develop 1,200 megawatts of hydropower over the next five to seven years. On the renewable side, the mini-hydros and the micro-hydro initiatives, and the bio-mass were also put in place.

Geothermal power makes up approximately 18% of the country's electricity generation and President Benigno Aquino III aimed for the Philippines to be the number one geothermal energy producer in the world, once the additional 1,475 MW capacity is achieved. On December 8, 2011, at the Investor Breakfast Meeting during World Geothermal Energy Summit organised by the Center for Energy Sustainability and Economics and Arc Media Global, Almendras addressed investor concerns on streamlining the permit process by government regulators as shorter project periods would reduce uncertainty for policy and market dynamics when modeling economic returns and more importantly the implementation of feed-in-tariffs (“FiT”) rates and guidelines for renewable portfolio standards for renewable energy (“RE”).,

Almendras supports a free market model. He said that, "The Philippines is one of the few countries where energy is played out on a free market. These spot markets increase choice when it comes to the purchasing of energy, and the aim of this is to encourage a more dynamic market, and achieve a more sustainable pricing mechanism."

== Representative at LEDAC ==
Former Cabinet Secretary Jose Rene Almendras returned to government service as the private sector representative to the Legislative-Executive Development Advisory Council (LEDAC). He took his oath of office before President Bongbong Marcos at Malacañang Palace on May 22, 2025.

== Personal life ==
He is the younger brother of Agnes Almendras-Magpale, former Vice Governor of Cebu, who briefly served as Acting Governor in December 2012 following the suspension of Governor Gwendolyn Garcia.

== Honours ==
- Order of the Rising Sun, 2nd Class, Gold and Silver Star (2026)

Political offices
| Preceded by Albert del Rosario | Secretary of Foreign Affairs; Acting; 2016 | Succeeded by Perfecto Yasay, Jr. Ad interim |
| Preceded by Silvestre Bello III | Cabinet Secretary of the Philippines; 2012 – 2016 | Succeeded by Leoncio Evasco Jr. |
| Preceded by Jose Ibazeta; Acting | Secretary of Energy; 2010 – 2012 | Succeeded by Jericho Petilla |
