= Martin Diño =

Filipino politician (1957–2023)

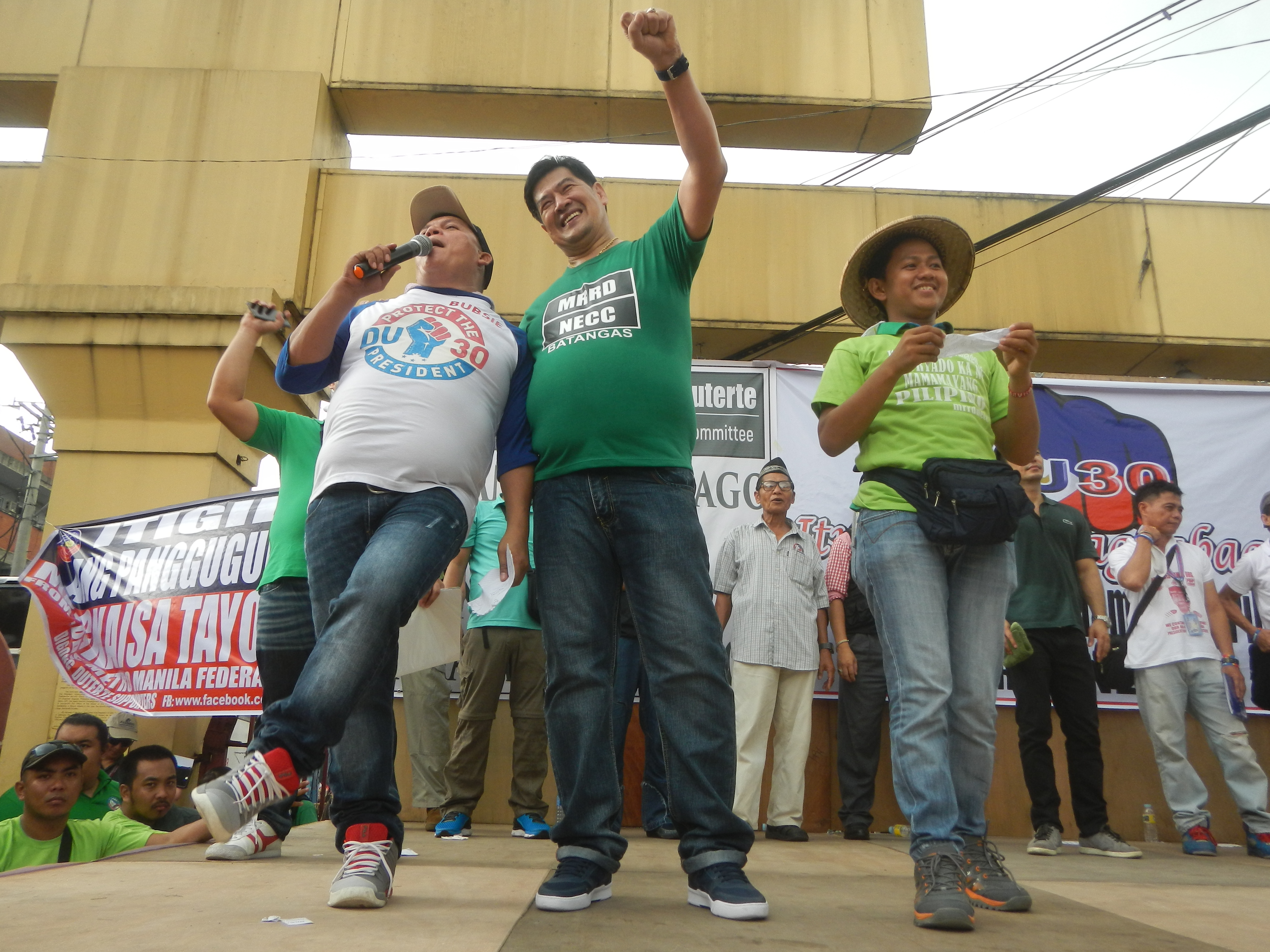
- Diño (center) in 2017

Chairman and Administrator of the Subic Bay Metropolitan Authority
- In office 2016–2017
- President: Rodrigo Duterte
- Preceded by: Roberto Garcia
- Succeeded by: Wilma Eisma

Personal details
- Born: Martin Badulis Diño; July 25, 1957 Quezon City, Philippines
- Died: August 8, 2023 (aged 66)
- Party: PDP–Laban
- Children: including Liza

Martin "Bobot" Badulis Diño (July 25, 1957 – August 8, 2023) was a Filipino activist, politician, government official and presidential candidate whose withdrawal from the 2016 Philippine presidential election paved the way for his substitution by Rodrigo Duterte, who went on to win the Philippine presidency.

== Early life ==
Diño first rose to prominence as the barangay captain of San Antonio, Quezon City for 13 years, during which he became a vocal advocate for the stepdaughter of Leo Echegaray, who was executed for raping her, in 1999. He subsequently became president of the anti-crime group Volunteers Against Crime and Corruption. In 1982, he joined the political party PDP–Laban.

== 2016 presidential elections ==
On the final day of the filing of candidacies for the 2016 Philippine presidential election on 26 October 2015, PDP–Laban nominated Diño, its deputy secretary-general, as its candidate for president. His candidacy was seen as a last-ditch effort to push for the candidacy of then-Davao City mayor Rodrigo Duterte, who had hitherto refused to run for president, citing rules set by the Commission on Elections (COMELEC) that allowed for substitutions until December 10. Diño denied the accusations, saying that he had planned to run for president for a long time.

However, serious discrepancies were discovered on Diño's certificate of candidacy, wherein it was found that he had filed a candidacy to run for mayor of Pasay rather than President, even though he was a resident of Quezon City. Before the COMELEC could rule on petitions to have him disqualified as a nuisance candidate on those grounds, Diño withdrew his candidacy on 29 October, saying he felt insulted by the COMELEC legal department's assertion that he did not have enough funds to run a nationwide campaign, and named Duterte as his substitute. He later called the errors on his certificate an "honest mistake".

As a result of Diño's withdrawal, PDP-Laban subsequently nominated Duterte as its substitute presidential candidate, which was finalized after Duterte withdrew his bid for Mayor of Davao City and filed his certificate of candidacy for president. Duterte went on to win in the elections held in May 2016 and was sworn in the following month.

== Role in the Duterte administration ==
After assuming the presidency, Duterte appointed Diño to become Chair of the Subic Bay Metropolitan Authority on 23 September 2016. After two years, Diño was then transferred to the Department of the Interior and Local Government as its Undersecretary for Barangay Affairs. He served until Duterte left office in 2022.

== Controversy ==
On March 2018, photos of Diño wearing the uniform of a Rear Admiral of the Philippine Coast Guard Auxiliary circulated online. The Philippine Coast Guard discloed that Diño was not a member of the PCGA, and was not authorized to wear the uniform of a PCGA Rear Admiral. Diño explained that he was recruited by the PCGA at the Manila Yacht Club, to which the PCG responded that Diño may have been recruited by a bogus organization. The DILG distanced itself from the issue at that time.

In January 2023, the Philippine Coast Guard filed a case at the Securities and Exchange Commission in the misrepresentation done by a group called 101st Balangay PCG Auxiliary, Inc., which was charging ₱20,000.00 for membership, and promising monthly allowance of ₱30,000.00. Diño was named as one of its incorporators. A case of estafa was also filed in Bataan against Diño and fellow incorporators of 101st Balangay PCG Auxiliary. The PCG has disavowed the 101st Balangay PCG Auxiliary, and has denied it has given any authorization to the said group.

== Personal life and death ==
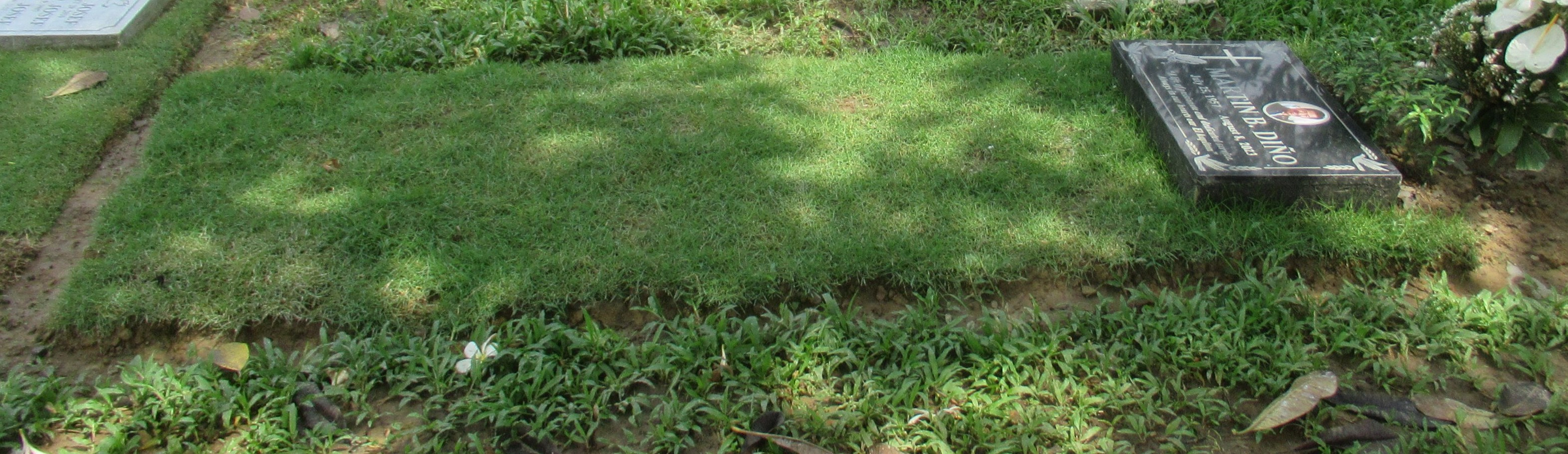
Diño's gravesite at the (Loyola Memorial Park)

Diño was the father of actress and beauty queen Liza Diño, who was also appointed by Duterte as chair of the Film Development Council of the Philippines. He was also the father-in-law of singer and former child star Ice Seguerra, whom Liza married in the United States in 2014 and was also appointed by Duterte as chair of the National Youth Commission.

In July 2023, Liza disclosed that her father had been suffering from stage IV lung cancer for more than a year. On 8 August, he died from acute respiratory failure caused by his illness. He was 66.
