= Leoncio Evasco Jr. =

Filipino politician

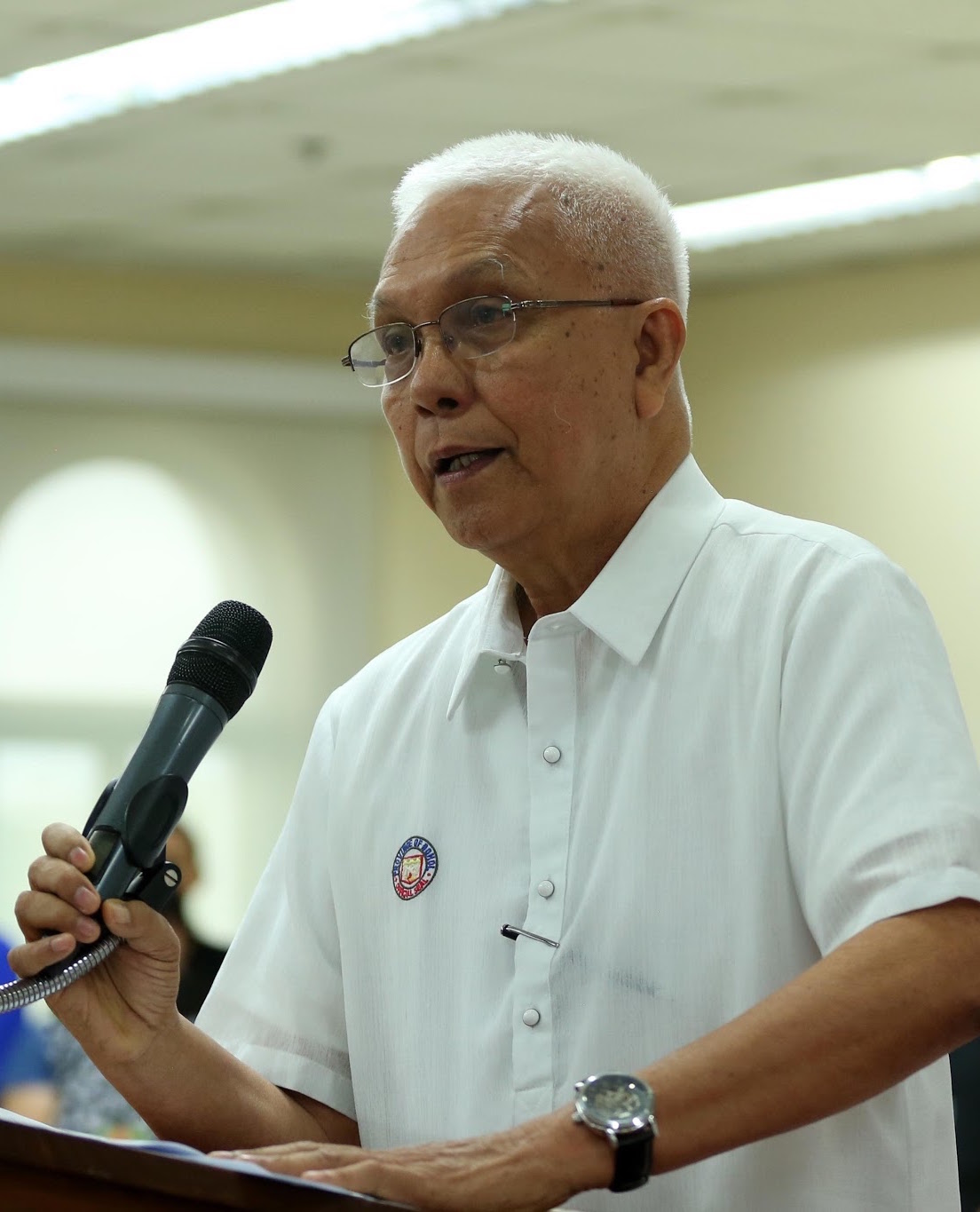
- Evasco in 2016, addressing employees of the Malacañang Palace

Presidential Adviser on Streamlining of Government Processes
- In office November 24, 2020 – June 30, 2022
- President: Rodrigo Duterte
- Preceded by: Position created

Cabinet Secretary of the Philippines
- In office June 30, 2016 – October 16, 2018
- President: Rodrigo Duterte
- Preceded by: Jose Rene Almendras
- Succeeded by: Karlo Nograles

6th Chairman of the Housing and Urban Development Coordinating Council
- In office December 5, 2016 – July 12, 2017
- President: Rodrigo Duterte
- Preceded by: Leni Robredo
- Succeeded by: Eduardo del Rosario

Mayor of Maribojoc
- In office June 30, 2007 – June 30, 2016
- Preceded by: Gabino Redulla
- Succeeded by: Mer Arocha

Personal details
- Born: Leoncio Badilla Evasco Jr. March 29, 1944 (age 82) Maribojoc, Bohol, Philippines
- Party: PRP (2021–present); HTL (local party)
- Other political affiliations: CPP (1974–1980s); Independent (1980s–2007); NPC (2007–2021)
- Education: Major Seminary of San Carlos; Ateneo de Davao University
- Occupation: Businessman

Leoncio "Jun" Badilla Evasco Jr. (born March 29, 1944) is a Filipino politician who served as Secretary of the Cabinet from 2016 to 2018 and was the Presidential Adviser on Streamlining of Government Processes under the Duterte administration from 2020 to 2022. Before he was appointed as the Cabinet secretary, he was the Mayor of Maribojoc town in Bohol from 2007 to 2016. He was an ordained priest, being ordained in 1970, when he joined the Communist Party of the Philippines and its armed wing, the New People's Army, in 1974.

== Early life and education ==
Evasco was born in Maribojoc in Bohol province on March 29, 1944. He finished his AB degree in Philosophy and Theology in Seminario Mayor de San Carlos in Cebu City in 1966 and 1970, respectively. He obtained a master's degree in Ateneo de Davao University.

== Career ==
Evasco was ordained a priest in 1970. He was assigned as priest in Dauis, Baclayon and Catigbian all in Bohol. A raid by soldiers in his convent in Catigbian in 1974 pushed him to join the underground Communist Party of the Philippines and its armed wing, the New People's Army. In 1983 he was caught while presiding over the wedding of a comrade in Midsayap, North Cotabato. He was tortured and four of his those arrested with him was summarily executed. Evasco was prosecuted by then prosecutor Rodrigo Duterte for rebellion. Following the EDSA People Power Revolution he was one of the political detainees ordered released from jail by then President Cory Aquino. After his release, Evasco worked as secretary general of Samahan ng Ex-Detainees Laban sa Detensyon at Aresto. He served as campaign manager of Duterte when he run in 1988 mayoral elections. He served as OIC of the city engineer's office from 1989 to 1990. Evasco headed the economic enterprise office before being appointed as chief of staff of Duterte. Evasco is among the "Davao Boys", a small circle of Duterte's closest and trusted associates.

=== Maribojoc Mayor ===
Evasco ran for mayor of Maribojoc in 2007 and won despite being away from the town for 3 decades. He won re-election in 2010 and 2013. Under his leadership Maribojoc received the Galing Pook award for 2011 for its Cadastral Survey and Simultaneous Systematic Adjudication Project. The town was also conferred the Seal of Good Housekeeping by the Department of the Interior and Local Government in 2010 and 2011. In the wake of the 2013 Bohol earthquake he was involved in a controversy with Philippine Red Cross volunteers regarding the distribution of relief goods to the victims. The controversy led to the prevention of Red Cross volunteers from entering Maribojoc.

Political offices
Preceded by Gabino Redulla	Mayor of Maribojoc; 2007–2016	Succeeded by Mer Arocha
Preceded by Leni Robredo	Chairman of Housing and Urban Development Coordinating Council; 2016–2017	Succeeded by Eduardo del Rosario
Preceded by Jose Rene Almendras	Cabinet Secretary of the Philippines; 2016–2018	Succeeded by Karlo Nograles
