= Liza Diño =

Filipino actress and government official

Mary Liza Diño
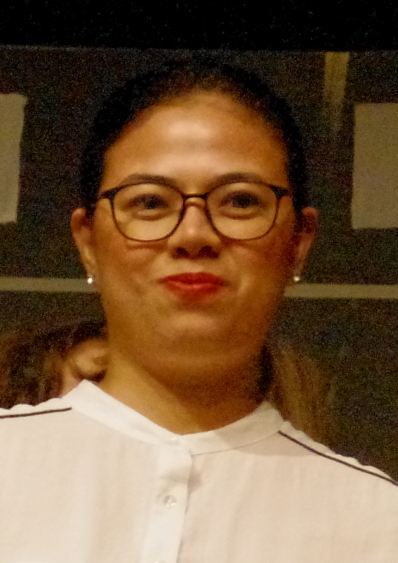
- Diño, 2018.

Chairperson of the Film Development Council of the Philippines
- In office August 12, 2016 – June 30, 2022
- President: Rodrigo Duterte
- Preceded by: Briccio G. Santos
- Succeeded by: Tirso Cruz III

Personal details
- Born: Mary Liza Bautista Diño; June 25, 1981 (age 45) Quezon City, Philippines
- Spouse: Ice Seguerra (m. 2014)
- Children: 1
- Parent: Martin Diño (father)

Mary Liza Diño (born June 25, 1981) is a government official, former beauty pageant winner and actress in the Philippines.

== Career ==
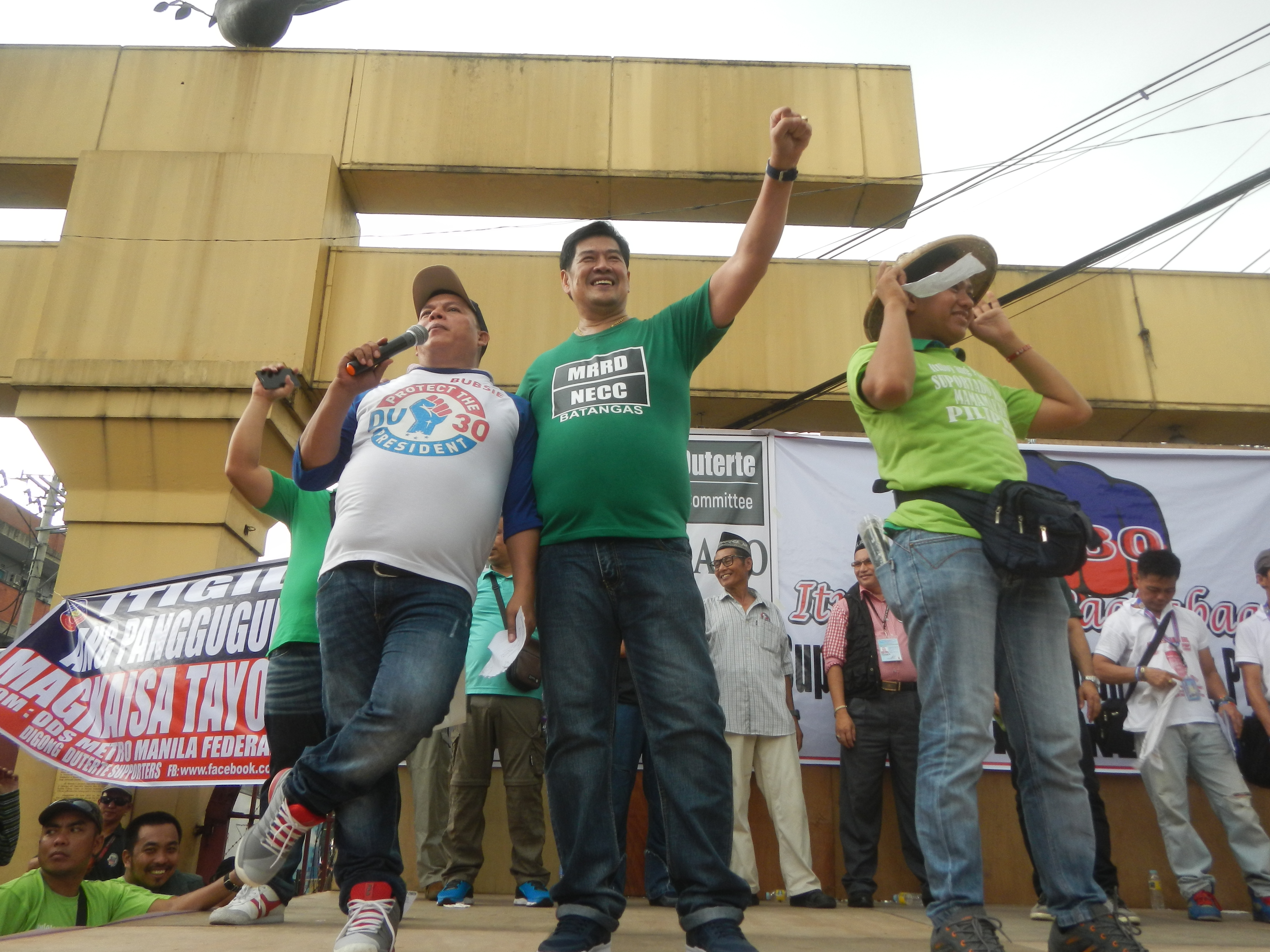
Liza's father Martin Diño in 2017

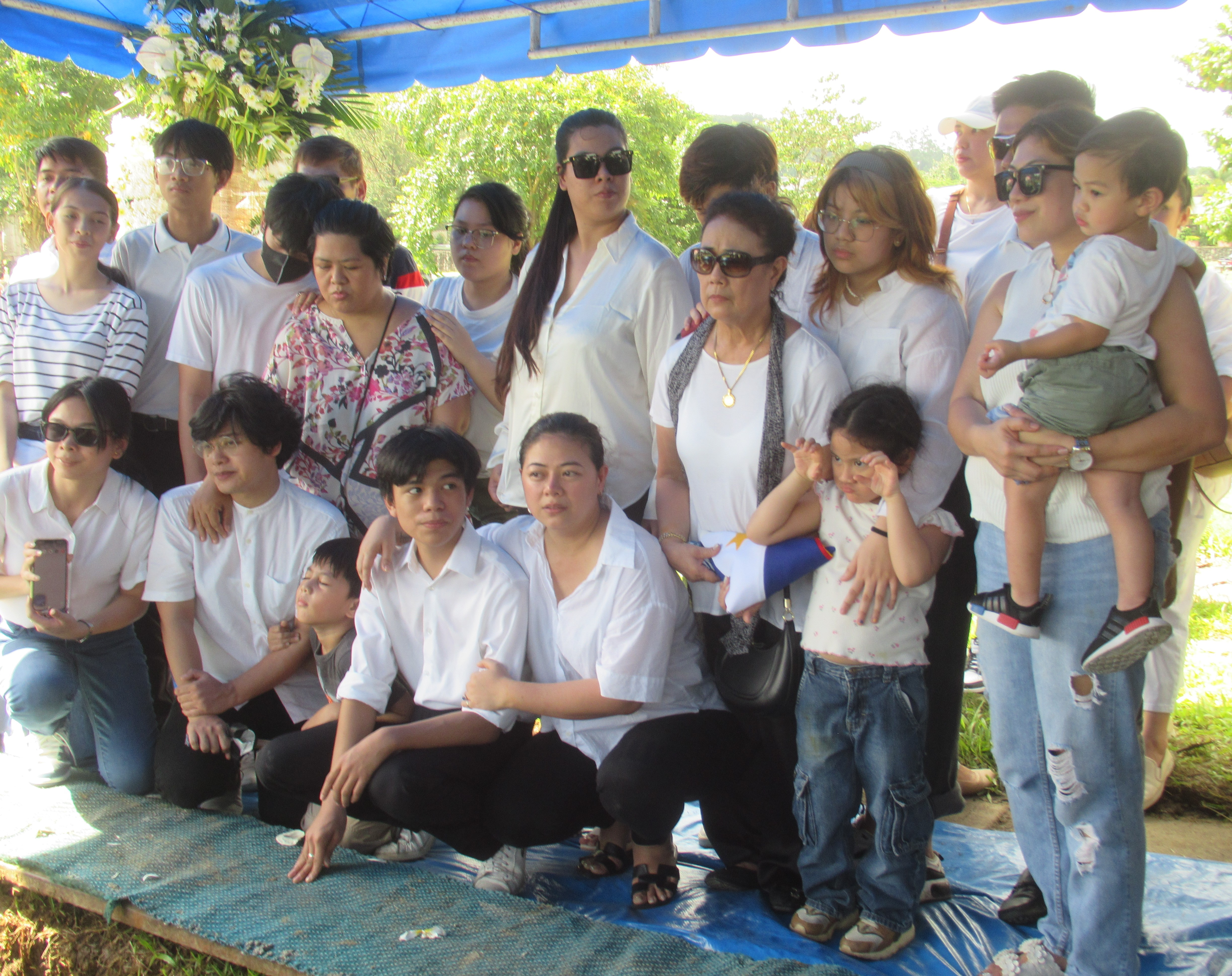
iza at Martin Diño's funeral

During her time as a student, she joined Mutya ng Pilipinas beauty pageant and won as Mutya ng Pilipinas-Tourism International. She then represented the Philippines in the Miss Tourism International pageant in 2001. She then joined GMA 7 artist center and appeared in Daddy Di Do Du, Pira-pirasong Pangarap, Habang Kapiling Ka, Atlantika, and Bakekang. Her first theater role was at Dulaang University of the Philippines (DUP), where she appeared onstage in The Passion of the Christ under Tony Mabesa, and in Divinas Palabras (2000) and Shakespeare's The Winter's Tale (2002), both under director Jose Estrella.

After graduating from the University of the Philippines with a BA in Speech and Communications, her first film role was in Two Timer (2002) under Regal Films where she appeared in Xerex (2003), under the direction of Mel Chionglo. Since then, she has appeared in a number of films including Pinay Pie (2002) and A Love Story (2007).

She played the lead in her first independent film Compound (2006/2010) directed by Will Fredo, which was nominated for best picture in the Golden Screen Awards and was shown in various international film festivals. She subsequently appeared in the independent films Baliw (2006) by Redd Ochoa which competed in the Montreal World Film Festival, Sinungaling na Buwan (2007) by Ed Lejano for Cinemalaya, Rome and Juliet (2007) under the direction of Connie Macatuno for Cinema One, and Sa Pagdapo ng Mariposa (2008) by Will Fredo. Her latest film project, a Flamenco dance movie directed by Will Fredo entitled In Nomine Matris, was released in 2012. She played the lead in the film alongside Biboy Ramirez and opera singer Al Gatmaitan. The movie also stars flamenco artist Clara Ramona and actor Tami Monsod.

In 2014, she played a cameo role in the television show The Legal Wife as Nicole's mother in flashbacks, and later became part of the cast of Mirabella as Aster.

Following a trip to Spain in 2005, she began to study flamenco dance. Under the tutelage of flamenco dancer Clara Ramona, Diño became a dancer of her company, performing with the group in Asia and the US.

In 2008, Diño moved to the US to start a family and pursue a culinary career. She completed a certificate program in Culinary Arts at Le Cordon Bleu of Culinary Arts and is presently working as a chef at Spago in Beverly Hills, owned by chef Wolfgang Puck. She continued her acting and cooking careers, appearing in short films and commercials in the US. She starred as the delusional Imelda Marcos in the short film Imelda and Gunter (2009) directed by Ramon Sanchez, which also did some festival rounds in the US and has shot commercials for KCAL insurance (2008) and 24/7 debit card (2011) with Manny Pacquiao. She has also worked as a host in various Filipino-American social events. At present, she is the spokesperson and director of Public Relations for Miss Philippines USA beauty pageant.

On August 12, 2016, Diño was appointed by President Rodrigo Duterte as Chairperson of the Film Development Council of the Philippines.

== Personal life ==
Diño is the daughter of DILG Undersecretary and former Barangay San Antonio, Quezon City Captain, Martin Diño. On December 8, 2014, she married singer and former child star Ice Seguerra in San Francisco, California.

On May 24, 2024, Diño sued the Philippine entertainment website PEP for cyberlibel over its publication of stories about her, accusing it of tarnishing her reputation by manipulating public opinion.

== Awards and nominations ==
- 2016 Nominee Best Supporting Actress Gawad Urian "Toto"
- 2016 honoree Ani Ng Dangal Award "In Nomine Matris" Best Actress in Global Category, Equality Int'l Film Festival, Oakland Ca
- 2015 honoree Philippine Daily Inquirer's INDIE BRAVO AWARDS "In Nomine Matris" (2012) best actress global category, Equality Int'l Film Festival
- 2015 Best Featured Actress in a Play Broadway World Awards Philippines "Noli Fili:Dekada Dos Mil" Peta Productions
- 2015 Won Ani Ng Dangal Award "In Nomine Matris" 2012
- 2014 honoree Philippine Daily Inquirer's INDIE BRAVO AWARDS "In Nomine Matris" (2012)
- 2014 Won Best Actress International Film Festival Manhattan New York In Nomine Matris (2012)
- 2014 Won Best Female Performance (Overall) Equality International Film Festival In Nomine Matris (2012)
- 2013 Nominated Best Actress Gawad Urian Award In Nomine Matris (2013)
- 2012 Won Best Actress New Wave Category Metro Manila Film Festival In Nomine Matris (2012)
- 2012 Won Ani Ng Dangal Award "Compound" 2010
- 2007 Won Lone Acting Achievement Award International Film Festival Manhattan New York Compound (2010)
