= Parish Pastoral Council for Responsible Voting =

Non-profit organization affiliated with the Catholic Church in the Philippines

Parish Pastoral Council on Responsible Voting
- Founded: October 19, 1991
- Founders: Cardinal Jaime Sin; Haydee Yorac; Henrietta T. de Villa; Gabriel Reyes; Bayani Valenzuela
- Type: Nonprofit and non-governmental organization
- Purpose: Elections, plebiscites and referendums
- Location: Pope Pius XII Center, United Nations Avenue, Ermita, Manila, Philippines
- Region served: Nationwide
- Services: Democracy reform in the Philippines
- Fields: Poll watching, advocacy, electoral reforms
- Key people: Myla Villanueva (Chairperson)
- Volunteers: 500,000+
- Website: http://www.ppcrv.org/

The Parish Pastoral Council for Responsible Voting (PPCRV) is a non-partisan, non-sectarian non-profit organization affiliated with the Catholic Church in the Philippines that works to ensure free, fair and fraud-free elections in the country. The organization has been the "citizens' arm" of the Commission on Elections (COMELEC) since 2010. PPCRV conducts the unofficial parallel count of returns after elections.

PPCRV's activities include advocating for electoral reforms, conducting parallel manual audits in automated elections, coordinating parishes to conduct poll-watching, providing legal assistance related to elections, reporting electoral violations, providing voter assistance services, and voter education.

== History ==
The Second Plenary Council of the Philippines, held in February 1991, called for reforms in the conduct of elections in the Philippines. In May 1991, Cardinal Jaime Sin, Archbishop of Manila; Commission on Elections Commissioner Haydee Yorac; then-Laity President Henrietta T. de Villa, Gabriel Reyes, Bayani Valenzuela, and thirty parish lay leaders conceived of the idea of the PPCRV in Mandaluyong. In October 1991, the PPCRV was launched at St. Paul University, Quezon City, with around one thousand laypeople from the parishes of the Archdiocese of Manila. The next month, with the support of the Catholic Bishops' Conference of the Philippines, the PPCRV expanded its operations nationwide.

PPCRV's poll-watching activities began with the 1992 presidential elections. Then, 346,688 PPCRV volunteers participated in poll-watching, voters’ assistance, assisting the Board of Election Inspectors, protecting election returns, monitoring electoral exercise, and watching the canvassing of votes.

== Relation with COMELEC ==
In April 2013, PPCRV was accused by the Archbishop of Lipa Ramon Arguelles of being a COMELEC lapdog since the conduct of the 2010 general elections, an allegation that the chairperson of PPCRV, Henrietta T. de Villa, disputes. The organization has been a "citizens arm" of the Commission of Elections since 2010.

In 2010, it had objected to the National Movement for Free Elections' (NAMFREL) application as a citizen's arm of COMELEC, stating that a dual system would interfere with election watch. NAMFREL had never objected to PPCRV's applications as a citizen arm in previous elections. The feud seems to be over as both parties were accredited by COMELEC for the 2013 midterm elections and agreed on their respective functions.
