= Datang =

Datang may refer to:

== Companies ==
The word Datang (meaning grand China; Tang as a reference to the Tang dynasty) was used in several companies

- China Datang Corporation: a state-owned enterprise mainly in power generation in the People's Republic of China
  - Datang International Power Generation Company: a state-owned enterprise in power generation, subsidiary of China Datang Corporation
- Datang Telecom Group: a telecommunication equipment vendor in the People's Republic of China
  - Datang Telecom Technology
- BYD Datang, an electric full-size crossover SUV by BYD Auto

== Places in China ==
Place with name Datang, which means big pond

- Datang station (disambiguation) (Chinese: 大塘)
- Datang Subdistrict, Guangzhou (Chinese: 大塘街道), in Yuexiu District, Guangzhou
- Datang Subdistrict, Wuzhou (Chinese: 大塘街道), a subdistrict in Changzhou District, Wuzhou, Guangxi
- Datang Town (disambiguation) (Chinese: 大塘镇)
- Datang, Sichuan (Chinese: 大塘铺), in Pujiang County, Chengdu, Sichuan
- Datang Township (Chinese: 大塘乡)
  - Datang Township, Guidong County, Guidong County, Hunan
  - Datang, Jiangxi, in Yugan County, Jiangxi
  - Datang, Zhuji, in Zhuji, Zhejiang, also known as "Sock City"

== See also ==
- Tang (disambiguation)
