= Datang Town =

Datang (大塘镇) could refer to the following towns in China:

- Datang, Foshan, in Sanshui District, Foshan, Guangdong
- Datang, Shaoguan, in Qujiang District, Shaoguan, Guangdong
- Datang, Lipu County, in Lipu County, Guangxi
- Datang, Nanning, in Liangqing District, Nanning, Guangxi
- Datang, Xincheng County, in Xincheng County, Guangxi
- Datang, Yulin, Guangxi, in Yuzhou District, Yulin, Guangxi
- Datang, Pingtang County, in Pingtang County, Guizhou
- Datang, Pujiang County, Sichuan
- Datang, Zhuji, in Zhuji, Zhejiang
