= Sock wrestling =

Contact sport

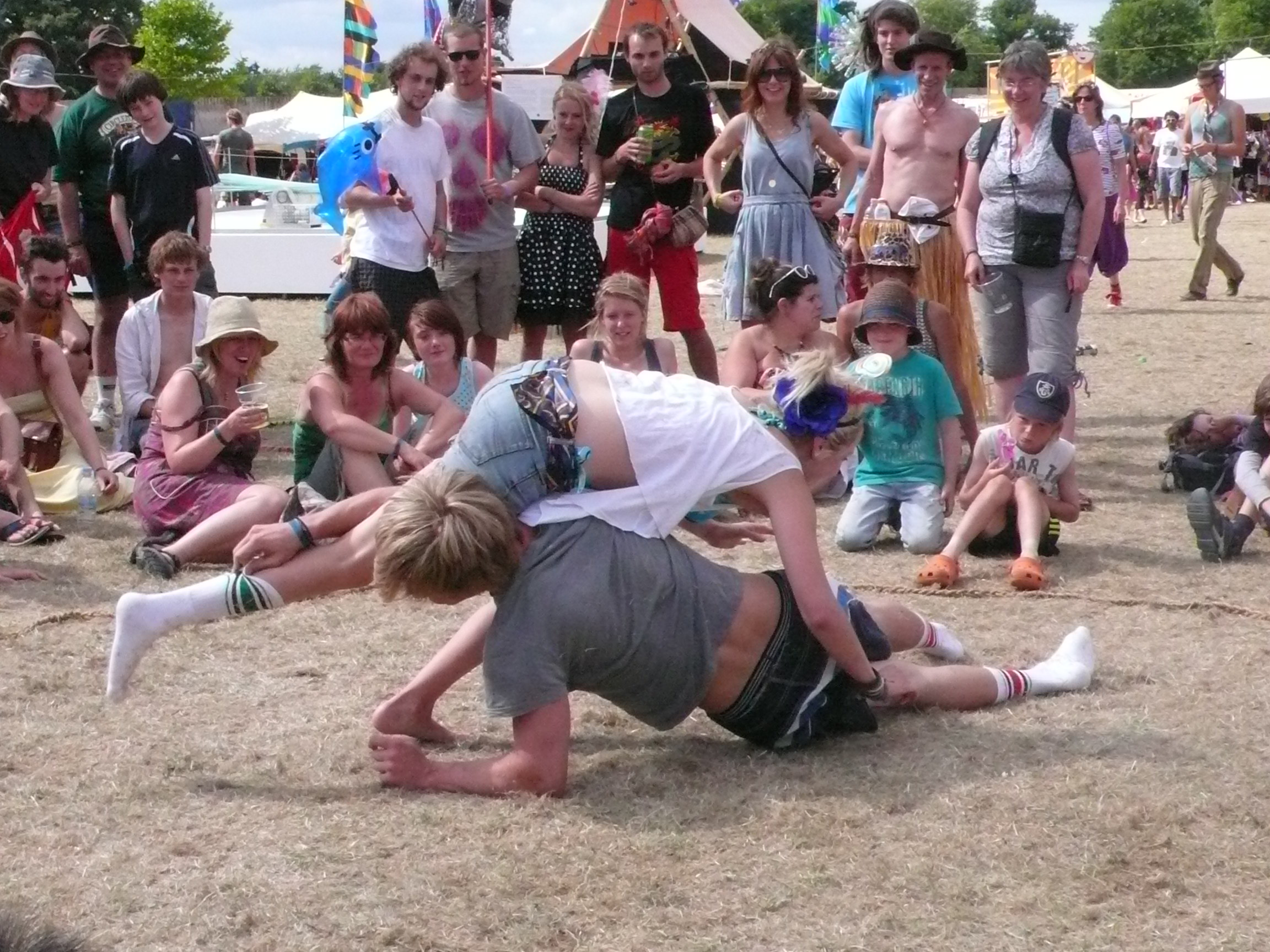

Characteristics
- Contact: Contact sport
- Type: Combat
- Equipment: Socks

Presence
- Country or region: Worldwide
- Olympic: No

Sock wrestling is a game played by at least two people, which consists of attempting to remove one or both of an opponent's socks.

There can be an unlimited number of players, who may or may not be organized into cooperating teams.

Sock wrestling is often mentioned as a good choice for recreational activity for primary education teachers or physical education classes.

== Rules ==
It is recommended that the players are above eight years old.

The two players must be sitting down or on their knees on the ground before the match starts, without footwear and wearing two socks. It is better to play on top of gym mats or a carpeted room. When the referee gives a signal to start (such as shouting "go" after a countdown of three, etc.), the match starts. It is recommended to use old socks, since there is the risk of them being damaged and torn during the game. Excessive force is not allowed.

The players then must struggle to reach the opponent's feet and remove their socks, and be careful to not have their socks removed. The first one to take one or both socks off or the one with most socks (in case of multiple players) wins.
