= Carbatina =

Ancient type of rustic footwear

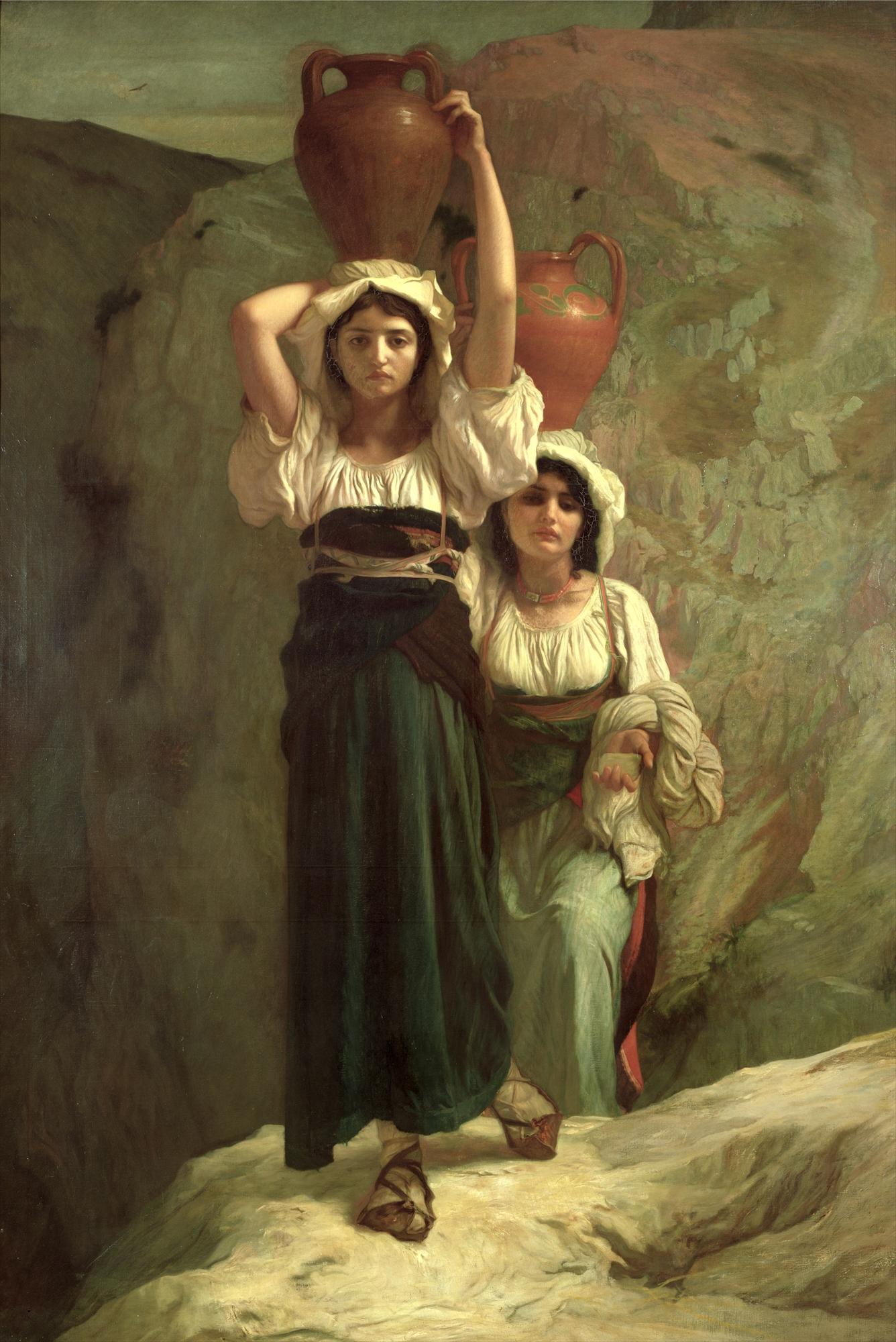
Ernest Hébert's 1855 The Girls of Alvito in the Papal States, wearing carbatinae with footwraps

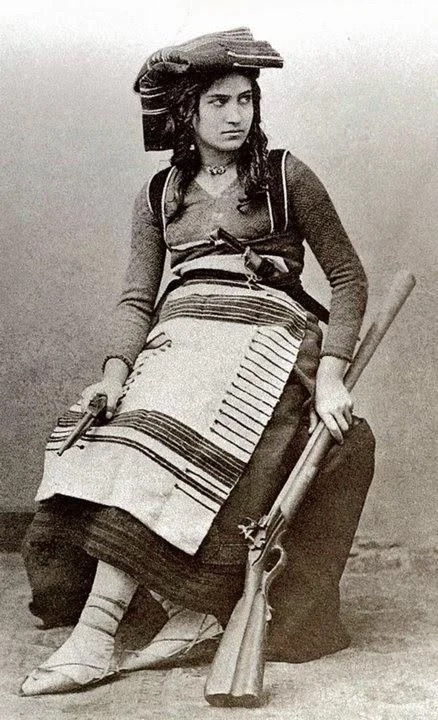
A Casertan woman circa 1860 wearing carbatina and traditional Campanian clothing

The carbatina (pl. carbatinae) was a kind of shoe common among the rural poor of ancient Greece and Rome from remote antiquity to around the 3rd century, consisting of a piece of rawhide pulled around the foot and then tied down to hold it in place. Having no upper or separate sole, the carbatina is among the simplest forms of footwear in the world and is sometimes used as a general name for similar footwear in other cultures.

== Name ==
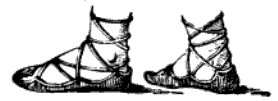
An 1884 depiction of carbatinae

Latin carbatina was a transcription of Greek karbatínē (καρβατίνη), probably cognate with kárphō (κἁρφω) and originally meaning something like "made of dried skin" or "hide". Rather than referring to all leather shoes, however, use seems to be entirely restricted to simple forms of shoes worn by the rural poor or to footwear hastily assembled from limited materials. It is used in Aristotle for a similarly basic covering used to protect the feet of camels and in Philo for a thick leather tarp used as protection by attackers during sieges.

== Design ==
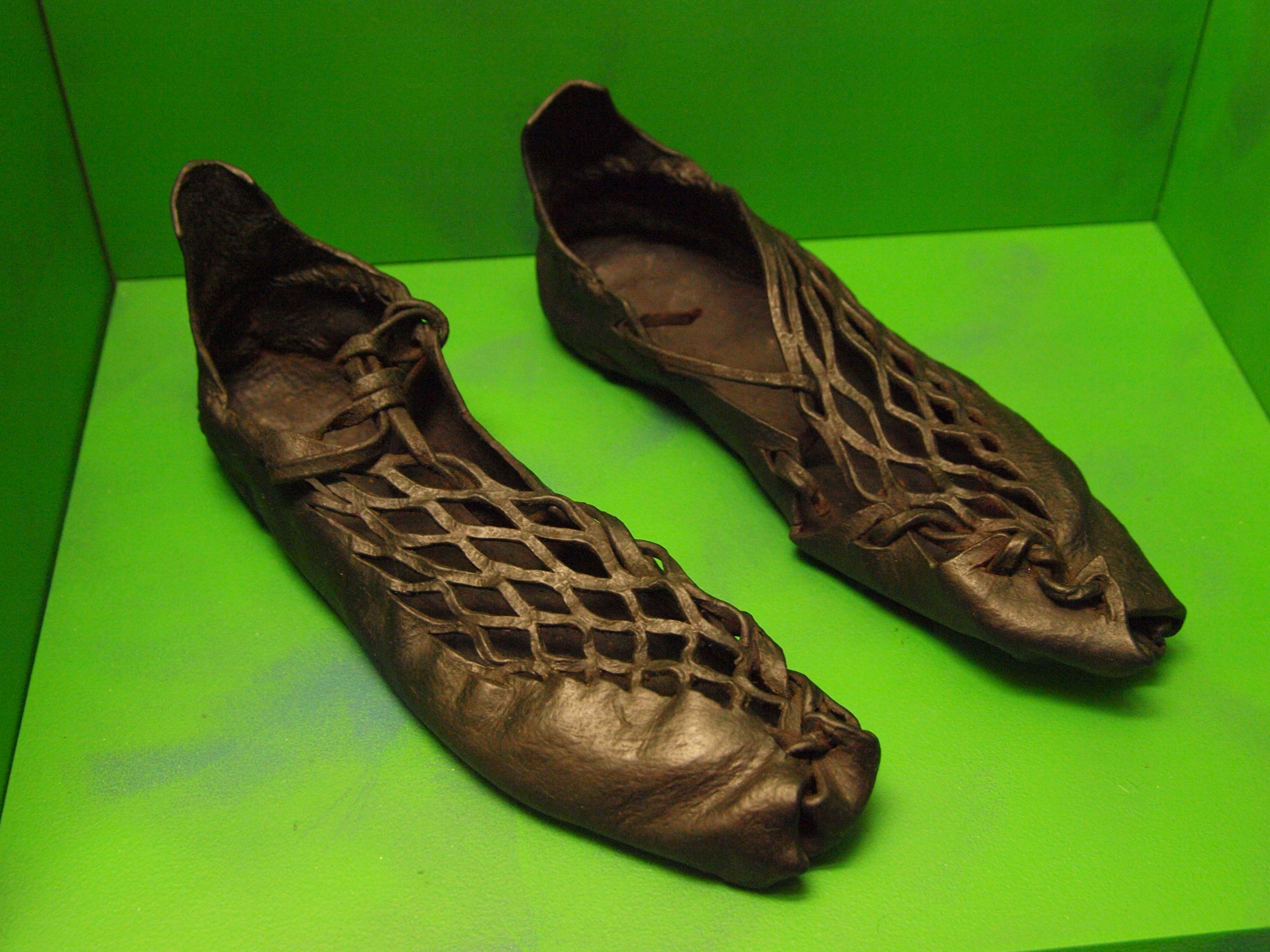
The carbatinae recovered from the bog body now known as Damendorf Man (c. 300 BC)

The usual Greek carbatina was a single piece of rawhide with the outer edge cut into thongs or having holes for thongs to be inserted. It was worn by stepping onto the open hide, pulling the sides up over the foot, and tying the thongs together to secure it. Carbatinae are sometimes mistakenly said to resemble modern ballet shoes or moccasins, but this is only true in the sense of having a simple and mostly unpadded sole. Because of the simple sole, by the medieval period carbatina-style shoes were typically worn with some form of footwrap, sock, or other padding. Simple, cheap, and requiring frequent replacement, carbatinae were seldom decorated, although one studded with openwork was recovered at Praetorium Agrippinae in the modern Netherlands and the thongs themselves could sometimes be created and interlaced in intricate ways similar to openwork.

Some authors include with carbatinae any proper leather forms or slightly more complex designs where the rawhide is raised and stitched together along one side to create a heel and provide a better fit or where the hide over the toes is stitched to strengthen it for longer use.

== History ==
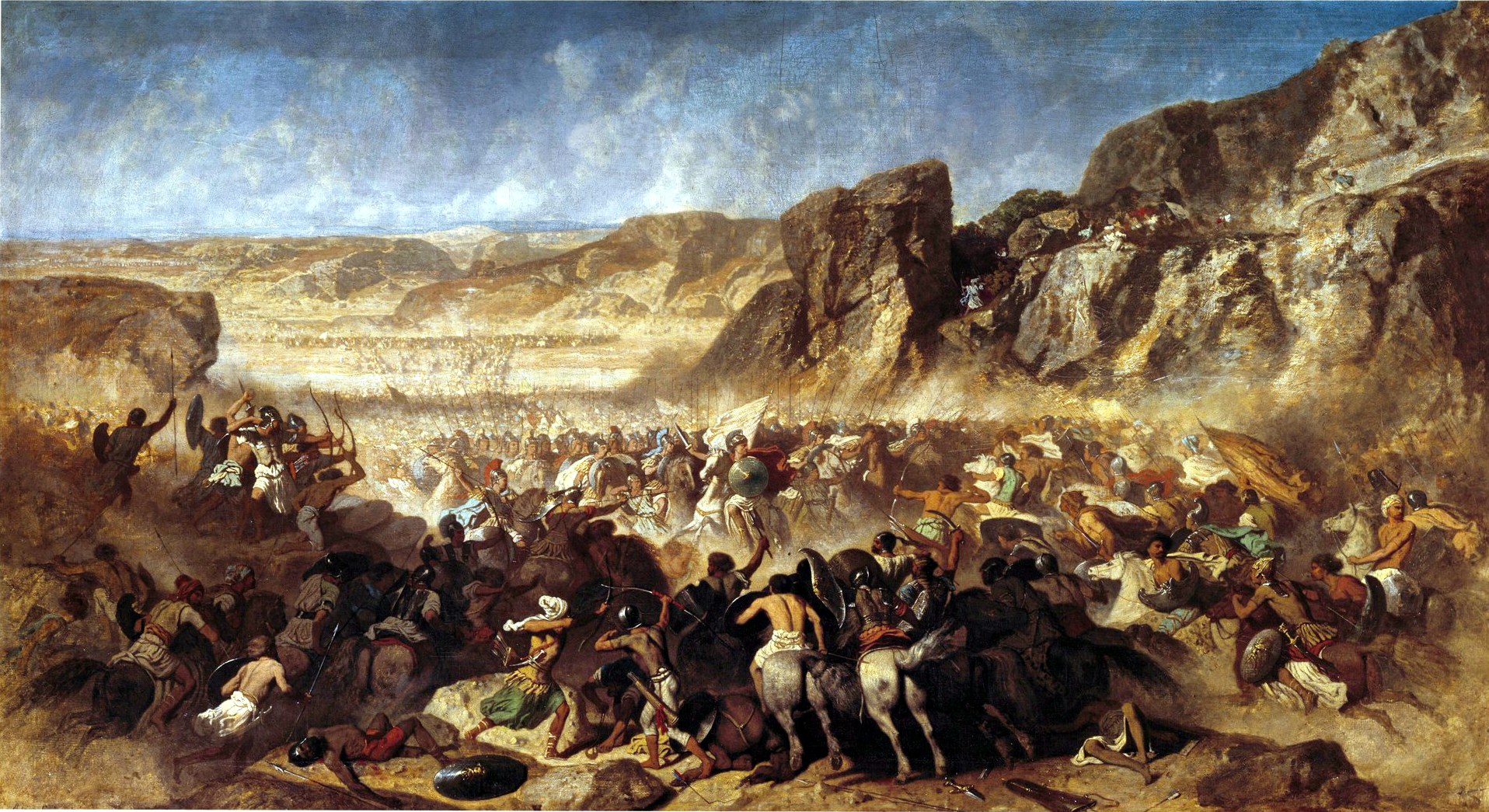
Adrien Guignet's c. 1843 Scene from the Retreat of the Ten Thousand, showing the 401 BC Battle of Cunaxa

Carbatinae were worn in antiquity by the people of the Middle East, Greece, and Roman Italy. Easily made without special tools or training, they were the emergency footwear used by the Ten Thousand mercenaries during their retreat back to Greece after the execution of their leaders by the satrap Tissaphernes. By the time of the Roman Empire, use was generally restricted to the rural poor although they remained a step up from going barefoot, which by then was a mark of extreme poverty or slavery. Carbatinae were seldom used even by poor Romans by the 3rd century, by then having been replaced by shoes, slippers, boots, and other footwear. However, equivalent shoes continued to be worn by the ancient Germans, by the subjects of their successor states, and by the rural poor generally into the Middle Ages and Early Modern Period.

== See also ==
- Clothing in ancient Greece and Rome
- History of footwear and shoes
- List of shoe styles
- Calceus, Caliga, and Soccus
- Ciocie
- Pampootie
- Abarka
