= Silicone quaternary amine =

Chemical antimicrobial agent used in some odor-repellent socks

Silicone quaternary amine is a polymeric chemical antimicrobial agent used in some odor-repellent socks, including Burlington Bioguard Socks.
