= Du Hu =

Chinese politician (born 1975)

- 杜浒

Mayor of Pengzhou
- In office June 2010 – October 2014
- Preceded by: Han Yi
- Succeeded by: Dong Li

Personal details
- Born: January 1975 (age 51) Pujiang County, Sichuan, China
- Party: Chinese Communist Party
- Education: Central Party School of the Chinese Communist Party

Du Hu (simplified Chinese: 杜浒; traditional Chinese: 杜滸; pinyin: Dù Hǔ; born January 1975) is a former Chinese politician who spent most of his career in Southwest China's Sichuan province. As of October 2014 he was under investigation by the Central Commission for Discipline Inspection. Previously he served as the Chinese Communist Party Deputy Committee Secretary and Mayor of Pengzhou.

Chinese media reported that Du had close relations with two politicians: Li Chuncheng and Gao Zhijian (Chinese: 高志坚).

== Life and career ==
Du was born and raised in Pujiang County, Sichuan. In September 1993, he enrolled in Sichuan Finance School and graduated in July 1995. After graduation, he was assigned to Industrial and Commercial Bureau of Dayi County.

In March 2008 he was promoted to become the vice-mayor of Qionglai, a position he held until March 2009, when he was transferred to Chengdu, capital of Sichuan province, and appointed the Chengdu Municipal Party Committee Secretary and Party Branch Secretary of the Communist Youth League.

In June 2010, he was transferred again to Pengzhou and appointed the Chinese Communist Party Deputy Committee Secretary, Party Branch Secretary, vice-mayor and acting mayor.

== Downfall ==
On October 30, 2014, state media announced that he was placed under investigation by the Central Commission for Discipline Inspection. He was sentenced to 10 years in prison on taking bribes worth 5.79 million yuan ($895,134).

Government offices
Preceded by Han Yi	Mayor of Pengzhou; 2010–2014	Succeeded by Dong Li
