= Sock =

Item of clothing for the feet

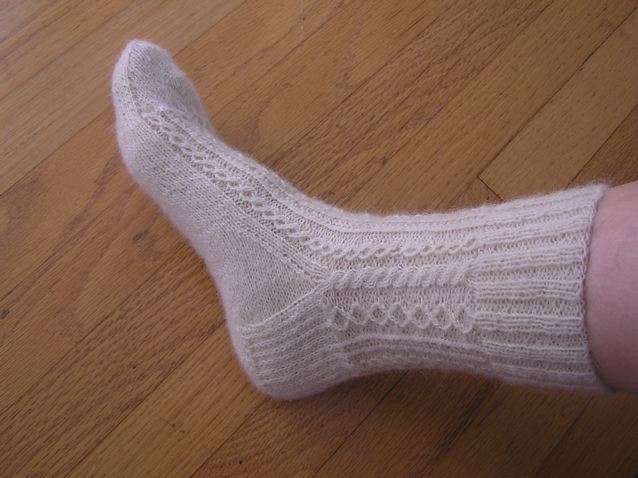
A hand-knitted sock

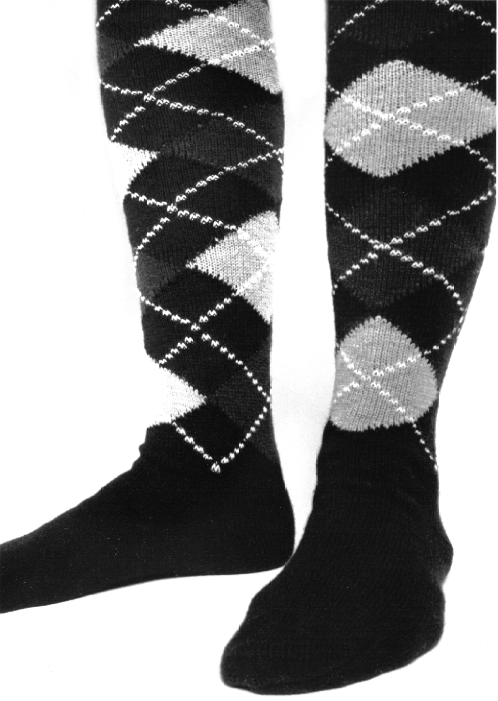
Argyle socks

A sock is a piece of clothing worn on the feet and often covering the ankle or some part of the calf. Some types of shoes or boots are typically worn over socks. In ancient times, socks were made from leather or matted animal hair. Machine-knit socks were first produced in the late 16th century. Until the 1800s, both hand-made and machine-knit socks were manufactured, with the latter technique becoming more common in the 19th century, and continuing until the modern day.

One of the roles of socks is absorbing perspiration. The foot is among the heaviest producers of sweat in the body: it can produce over 0.25 US pints (0.12 L) of perspiration per day. Socks help to absorb this sweat and draw it to areas where air can evaporate the perspiration. They also protect shoes, a more expensive, durable, and frequently reworn foot covering, from perspiration, extending their life.

In cold environments, warm socks help people avoid getting cold feet, which in turn helps decrease the risk of getting frostbite. Thin socks are most commonly worn in the summer months to keep feet cool.

In men's fashion, light-colored socks are typically worn with sports shoes and dark-colored socks with dress shoes (often black or navy blue dress socks). Fanciful sock designs are becoming more common.

== Etymology ==
The modern English word sock is derived from the Old English word socc, meaning "light slipper". This comes from the Latin soccus, a term to describe a "light, low-heeled shoe" worn by Roman comic actors, and deriving from the Ancient Greek word sykchos.

== History ==
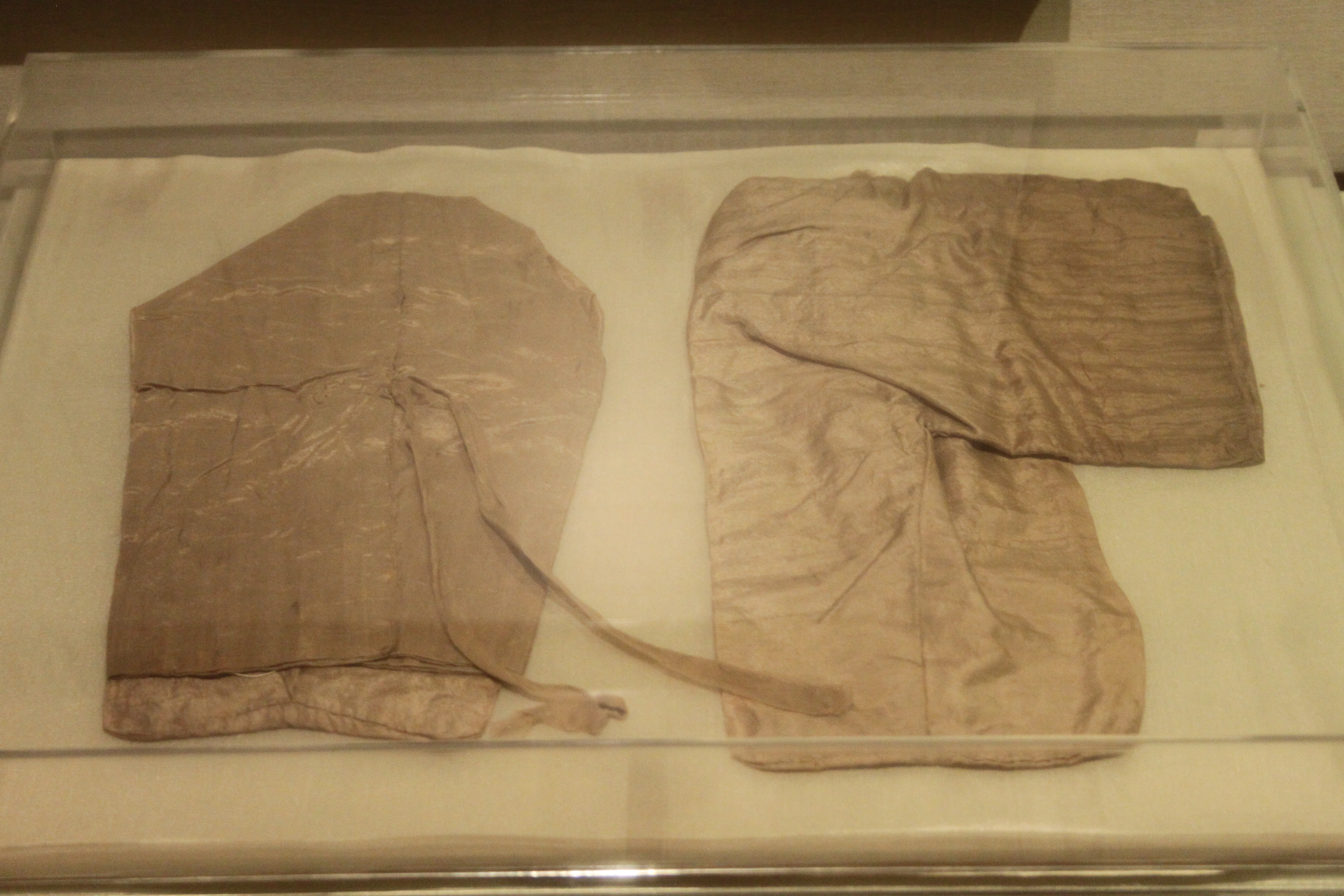
Silk woven socks from the Mawangdui tomb, Western Han, 2nd century BC. Ancient Chinese socks are loose fitting and were tied with strings at the back.

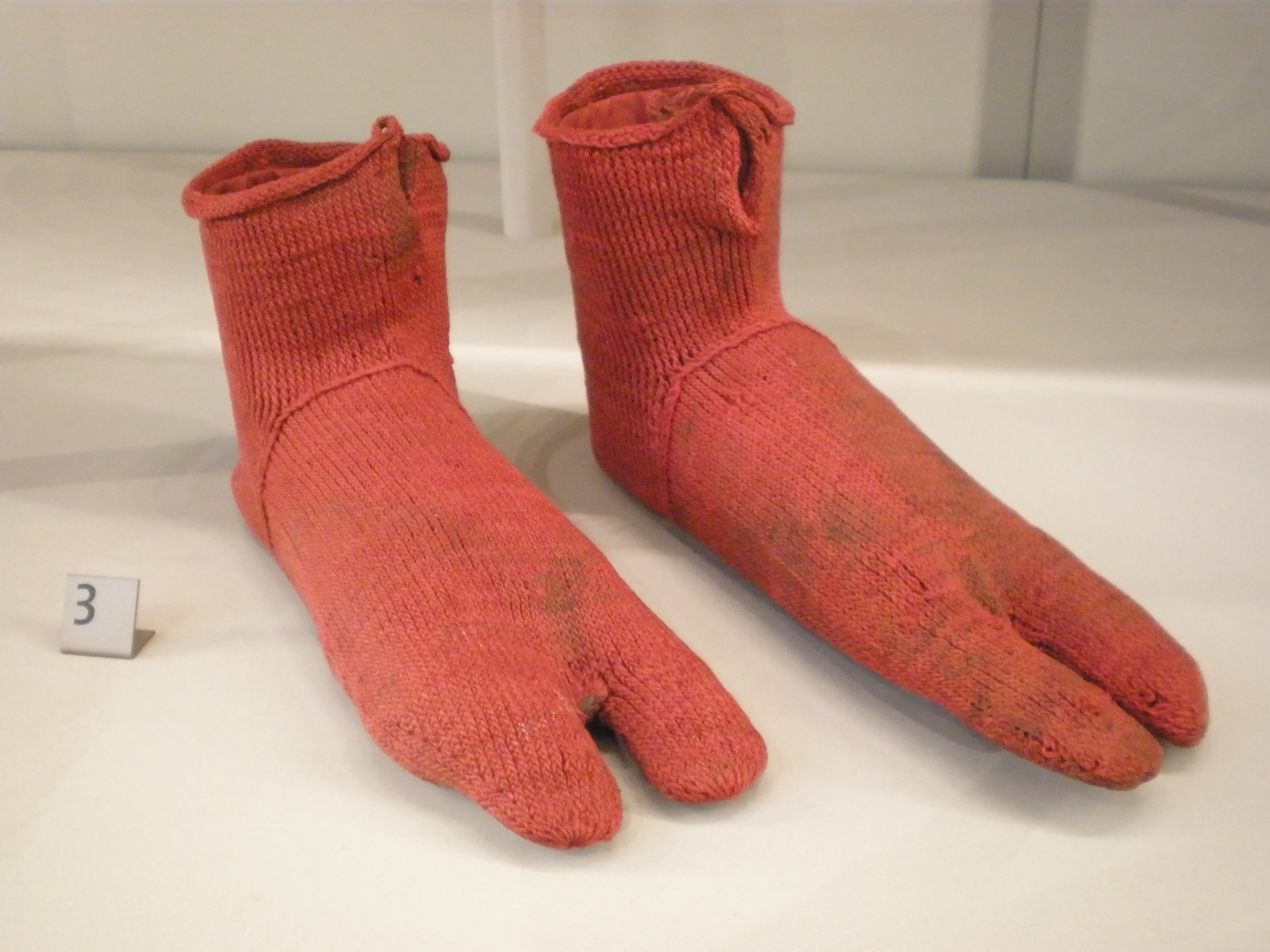
Egyptian socks created by naalbinding. Dating from 300 to 500, these were excavated from Oxyrhynchus on the Nile in Egypt. The split toes were designed for use with sandals. On display in the Victoria and Albert museum, reference 2085&A-1900.

12th-century cotton sock, found in Egypt. The knitter of this sock started work at the toe and then worked up towards the leg. The heel was made last and then attached to loops formed while knitting the leg. This practice allowed the heel to be easily replaced when it wore out.

Socks have evolved over the centuries from the earliest models, which were made from animal skins gathered up and tied around the ankles in the manner of the later Greek and Roman carbatinae shoes. Because the manufacture of socks was relatively time-consuming in preindustrial times, they were long used only by the rich. The poor wore footwraps, simple cloths wrapped around the feet. These remained in use in Eastern European armies until the end of the 20th century.

According to the Greek poet Hesiod, in the 8th century BC, the Ancient Greeks wore socks called "piloi", which were made from matted animal hair. The Romans also wrapped their feet with leather or woven fabrics. Around the 2nd century AD, the Romans started sewing the fabrics together making fitted socks called "udones". By the 5th century AD, socks called "puttees" were worn by holy people in Europe to symbolize purity.

During the Middle Ages, the length of trousers was extended and the sock became a tight, brightly colored cloth covering the lower part of the leg. Since socks did not have an elastic band, garters were placed over the top of the stockings to prevent them from falling down. When breeches became shorter, socks began to get longer (and more expensive). By AD 1000, socks became a symbol of wealth among the nobility. From the 16th century onwards, an ornamental design on the ankle or side of a sock has been called a "clock". The invention of a knitting machine in 1589 meant that socks could be knitted faster.

The next revolution in sock production was the introduction of nylon in 1938. Until then socks were commonly made from silk, cotton and wool. Nylon was the start of blending two or more yarns in the production of socks, a process that still continues today.

=== Footwraps ===
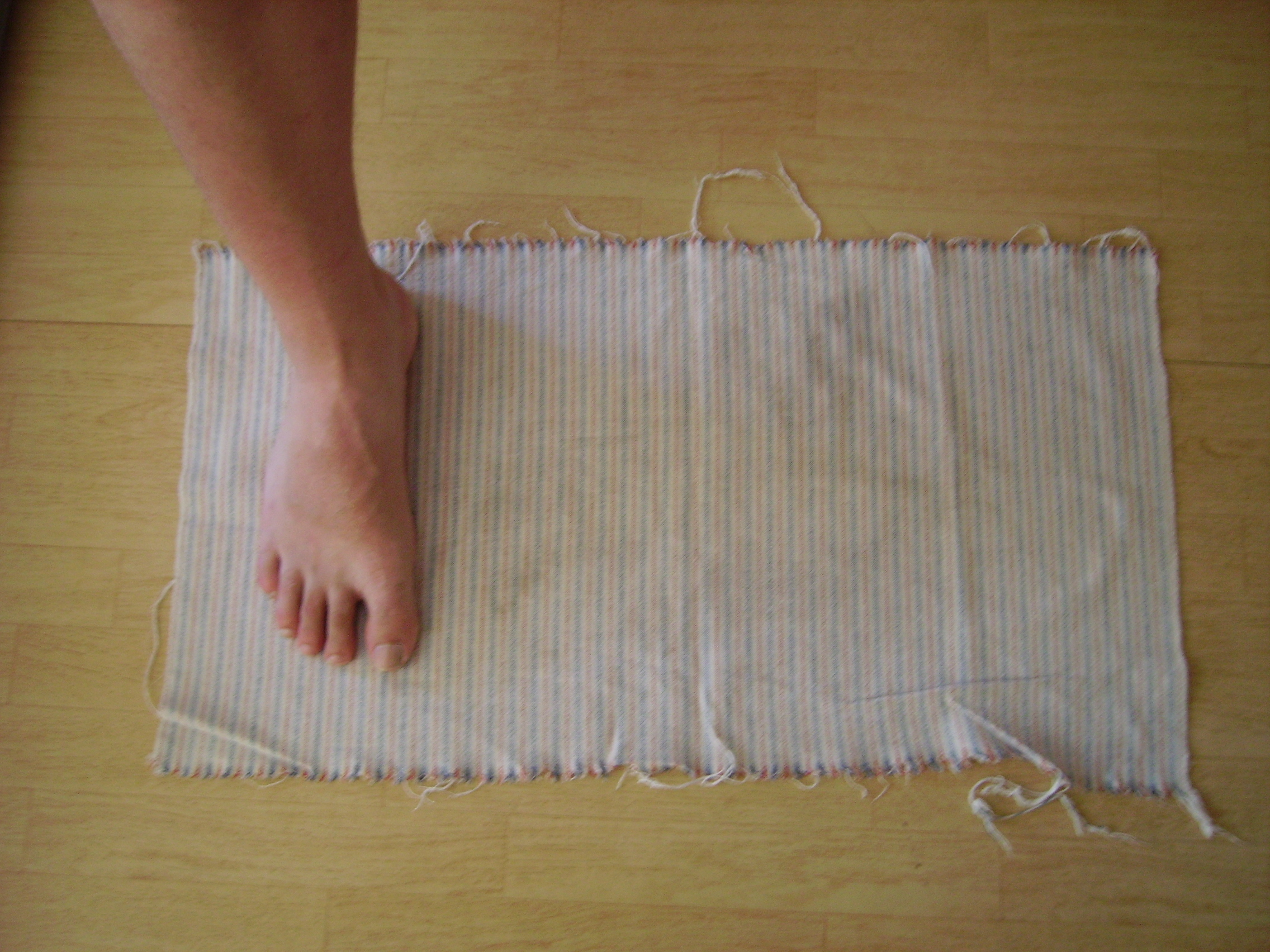
Footwraps used by the Finnish Army until the 1990s

Footwraps, pieces of cloth that are worn wrapped around the feet, were worn with boots before socks became widely available. They remained in use by armies in Eastern Europe until the beginning of the 21st century.

== Fabrication ==
Socks can be made from a wide variety of materials, such as cotton, wool, nylon, acrylic, polyester and olefins (such as polypropylene). To get an increased level of softness other materials that might be used during the process can be silk, bamboo, linen, cashmere, or mohair. Merino wool is a popular fabric choice that offers warmth and comfort to socks, and retains its shape better when blended with other materials. Socks can be made in any color/colors. Colored socks may be a part of a uniform for sports, allowing players teams to be distinguished when only their legs are clearly visible.

Fort Payne, Alabama, is regarded as the "sock capital of the world" as nearly half of socks manufactured in the early 21st century were made here. The Fort Payne sock industry employed about 7000 workers at its peak around the year 2000. Fort Payne remains among the leading hosiery centers, contributing roughly a quarter of the global output, while Datang, China now holds the top position.

The township-level district of Datang in the city of Zhuji in Zhejiang Province, People's Republic of China, has become known as Sock City. The town currently produces 8 billion pairs of socks each year, a third of the world's sock production, effectively creating two pairs of socks for every person on the planet in 2011.

== Types and styles ==
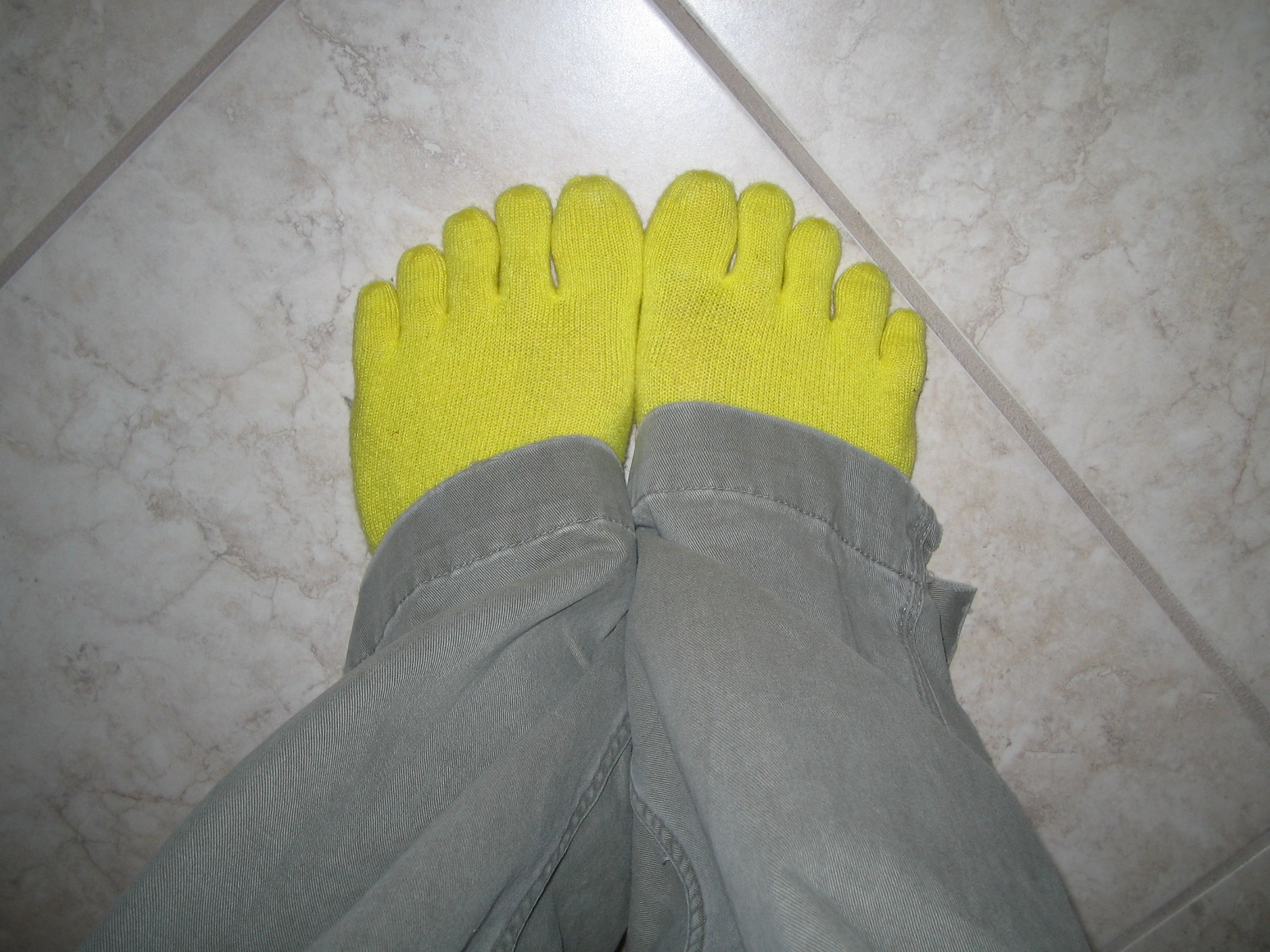
Toe socks

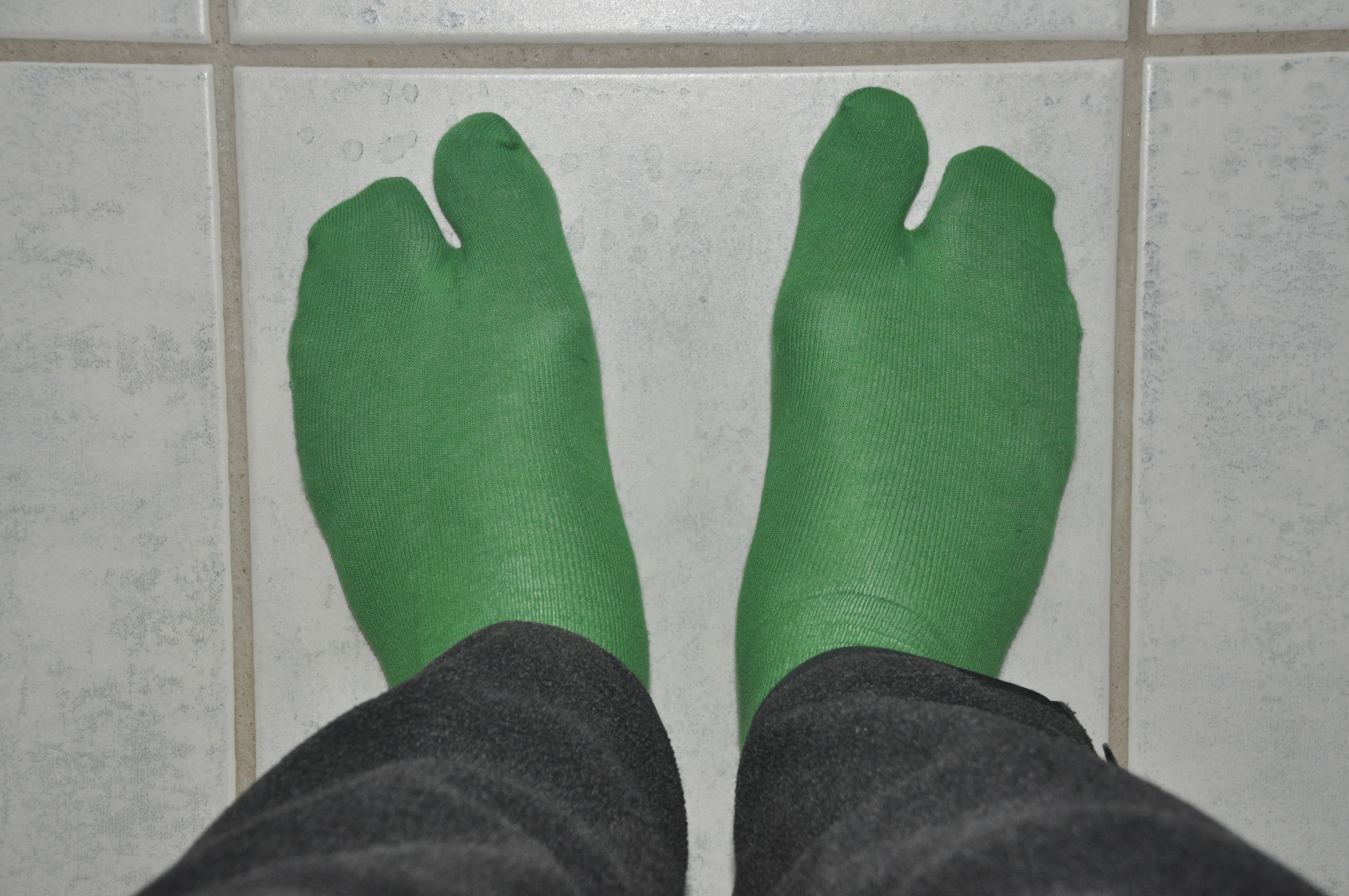
Flip-flops socks

Socks are manufactured in a variety of lengths. No show, low-cut, and ankle socks extend to the ankle or lower and are often worn casually or for athletic use. No show and low-cut socks are designed to create the look of bare feet when worn with shoes (sock not visible). Knee-high socks are sometimes associated with formal dress or as being part of a uniform, such as in sports (like football and baseball) or as part of a school's dress code or youth group's uniform. Over-the-knee socks or socks that extend higher (thigh-high socks) are sometimes referred to as female garments in the common era. They were widely worn by children, both boys and girls, during the late 19th and early 20th centuries; although, the popularity varied widely from country to country. Knee-high or thigh-high socks are sometimes the object of sexual attraction and underwear fetishism. Liner socks are socks which are worn underneath another sock with the intention being to prevent blisters.

=== Toe socks ===
Toe socks encase each toe individually the same way a finger is encased in a glove. Some other socks have one compartment for the big toe and one for the rest, like a mitten, such as Japanese tabi or, in other parts of the world, split-toe socks. Both of these can be worn with flip-flops with the socks.

=== Business and dress socks ===
A business sock or dress sock is a term for a dark-colored sock (typically black or navy blue) for formal or casual footwear. It is often loosely referred to as a work sock or a formal sock for formal occasions, for example, weddings, funerals, graduation ceremonies, prom, church, or work.

=== Crew socks ===
Crew socks are short, everyday socks. Those socks are usually ribbed at the top of the ankles. The first usage of the phrase crew socks was in 1948. Crew socks are usually unisex.

=== Low cut socks ===
A low cut sock is a kind of sock that finishes below the ankle. Low cut socks are formed to cover the contours of a person's feet. Low cut socks are discreet and often worn with a variety of shoes, including sneakers, loafers, and even dress shoes.

=== Egyptian socks ===
The Ancient Egyptian style of sock is a blend between modern Western socks and Japanese tabi, both of which it predates. Like tabi, Egyptian socks have one compartment for the big toe and another for the rest, permitting their use with sandals. Like Western socks, they fit snugly to the foot and do not use fasteners like tabi.

=== Sports socks ===
Most sports require some sort of sock, usually a knee length or mid-calf sock to protect one's legs from being scraped while participating in sport activities. Tube socks are often worn for sports. In football, knee socks are mostly used.

=== Thermal socks ===
For use in cold environments, thermal socks are thicker. They are commonly worn for skiing, skating, and other winter sports. They provide not only insulation, but also greater padding due to their thickness.

=== Diabetic socks ===
Diabetic socks are a kind of thermal sock made from an acrylic, cotton, nylon, and elastic. These are made to improve comfort while at the same time keeping feet cool and dry. However, there is no solid evidence that they are helpful.

=== Non-slip socks ===
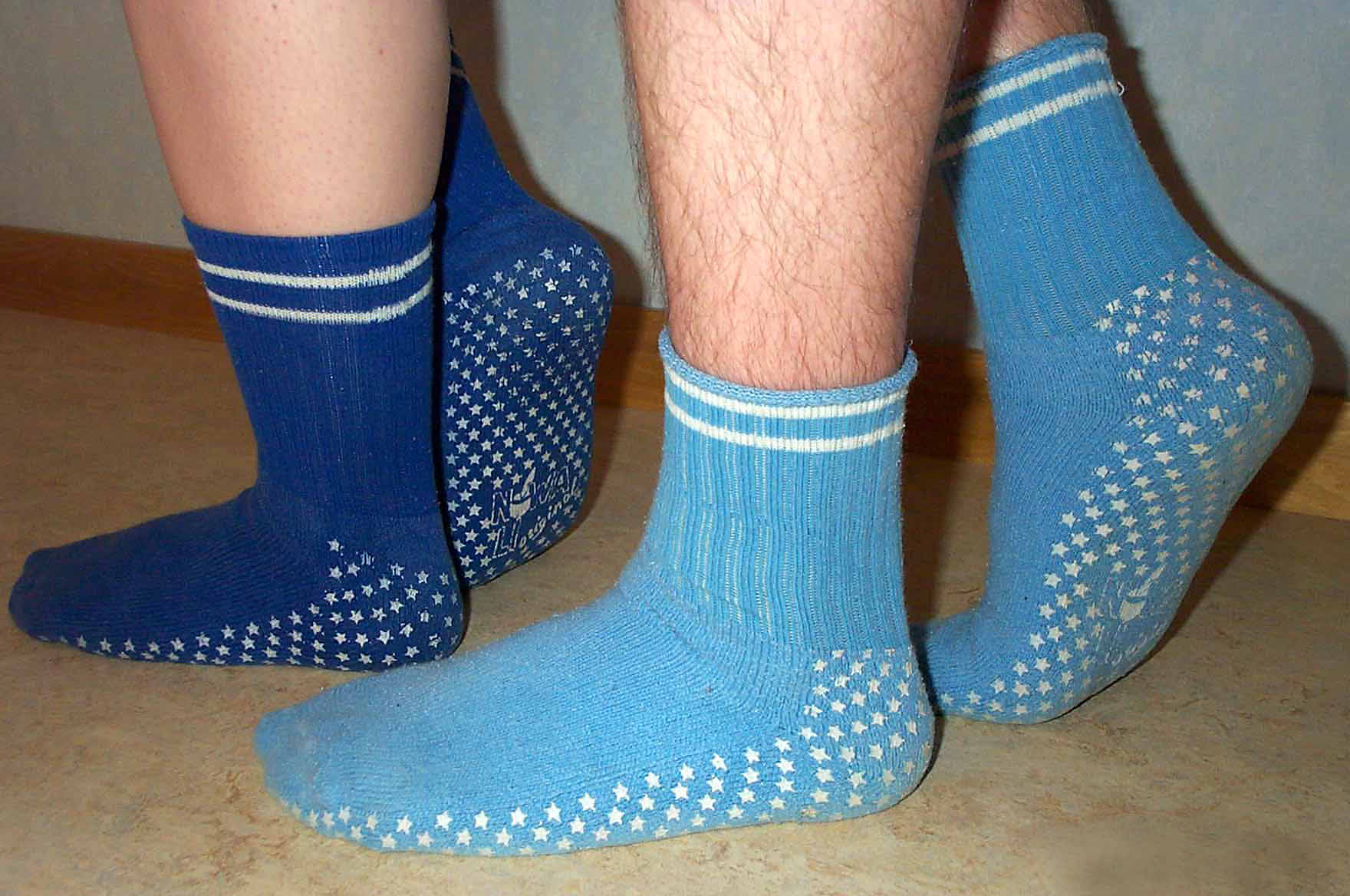
Swedish non-skid socks from Nowali

Non-slip socks are socks with non-slip features, such as a rubber tread, to prevent slips and falls. They are also known as hospital socks, psych ward socks or grippy socks, as they are commonly issued at hospitals, psychiatric facilities, and nursing homes. Patients can sometimes arrive at hospital by ambulance without footwear. Non-slip socks are intended as alternative footwear to help prevent falls, though evidence of effectiveness is inconclusive.

== Smell ==
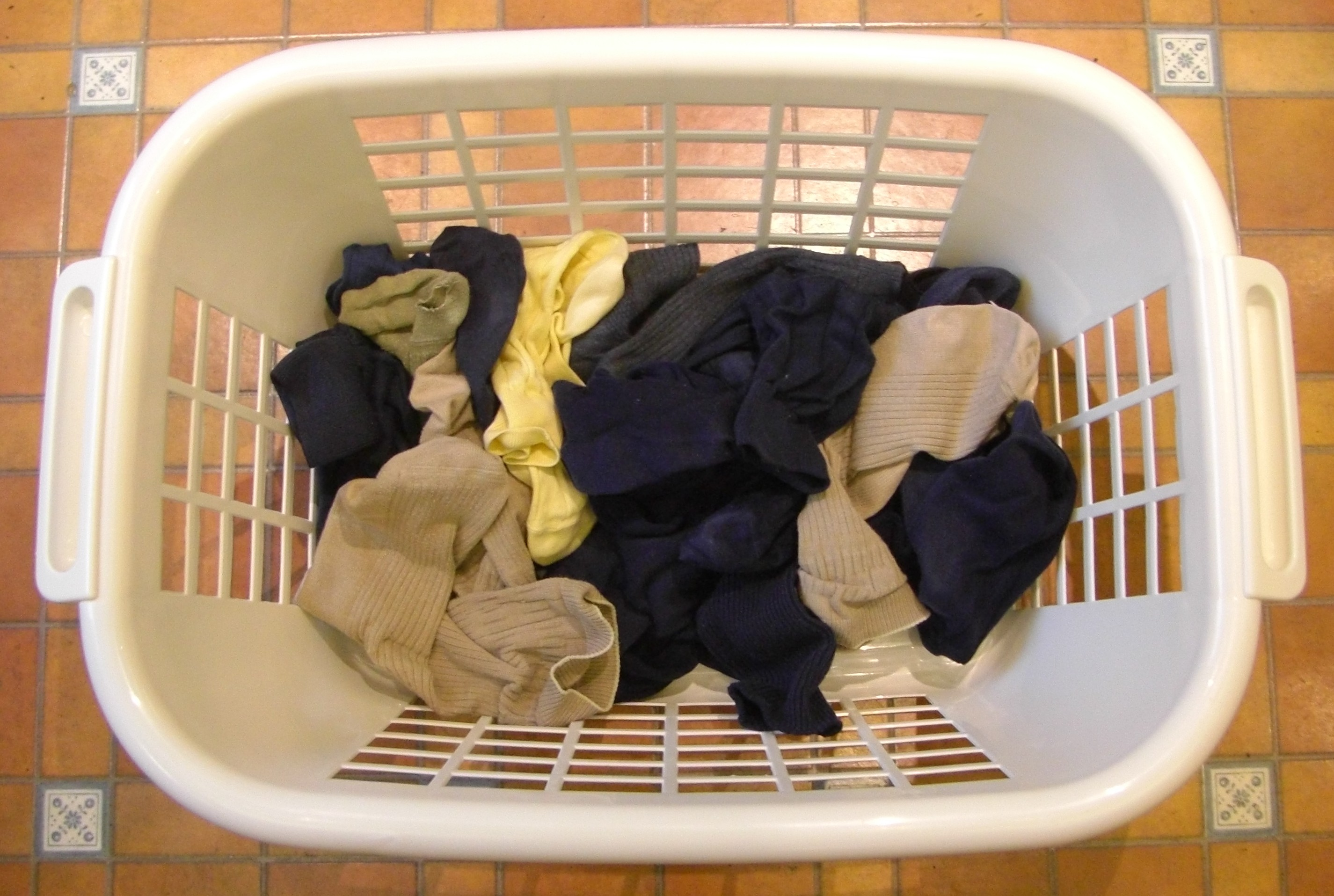
Smelly socks in a laundry basket

Socks can acquire a foul odor due to prolonged wearing on feet. Their odor, which is complex and remains the object of study, is a mixture of ammonia, fatty acids (in particular, isovaleric acid), and lactic acid. Odorous socks are a strong attractant for some animals, including dogs and mosquitos. They have proven useful in controlling the behaviour of these animals.

Although the odour of smelly socks is often associated with feet, it arises independently of contact with human feet in various foodstuffs, such as dairy products, cheeses, sausages and fish sauce, and is naturally present in several plants. The smell has also been noted in building and automotive air treatment systems, where it is described as "jock socks odour" or "dirty socks syndrome". Several technologies have been developed to incorporate materials into sock textiles which reduce or eliminate the strong smell.

The intense smell commonly results from bacterial action upon sweat which accumulates due to confining footwear. It has also presented itself as a problem among users of prosthetics. Smelly socks may be a source of air contamination in aircraft and dwellings. Their distinctive odour is commonly used as a reference. A 1996 Popular Mechanics article describes "jock socks odour" complaints as one of the magazine's most frequent queries with regard to automotive air conditioning systems, attributing it to fungal growth within the auto. The term "Dirty Sock Syndrome" is used to describe unpleasant odours that arise in building heating and cooling systems. High-efficiency heat pumps in the southeastern US have been noted as frequent offenders.

The odour is a diagnostic feature of a serious medical condition, Isovaleric acidemia. A widespread consumer perception of the odour in the medication metformin, frequently used to treat Type 2 diabetes, may have contributed to patient refusals of the treatment. A test of olfactory abilities deemed useful in Japan employs detection of "sweaty socks", along with two other odours, as a useful metric of these abilities. When fresh, alkyl nitrites or "poppers", smell fruity, but when stale their aroma seems like smelly socks.

=== Solutions ===
Several technologies have been developed to address the problem by modifying the composition of sock materials. Compounds which cause socks to smell intensively include:

1. butyric acid, which smells like rancid butter
2. dimethyl disulphide, which smells like onions
3. dimethyl trisulphide
4. 2-heptanone, which smells like bananas
5. 2-nonanone, which smells like fat, fruit or flowers
6. 2-octanone, which smells like apples

In February 1997, the Daily Mirror reported that a new fabric had been invented by British scientists to eliminate smelly socks. Disinfectant treatments such as silver nanoparticles may be applied to socks to prevent them from smelling. The United States Air Force Academy issued a 2009 request to vendors that included socks incorporating antimicrobial silver yarn technology. This technology has encountered some opposition; a study conducted by researchers at Arizona State University examined the possibility that the silver particles could be released when the socks were washed, posing environmental concerns. In 2000, the University of California announced a joint venture with private companies to develop socks that would reduce the problem by incorporating halamine compounds, a relatively stable form of chlorine. In 2005 Dow Corning proposed the incorporation of alkoxysilanes as a preventive measure.

Researchers reported, in 2011, on a technique to permanently block the development of pathogenic germs, which can cause odour in socks and other clothing. A team led by Jason Lockli of the University of Georgia reported in the American Chemical Society's Applied Materials and Interfaces that the anti-microbial treatment of "smelly socks" could "offer low cost protection for healthcare facilities, such as hospitals."

=== Animal attraction ===
In a study of the odours most likely to attract mosquitos, smelly socks were found to be the most effective, topping the list along with Limburger cheese. Their strong odour will also attract other dangerous wild animals such as bears.

Because this smell is so effective at attracting mosquitos, its use has been explored for mosquito control in places where malaria is prevalent. An imitation foot odour has been synthesised at the University of Wageningen. The synthetic odour is then used to bait traps which attract the mosquitos and so divert them from biting people. The synthetic mixture of ammonia, fatty acids, and lactic acid is effective but not as good as real sweaty socks. The composition of the authentic smell is still being analysed to determine the remaining active ingredients. A project in Kenya funded by Grand Challenges Canada and the Bill & Melinda Gates Foundation involves harvesting smelly sock odour with cotton pads that are then used to bait traps.

The East African jumping spider or vampire spider preys upon mosquitos which have fed upon blood. It is attracted to the same smell for this reason and this has been demonstrated using an olfactometer which was loaded alternately with clean and smelly socks.

Dogs are strongly attracted to the scent of socks that have been worn by humans. They may self-medicate themselves during attacks of separation anxiety by focusing on these items. The attraction is used in dog training, where the odorous socks may serve as a distractant or as a lure during crate training.

Smelly socks have been used to repel deer. Benefits include they are cheap and accessible, require little effort to put out each morning, and are quite effective at keeping deer out of one's flower garden.

=== Other uses ===
The smell of dirty socks was the most unpleasant of the smells provided in the movie Polyester which featured Odorama in the form of scratch and sniff cards. At Fort Siloso in Singapore, the liquid scent of smelly socks is part of the exhibition which provides tourists with a sensory impression of its historical use during WW2.

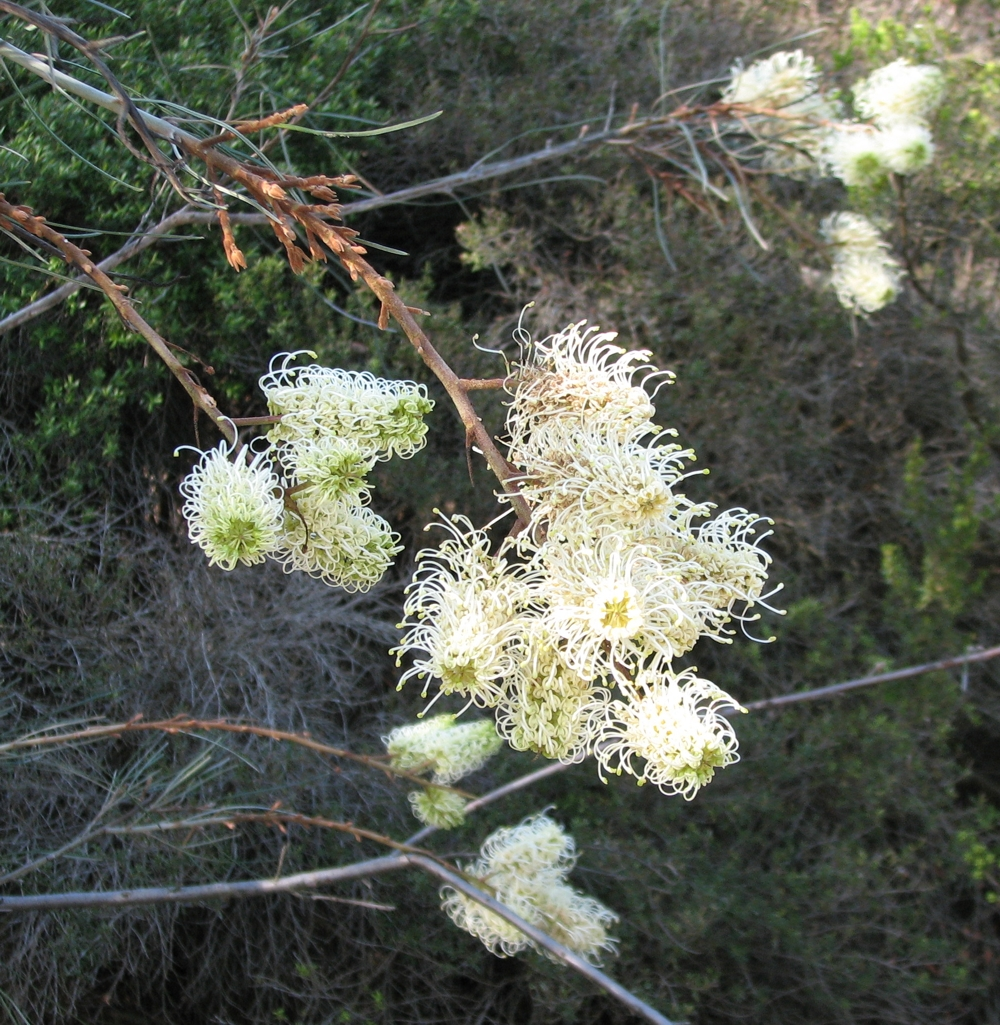
Smelly socks grevillea

The plant white plume grevillea (Grevillea leucopteris) has long white flowers whose stink resembles that of smelly socks, causing the plant to be known as "smelly socks grevillea" or "old socks". Another plant with a similar smell and name is clary sage (Salvia sclarea). The herb valerian has a musty smell of this sort too. Mushrooms of the genus Amanita often have a strong odor which may also seem like that of smelly socks.

Some people experience erotic arousal from smelling well worn socks as a fetish. It is one of the most widespread forms of olfactophilia. In a 1994 study, 45% of those with a foot fetish were found to be aroused by smelly socks. Those aroused by smelling socks may be aroused only by a certain type of sock, those worn by a particular person or type of person, or in specific scenarios, such as being dominated or instructed to smell socks.

Smelly socks are favoured for use as a component in the making of powerful charms or spells, especially in voodoo or magic of African origin. They may be worn around the neck as a cure for a cold.

Smelly socks were used as the basis for a marketing campaign for British Knights sneakers. Viewers were invited to send in their socks which would then be assessed for smell by a panel of judges which included a dog.

== Sizes ==
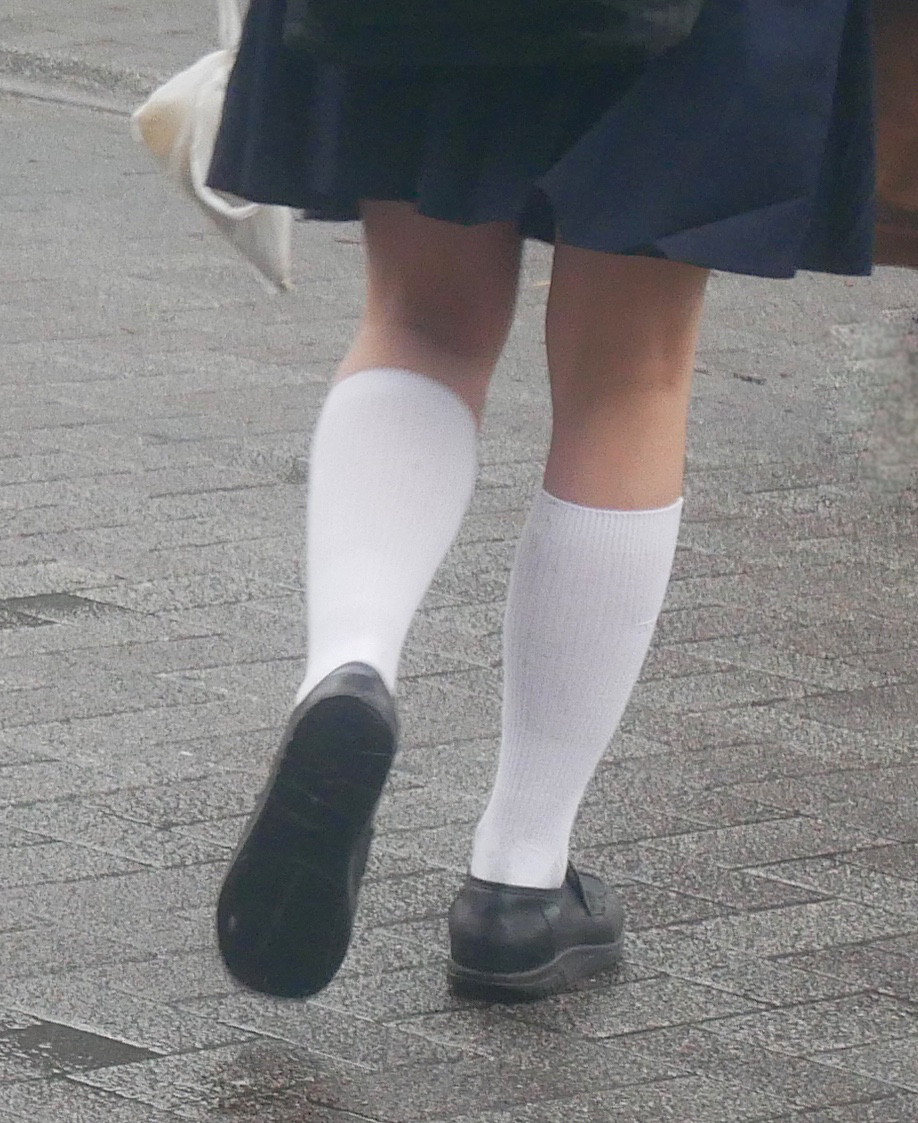
Knee-high white socks, often worn as part of a school uniform or for fashion

Although generally holding to a pattern of being divided into sizes of small-medium-large, etc., what range of shoe sizes those sock sizes correspond to carries in different markets. Some size standards are coordinated by standard-setting bodies but others have arisen from custom. Sock lengths vary, from ankle-high to thigh level.

== Religious significance ==
=== Christianity ===
A sock is also used as a holiday item during Christmas. Children hang a large ceremonial sock called a Christmas stocking by a nail or hook on Christmas Eve, and then their parents fill it with small presents while the recipients are asleep. According to tradition, Santa Claus brings these presents to well-behaved children, while naughty kids instead receive coal.

=== Islam ===
Among Muslims, socks have initiated a discussion about the intricacies of wudhu, the formal washing carried out before prayer. Some Muslim clerics, mindful of possible hardship among Muslims in inhospitable circumstances, have issued Muslim edicts permitting practicing Muslims to wipe water over their sock or sprinkle their sock. This would allow prayer where there are no seating facilities, or if there is a queue. This is the stated opinion especially of Maliki Sunnis.

== Other uses of the word and slang ==
The layer of leather or other material covering the insole of a shoe is also referred to as a sock. When only part of the insole is covered, leaving the forepart visible, this is known as a half-sock.

Young people on social media commonly refer to non-slip hospital socks as "grippy socks". Slang terms for in-patient psychiatric hospitalization may include "grippy sock vacation", "grippy sock palace", "grippy sock jail", and "grippy sock hotel". Mental health professionals have expressed concern that such black humor may trivialize or romanticize the experience of psychiatric hospitalization. Some feel that tongue-in-cheek terms like "grippy sock vacation" can help destigmatize mental illness. Tags for "grippy socks" are a popular mental health-related tag on TikTok, where the tags have several hundred million views.

== See also ==
- American Civil War sock campaign
- Beoseon (traditional Korean socks)
- Body odor
- Body odour and sexual attraction
- Foot fetishism
- Hospital socks
- Leg warmer
- Leggings
- Loose sock
- Missing sock
- Puttee
- Sock puppet
- Socks and sandals
- Stocking
- Tabi
- Tights
