= Pampootie =

Irish rawhide shoe

Pampooties are rawhide shoes, which were formerly made and worn on the Aran Islands of County Galway, Ireland.

== History ==
They are formed of a single piece of untanned hide folded around the foot and stitched with twine or a leather strap.

Hide from the buttocks was most often used. The hair was usually left and this improved the shoe's grip. The raw hide is kept flexible by use and the constant damp conditions of Western Ireland. However the shoes are not made to last. They are prone to rot and were usually kept for as little as a month or less.

Pampooties are similar to the Scottish cuaran shoes, and are the precursors to ghillies, Celtic dance shoes. They are also similar in appearance to American moccasins. Ancient shoes found preserved from Stone Age Europe have a similar design.

The name "pampootie" is of unclear origin; it may be related to Turkish papoosh, a kind of slipper. The Aran Islanders simply called them brógaí úrleathair, "shoes of undressed leather."

== See also ==
- Carbatina
- List of shoe styles
- Irish clothing
