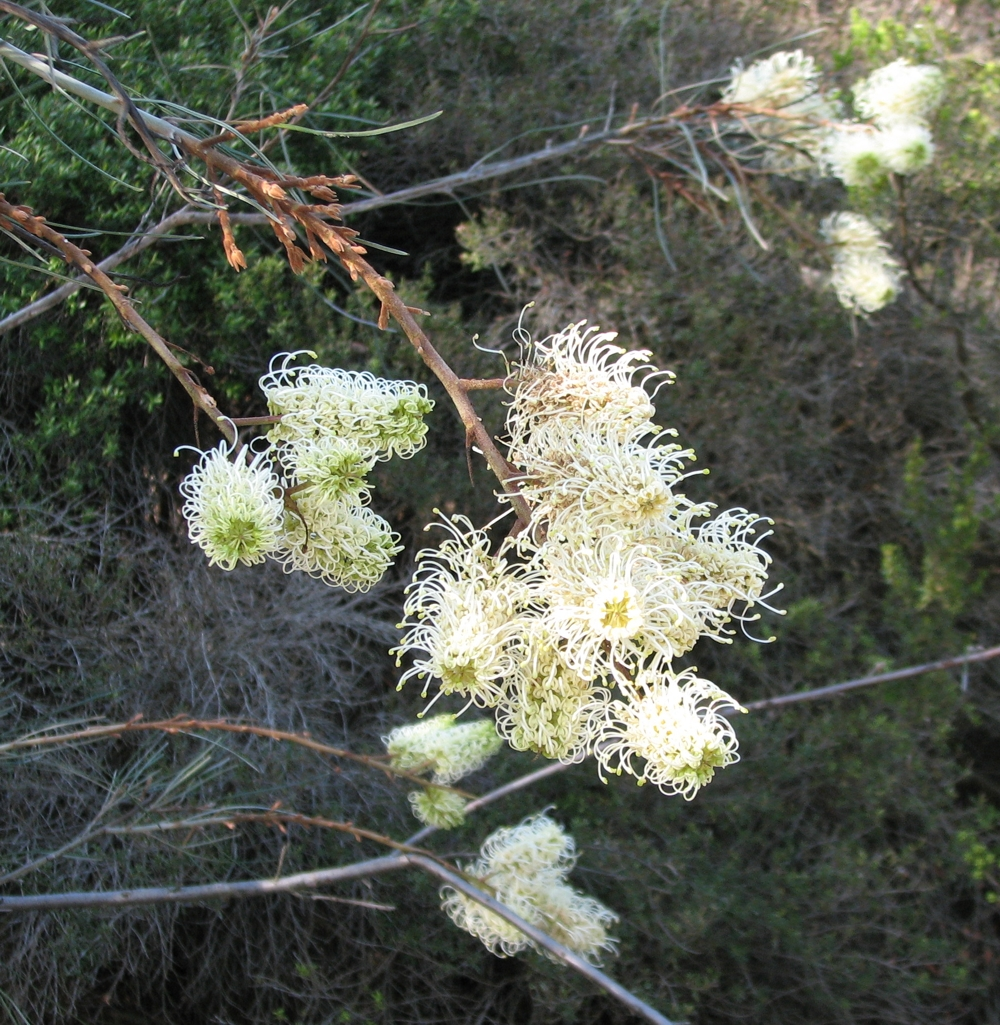
- In Maranoa Gardens

Conservation status
- Least Concern (IUCN 3.1)

Scientific classification
- Kingdom: Plantae
- Clade: Embryophytes
- Clade: Tracheophytes
- Clade: Angiosperms
- Clade: Eudicots
- Order: Proteales
- Family: Proteaceae
- Genus: Grevillea
- Species: G. leucopteris

Binomial name
- Grevillea leucopteris Meisn.

Synonyms
- Grevillea segmentosa F.Muell.

= Grevillea leucopteris =

Species of shrub endemic to Western Australia

Grevillea leucopteris, also known as old socks or white plume grevillea, is a species of flowering plant in the family Proteaceae and is endemic to the south-west of Western Australia. It is a spreading, bushy shrub with divided leaves with erect, linear lobes and clusters of white to cream-coloured flowers displayed above the foliage.

== Description ==
Grevillea leucopteris is a spreading, bushy shrub that typically grows to a height of 1–5 m (3 ft 3 in – 16 ft 5 in). Its leaves are 120–350 mm (4.7–13.8 in) long and simple or divided with 11 to 23 erect, the simple leaves or linear lobes, 50–210 mm (2.0–8.3 in) long and 0.9–1.8 mm (0.035–0.071 in) wide. The flowers are arranged on the ends of flowering stems displayed above the foliage, each flowering stem with five to fourteen branches, each branch 100–150 mm (3.9–5.9 in) long. The flowers are white to cream-coloured, the pistil 25–33 mm (0.98–1.30 in) long. The flowers have a strong sweet, yet unpleasant smell that is most pronounced at night. Flowering mainly occurs from July to January and the fruit is a smooth, oblong follicle 20–24 mm (0.79–0.94 in) long.

== Taxonomy ==
Grevillea leucopteris was first formally described in 1855 by Carl Meissner in Hooker's Journal of Botany and Kew Garden Miscellany from specimens collected by James Drummond. The specific epithet (leucopteris) means "white-winged", referring to the seeds.

== Distribution and habitat ==
Old socks grows in heath and shrubland and is found from the lower Murchison River to near Marchagee in the Avon Wheatbelt, Geraldton Sandplains, Swan Coastal Plain and Yalgoo bioregions of south-western Western Australia.
