= Datang station =

Datang station may refer to:

- Datang station (Changsha Metro) (大塘站), a metro station in Yuhua District, Changsha, Hunan, China.
- Datang station (Guangzhou Metro) (大塘站), a metro station in Haizhu District, Guangzhou, Guangdong, China.
