= Zhuji =

Zhuji 诸暨市 Chuki
- County-level city
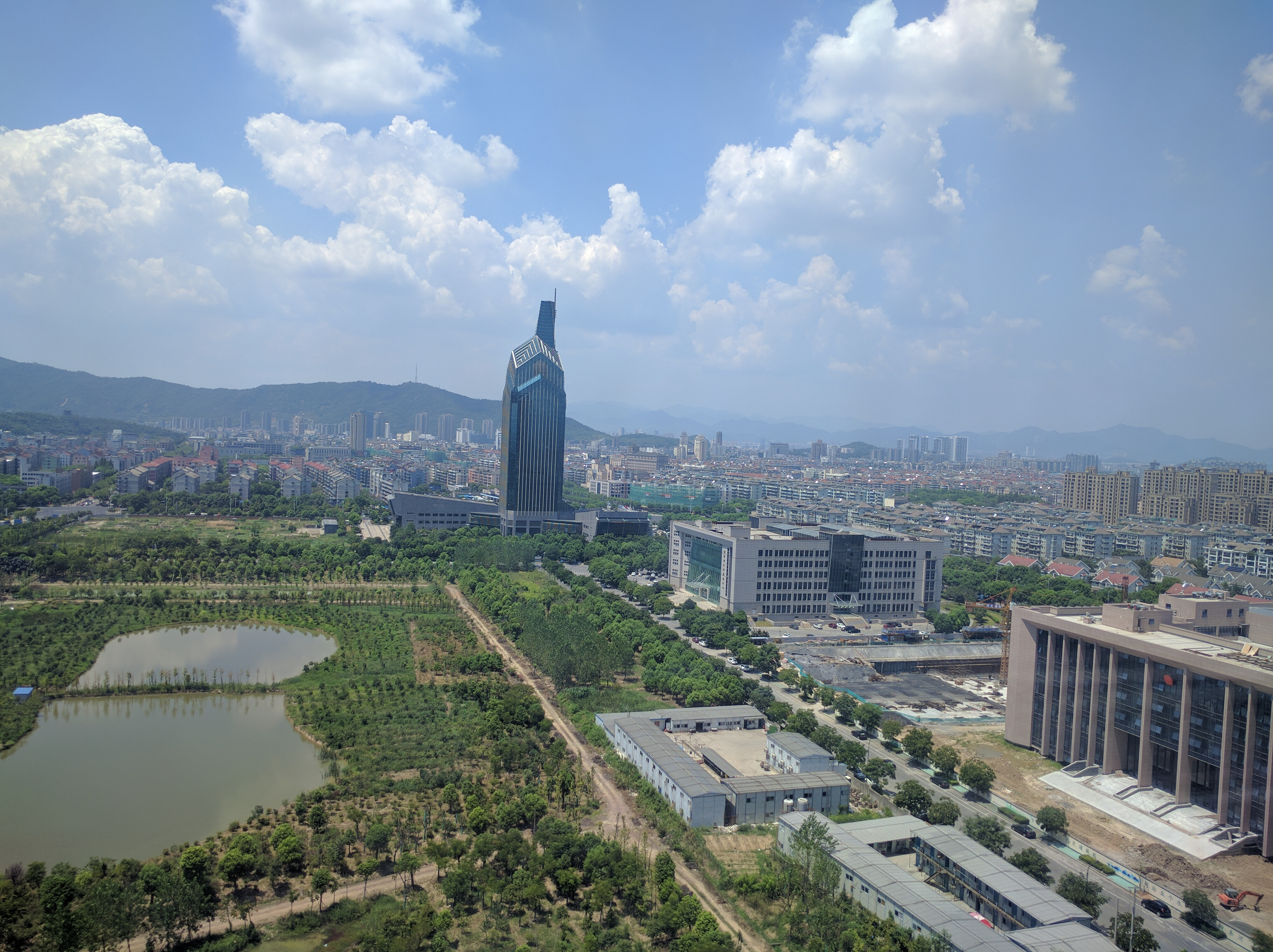

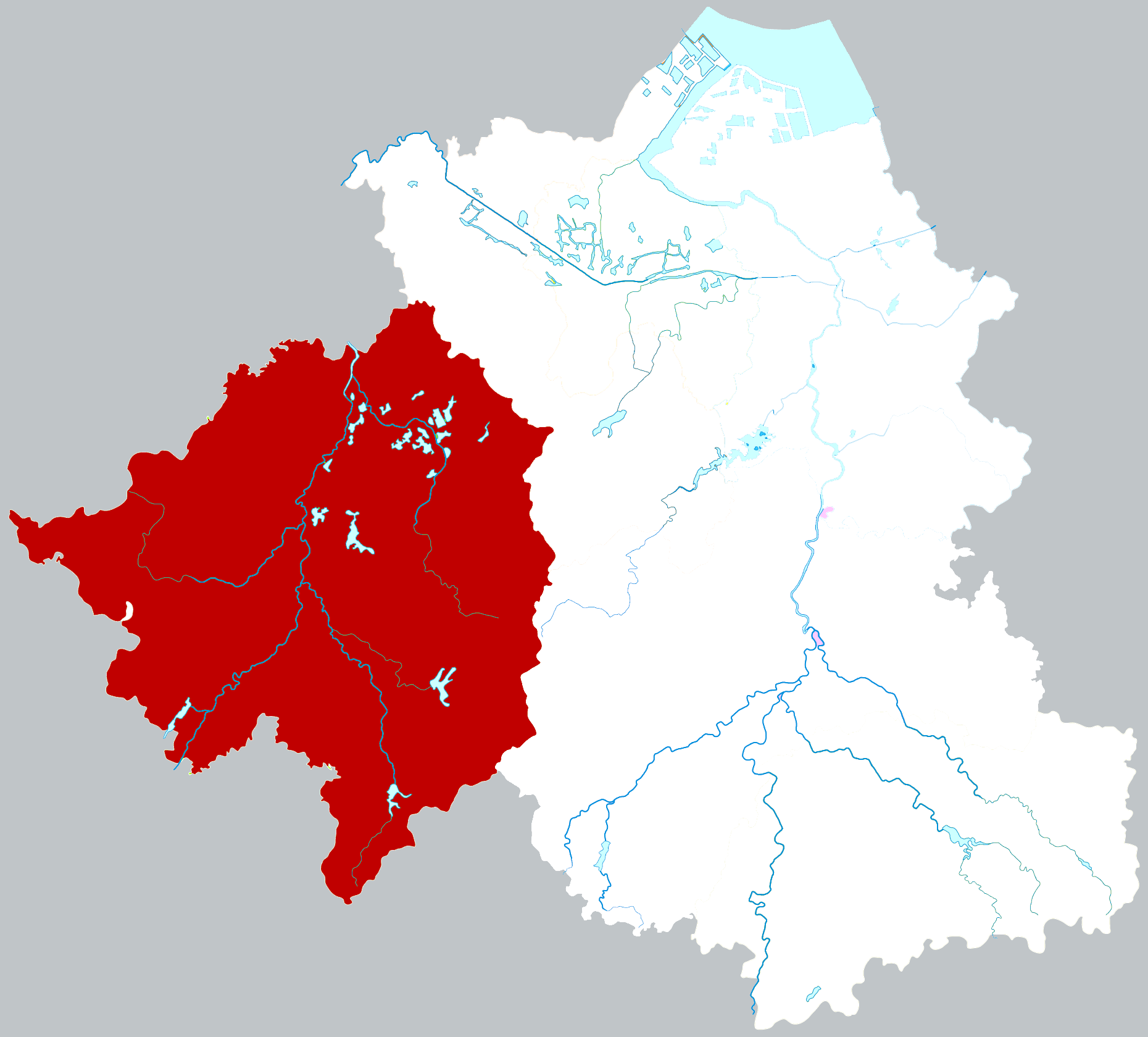
- Location of Zhuji City within Shaoxing

- Location in Zhejiang Zhuji (China)
- Country: People's Republic of China
- Province: Zhejiang
- Prefecture-level city: Shaoxing

Area
  - County-level city: 2,311.41 km^{2} (892.44 sq mi)
  - Urban: 2,311.41 km^{2} (892.44 sq mi)
  - Metro: 2,311.41 km^{2} (892.44 sq mi)

Population (2020 census)
  - County-level city: 1,218,072
  - Density: 526.982/km^{2} (1,364.88/sq mi)
  - Urban: 1,218,072
  - Urban density: 526.982/km^{2} (1,364.88/sq mi)
  - Metro: 1,218,072
  - Metro density: 526.982/km^{2} (1,364.88/sq mi)
- Time zone: UTC+8 (China Standard)

Zhuji (simplified Chinese: 诸暨; traditional Chinese: 諸暨; pinyin: Zhūjì) is a county-level city under the administration of the prefecture-level city of Shaoxing, in north-central Zhejiang province, China, located about 64 kilometres (40 mi) south of Hangzhou. It has 2,311 km^{2} (892 sq mi) with a population of 1,218,072 inhabitants at the 2020 census even though the built-up (or metro) area is much smaller.

== History ==
The region around Zhuji has been settled since Neolithic times and was the origin of the Wuyue culture. During the Spring and Autumn period, it was the birthplace of the legendary beauty Xi Shi. After the state of Yue was absorbed into the unification of China, Qin Shi Huang formally codified the boundaries of Zhuji as a county in 222 BC. This status remained intact until 1989, when the State Council reclassified Zhuji as a city.

== Administrative divisions ==
Subdistricts:

- Jiyang Subdistrict (暨阳街道), Huandong Subdistrict (浣东街道), Taozhu Subdistrict (陶朱街道)

Towns:

- Datang (大唐镇), Ciwu (次坞镇), Diankou (店口镇), Ruanshi (阮市镇), Jiangzao (江藻镇), Fengqiao (枫桥镇), Zhaojia (赵家镇), Majian (马剑镇), Caota (草塔镇), Paitou (牌头镇), Tongshan (同山镇), Anhua (安华镇), Jieting (街亭镇), Huangshan (璜山镇), Lipu (浬浦镇), Zhibu (直埠镇), Wuxie (五泄镇), Lingbei (岭北镇), Chenzhai (陈宅镇), Wangjiajing (王家井镇), Yingdianjie (应店街镇), Shanxiahu (山下湖镇), Dongbaihu (东白湖镇)

The only township is Donghe Township (东和乡)

== Transport ==
=== China Railway ===
Zhuji is served by Zhuji railway station.

=== Hangzhou to Zhuji ===
Hangzhou–Zhuji intercity railway is currently under planning. It will be connect to Line 18 of Hangzhou Metro.

Stations

Station Name		Connections	Length	Location
English	Chinese	Connections	Length	Location
Yiqiao	义桥	Hangzhou Metro: 18 (Planned)		Hangzhou
Yunlin Road	云临路			Hangzhou
Linpu	临浦			Hangzhou
Taohuayuan Resort	桃花源度假区			Hangzhou
Puyang	浦阳			Hangzhou
Shifanqu	示范区			Zhuji, Shaoxing
Diankou	店口	Shaoxing Metro: S2 (Planned)		Zhuji, Shaoxing
Yaojiang	姚江			Zhuji, Shaoxing
Shaoxing A&F University	农林大学			Zhuji, Shaoxing
Jidong Road	暨东路			Zhuji, Shaoxing
Shangmaocheng	商贸城			Zhuji, Shaoxing
Wangjiajing	王家井			Zhuji, Shaoxing

=== Shaoxing to Zhuji ===
Line S2 of Shaoxing Rail Transit (Shaoxing–Zhuji) is also under planning.

== Climate ==
Climate data for Zhuji, elevation 39 m (128 ft), (1991–2020 normals, extremes 1977–present)
Month	Jan	Feb	Mar	Apr	May	Jun	Jul	Aug	Sep	Oct	Nov	Dec	Year
Record high °C (°F)	24.6 (76.3)	28.5 (83.3)	34.4 (93.9)	34.2 (93.6)	36.1 (97.0)	38.5 (101.3)	40.8 (105.4)	42.5 (108.5)	40.1 (104.2)	34.2 (93.6)	31.4 (88.5)	25.2 (77.4)	42.5 (108.5)
Mean daily maximum °C (°F)	9.1 (48.4)	11.8 (53.2)	16.4 (61.5)	22.7 (72.9)	27.3 (81.1)	29.4 (84.9)	34.2 (93.6)	33.5 (92.3)	28.8 (83.8)	23.8 (74.8)	18.2 (64.8)	11.8 (53.2)	22.3 (72.0)
Daily mean °C (°F)	4.9 (40.8)	7.1 (44.8)	11.3 (52.3)	17.2 (63.0)	22.1 (71.8)	25.1 (77.2)	29.3 (84.7)	28.6 (83.5)	24.3 (75.7)	18.8 (65.8)	13.0 (55.4)	7.0 (44.6)	17.4 (63.3)
Mean daily minimum °C (°F)	1.9 (35.4)	3.7 (38.7)	7.5 (45.5)	12.9 (55.2)	18.0 (64.4)	21.8 (71.2)	25.5 (77.9)	25.1 (77.2)	20.9 (69.6)	14.9 (58.8)	9.2 (48.6)	3.5 (38.3)	13.7 (56.7)
Record low °C (°F)	−13.4 (7.9)	−5.6 (21.9)	−3.4 (25.9)	0.4 (32.7)	8.8 (47.8)	12.5 (54.5)	18.0 (64.4)	18.0 (64.4)	11.2 (52.2)	2.0 (35.6)	−3.3 (26.1)	−13.2 (8.2)	−13.4 (7.9)
Average precipitation mm (inches)	87.3 (3.44)	86.5 (3.41)	138.7 (5.46)	135.5 (5.33)	138.3 (5.44)	240.8 (9.48)	141.5 (5.57)	154.5 (6.08)	104.5 (4.11)	59.7 (2.35)	74.7 (2.94)	65.2 (2.57)	1,427.2 (56.18)
Average precipitation days (≥ 0.1 mm)	13.3	12.8	16.0	14.9	14.2	17.2	11.8	14.3	11.7	8.5	11.1	10.3	156.1
Average snowy days	3.8	2.5	0.8	0	0	0	0	0	0	0	0.1	1.6	8.8
Average relative humidity (%)	79	78	76	74	75	82	75	76	79	78	79	77	77
Mean monthly sunshine hours	97.4	99.8	121.2	145.3	160.0	129.2	225.6	204.3	154.2	149.7	118.5	115.4	1,720.6
Percentage possible sunshine	30	32	32	37	38	31	53	50	42	43	37	36	38
Source: China Meteorological Administration all-time extreme temperatures

== Economy ==
Zhuji is located in the Yangtze River Delta Economic Zone. Although there is not much arable land per capita, relying on the rich water resources of the Puyang River, it has developed agriculture well since ancient time. During the period of the Republic of China, many people in Zhuji, like other Zhejiang people in the surrounding areas, left their hometowns to develop in Shanghai, and operated small workshops, small factories, and textile and nanny jobs. After the reform and opening up, we vigorously developed townships, home-based industries, and made considerable achievements in textile and hardware manufacturing. At the same time, the two natural and cultural hotspots of Xi Shi and Wu Xie are used to develop the tourism industry. Its modern civic strengths include an excellent educational system and robust economic development, especially in the production of pearls, socks and embroidery machinery Datang. Due to its pearl production, the city has become known as "The Pearl City". Apart from Pearl, it also has many other local specialties: The textile industry is well developed. It has the largest hosiery industry in the country. Small hardware industry. Spring, small and medium-sized bearings. Rich in freshwater pearls, it has the largest pearl trading market in China and is known as the hometown of pearls. Citron is also a local specialty tea.

== Gallery ==
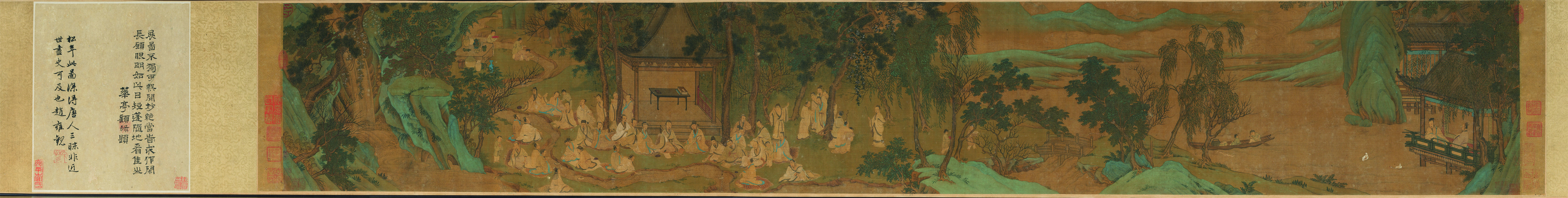
Purification Festival at the Orchid Pavilion, depicting a famed gathering at Wang Xizhi's estate in Zhuji, Zhejiang Province
