= Datang, Sichuan =

Datang Datangpu
- Town

Chinese transcription(s)
  - Simplified: 大塘
  - Pinyin: Dàtáng
- Location within China
- Coordinates: 30°17′39.45″N 103°22′6.96″E
- Country: China
- Province: Sichuan
- Prefecture: Chengdu
- County: Pujiang
- Time zone: UTC+8 (China Standard)
- Postal code: 611637
- Area code: 28

Datang (Chinese: 大塘; pinyin: Dàtáng), also known as Datangpu (Chinese: 大塘铺), is a town in Pujiang County, Chengdu, Sichuan. It has good transport links and major routes between Datang, Chengdu and Chengdu Shuangliu International Airport and it is situated in one of the most environmentally friendly and pollution-free areas of Chengdu. Hongfu Village is the head village and a major tourist attraction of Datang Town. The town economically relies on the exportation and trade of rice.
