= Footwrap =

Cloth wrapped around the feet instead of socks

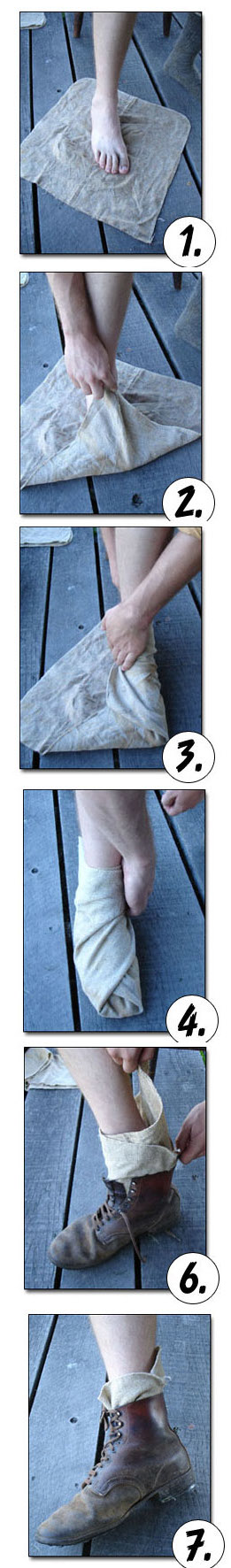
One method of putting on footwraps

Footwraps (German: Fußlappen, Russian: Портянки, romanized: portyanki, lit. 'footwraps', also referred to as foot cloths, rags, bandages or bindings) are rectangular pieces of cloth that are worn wrapped around the feet to reduce chafing from other footwear, absorb sweat and improve the foothold. Footwraps were worn with boots before socks became widely available, and remained in use by soldiers in some Eastern European armies until the start of the 21st century.

== Description ==
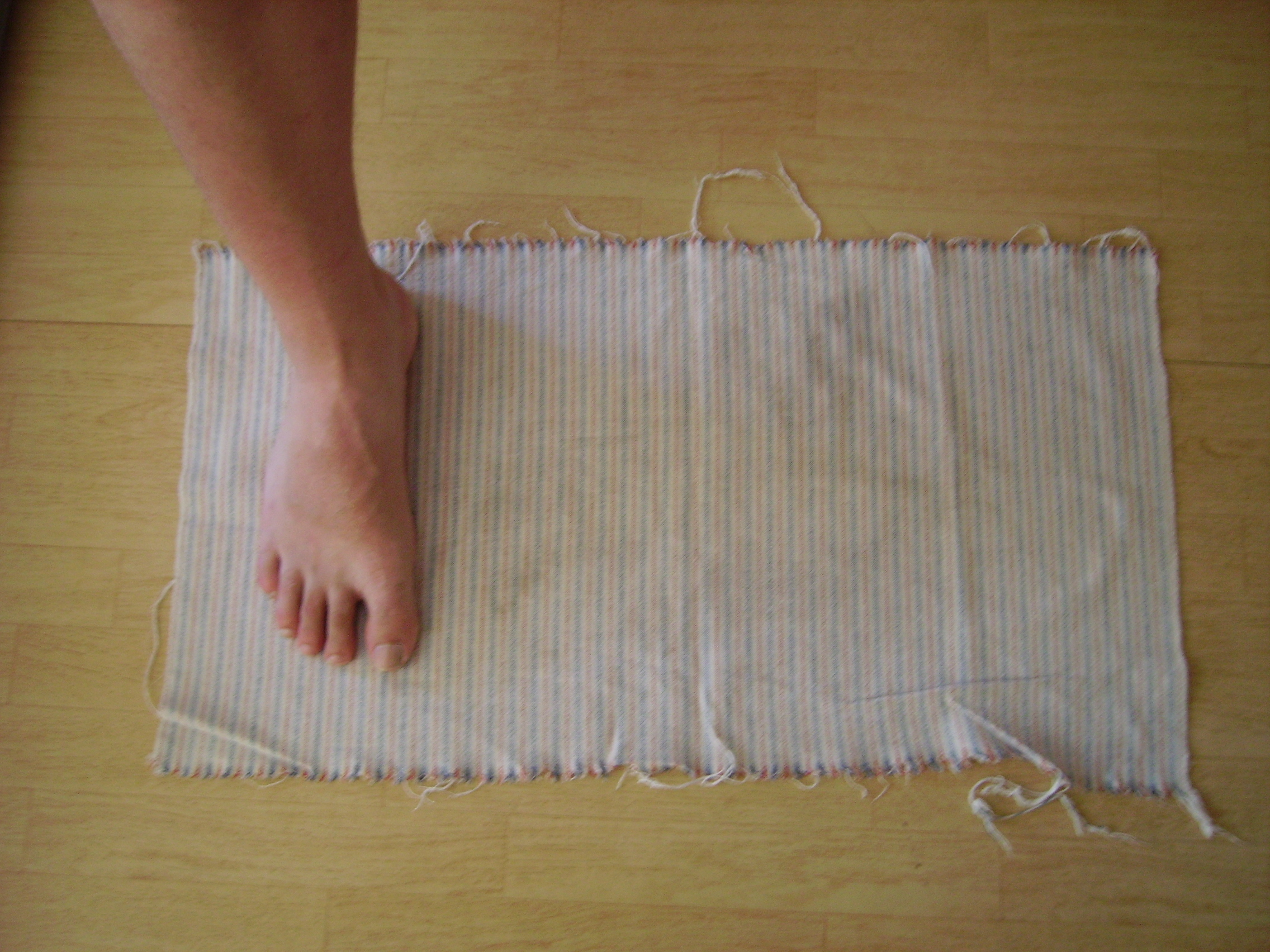
Footwraps of this style were issued to Finnish Army soldiers until the 1990s.

Footwraps are typically square, rectangular or less often triangular. They measure about 16 inches (40 cm) on each side if square or ~30 in (75 cm) if triangular. Those manufactured from thinner fabrics may be folded to produce a square, rectangular or triangular shape suitable for wearing. The footwraps issued by the Russian Ground Forces for use in winter were made of flannel while those for summer use were made of cotton.

Apart from being cheaper and simpler to make or improvise, footwraps are also quicker to dry than socks and are more resistant to wear and tear: any holes can be compensated for by re-wrapping the cloth in a different position. Their principal drawback is that any folds in the wraps, which easily occur during marching unless the wraps are very carefully applied to the feet, can quickly cause blisters or wounds. Consequently, armies issued detailed instructions for how to put on footwraps correctly.

Footwraps are notorious for the foul smell that they develop when worn under military conditions, where soldiers are often unable to change or dry them for days. Russian veterans used to jokingly pride themselves about the stench of their footwear, referring to their footwraps as "chemical weapons" that would defeat any enemy unaccustomed to the smell.

== Military use ==
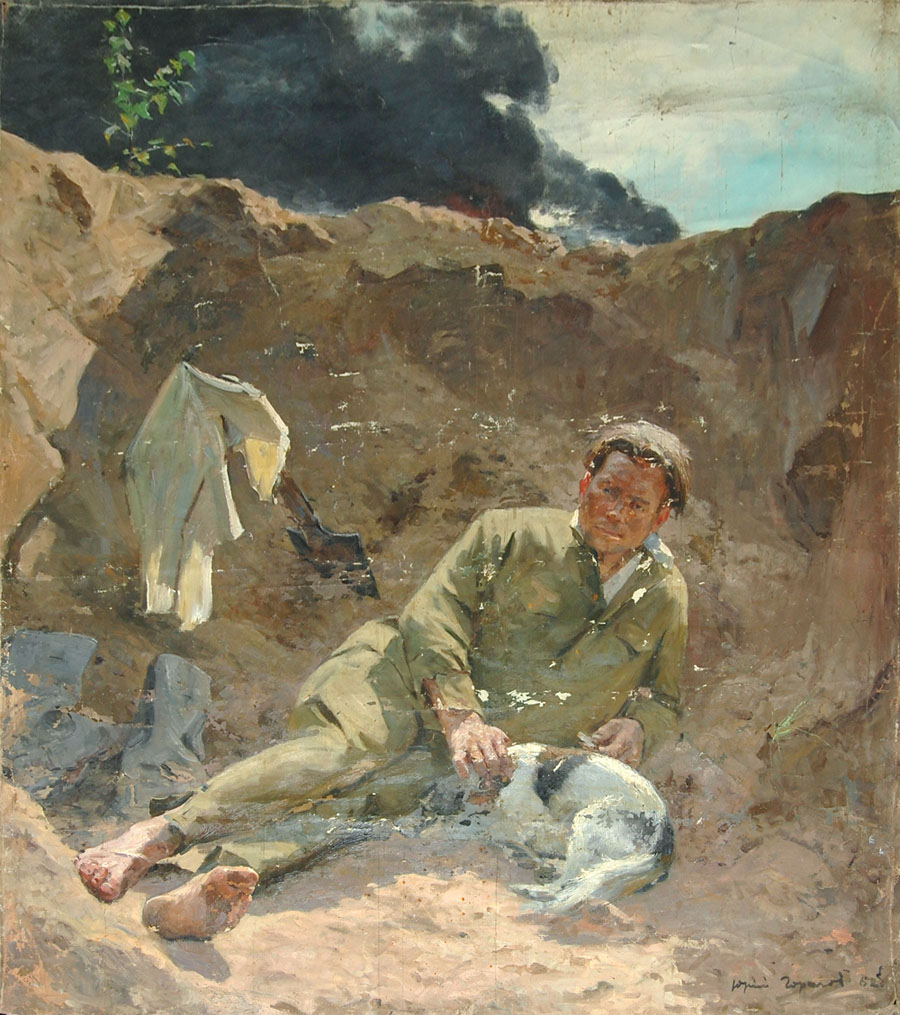
A Soviet soldier drying his footwraps. 1962 painting by Y. G. Gorelov.

Footwraps were issued by armies and worn by soldiers throughout history, often long after civilians had replaced them with socks. Prior to the 20th century, socks or stockings were often luxury items affordable only by officers, while the rank and file serving under them continued to use wraps.

=== Germany ===
Prussian soldiers wore Fußlappen (German for 'foot cloths'). A 1869 Manual of Military Hygiene advised: "Footwraps are appropriate in summer, but they must have no seams and be very carefully put on; clean and soft socks are better." An 1867 book of German proverbs records the following:

One's own footwrap is better than someone else's boot.

— German proverb, Deutsches Sprichwörter-Lexikon: Ein Hausschatz für das deutsche Volk (German for 'Lexicon of German Proverbs: A Treasure for the German People')

The German Wehrmacht used footwraps until the end of World War II, and they continued to be worn in the East German National People's Army until 1968.

=== Eastern Europe ===
The Russian and later Soviet armed forces issued footwraps since Peter the Great established the regular Imperial Russian Army in 1721. Footwraps also remained standard issue in the armies of many post-Soviet states following the dissolution of the Soviet Union. The Belarusian, Ukrainian and Georgian armies eventually abandoned them in favor of socks in the 2000s. In each case, nostalgia about the traditional footwear ran high among soldiers. The Ukrainian army held a special farewell ceremony for its footwraps, with soldiers even reciting poems and fables about them.

In the Russian Ground Forces, footwraps remained in use for tasks requiring the wear of heavy boots until 2013, because they were considered to offer a better fit with standard-issue boots. They were issued again during the 2022 Russian mobilization.

Because of their association with the Russian army, footwraps are called chaussettes russes (French for 'Russian socks') in French.

== See also ==
- Bast shoe, with which they can be worn
- Puttee
