= Puttee =

Covering for the lower leg

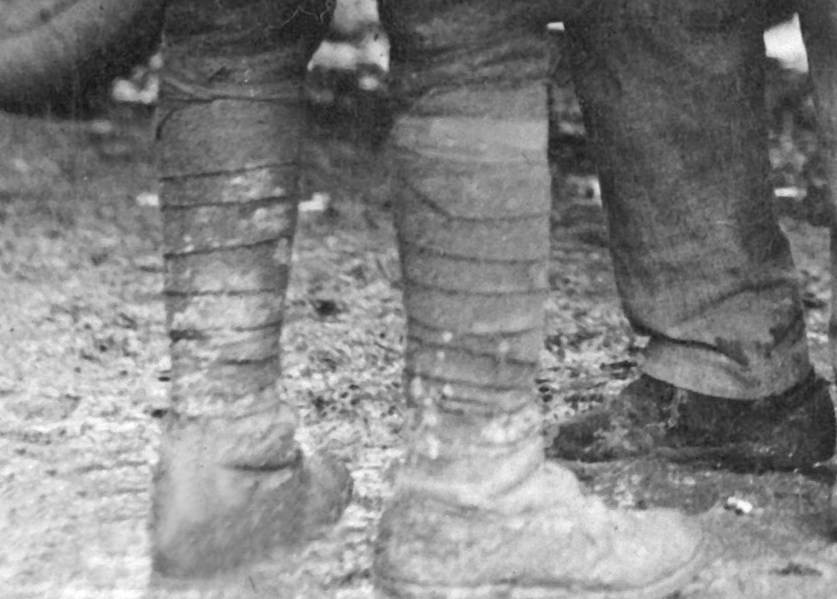
Close-up of a World War I era United States Army infantryman's puttees

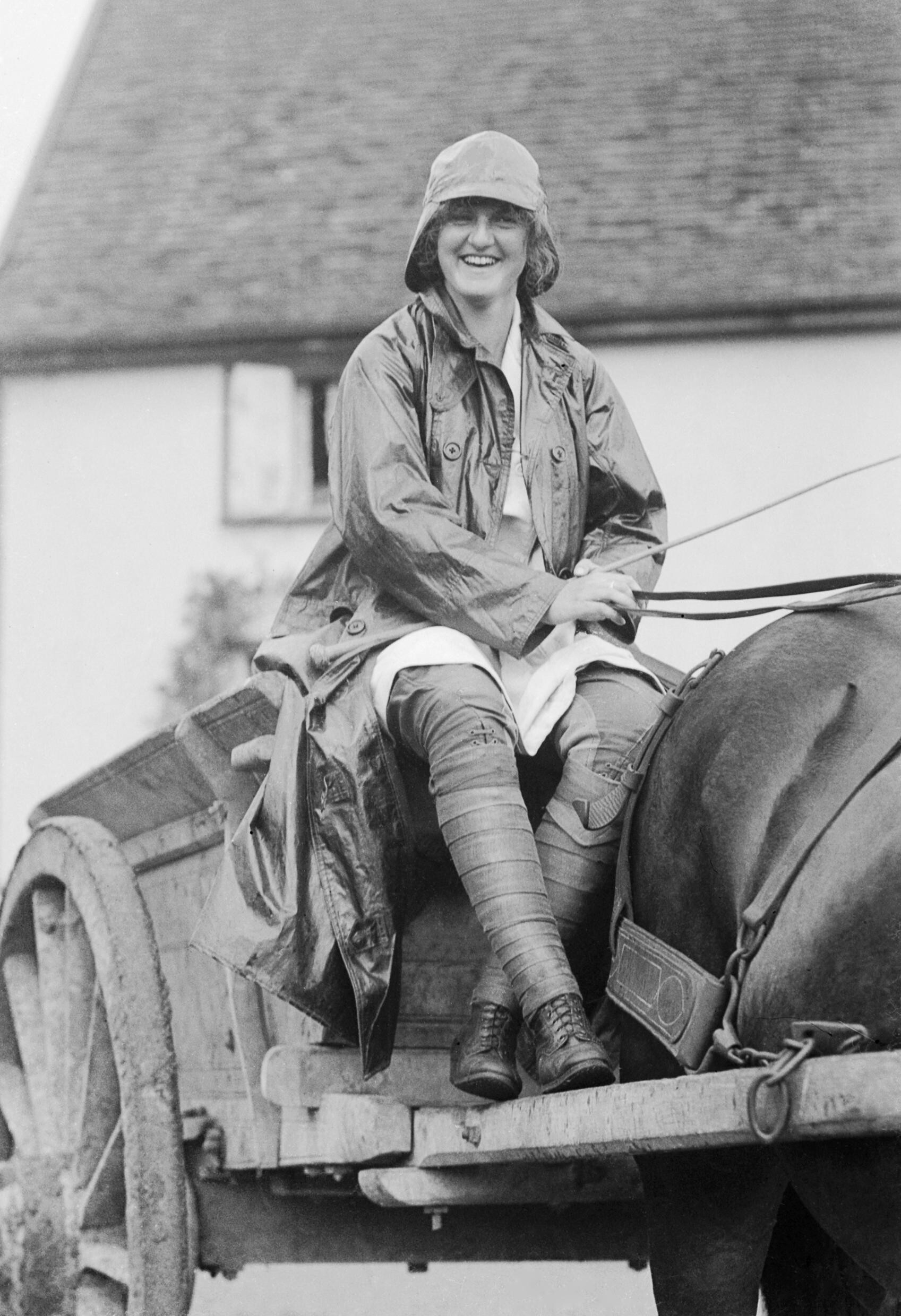
A member of the Women's Land Army wearing a waterproof coat, sou'wester and puttees

A puttee (also spelled puttie, adapted from the Hindi paṭṭī, meaning "bandage") is a covering for the lower part of the leg from the ankle to the knee, also known as: legwraps, leg bindings, winingas and Wickelbänder, etc. They consist of a long narrow piece of cloth wound tightly, and spirally round the leg, and serving to provide both support (as a compression garment) and protection. They were worn by both mounted and dismounted soldiers, generally taking the place of the leather or cloth gaiter.

== History ==
Worn since antiquity, the puttee was adopted as part of the service uniform of foot and mounted soldiers serving in British India during the second half of the nineteenth century. In its original form the puttee comprised long strips of cloth worn as a tribal legging in the Himalayas. The British Indian Army found this garment to be both comfortable and inexpensive, although it was considered to lack the smartness of the gaiter previously worn. According to the British author and soldier Patrick Leigh Fermor, infantry puttees were wound up from ankle to knee, but in cavalry regiments they were wound down from knee to ankle.

The puttee was subsequently widely adopted by a number of armies including those of the British Commonwealth, the Austro-Hungarian Army, the Chinese National Revolutionary Army, the Belgian Army, the Ethiopian Army, the Dutch Army, the Imperial German Army (when stocks of leather long marching boots ran short during WWI), the French Army, the Imperial Japanese Army, the Italian Army, the Portuguese Army, the Ottoman Army and the United States Army. Most of these armies adopted puttees during or shortly before World War I. Puttees were in general use by the British Army as part of the khaki service uniform worn from 1902, until 1938 when a new battledress was introduced, which included short webbing gaiters secured with buckles. One of the largest providers of the puttee during World War I to the British Army was Fox Brothers, produced at Tonedale Mill, Somerset.

Puttees generally ceased to be worn as part of military uniform during World War II. Reasons included the difficulty of quickly donning an item of dress that had to be wound carefully around each leg, plus medical reservations regarding hygiene and varicose veins. However the cheapness and easy availability of cloth leggings meant that they were retained in the Italian, French, Japanese and some other armies until various dates between 1941 and 1945. The Red Army typically used them with laced ankle boots where the legs were insufficiently protected, though jackboots were more common.

When the British Army finally replaced battledress with the 1960 Pattern Combat Dress, ankle high puttees replaced the webbing gaiters. These continued to be worn until the 1980s.

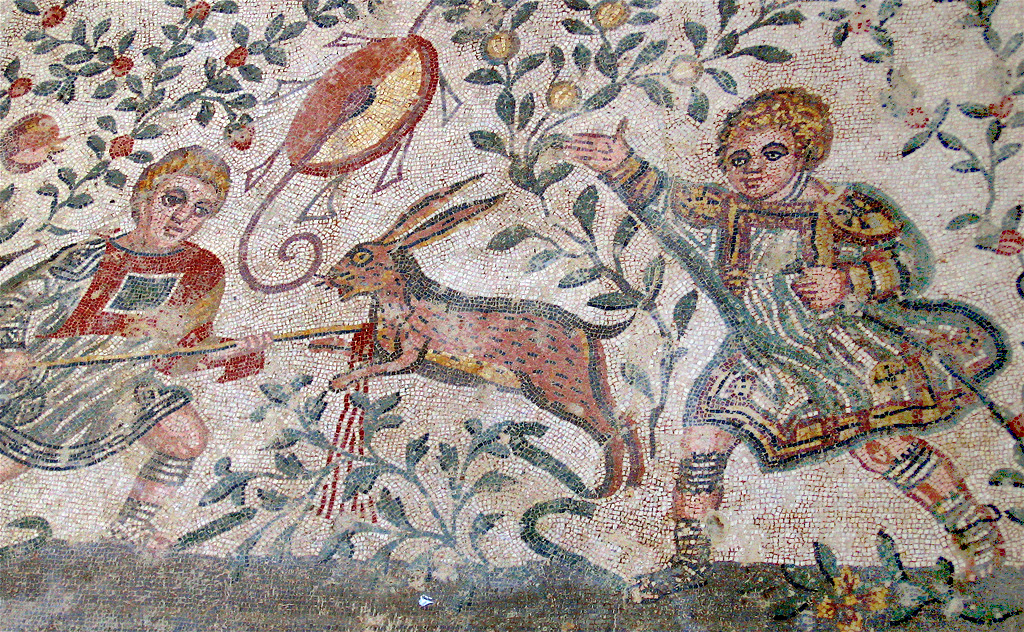
Roman fasciae crurales, depicted in a 4th-century CE hunting scene

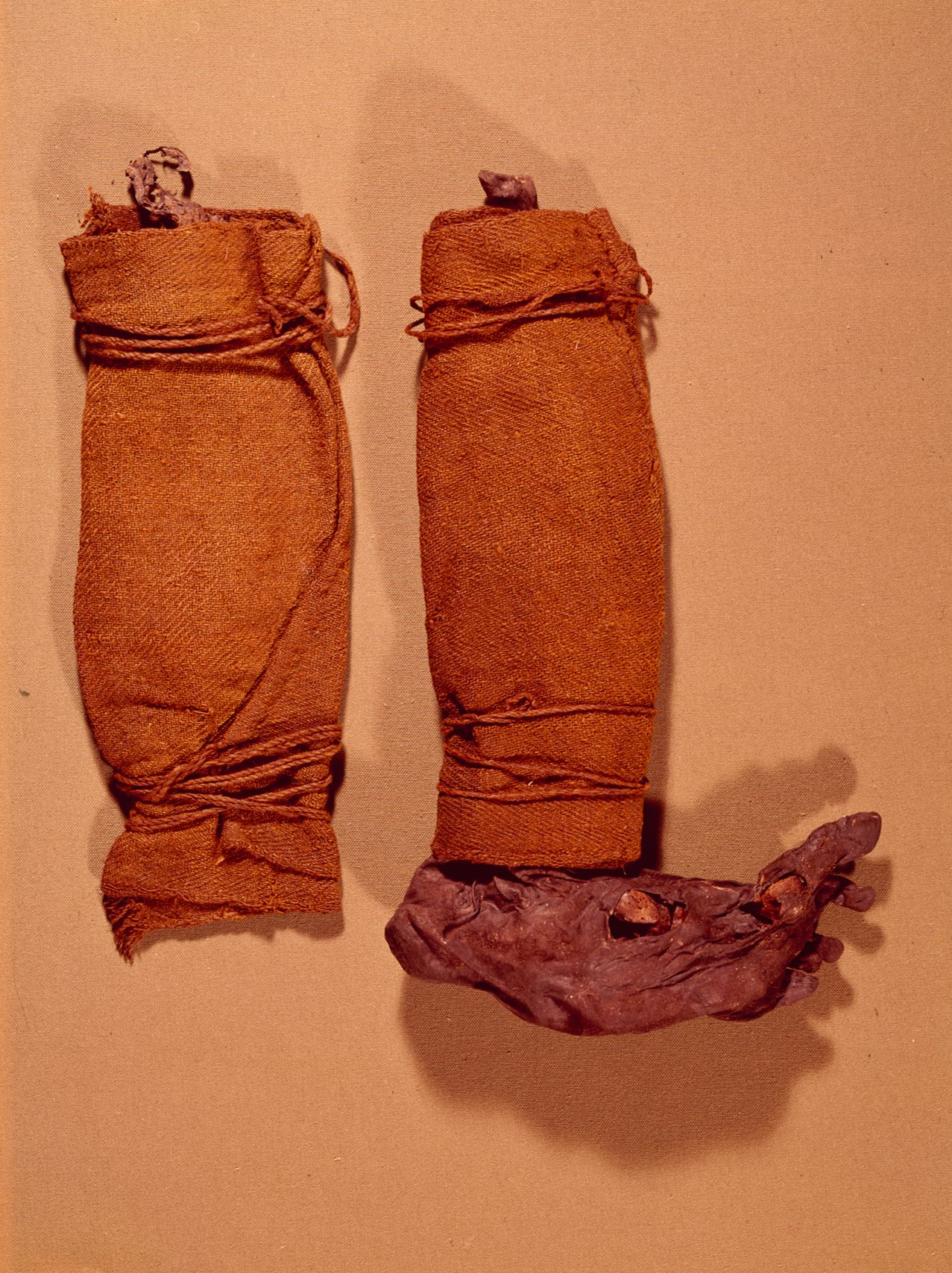
Puttees of bog boy Søgårds Mose Man, Denmark, early Iron Age

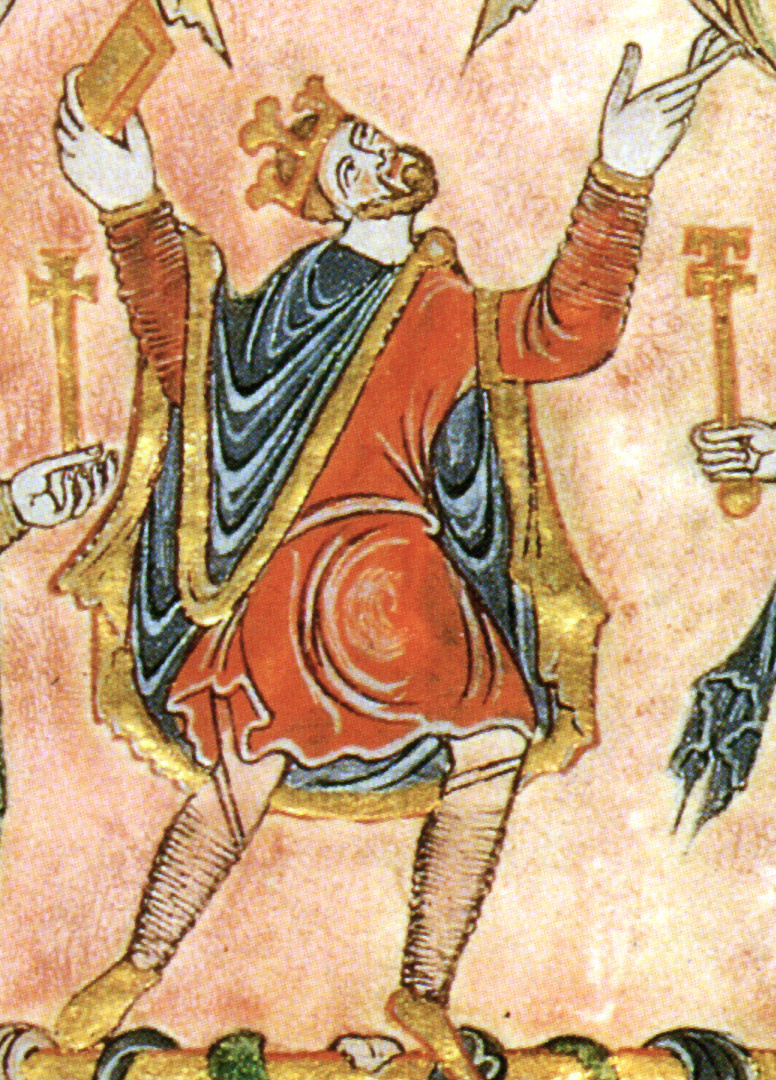
King Edgar of England, 966 CE

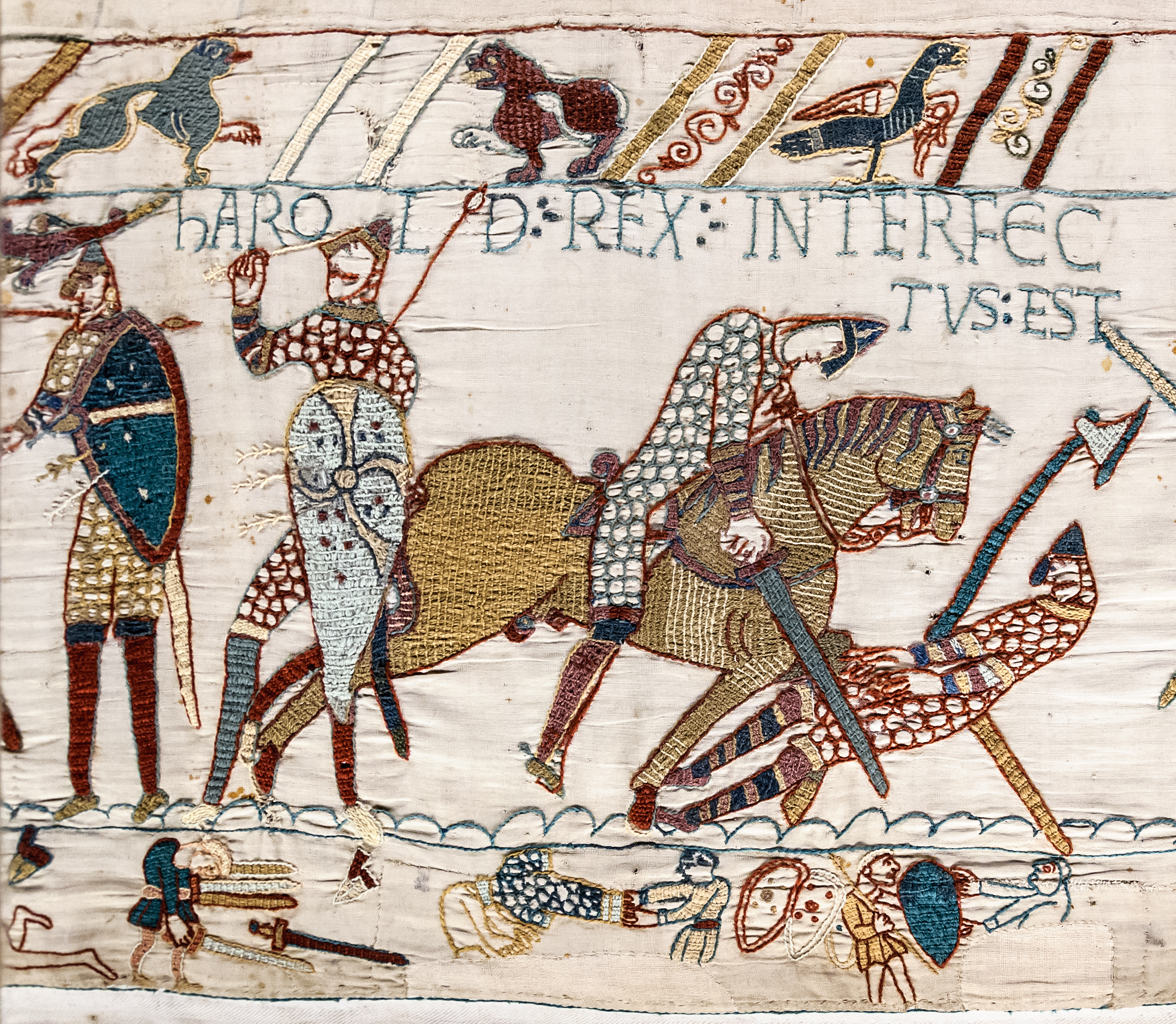
Battle of Hastings, 1066 CE

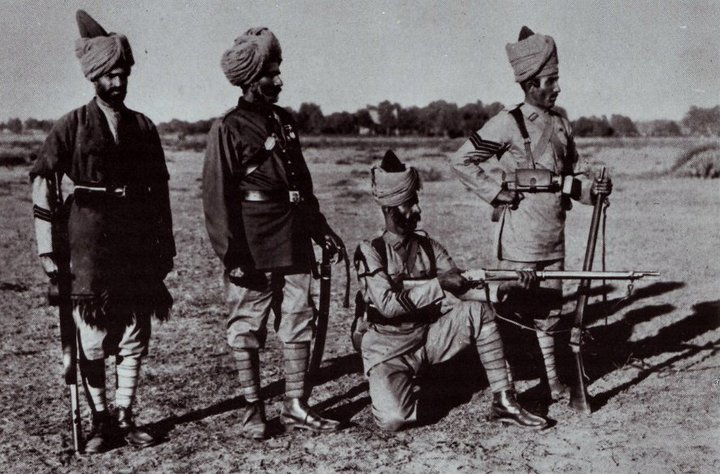
Soldiers of the Queen's Own Corps of Guides of the British Indian Army in 1897. They are in various orders of uniform but all wear puttees.

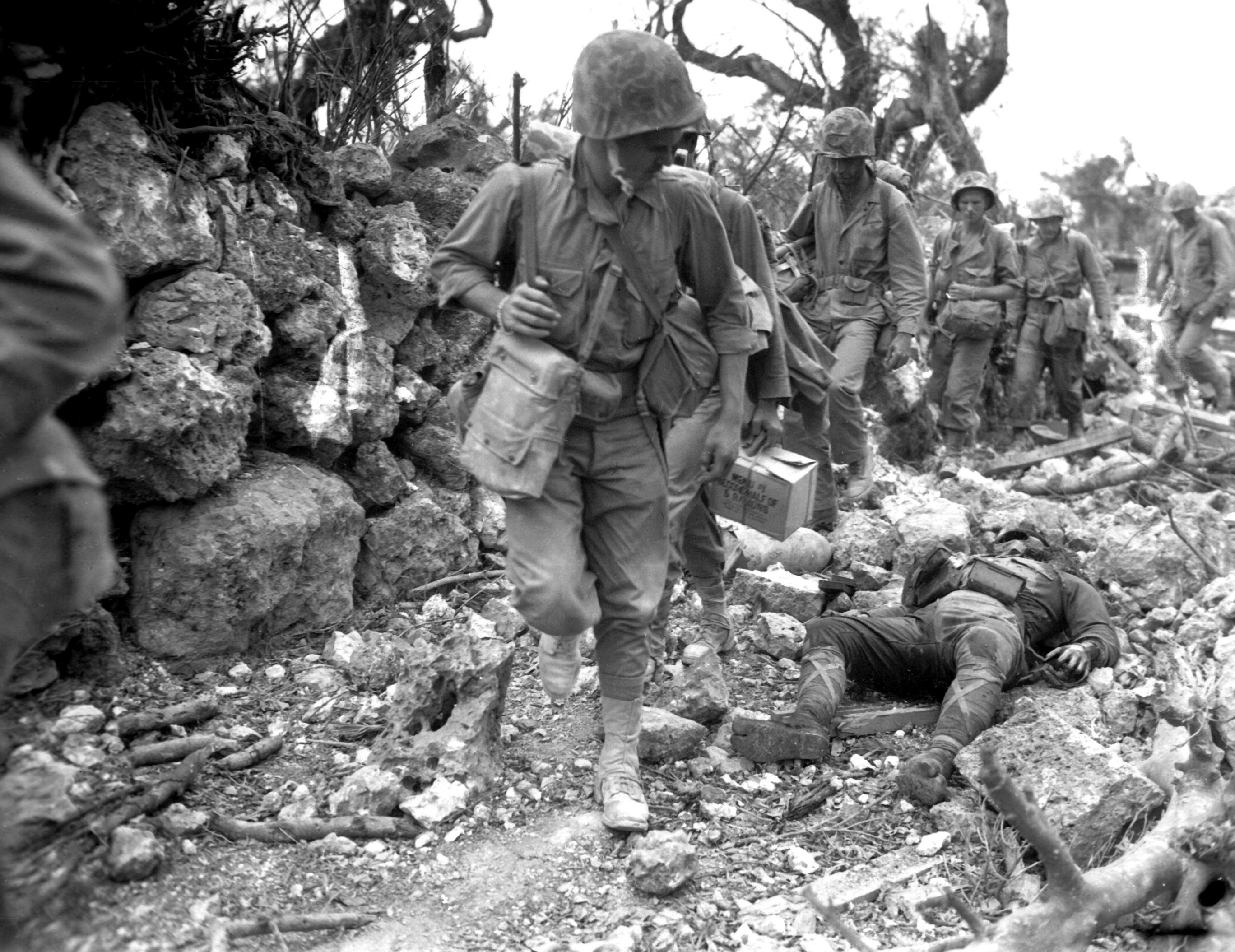
Puttees on a dead Japanese soldier in Okinawa, April 1945

In 2013, the remains of two teenaged Austrian First World War soldiers were found on the Presena glacier. One of them carried a spoon tucked into his puttees.

== Legacy ==
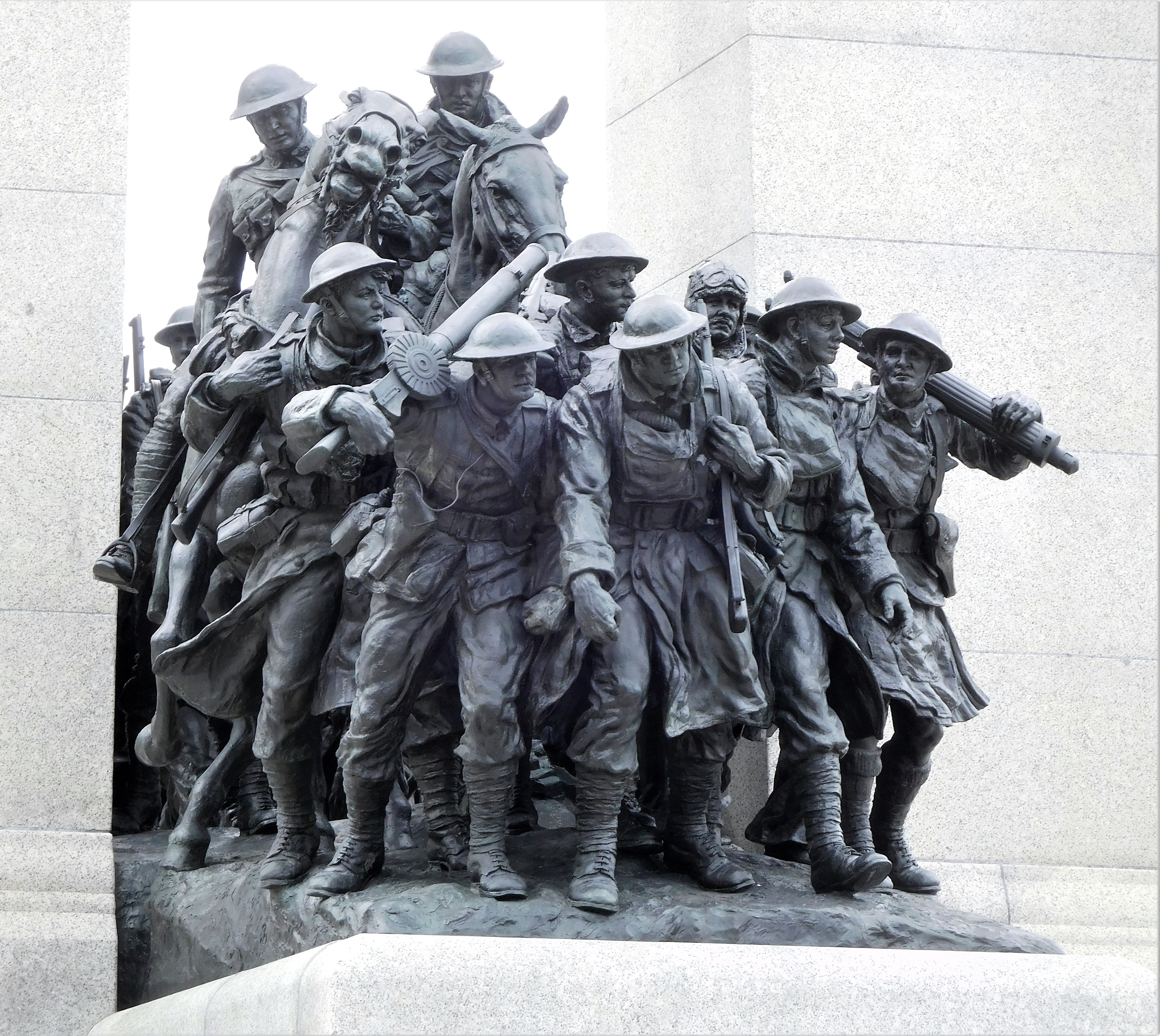
The National War Memorial in Ottawa depicts Canadian Army infantrymen from World War I wearing puttees

Two current Canadian infantry regiments were given nicknames based on non-standard blue (not khaki) leg wear: the Royal Newfoundland Regiment and the 48th Highlanders of Canada (known as "The Glamour Boys").

At the outbreak of World War I the Dominion of Newfoundland raised a regiment for active service. Lacking a local militia or garrison of soldiers, there were no military stores; uniforms had to be fashioned from scratch. In the absence of khaki broadcloth, puttees were fashioned from blue broadcloth. The Newfoundland Regiment was thus nicknamed "The Blue Puttees". This distinctive feature was retained for several months until the regiment was issued with standard British Army uniform and equipment upon arrival in England.

During World War II, 1 Brigade of the 1st Canadian Division was being inspected by King George VI. By this date the traditional knee-length puttees had been replaced with short ankle-length leggings worn with battledress. There were not enough khaki leggings for issue, so the 48th Highlanders made do with unofficial blue ones reportedly cut down from stocks of blue cloth found in regimental stores. The King inquired as to why the 48th wore different "puttees" from the rest of the brigade. Upon being told of the shortage, the king replied that he liked the blue puttees better and that they should keep them. The 48th Highlanders continued to wear blue puttees until the regimental battle dress was eventually phased out.

== See also ==
- Footwraps – Cloth wrapped around the feet instead of socks
- Gaiters – Garment worn over the shoe and lower pants leg
- Leggings – Several types of leg coverings

== Notes ==
- This article incorporates text from a publication now in the public domain: Chisholm, Hugh, ed. (1911). "Puttee". Encyclopædia Britannica (11th ed.). Cambridge University Press.
