= Datang, Zhuji =

City in Zhuji, Zhejiang, China

Coordinates: 29°41′35″N 120°10′01″E

Datang (Chinese: 大唐; pinyin: Dàtáng) is a town in Zhuji, Zhejiang Province, China.

== Sock City ==
By the early 1980s, the township had a population of 1,000. Designated as an industrial development zone, it quickly developed as a hosiery industry centre, becoming known as Sock City. By 2008, the town was producing eight billion pairs of socks each year, a third of the world's sock production, effectively creating two pairs of socks for every person on the planet for the year 2011. As a result, the population boomed to 60,000, with over 100,000 employed in the area in the industry via other local towns and villages.
