= Pujiang County, Sichuan =

Pujiang County 蒲江县
- County
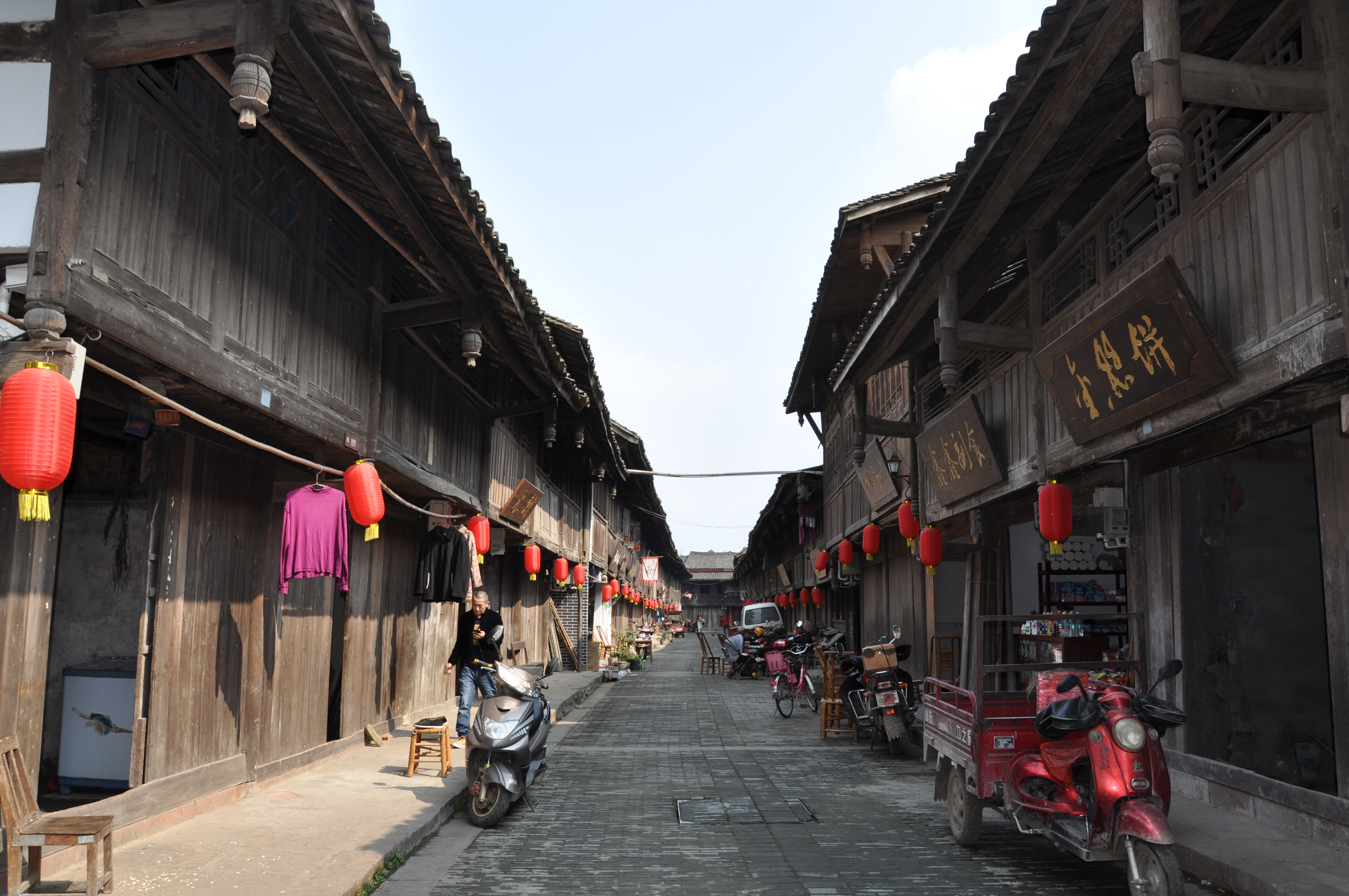

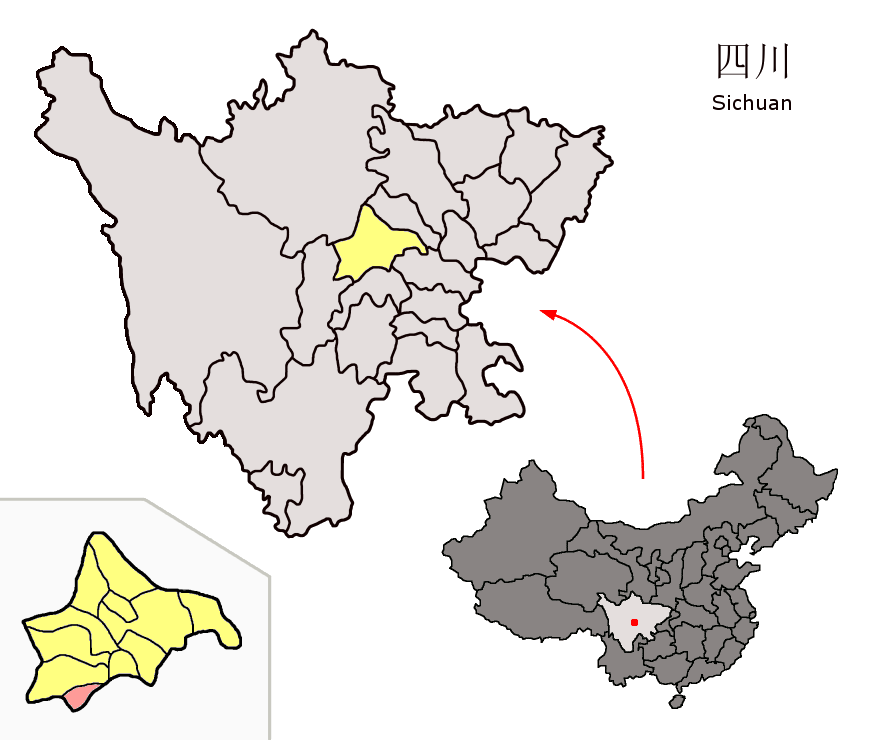
- Location of Pujiang in Sichuan

- Location in Sichuan
- Coordinates: 30°11′56″N 103°30′32″E
- Country: China
- Province: Sichuan
- Sub-provincial city: Chengdu
- County seat: Heshan Subdistrict

Area
  - Total: 580 km^{2} (220 sq mi)

Population (2020 census)
  - Total: 255,563
  - Density: 411/km^{2} (1,060/sq mi)
- Time zone: UTC+8 (China Standard)
- Postal code: 6116XX
- Website: pujiang.gov.cn

Pujiang County (simplified Chinese: 蒲江县; traditional Chinese: 蒲江縣; pinyin: Pújiāng Xiàn) is a county of Sichuan Province, China. It is under the administration of the prefecture-level city of Chengdu, the provincial capital.

== Administrative divisions ==
Pujiang County has jurisdiction over two streets and six towns. Pujiang County People's Government is located in Government Street No. 31, Heshan Subdistrict.

subdistrict

- Heshan Subdistrict (鹤山街道)
- Shouan Subdistrict (寿安街道)

Towns

- Datang town (大塘镇)
- Zhaoyanghu town (朝阳湖镇)
- Xilai town (西来镇)
- Daxing town (大兴镇)
- Ganxi town (甘溪镇)
- Chengjia town (成佳镇)

== Geography ==
Pujiang County is in the southwest part of the Sichuan Basin and in the area from east longitude 103°19′to 103°41′ and from north latitude 30°05′ to 30°20′. It borders Pengshan and Meishan in the east, Mingshan in the west, Danlin (Danleng County) in the south, and Qionglai City in the north, stretching 37 kilometers from east to west and 27.5 kilometers from north to south.

== History ==
In the 4th century BC the Qin Kingdom annexed the Shu Kingdom and established Puyang county in the Pushui area. In the Han dynasty, Puyang county was eliminated and affiliated with Linyi county. In 554 AD, it was built as Guangding county and in 601 AD the name was changed to Pujiang. The county was originally located in Lixudi in the north and during the Hongwu Emperor reign, the emperor moved the county to what is now Heshan town under the jurisdiction of Qiongzhou, and later under Meishan, then Wenjiang. In 1983 it was put under the administration of the city of Chengdu.

== Industrial area ==
The urban district, Pujiang Centralized Area for Industrial Development, is near to Chendu-Ya'an Highway, 68 kilometers from Chengdu. The area is the only processing center for agriculture by-products at the state level in Chengdu. The size is approximately 6 square kilometers and the shorter-term development area is 5.4 square kilometers. Its emphasis is on developing food drinking biology, medicine, light industry, manufacturing, and other high technology ventures.

== Climate ==
Climate data for Pujiang, elevation 578 m (1,896 ft), (1991–2020 normals, extremes 1981–present)
Month	Jan	Feb	Mar	Apr	May	Jun	Jul	Aug	Sep	Oct	Nov	Dec	Year
Record high °C (°F)	20.4 (68.7)	24.2 (75.6)	32.9 (91.2)	32.9 (91.2)	35.1 (95.2)	37.8 (100.0)	38.4 (101.1)	39.5 (103.1)	36.1 (97.0)	30.3 (86.5)	26.6 (79.9)	18.8 (65.8)	39.5 (103.1)
Mean daily maximum °C (°F)	9.6 (49.3)	12.4 (54.3)	17.3 (63.1)	23.0 (73.4)	26.7 (80.1)	28.9 (84.0)	30.6 (87.1)	30.4 (86.7)	25.9 (78.6)	20.9 (69.6)	16.4 (61.5)	11.0 (51.8)	21.1 (70.0)
Daily mean °C (°F)	6.0 (42.8)	8.3 (46.9)	12.3 (54.1)	17.3 (63.1)	21.0 (69.8)	23.7 (74.7)	25.5 (77.9)	25.1 (77.2)	21.5 (70.7)	17.2 (63.0)	12.7 (54.9)	7.5 (45.5)	16.5 (61.7)
Mean daily minimum °C (°F)	3.6 (38.5)	5.6 (42.1)	8.9 (48.0)	13.3 (55.9)	17.1 (62.8)	20.2 (68.4)	22.1 (71.8)	21.8 (71.2)	19.1 (66.4)	15.0 (59.0)	10.3 (50.5)	5.2 (41.4)	13.5 (56.3)
Record low °C (°F)	−4.5 (23.9)	−2.9 (26.8)	−0.6 (30.9)	4.5 (40.1)	7.8 (46.0)	14.2 (57.6)	16.0 (60.8)	15.7 (60.3)	12.3 (54.1)	4.5 (40.1)	−0.7 (30.7)	−4.5 (23.9)	−4.5 (23.9)
Average precipitation mm (inches)	14.5 (0.57)	21.9 (0.86)	38.8 (1.53)	71.5 (2.81)	106.5 (4.19)	133.6 (5.26)	258.5 (10.18)	289.3 (11.39)	146.6 (5.77)	72.0 (2.83)	28.4 (1.12)	15.8 (0.62)	1,197.4 (47.13)
Average precipitation days (≥ 0.1 mm)	10.3	10.6	13.1	14.3	15.3	16.8	16.8	16.6	17.1	17.1	10.9	9.4	168.3
Average snowy days	1.2	0.3	0	0	0	0	0	0	0	0	0	0.2	1.7
Average relative humidity (%)	85	83	81	79	77	81	84	85	86	87	86	86	83
Mean monthly sunshine hours	43.2	51.6	82.5	113.6	124.0	114.9	130.2	139.3	71.7	52.0	52.5	43.8	1,019.3
Percentage possible sunshine	13	16	22	29	29	27	31	34	20	15	17	14	22
Source: China Meteorological Administration all-time extreme temperature all-time January highall-time July high
