= PocketBell =

Philippine telecommunications company

- Industry: Telecommunications
- Services: Pager-related services
- Parent: Philippine Telegraph and Telephone Corporation

Philippine Wireless Inc., doing business as PocketBell, was a telecommunications company which was the first to introduce pagers in the Philippines.

== History ==
Philippine Wireless Inc. introduced PocketBell in the 1970s, becoming the first company to make pagers commercially available in the Philippines. From the 1970s until the mid-1980s, it virtually maintained a monopoly in the pager industry in the country. After the 1986 People Power Revolution which deposed President Ferdinand Marcos and installed Corazon Aquino as the new head of state, certain sectors of the Philippine economy was liberalized including telecommunications which allowed the entry of new companies in the pager industry. As much as 10 companies competed with Philippine Wireless at the peak of the pager industry in the country.

A shareholder dispute within Philippine Wireless in the 1990s, which ended with the Santiago family gaining control of the company, allowed PocketBell's competitors to break its monopoly. In the 1990s, PocketBell's main competitor was EasyCall. Another competing company called Digipage also entered the market in 1991. Philippine Wireless along with EasyCall claim that they own 50 percent of the market share in the Philippine pager industry.

The introduction of mobile phones with short message service (SMS) functionality in the late 1990s and the 1997 Asian financial crisis caused Philippine Wireless' to end its pager services. They planned to introduce two-way paging as a response to the introduction of SMS but failed to do so.
