= Internet in the Philippines =

Internet in the Philippines first became available on March 29, 1994, 10:18 a.m., with the Philippine Network Foundation (PHNet) connecting the country and its people to Sprint in the United States via a 64 kbit/s link. As of February 2023, there are 85.16 million internet users in the country, where internet penetration stood at 73.1% of the total population.

World map of internet penetration (number of Internet users as a percentage of a country's population), 2012

World map of internet users, 2012

== History ==
=== Timeline ===
The early history of the Internet in the Philippines started with the establishment of Bulletin Board Systems (BBS) by local computer hobbyists and enthusiasts. They were able to link their BBS's using a dial-up connection protocol enabling them to participate in discussion forums, send messages and share files.

1986: Establishment of first BBS in the Philippines, First-Fil RBBS a public-access BBS went online with an annual subscription fee of ₱1,000 (equivalent to ₱7,678 in 2021). A precursor to the local online forum, it ran an open-source BBS software on an IBM XT Clone PC with a 1200bit/s modem and was operated by Dan Angeles and Ed Castañeda.

1987: The Philippine FidoNet Exchange, a local network for communication between several BBSes in Metro Manila, was formed.

1990: A committee helmed by Arnie del Rosario of the Ateneo Computer Technology Center was tasked with exploring the possibility of creating an academic network of universities and government institutions by the National Computer Center under Dr. William Torres. Recommendations were made but not implemented.

1991–1993: Emergence of email gateways and services in the Philippines, including some from multinational companies like Intel, Motorola, and Texas Instruments, which used a direct Internet connection, X.25, or UUCP protocol. Local firms ETPI, Philcom, and PLDT (Philippine Long Distance Telephone Company) also operated commercial X.25 networks. Another milestone: Local and international email to FidoNet users was introduced.

June 1993: With the support of the Department of Science and Technology and the Industrial Research Foundation, the Philnet project (now PHNET) was born. The Philnet technical committee, composed of computer buffs working at the DOST [MIS (Joseph Andres), PCASTRD (Merl Opena, Winnefredo Aggabao) and Advanced Science and Technology Institute (Miguel Dimayuga)] and representatives from the Ateneo de Manila University (Richie Lozada and Arnie del Rosario), De La Salle University (Kelsey Hartigan-Go), University of the Philippines Diliman (Rodel Atanacio), University of the Philippines Los Baños (Alfonso Carandang), Xavier University (Bombim Cadiz) and St. Louis University (Ian Generalao); would eventually play a significant role in connecting the Philippines to the global Internet.

July 1993: Phase one of the Philnet project shifted into full gear after receiving funding from the DOST. It proved to be successful, as students from partner universities were able to send emails to the Internet by routing them through Philnet's gateway at the Ateneo de Manila University, which was connected to another gateway at the Victoria University of Technology in Australia via IDD Dial-Up (Hayes Modem).

November 1993: An additional ₱12.5-million grant for the first year's running cost was awarded by the DOST to buy equipment and lease communication lines needed to kickstart the second phase of Philnet, now led by Dr. Rudy Villarica.

March 29, 1994, 1:15 a.m. (PHT): Benjie Tan, who was working for ComNet, a company that supplied Cisco routers to the Philnet project, linked the Philippines’ first set-up and installed initial Internet connection at a PLDT network center at Ramon Cojuangco Building, Makati. Shortly thereafter, he posted a short message to the Usenet newsgroup soc.culture.filipino to alert Filipinos overseas that a link had been made. His message read: "As of March 29, 1994 at 1:15 am Philippine time, unfortunately 2 days late due to slight technical difficulties, the Philippines was FINALLY linked to the Internet via SprintLink. The Philippine router, a Cisco 7000 router, was attached via the services of PLDT and Sprint communications to SprintLink's router at Stockton Ca. The gateway to the world for the Philippines will be via NASA Ames Research Center. For now, a 64K serial link is the information highway to the rest of the Internet world."

March 29, 1994, "We're in!" – This announcement was made by Dr. John Brule, an American professor emeritus from Syracuse University, at exactly 10:18 A.M signifying that Philnet's 64 kbit/s Internet connection was live during the first International E-Mail Conference at the University of San Carlos in Talamban Campus, Cebu City. During the conference, they sent the nation's first email to STACnet and ran a live text-based Telnet connection to MIT.

2000: PLDT introduced its ADSL service.

August 8, 2009: The Congress of the Philippines granted Converge ICT's (then known as ComClark Network and Technology Corp.) franchise application to construct, install, establish, operate and maintain a telecommunication system throughout the country. Nine years after their franchise was granted, Converge ICT's coverage and service has matured enough to be a viable contender for the spot to becoming the 3rd major telecommunications company in the Philippines.

March 27, 2022: Satellite internet service provider Starlink received approval of its registration from the country's National Telecommunications Commission, setting the country as the first in Southeast Asia to have Starlink broadband service. This comes at the heels of the passage of Republic Act No. 11659 amending the Public Service Act passed in 1936. The amendment allows 100% foreign ownership of three primary public services which are telecommunications, airline, and railways.

October 10, 2024: Over 20 million Filipinos are set to enjoy better internet connectivity. The World Bank’s Digital Infrastructure Project for Philippines aims to improve climate resilient, secure and inclusive broadband connectivity. The project focuses on five components (i) backbone network, (ii) middle-mile network, (iii) access network (Last-Mile), (iv) network security, and (v) project management support. The project will focus on benefiting Filipinos outside the country’s main urban centres, where presently the connectivity is disproportionately concentrated.

=== Other developments ===
A year after the connection, in March 1995, the "Public Telecommunications Policy Act of the Philippines" was made into law. The law allowed securing a franchise optional for value-added service providers; it also enabled many other organizations to establish connections to the Internet, to create Web sites, and have their own Internet services or provide Internet service and access to others.

Although the growth of the Internet in the Philippines was hindered by unequal distribution of Internet infrastructure throughout the country, its cost, and corruption in the government, these obstacles did not altogether halt all the developments. More connection types were made available to more Filipinos, and there is an increase in bandwidth and a growing number of Filipino Internet users.

The Cybercrime Prevention Act of 2012, codified as Republic Act No. 10175, criminalized cybersquatting, cybersex, child pornography, identity theft, illegal access to data, and libel. The act has been criticized for its provision on criminalizing libel, which is perceived to be a curtailment in freedom of expression. After several petitions submitted to the Supreme Court of the Philippines questioned the constitutionality of the Act, the Supreme Court issued a temporary restraining order on October 9, 2012, stopping the implementation of the Act for 120 days. A Magna Carta for Philippine Internet Freedom was filed in the Philippine legislature in 2013 to, among others, repeal Republic Act No. 10175. The Implementing Rules and Regulations of Republic Act No. 10175 were promulgated on August 12, 2015.

Through Republic Act No. 10929 signed by President Rodrigo Duterte in August 2017, the Philippine government began providing free Internet in public places.

== Statistics ==
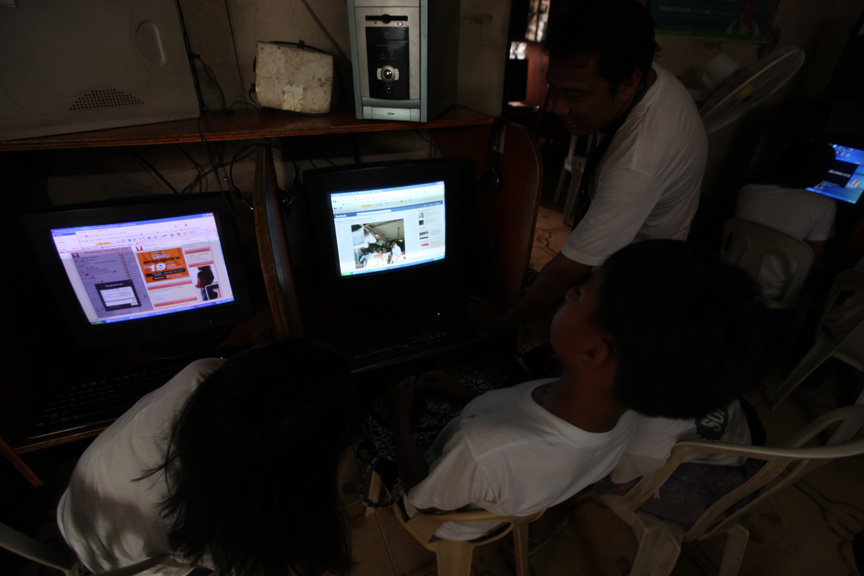
Internet café in the Philippines

Worldmap of web browsers in 2015. As of May 2026 in the Philippines, 87.46% use Google Chrome, 4.75% Safari, 4% Microsoft Edge, 1.31% Opera and 0.71% Firefox.

In 2022, according to Datareportal and Statista, about two to three of four Filipinos in the Philippines have access to the internet.

Among the findings in this report were:

- 68% to 72% of Filipinos have access to the Internet, with Filipino users having the highest daily average online consumption duration in the Southeast Asia region at around 10 hours.
- Internet user growth is around 2.8% year-on-year.
- 97.2% of users rely on their mobile phones as one of the (or the only) ways they access the internet.

In January 2024, there were 86.98 million internet users in the Philippines, with an internet penetration rate of 73.6 percent of the total population.

== Wireless broadband ==
=== TD-LTE ===
As the number of subscribers grew, both PLDT and Globe Telecom rapidly expanded their Time-Division Duplex-Long Term Evolution (TD-LTE) services for Fixed Wireless Broadband. According to PLDT, they spent ₱2 billion of its ₱28.8-billion capital expenditure for 2013 to bring TD-LTE technology to customers’ homes. According to industry data, the Philippines’ TD-LTE network was one of the largest deployments in Asia Pacific with over 200 base stations and an allocated bandwidth of 100 megabits per second (Mbps).

In January 2015, both PLDT and Globe Telecom began phasing out WiMax services in favor for TD-LTE.

==== Bandwidth caps ====
In October 2015, PLDT introduced so-called "volume boosters" (instead of 30% bandwidth throttling in 2014 and 256 kbit/s bandwidth throttling in 2015) when exceeding monthly 30 GB to 70 GB bandwidth cap for TD-LTE connection plans (Ultera). "In case your usage exceeds your monthly volume allowance, you can still enjoy the internet by purchasing additional volume boosters. Otherwise, connectivity will be halted until your monthly volume is refreshed on your next billing cycle." Globe followed suit with a similar "volume boost" arrangement.

==== Lock-in period ====
In 2015, PLDT increased lock-in period for TD-LTE connection plans from 24 to 36 months (3 years) with the pre-termination fee equal to the full balance for the remaining period. After the lock-in period the contract is automatically renewed for another 36 months subject to the same terms and conditions. As of 2016 the Globe lock-in period is still 2 years with no pre-termination fee outside of the lock-in period. The PLDT TD-LTE contract allows PLDT to change the terms and conditions at any time with the only way left for subscribers to opt out of the altered service through paying the full pre-termination fee: "8.3 Modification. SBI reserves the right at its discretion to modify, delete or add to any of the terms and conditions of this Agreement at any time without further notice. It is the Subscriber’s responsibility to regularly check any changes to these Terms and Conditions. The Subscriber’s continued use of the Service after any such changes constitutes acceptance of the new Terms and Conditions." Even as the Consumer Act of the Philippines states "Unfair or Unconscionable Sales Act or Practice ... the following circumstances shall be considered ... that the transaction that the seller or supplier induced the consumer to enter into was excessively one-sided in favor of the seller or supplier", the practice of inducing extremely long-term contracts with the ultimate pre-termination penalty has not been legally challenged yet.

== IP peering ==
The Philippines has 13 Internet Exchange points in the country. Philippine Open Internet Exchange (PhOPENIX), Philippine Internet Exchange (PhIX), Philippine Common Routing Exchange (PHNET CORE), PCTA Internet Exchange, Globe Internet Exchange (GIX), Bayan Telecommunications Internet and Gaming Exchange, Manila Internet Exchange (Manila IX), GetaFIX, Maharlika Internet Exchange (MHK-IX), BBIX-Manila, AMS-IX Manila, etc.

On June 16, 2016, Globe Telecom and PLDT agreed on a bilateral domestic IP peering arrangement.

== Internet speed ==
The Akamai Technologies Q1 2017 State of the Internet report contained information that, though average internet connection speed had increased 20% year-on-year, the Philippines, at 5.5 Mbit/s, once again had the lowest average connection speeds among surveyed Asia Pacific countries/regions. The report noted that Philippine President Rodrigo Duterte had approved a plan with a three to five-year timeline for completion to deploy a national broadband network at an estimated cost of US$1.5 billion to US$4.0 billion.

Internet speed improved drastically after President Rodrigo Duterte in SONA 2020 ordered telecommunications companies Smart Communications and Globe Telecom to improve their services in the next five months, and warned local government units to act on permit applications of telecommunications firms within three days or be charged with corruption or face possible suspension. In February 2022, the average fixed broadband download speeds rose from 7.91 Mbit/s to 82.61 Mbit/s, a 944% growth. Average mobile internet speeds have also seen a 467% growth at 42.22 Mbit/s from 7.44 Mbit/s since the start of the Duterte administration.

== Internet censorship ==
Access to the Internet in the Philippines stays as unrestricted as the constitutional legislative framework. There are neither overt Internet access government restrictions nor reports that the government monitors e-mail or Internet chat rooms without appropriate legal authority or judicial oversight. Individuals and groups are permitted to engage in the peaceful expression of views via the Internet, including by e-mail.

The constitution and law broadly provide for the right of freedom of thought, expression and press, and the government generally respects these rights in practice. Around 6.5% of the country's population got access to the Internet according to International Telecommunication Union statistics. The constitution and law prohibit arbitrary interference with privacy, family, home, or correspondence, and the authorities generally prohibit those from happening in practice. Internet access is widely available and free to use without any limitations regardless of circumstances.

The passing of the Cybercrime Prevention Act in 2012 was a subject of concern by human rights activists especially its provisions on cyberlibel. The law was challenged and the Supreme Court ruled in 2014 that the original author of libelous content is only liable against the law saying that the act of posting libelous content is not a crime. The court also iterated that access to websites can't be restricted by the Department of Justice without a prior court order and that the government could not monitor individuals in "real time" without the court order.

In 2017, a large number of pornographic websites, including Pornhub, Xhamster, and RedTube, were blocked under suspicion of hosting child pornography.

In September 2020, the Movie and Television Review and Classification Board (MTRCB) proposed to regulate content distributed through online streaming services including Netflix believing that these content falls under their mandate to regulate and classify "all forms" of motion pictures. The plans raised concerns over censorship and were eventually abandoned by the MTRCB.

In 2021, the Philippine Army launched cyberattacks to block access to alternative news websites Bulatlat and AlterMidya. Mass media advocates from the Freedom for Media Freedom for All coalition condemned the cyberattacks, which it described as assaults on press freedom and free expression.

In June 2022, the National Telecommunications Commission issued an order for internet service providers to block access to 26 websites that were allegedly "affiliated to and are supporting" the Communist Party of the Philippines, New People's Army, and the National Democratic Front, including Bulatlat. A Quezon City court issued an injunction in August 2022 ordering the NTC to unblock Bulatlat's website, citing the news website's rights to be protected by the constitutional provision on freedom of speech and of the press.

In November 2025, a Quezon City court ordered the unblocking of the websites it had censored, saying that the NTC blocking is content-based prior restraint that "violates the constitutional guarantees of free speech and expression". The court said that the Philippine Anti-Terror Act is not a legal basis for the NTC order to block the websites.

== Internet during the COVID-19 pandemic ==
At the height of the COVID-19 pandemic in 2020, the Philippine government under President Rodrigo Duterte pressured the country's internet service providers to hasten their infrastructure development to keep up with the growing demand for fast and stable connection for work-from-home and online learning. The focus quickly shifted from DSL to fiber internet, and average internet speeds increased. Additionally, the Philippines' third telco player, Dito Telecommunity, was launched and commenced operations.

== Digital Progress ==
In September 2023, the World Bank provided a US$600-million loan to the Philippines for its First Digital Transformation Development Policy Loan (DPL), focusing on digitizing government services and expanding digital finance. This initiative targets reducing cash reliance in transactions and boosting digital services and e-commerce. Additionally, it addresses the high cost of internet access for small businesses. The loan aims to facilitate the country's transition to a digital economy, emphasizing financial inclusion for underserved and unbanked populations.

== See also ==
- Digital divide in the Philippines
- Telecommunications in the Philippines
- Social media use in the Philippines
- Open Access in Data Transmission Act
- Magna Carta for Philippine Internet Freedom
