= FinTech Alliance PH =

Philippine financial tech non-profit

FinTech Alliance Philippines
- Abbreviation: FintechAlliancePH
- Formation: 2017
- Founder: Lito Villanueva
- Founded at: Manila, Philippines
- Type: Non-profit industry association
- Legal status: Active
- Purpose: Advancing financial technology and digital finance
- Headquarters: Makati City, Manila, Philippines
- Location: Philippines
- Coordinates: 14°35′58″N 120°59′03″E
- Region served: Southeast Asia
- Members: 100+
- Key people: Lito Villanueva (Founding Chairman); Nenette Mandap (Executive Director)
- Website: fintechalliance.ph
- Remarks: Represents 95% of digital retail financial transactions in the Philippines

FinTech Alliance PH is a non-profit organization in the Philippines dedicated to advancing the financial technology (fintech) sector. Founded in 2017, the alliance plays a role in promoting digital innovation, financial inclusivity, and regulatory collaboration within the Philippine financial ecosystem.

== History ==
FinTech Alliance PH was established by Lito Villanueva, a prominent figure in digital finance who serves as its founding chairman. Villanueva, who is also the executive vice president and chief innovation and inclusion officer at Rizal Commercial Banking Corporation (RCBC), has been a driving force in promoting digital transformation and inclusive finance in the Philippines.

The organization claims to be the Philippines' premier digital industry association, with a membership comprising over 100 corporate entities that collectively represent more than 95% of the country's digital retail financial transaction volume. Notably, it was the first organization of its kind in Asia to establish an industry-led code of conduct and code of ethics, positioning itself as a self-regulating body committed to maintaining high standards in the fintech ecosystem.

=== Key contributions ===
The Alliance has been instrumental in several critical areas of financial technology and inclusion:

- National Strategy Influence: Played a role in shaping the government's National Strategy for Financial Inclusion and the National Retail Payments System.
- Digital Payments Transformation: Actively supported the implementation of the Digital Payments Transformation Roadmap.
- Research and Reporting: Publishes the annual Philippines FinTech Report, providing comprehensive insights into the country's digital financial landscape.
- Industry Events: Organizes significant events such as the Manila Tech Summit and manages the Bagong Pilipinas: The Philippines Country Pavilion at the Singapore FinTech Festival.

=== International collaborations ===
FinTech Alliance PH has extended its influence beyond national borders by:

- Co-founding the Asia FinTech Alliance
- Establishing the Alliance of Digital Finance Associations in South Africa

== Recent developments ==
=== Strategic partnership with AIM ===
In 2024, FinTech Alliance PH formed a strategic partnership with the Asian Institute of Management (AIM) for the Manila Tech Summit 2024. This collaboration aims to:

- Develop a highly skilled workforce in digital finance
- Create a pool of internationally competitive digital talent
- Leverage AIM's Master of Science in Financial Technology program, jointly delivered with Manchester Metropolitan University

=== Advocacy for digital connectivity ===
The organization has been actively advocating for the "Konektadong Pinoy Act" bill (Open Access in Data Transmission Act), which seeks to:

- Improve internet access to enhance digital payments
- Support the Bangko Sentral ng Pilipinas' goal of 70% adult transaction account coverage
- Encourage telecommunications infrastructure development

=== Pioneering achievement ===
As the first organization of its kind in Asia, FinTech Alliance PH has created an industry-led Code of Conduct and Code of Ethics, establishing a self-regulatory framework for fintech development.

=== Strategic contributions ===
The Alliance has been instrumental in:

- Shaping the government's National Strategy for Financial Inclusion
- Supporting the National Retail Payments System implementation
- Driving the Digital Payments Transformation Roadmap

=== Key initiatives ===
- Annual publication of the Philippines FinTech Report
- Organizing pivotal industry events:
  - Manila Tech Summit
  - Bagong Pilipinas: The Philippines Country Pavilion at the Singapore FinTech Festival

=== Role and impact ===
FinTech Alliance PH serves as a resource for:

- Regulators
- Policymakers
- Legislators

The organization concentrates on:

- Digital payments advancement
- Financial education
- Promoting inclusive digital finance

=== International collaborations ===
The alliance has established international partnerships, co-founding:

- Asia FinTech Alliance
- South Africa-based Alliance of Digital Finance Associations
