= PT&T =

Telecommunications company in the Philippines

- Logo used since 2018
- Company type: Public
- Traded as: PSE: PTT (suspended since December 13, 2004)
- Founded: November 14, 1962; 62 years ago
- Key people: Roberto B. Ortiz, Chairman; James G. Velasquez, President and CEO
- Products: Broadband (Connectivity); IT Services
- Net income: -₱22.79 million ▲ (2021)
- ASN: 18233
- Website: https://www.ptt.com.ph

The Philippine Telegraph and Telephone Corporation (PT&T) is a telecommunications service provider in the Philippines since its establishment in 1962. The company caters to corporate, small/medium business, and residential segments across the country. PT&T's business is categorized into two major services: Connectivity and IT Services.

== History ==
PT&T was incorporated on October 16, 1962, and subsequently registered with the Philippine Securities and Exchange Commission on November 14, 1962, under the laws of the Philippines.

PT&T was granted a 25-year national legislative franchise on June 20, 1964, under Republic Act (“RA”) No. 4161, as amended by RA Nos. 5048 and 6970. On July 21, 2016, under RA No. 10894, the company was granted an extension of its franchise for another 25 years.

PT&T was listed on January 10, 1990, for the trading of its common shares but requested voluntary suspension of trading effective December 13, 2004.

Former logo of PT&T during 1990s to early 2000s

It was a major competitor of PLDT in the 1990s prior to the 1997 Asian financial crisis.

In 2017, a consortium led by businessmen Lucio Tan, Jr., Salvador Zamora II, and Benjamin Bitanga acquired a majority stake of 70% in the ownership of PT&T from its previous owner Republic Telecommunication Holdings. The acquisition price was not disclosed.

In November 2017, the company announced that it entered negotiations with China Telecom and Datang Telecom Technology regarding plans to form a consortium for its bid. In 2018, PT&T bid to become the country's third telecommunications provider. PT&T was disqualified, thus the winner of the bid were the Mislatel consortium (which became Dito Telecommunity). The National Telecommunications Commission (NTC) said that PT&T failed to meet the technical requirements it set for bidders.

== Ownership ==
Updated Shareholding Structure of PT&T as of 31 December 2022:
Major Shareholder	% of total	Common Shares
Menlo Capital Corporation	37.33%	559,999,998
Telectronic Systems, Inc. (TSI)	20.00%	300,000,241
Republic Telecommunications Holdings, Inc. (RETELCOM)	18.59%	278,873,526
TIMCO Holdings, Inc.	8.08%	121,126,474
Public	15.99%	239,992,753

== See also ==
- Telecommunications in the Philippines
- Internet in the Philippines
- List of companies of the Philippines
- Companies listed on the Philippine Stock Exchange
- Companies based in Makati
