= FHN =

FHN may refer to:

- Fiberhome Networks
- First Horizon National Corporation
- FitzHugh–Nagumo model
- Forest Hills Northern High School
