= Digital divide in the Philippines =

Differences in access to information technologies

The digital divide the Philippines refers to inequalities between individuals, households, and other groups of different demographic and socioeconomic levels in the Philippines in access to information and communication technologies ("ICTs") and in the knowledge and skills needed to effectively use the information gained from connecting.

== Background ==
In the Philippines about 47 to 50% of the population can and has access to the Internet. Initially the Philippines only had BBS (Bulletin board system) access, however after March 29, 1994, the Philippine Network Foundation (PHNet) connected the country to the web via Sprint. As of 2010, 29.3 million Filipinos were using the internet. The digital divide is impacted by several factors that includes income and education. Jim-yong Kim, president of the World Bank Group, has stated that “We must continue to connect everyone and leave no one behind because the cost of lost opportunities is enormous. But for digital dividends to be widely shared among all parts of society, countries also need to improve their business climate, invest in people's education and health, and promote good governance.”

== Impact on politics and culture ==
Based on Philippines government research, there is a noticeable rise of Internet use in the Philippines after it was first introduced on March 29, 1994. “They were connected to the internet via SprintLink”, this changed the Philippines culturally and politically. Social media is a leading motive for Internet use in the Philippines, but Internet use also plays a big part in their political communications. The Philippine presidential election of Estrada is where Internet use for politics started to take form. Due to the protests, Filipinos used Internet to display charges against Estrada.

== Education ==
The Philippines was the only country in the Southeast Asia region that had a declining youth literacy rate between the years of 1990 and 2004, according to data from the United Nations. This prompted major school reforms and in 2012, a K-12 school curriculum was introduced which included a year of kindergarten and two senior school years. The Department of Education in the Philippines (DepEd) goal for students who graduate from the K-12 curriculum is for these students to understand technology works and how they can benefit from it.

The curriculum of this program focuses on developing students to be comfortable with using computers and technology. Some examples are that in grade 4 students will learn how to use the basic functions of the computer, including the use of the internet and emailing, in safe ways. In grade 6, students will begin taking art classes to learn how to use technology for digital paintings and graphic designs. In grade 7, students will begin learning how to academically use the internet for journals and searching for academic sources for essays and other similar assignments. In the higher upper level grades, the curriculum will include schools that specialize in computer education as well as science and technology. The Philippines being able to close in on the technology gap after being so behind in the 1990s and early 2000s is going to very much improve the graduation rate of the students now that they can study at home and use their sources to their advantage through tablets and computers instead of only being able to access their school work in the classroom.

== Addressing the digital divide through ICT4D projects ==
ICT4D projects in the Philippines aim to act as a supplementary role or sometimes act as the initiator in development projects. ICT projects for development usually aim to provide an enhanced ability to communicate to others and receive up-to-date information in an instantaneous speed, reducing the gap in the digital divide.

As of August 2004, according to a study in the Philippine Journal of Public Administration, there are 402 ICT projects for development known. A majority of the projects listed were government initiatives and based on the National Capital Region.

=== Projects in E-governance ===
- 26 national agencies had websites linked to the Philippine government portal (www.gov.ph).
- The National Computer Center (NCC) ensures that 99.6% of all local government units have a web presence.
- 50% of national government agencies use SMS based services for surveys, complaints, suggestions, and requests for information.
- The National Computer Center's e-LGU project uses developed applications for the local government units to use for tax mapping and revenue generating systems.
- National Economic and Development Authority (NEDA) uses an interactive web-based database system that allows other government offices and regional NEDA offices to directly post and update information on their respective programs and projects.
- A highly acclaimed computerization project at the Bureau of Customs allowed for paperless, queue-less, and cashless processing through electronic systems such as the Automated Customs Operating System (ACOS), the Online Release System (ORS) and the Direct Trader Input (DTI) or teleclearance.
- An Emergency Computer Aided Dispatch (ECAD) helps authorities track the origin of emergency calls and how fast the police could respond to emergency calls. This was implemented in Davao City. Marikina's 161 and Cavite's 161 are similar programs.

=== Projects in E-business ===
- Aboitiz provides an e-ticketing/SMS ticketing service for passengers to directly book and pay for their own tickets for any SuperFerry voyage available online.
- The APEC Centre for Technology Exchange for Small and Medium Enterprise by Asia Pacific Economic Council (APEC) intends to accelerate the developments of SMEs in the region through information, technology and training exchange to make them more competitive locally and internationally. It operates as a resources hub to facilitate technology transfer projects and HRD development through training.

=== Projects in E-learning ===
- In 1999, Fr. Francis Lucas has documented a radio broadcasting model for teaching rural women in Quezon about farming technologies.
- The National Broadcasting Network and the National Institute for Science and Math Education made use of the telelvision in its Continuing Science Education for Teachers via Television (CONSTEL) project to train elementary school teachers in teaching Science, English, and Math.
- The United Nations Development Programme piloted the Text2Teach program in 40 elementary public schools in poorer areas in the Philippines which enables schools to order science videos from electronic libraries using SMS.
- Children and Youth Foundation of the Philippines and the Center for Industrial Technology and Enterprise started the e-Skills Learning Project, which aims to improve the quality, the delivery system, and widen the reach of skills and technical training and education. The curriculum can be accessed through the internet, and through CDs for those who have no access to the internet.
- A program called the Ed-venture project provides computers, internet connectivity, training and after training support for public high schools.
- The Diliman Interactive Learning Center provides technical support and facilities for faculty members to develop digital instructional resources.
- The Philippine Research, Education and Government Information Network (PREGINET) established a nationwide broadband network for research and education institutions involved in the development and demonstration of new technologies.
- Department of Transportation and Communications (DOTC) in partnership with Science Education Institute and Intel Philippines provided Mobile Information Technology Classrooms (MITCs) that uses an air-conditioned bus with 17 laptops, television sets, 2 VHS players, 2 LCD projectors, 2 projector screens, a public address system, a printer, and a generator set on board. Similar projects by the Bulacan province and the Department of Science and Technology are being pursued.

=== Projects in E-health ===
- Department of Health’s Hotlines and Textlines
- Med Info. Inc. provides an SMS service that allows users to ask about disease symptoms and information about medication.
- The Information and Communication Technology Capacity Building for Asia Network (ITCAN) project is an Internet based communication service that provides quality HIV/AIDS and sexual reproductive health services and information.
- Several LGUs, such as the Quezon City Government made use of their websites to register and book for the COVID-19 vaccination.

=== Projects in E-employment ===
- The Overseas Workers Welfare Association provided “Tele-Ugnayan Centers” around Iraq during the war, which served as pseudo-calling centers to link OFWs in the Middle East with their families at home.
- Balikabayanihan is a project by Atikha Overseas Workers & Communities Initiative, Inc., supported by the Department of Trade and Industry. It aims OFWs and their families to bridge the communication gap and problems brought by prolonged separation. They recently launched a campaign called Start and Improve Your Business (SIYB) Training to help OFWs run their own businesses after losing their jobs due to the global pandemic.
- The Department of Labor and Employment (DOLE) (dole.gov.ph) also provides an online service for OFW applicants to check the status of recruitment agencies in the country.
- The SMART Padala Remittance Service was hailed as the world's first international cash-sending scheme using SMS technology through the Smart Money platform.
- The Department of Labor and Employment created a web-based job matching service (https://www.philjobnet.gov.ph) that pairs individual job applicants to interested establishments based on their location and skills.

=== Projects for E-environment ===
- Bantay Usok, Bantay Dagat and Bantay Kalikasan are projects making use of SMS services for citizens to report cases of environmental pollution or degradation.
- Miriam College’s Radio Kalikasan was useful in raising awareness in environmental causes. The local radio program started back in 1991.
- The National Disaster Coordinating Center and the PAG-ASA use satellite technology to monitor the weather and environmental disturbances, which are updated on PAG-ASA’s website and social media accounts.

=== Projects for E-agriculture ===
- Several ICT projects for agriculture are used as a database for research to connect research and development agencies nationwide:
  1. Agriculture and Fisheries Research and Development Information System (AFRDIS) project by the Bureau of Agricultural Research (BAR)
  2. Agriculture and Natural Resources Information Network (AGRINET) by the Department of Science and Technology (DOST)
  3. Farmers' Information and Technology Services (FITS)/TechnoPinoy Databases by Philippine Council for Agriculture, Aquatic and Natural Resources Research and Development (PCAARD)
- PH Domain Foundation makes use of maillists for knowledge-sharing and provide an online consultancy program.
- The website of Bureau of Agricultural Statistics has a daily updated price watch and links to PAG-ASA regarding the weather situation.
- Geographic information systems are being used in agriculture to identify soil patterns and topographies and mapping properties disposed of in agrarian reform communities.

=== Projects for E-science ===
- The Advanced Science and Technology Institute of DOST is developing open source software through Linux Terminal Server Project. The Bayanihan linux aims to optimize usage of open-source free software.
- Computer Eyes is a program implemented by IBM Philippines together with Resources for the Blind to teach blind students how computers work, word processing, building their personal websites, etc.
- The E-library project integrates libraries and information sources into a single network system, with focus on Philippine materials. The database could only be accessible through subscription.
