= Konektadong Pinoy Act =

2025 Telecommunications law in the Philippines

Congress of the Philippines
- Long title: An Act Establishing a Comprehensive and Inclusive Data Transmission and Connectivity Framework for the Philippines
- Citation: Republic Act No. 12234
- Territorial extent: Philippines
- Enacted by: House of Representatives of the Philippines
- Enacted: December 12, 2022
- Enacted by: Senate of the Philippines
- Enacted: February 5, 2025
- Became law by inaction: August 24, 2025
- Commenced: December 17, 2025
- Effective: September 14, 2025

Legislative history

Initiating chamber: House of Representatives of the Philippines
- Bill title: An Act Promoting Open Access in Data Transmission and Providing Additional Powers to the National Telecommunications Commission
- Bill citation: House Bill 6
- Introduced by: Martin Romualdez, Yedda Romualdez, and Jude Acidre
- Co-sponsored by: Christian Yap, Jurdin Jesus Romuald, Ralph Recto, Mikee Romero, Harris Ongchuan, Jose Francisco Benitez, Ernix Dionisio, Gerville Luistro, Toby Tiangco, Wilter Palma, Christopherson Yap, Keith Micah Tan, Shernee Tan-Tambut, Bong Rivera, Carl Cari, Ace Barbers, Jolo Revilla, Linabelle Villarica, Tonypet Albano, John Tracy Cagas, Edwin Olivarez, Jaime Cojuangco, Gerardo Valmayor Jr., Loreto Acharon, Lorenz Defensor, Sonny Lagon, Daphne Lagon, Gustavo Tambunting, Arnan Panaligan, Roman Romulo, Eduardo Rama Jr., Dean Asistio, Richelle Singson-Michael, Bryan Revilla, Jose Gay Padiernos, Carlito Marquez, Luis Raymund Villafuerte, Fernando Cabredo, Antonio Legarda Jr., Jernie Jett Nisay, Yevgeny Emano, Alan Dujali, Edgar Chatto, and Irwin Tieng
- Introduced: June 30, 2022
- First reading: November 29, 2022
- Second reading: December 5, 2022
- Third reading: December 12, 2022
- Voting summary: 243 voted for; None voted against; 3 abstained
- Committee report: Committee Report No. 185

Revising chamber: Senate of the Philippines
- Bill title: An Act Establishing a Comprehensive and Inclusive Data Transmission and Connectivity Framework for the Philippines
- Bill citation: Senate Bill 2699
- Received from the House of Representatives of the Philippines: May 22, 2024
- Member(s) in charge: Alan Peter Cayetano, Imee Marcos, Win Gatchalian, Grace Poe, Bong Revilla, Juan Miguel Zubiri, Joel Villanueva, Raffy Tulfo, Lito Lapid, Jinggoy Estrada, Loren Legarda, and Francis Tolentino
- First reading: July 29, 2024
- Second reading: February 4, 2025
- Third reading: February 5, 2025
- Voting summary: 17 voted for; None voted against; None abstained
- Committee report: Committee Report No. 262
- Conference committee bill passed by House of Representatives of the Philippines: June 9, 2025
- Conference committee bill passed by Senate of the Philippines: June 9, 2025
- Status: In force

The Konektadong Pinoy Act formerly known as Open Access in Data Transmission Act, officially designated as Republic Act No. 12234, is an internet and telecommunications law in the Philippines. The consolidated bill (House Bill No. 6 and Senate Bill No. 2699) was passed by the 19th Congress of the Philippines and lapsed into law without the President's signature on August 24, 2025. The law contains provisions encouraging the development of data transmission infrastructure and removing any barrier to competition in data transmission services. It also aims to protect and promote the internet as an open platform enabling consumer choice, freedom of expression, end-user control, competition and freedom to innovate without permission.

== Background ==
The Philippine telecommunications industry was liberalized in 1995 with the passage of the Republic Act No. 7925 or the Public Telecommunications Policy Act. Prior to the enactment of the law, the telecommunications industry was heavily dominated by the Philippine Long Distance Telephone Company (PLDT). On March 29, 1994, Internet first became available and has since become commercially available for consumer, private business, government and institutional use.

Business process outsourcing in the Philippines (BPO) started in 1997. Significant number of BPO companies depend on internet connectivity to perform its function. Revenues from this new industry has since contributed significant percentage to the Philippines' Gross Domestic Product. With the industry becoming competitive locally, many industry players offered remote work opportunities, taking advantage of the advancement of technology such as videotelephony, virtual private network, and remote desktop software. On December 20, 2018, Republic Act No. 11165 or the Telecommuting Act was enacted, setting a state policy on remote work and flexible work arrangements.

During the COVID-19 pandemic, many businesses, organizations, government and academic institutions were forced to close and switch to remote work as a contingency plan. Much of the local home data and mobile telecommunications infrastructure went on high demand that resulted to slow data transmission. Despite the passage of Republic Act No. 11494 on September 14, 2020, or the Bayanihan to Recover as One Act, to facilitate a streamlined process of approving local and national government permits to build telecommunications infrastructure, the telecommunication sector remained uncompetitive as there was no legislation that prohibited public telecommunication entities (PTEs) from bandwidth throttling, state oversight on PTEs performance on data transmission, among others.

== Legislative history ==
=== 16th Congress ===
Senate Bill No. 53, known as the Magna Carta for Philippine Internet Freedom, was filed on July 1, 2013 by then Senator Miriam Defensor Santiago. It proposes a coherent national ICT policy framework, including universal access, net neutrality, and equitable infrastructure development. It aims to encourage open government data and e-governance initiatives to enhance transparency and citizen participation.

=== 18th Congress ===
==== House ====
House representative Victor Yap of Tarlac 2nd district filed House Bill No. 00057 on July 1, 2019. This was followed by Francis Gerald Abaya of Cavite 1st district on August 22, 2019, with House Bill No. 04109, Johnny Pimentel of Surigao del Sur 2nd district on November 12, 2019, with House Bill No. 05341 and Joy Tambunting of Parañaque 2nd district on January 18, 2021, with House Bill No. 08383. House Bill No. 08910 was introduced as a substitute bill of the 4 prior bills by the House Committee on Information and Communications Technology on March 5, 2021, and approved by the same committee on March 9, 2021.

After series of interpellations and amendments in the House plenary, the bill passed on second reading on March 16, 2021. On July 28, 2021, with 200 affirmative and no negative votes, the bill passed on third and final reading.

==== Senate ====
On July 29, 2021, the bill was transmitted to the Senate for action. Senate Bill No. 45 was filed by Senate President Pro Tempore Ralph Recto and Grace Poe, while Senate Bill No. 911, was filed by Senator Ramon Bong Revilla Jr. Its Economic Planning Office only conducted a webinar on the said measure on July 7, 2021. The Senate Committee on Science and Technology chaired by Senator Nancy Binay failed to take action on the measure.

=== 19th Congress ===
==== House ====
House representatives Martin Romualdez of Leyte 1st district, Yedda Romualdez and Jude Acidre of Tingog Party List filed House Bill No. 6 on June 30, 2022. This was followed by Christian Yap of Tarlac 2nd district on June 30, 2022, with House Bill No. 2382, Jurdin Jesus Romualdo of Camiguin lone district on July 26, 2022, with House Bill No. 2566 and Ralph Recto of Batangas 6th district on August 3, 2022, with House Bill No. 3591. House Bill No. 4164, House Bill No. 5085, House Bill No. 5464, and House Bill No. 5854 was introduced as a substitute bill of the 7 prior bills by the House Committee on Information and Communications Technology on November 28, 2022, and approved by the same committee on November 29, 2022.

After series of interpellations and amendments in the House plenary, the bill passed on second reading on December 5, 2022. On December 12, 2022, with 243 affirmative, no negative and 3 abstain votes, the bill passed the third and final reading.

==== Senate ====
Measures in the 19th Congress stated on Senate Bill No. 183, filed on 7 July 2022 by Senator Imee Marcos. Entitled the Open Access in Internet Services Act, her version sought to promote competition and innovation in the telecommunications sector. Senator Grace Poe introduced Senate Bill No. 864 on 25 July 2022, with the same title. Poe's version emphasized consumer protection and the need for a more competitive environment in internet services. On 12 October 2022, Senate President Juan Miguel Zubiri filed Senate Bill No. 1383, likewise carrying the same title. His sponsorship underscored the recognition of the urgency of telecommunications reform. Senator Joel Villanueva filed Senate Bill No. 1611 on 14 December 2022, again under the same title. Villanueva's explanatory note highlighted the high cost and poor quality of Philippine internet services. On 6 February 2023, Senator Raffy Tulfo filed Senate Bill No. 1845, with the same title. Tulfo's version reinforced the growing consensus among senators that a comprehensive framework was needed to liberalize and expand internet services. On 14 February 2023, Senator Lito Lapid filed Senate Bill No. 1876, entitled the Open Access in Data Transmission Act. This broadened the scope of the reform effort by explicitly addressing data transmission infrastructure and the regulatory powers of the National Telecommunications Commission. Then 9 May 2023, Senator Jinggoy Estrada filed Senate Bill No. 2146, also titled the Open Access in Data Transmission Act. Estrada’s filing further demonstrated the bipartisan and multi‑sectoral support for reforming the country’s digital backbone. All of these measures, SBN 183, 864, 1383, 1611, 1845, 1876, and 2146, were referred to the Committee on Science and Technology joint with the Committee of Public Services. After extensive deliberations, they were consolidated into Committee Report No. 262, submitted on 29 July 2024. This committee report became the foundation of Senate Bill No. 2699.

On 27 January 2025, President Bongbong Marcos certified Senate Bill No. 2699 as urgent and was acted by the Senate plenary on 3 February 2025.

The bill passed the second reading on February 4, 2025. On the next day, with 17 affirmative votes, the bill passed on third and final reading.

==== Bicameral ====
After the Senate approved Senate Bill No. 2699 on 5 February 2025, the measure was transmitted to the House of Representatives for concurrence. Because the Senate and House versions contained differences, a bicameral conference committee was convened to reconcile them.

On 4 June 2025, the bicameral conference committee formally opened its deliberations. The Senate panel was led by Senator Alan Peter Cayetano (chair of the Committee on Science and Technology), joined by Senator Grace Poe (chair of the Committee on Public Services), Senator Sherwin Gatchalian, Senator Francis Escudero, and Senator Aquilino Pimentel III. On the House side, the conferees were Representative John Reynald Tiangco (Navotas), Representative Joel Cabredo (Albay, 2nd District), Representative Jolo Revilla (Cavite, 1st District), Representative Arnan Panaligan (Oriental Mindoro, 2nd District), and Representative Richard Ongchuan (Northern Samar, 2nd District).

Reports from the Senate and House indicated that the most contentious issues — the scope of "open access," the regulatory powers of the National Telecommunications Commission, and provisions for equitable rollout in underserved areas — were harmonized. On 9 June 2025, the bicameral committee reached agreement on the reconciled text and formally approved its bicameral report.

On the same day, Both chambers approved bills for bicameral committee conference. And transmitted to the President on July 24, 2025.

==== Lapsed ====
On August 24, 2025, the bill lapsed into law without the President taking action. After fifteen days it was published in the Official Gazette since August 29, 2025, the law effective on September 14, 2025.

== Implementation ==
The Department of Information and Communications Technology submitted Implementing Rules and Regulations (IRR) on October 2, 2025. The DICT signed IRR on November 5, 2025, while it released IRR on December 1, 2025 effective for 15 days by December 17, 2025.

== Reaction ==
=== Support ===
In a statement from Department of Information and Communications Technology through Secretary Gringo Honasan on March 20, 2021, the DICT expressed its support for the bill. He added that the DICT supports any policies aimed at spurring the growth of information and communications technology in the country.

The Philippine Chamber of Commerce and Industry also expressed its support for the bill. They stated that if the bill is enacted to a law, it lowers barriers to market entry, fast-track and lower the cost of deploying broadband facilities, and make more spectrum available for Internet service.

Several foreign chambers of commerce, as well as the Management Association of the Philippines (MAP), Philippine Association of Multinational Companies Regional Headquarters, Semiconductor and Electronics Industries in the Philippines Incorporated (SEIPI) also expressed support for the measure. They stated that developing competitive digital infrastructure would be essential for better lives for everyone in the Philippines and critical for local and foreign investments.

Several group expresses support bill such as National Association of Data Protection Officers of the Philippines, the Philippine Computer Emergency Response Team, the Philippine Cable and Telecommunications Association, Inc. (PCTA), the Game Developers Association of the Philippines, the Global Digital Inclusion Partnership, Web3 Pangasinan, and the De La Salle University’s Jesse M. Robredo Institute of Governance.

Thirty-five ICT industry groups and fifty-three medical and healthcare associations expressed support for the bill.

The telecoms group expresses support law such as Converge ICT and Dito Telecommunity. PLDT and Globe Telecom additionally support for the drafting and implementation of the Implementing Rules and Regulations (IRR) from the previous against the law.

DICT Secretary Henry Aguda defended the Konektadong Pinoy Act on June 26, 2025, saying it would open the market to more internet players by removing the need for a legislative franchise or a certificate of public convenience and necessity. He argued this would lower costs and expand access, while assuring that security and regulatory concerns raised by telco groups would be addressed by the DICT and NTC through implementing rules. Aguda described the measure as landmark legislation that could cut internet prices and boost connectivity by 2028, especially in underserved areas.

=== Oppose ===
Some members of the Philippine Chamber of Telecommunications Operators (PCTO), namely PLDT and Globe Telecom, strongly opposed the law, citing concerns about national security risks, the alleged unconstitutionality of certain provisions of the law, undermining regulatory oversight, conflicts with existing laws, erosion of investor confidence, and cybersecurity risks posed by the entry of smaller players.

== Policy and scope ==
The law declares a state policy to promote, develop, and sustain new communication technologies and high-quality data transmission services at affordable cost, aligned with national needs in e-governance, education, health, trade, finance, disaster preparedness, and public safety. It adopts open access across all segments of the data transmission network, encourages infrastructure sharing and co-location to avoid uneconomic duplication, and commits to efficient, transparent spectrum management that prevents monopolistic control and fosters fair competition and equitable access to services.

This Act applies to all data transmission industry participants, including VoIP providers, internet service providers, and satellite systems providers or operators. Public telecommunications entities and value-added service providers are covered to the extent of their data transmission services, and access providers must comply with this Act and its implementing policies, rules, and regulations. The data transmission network is segmented into international gateway facilities, core or backbone, middle mile, last mile, and any additional segment defined by the Department of Information and Communications Technology (DICT).

== Definitions and network segments ==
This Act provides detailed definitions to operationalize open access. Access is defined as making facilities or services available to another entity for the provision of data transmission services, including access to network elements, passive and active infrastructure, data transmission networks, and virtual network services. It creates an access list to be jointly determined by the DICT, National Telecommunications Commission (NTC), and the Philippine Competition Commission (PCC), identifying infrastructure and services whose access is necessary for competitive provision of data transmission. Access providers are entities owning, leasing, or operating items on the access list, while access seekers are participants requesting such access. The law also defines active and passive infrastructure, core or backbone networks, last mile and middle mile, data transmission (including VoIP but excluding basic telephone service), and key spectrum terms such as allocation, assignment, recall, and the National Radio Frequency Allocation Table. It distinguishes underserved and unserved areas as defined by the DICT and specifies what constitutes unutilized and underutilized spectrum for purposes of recall under the Spectrum Management Policy Framework (SMPF).

== Roles of DICT and NTC ==
The DICT is established as the highest policy-making body on data transmission and connectivity. It must formulate open-access plans and policies; ensure technology-neutral approaches; assist the PCC on significant market power policy; set policy for NTC eligibility criteria; coordinate to secure orbital slots; incentivize investment and rollout—especially in unserved or underserved areas—through coordination with the Board of Investments (BOI), Philippine Economic Zone Authority (PEZA), Fiscal Incentives Review Board (FIRB), and the local government units (LGUs); develop the Spectrum Management Policy Framework within one year from effectivity of the Implementing Rules and Regulations (IRR) and update it every four years; define underserved and unserved areas with priority for those near educational institutions; recommend performance standards; and craft policies to safeguard local data while giving primacy to cross-border data flows as key to the global economy. DICT policies require public consultation before issuance.

The NTC serves as the principal regulatory and adjudicatory body for data transmission, tasked to keep the sector open and accessible; set eligibility criteria within one month from IRR effectivity; implement efficient registration procedures; issue satellite technology rules in consultation with DICT; promulgate competition-promoting rules with the PCC, including guidance on entities with significant market power; mandate pricing transparency and regular publication; require access providers to offer access to items on the access list; publish and update a registry of participants; implement the SMPF; review spectrum allocation and assignment every four years and undertake measures such as recall and restacking; coordinate with PCC to prevent anti-competitive concentration in spectrum assignment or recall; set performance standards within six months of IRR effectivity and monitor compliance; and impose fees and administrative penalties necessary to achieve the Act's objectives.

== Registration, certification, and access ==
All network segments are declared competitive and open, and all participants may put up their own networks. The NTC must adopt a speedy administrative registration process aligned with DICT policy and eligibility criteria. Entities using spectrum must obtain NTC authorization and assignment; foreign entrants are governed by the Foreign Investments Act as amended, the Public Service Act as amended, and related issuances. Operation of international gateway facilities or core/backbone networks requires NTC authorization, which considers route or rollout and manner of construction.

Participants must meet cybersecurity obligations. Within two years from registration, each must secure a third-party cybersecurity certification based on prevailing ISO information security standards or other DICT-specified minimum standards, and all are subject to audit by the DICT Cybersecurity Bureau.

The Spectrum Management Policy Framework is central to ensuring fair competition, technological adaptability, and efficient spectrum use. Within three months from IRR effectivity, the NTC must review existing allocations and assignments with DICT, then provide recommendations to inform the SMPF. The DICT, with NTC and PCC, must promulgate the SMPF within one year of IRR effectivity, review it annually, and update it every four years or as needed. The SMPF must cover spectrum valuation and pricing, assignment procedures with validity periods and obligations, joint use/co-use processes with transparency requirements, recall rules and procedures including timelines for unutilized or underutilized spectrum, publishing of spectrum decisions, a seven-day deemed approval for unacted equipment import permits, reserved government frequencies, NTC authority for recall after due process with protections for active users and an 18-month non-recall window after award, and PCC notification and competitive analysis for assignment or joint use cases. Certain fixed point-to-point and Wi‑Fi assignments are exempt from several SMPF procedures, subject to DICT guidelines. NTC must issue rules within three months of SMPF effectivity to implement it.

== Transparency, access list, and satellite provisions ==
To institutionalize transparency and arm’s-length conduct, the NTC must publish a registry of participants within three months of IRR effectivity and update it at least annually. It must regularly review, update, and publish the NRFAT and spectrum use information, including band purposes and assignees, within three months of IRR effectivity and biennially or more often when national security, public interest, or international commitments require. Participants must file annual reports with accurate statements of market prices and services, including technical and financial information on investments, rollout reach, and all costs and charges relevant to their segment, and submit rate schedules to both NTC and PCC at least once a year, maintaining a public archive of rates. Access providers are required to grant access to items on the access list on an open, fair, reasonable, and non-discriminatory basis, subject to technical feasibility, with prior consultation before inclusion of their infrastructure or services in the list. The DICT, NTC, and PCC must issue the access list within three months of IRR effectivity and update it as needed. Access providers must publish a Reference Access Offer with comprehensive, modular terms and rates enabling access without further negotiation; those with significant market power must secure NTC approval of the RAO before publication, while others must furnish the NTC a copy. Disputes on access are appealable to the NTC, which must decide within sixty days, and RAOs must be published within sixty days from IRR effectivity.

This Act allows direct access to satellite systems. Duly registered participants may deploy satellite technology and use associated spectrum in any segment of their broadband networks without leasing capacity from public telecommunications entities and without prior DICT authorization for broadband or NTC authorization for broadcast or non-broadband services; however, terms and conditions, including levels of access to any international fixed or mobile satellite system, must be submitted to the appropriate agency for record purposes.

== Performance standards and enforcement ==
Within six months of IRR effectivity, the NTC must publish performance standards for all participants, covering quality-of-service parameters such as speed, packet loss, jitter, and latency. These standards must at least match regional indices and align with international best practices, be reviewed at least annually, and take effect thirty days after publication. The NTC must monitor and measure performance quarterly and publish results on its website; it may engage an independent third-party monitoring firm. Participants must comply within six months of the initial publication of standards, and the NTC may penalize non-compliance after due process and require corrective actions.

== Significance to the Philippines ==
This Act reframes connectivity as essential national infrastructure and a shared responsibility across public and private actors. By embedding open access, infrastructure sharing, spectrum transparency, and measurable performance obligations, it lowers structural barriers to entry, catalyzes investment, and creates clear accountability for service quality. Its coordinated empowerment of DICT policy direction, NTC regulation and enforcement, and PCC competition oversight positions the country to expand inclusive, affordable, and resilient connectivity—especially in unserved and underserved areas—while keeping pace with evolving technologies and global standards.
