= Datang Telecom Technology =

Chinese state-owned security chip and communications company

- company logo and the calligraphy of "Datang Telecom"

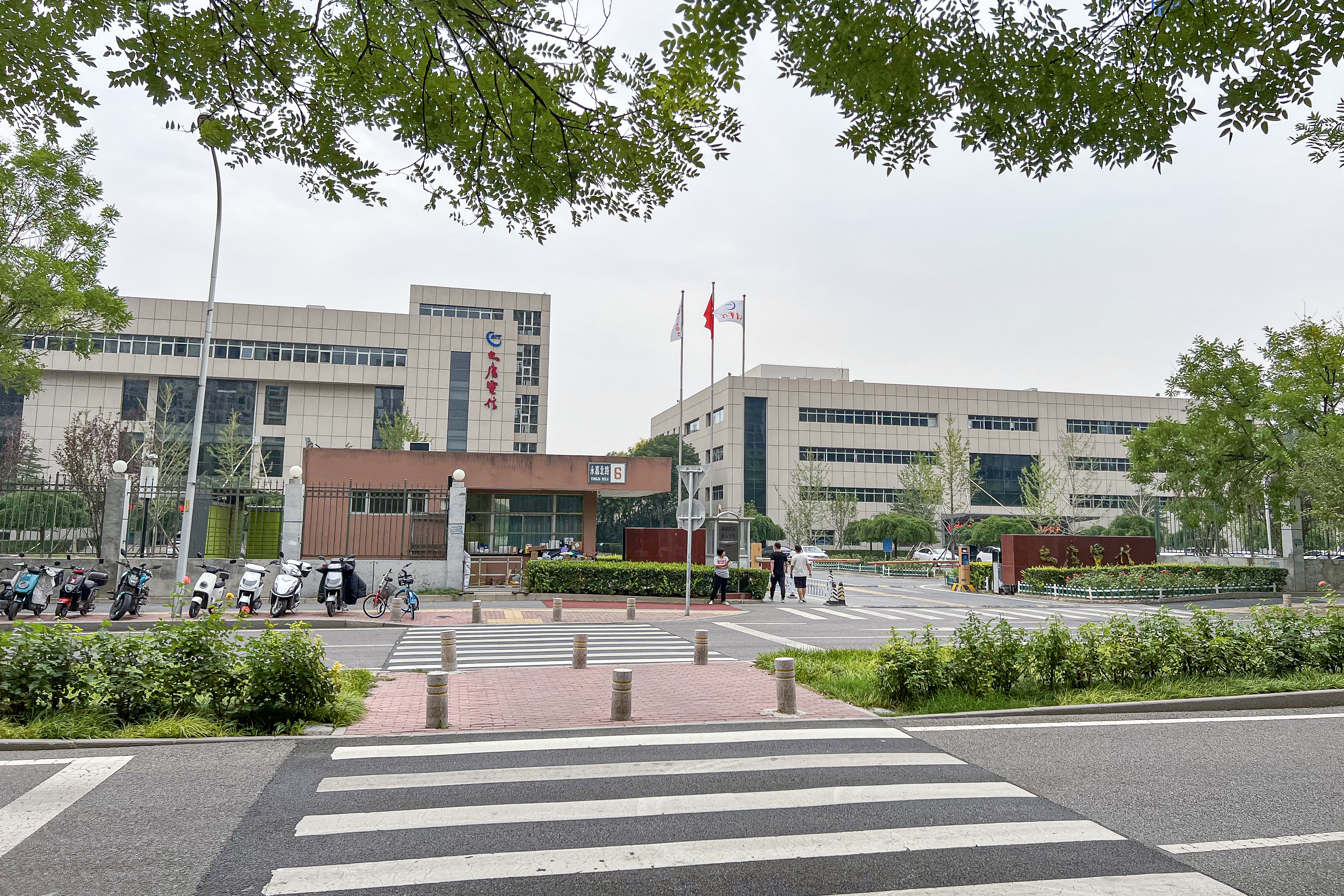
- Headquarters
- Trade name: Datang Telecom
- Type: Public; state-owned enterprise
- Traded as: SSE: 600198
- Industry: Semiconductors, telecommunications equipment
- Predecessor: Divisions of Datang Telecom Group
- Founded: 21 September 1998 (spin off)
- Founder: Datang Telecom Group
- Headquarters: Beijing, China
- Products: Security chips, special-purpose communication systems
- Number of employees: 895 (2024)
Parent
| Datang Telecom Group | (direct) |
| China Information and Communication Technologies Group (CICT) | (intermediate) |
| SASAC | (ultimate) |
- Subsidiaries: Datang Microelectronics Technology
- Website: www.datang.com

Datang Telecom Technology
- Simplified Chinese: 大唐电信科技
Transcriptions

Datang Telecom
- Simplified Chinese: 大唐电信
- Traditional Chinese: 大唐電信
Transcriptions
Standard Mandarin
- Hanyu Pinyin: Dà táng diàn xìn

Datang Telecom Technology Co., Ltd., known as Datang Telecom or DTT, is a Chinese state-owned listed company based in Beijing. Established in 1998 as the listed subsidiary of the China Academy of Telecommunications Technology (CATT, trading as Datang Telecom Group), it was the first Chinese state research institute to be restructured into a publicly listed company. Once a telecommunications equipment maker grouped with Huawei, ZTE and Julong Telecom as one of China's "big four" domestic telecom vendors (the so-called "Ju Da Zhong Hua"), the company suffered prolonged losses following the commercial failure of the TD-SCDMA 3G standard developed by its parent, and repeatedly faced delisting from the Shanghai Stock Exchange.

After a series of divestments and restructurings, its business now centres on security chips and special-purpose communications. Since 2018 its ultimate parent has been the China Information and Communication Technologies Group (CICT), a central state-owned enterprise supervised by SASAC.

== History ==
=== Founding and listing ===
In 1998 the China Academy of Telecommunications Technology, a research institute under the former Ministry of Posts and Telecommunications, was transformed into both a research institute and a holding company by incorporating Datang Telecom Technology on 21 September 1998 under the Companies Law of China, together with thirteen other promoters, in Beijing's Haidian new technology development zone. On 21 October 1998 DTT was listed on the Shanghai Stock Exchange under the stock code 600198. The research institute subsequently adopted the trading name Datang Telecom Group.

=== TD-SCDMA era and first delisting crisis ===
During the 2G and 3G eras Datang Telecom was regarded as one of China's four major domestic telecommunications equipment manufacturers alongside Julong Telecom, ZTE and Huawei, and its corporate group held the intellectual property of TD-SCDMA, one of the three international 3G standards. The standard's limited commercial success weighed heavily on the company: from 2009 onwards its net profit excluding non-recurring items was negative for more than a decade, and between its 1998 listing and late 2020 it accumulated net losses of roughly 5.4 billion yuan.

The company's disclosure record also drew regulatory scrutiny. Its 2004 annual report overstated profit by 37.18 million yuan, prompting investor lawsuits for false statements, and a former director was sanctioned by the China Securities Regulatory Commission for insider trading in one of China's earliest insider-trading civil compensation cases. After consecutive losses in 2005 and 2006, the stock was placed under "ST" special treatment by the Shanghai Stock Exchange from 30 April 2007; the company avoided delisting by returning to profit through asset disposals, and the designation was removed on 5 June 2009.

=== Expansion into chip design ===
In March 2012, Datang Telecom agreed to acquire the TD-SCDMA chip designer Leadcore Technology from its parent group, in a deal that valued a 99.36% stake at 1.627 billion yuan, alongside handset design firm Shanghai Uniscope Technologies and its subsidiary Qidong Uniscope Electronics. Leadcore became the core of the company's integrated circuit design business, providing 3G and 4G mobile terminal chips and solutions.

In May 2017, Leadcore signed an agreement with Qualcomm (China), JAC Capital and Wise Road Capital to establish a Sino-foreign joint venture, JLQ Technology, to design and sell chipsets for mass-market smartphones in China. The venture had a registered capital of 2.98 billion yuan, with Qualcomm and Datang each holding 24%, JAC Capital 34.6% and Wise Road Capital 17.4%, targeting smartphones priced around US$100. The joint venture was approved by Chinese antitrust regulators in 2018.

In July 2018, the company's parent, Datang Telecom Group, was merged with FiberHome Technologies Group to form the China Information and Communication Technologies Group (CICT), a new central state-owned enterprise headquartered in Wuhan with registered capital of 30 billion yuan, which became Datang Telecom Technology's ultimate controlling shareholder.
