= Telecommunications in the Philippines =

Telecommunications in the Philippines are well-developed due to the presence of modern infrastructure facilities. The industry was deregulated in 1995 when President Fidel V. Ramos signed Republic Act No. 7925 (The Public Telecommunications Policy Act of the Philippines). This law opened the sector to more private players and improved the provision of telecom services are better and fairer rates, leading to the creation of many telecommunication service providers for mobile, fixed-line, Internet and other services.

== History ==
=== Pre-reform ===
==== Colonial period ====
Two private companies offered telecom services namely Eastern Extension Australasia and China Telegraph Company which is a subsidiary of Britain's Cable and Wireless. The Spanish authorizes Eastern Extension to construct and operate the first submarine cable linking the Philippines and Hong Kong.

A telephone network was established in Iloilo City in 1894. Jose de Olagier y Feliu requested permission from the Spanish officials in the Philippines in 1892 to operate a telephone network covering the Spanish cities of Iloilo, Jaro, and the town of Molo. Permission was granted for a 10-kilometer (6.2 mi) radius telephone network with bidding for the public works done in Madrid and Manila. By May 1894, all necessary posts and ridges were installed. The telephone network in Iloilo City was operational by June 1, 1894.

The Philippine Islands Telephone and Telegraph Company is American-owned which started operations in 1905 in the present-day Metro Manila. In 1928, merged with Cebu, Panay, and Negros Telephone and Telegraph companies to form the Philippine Long Distance Telephone Company (PLDT). In 1932, the colonial Philippine congress granted PLDT a 50-year franchise to operate a national telephone system.

The establishment of the Public Service Commission to regulate the industry as well as other utilities, meanwhile the Bureau of Posts was created to operate telegraph services nationwide.

==== Post-independence, 1946–1969 ====
Initially, PLDT was managed by Americans, including the American company General Telephone and Electric Corporation (GTE) as a major stockholder. However in March 1967, perhaps in anticipation of the end of "parity rights" by 1974, GTE announced their intent to dispose of their 28% controlling interest in PLDT.

On November 7, 1967, the Philippines Telecommunications Investment Corporation (PTIC) was registered to buy GTE's controlling interest. Ramon Cojuangco, who was part of one of the most influential clans in Philippine history, was a main incorporator. PTIC formally took control of PLDT on January 1, 1968. This led to the takeover of PLDT by the Filipinos, becoming a dominant player in telecommunications because of its authorization to operate a national network. Company officials however dispute that they were a monopoly because of the existence of a government telephone system (Republic Telephone Corporation or simply ReTelCo), and over 60 provincial companies operating in the country. The Bureau of Telecommunications (BuTel) handled the government telephone system, which by 1975 had 34,643 operational telephone lines, or about 10.2% of the total telephone capacity of the country.

There were also four major companies with license for international data communication:

- Eastern Extension, a franchise was transferred to the Eastern Telecommunication Philippine Incorporated (ETPI) in 1974. Eventually, they restructured its ownership, with 60% now owned by Filipino businessmen.
- Globe Mackay Cable and Radio Corporation (GMCR) was established in 1928. It is now majority-owned by the Zóbel de Ayala family, which is one of the oldest and most established elite families in the country, as a joint venture with SingTel.
- Capitol Wireless Inc (Capwire), established in 1962, which is owned by the Santiago family which is also the group which owned Retelco, then-second largest telephone company.
- Philippine Global Communications (Philcom) was established in 1977. During the term of Ferdinand Marcos, he gave Philcom exclusive rights to handle calls to Japan, Australia, Korea, Guam, and Thailand.

==== Paptelco vs. PLDT ====
In 1976, the Philippine Association of Private Telephone Companies was organized to protect the interest of small telephone companies. By 1975, around 60 small telephone companies provided 11.7% of the total telephone capacity at the time. These small companies were dependent on PLDT to place inter-provincial and overseas calls, in which PLDT used this interconnection to their advantage.

PLDT could allow, slow down, or deny interconnection at will. Some companies which found it financially impossible to operate without interconnection sold their companies to PLDT. They also dictated the interconnection access rates, which meant that PLDT cornered most telecommunications revenues. Eventually, by 1991, PLDT had 94% of the total lines.

==== Martial law developments ====
Ferdinand Marcos's Presidential Decree No. 217 in 1973 mandated all PLDT subscribers to invest in PLDT to raise its equity and finance its expansion program. This law, known as the Subscribers Investment Plan (SIP) required all PLDT subscribers to buy non-voting shares in the company. Mandatory investors held about 85% of the total company equity shares but had no actual power in controlling the company.

PLDT also had access to international loans from the World Bank. These loans assisted PLDT's dominance, and PLDT became the single largest private recipient of foreign loans to the Philippines.

In 1981, a National Telecommunications Development Plan was released. A section of the plan recommended the integration of all private telephone companies under one monopoly. Marcos issued a presidential directive to Retelco, PLDT's main competitor in Metro Manila, to merge with PLDT. The merger was met with objection by the owners of Retelco, but the merger was continued because Marcos threatened to withdraw the companies' franchises.

==== Developments under Aquino ====
The Corazon Aquino government's policy was two-pronged: it was to increase public spending in underserved or unserved municipalities, and allow entry of new players. In 1987, the DOTC adopted a series of policies aimed at rationalizing the development of the industry. This led to the reversal of Marcos' push towards the integration of the telecommunications system under a monopoly. It also affirmed that development of the national telcos needs an introduction of competition and regulated entry into the market. During the end of Cory's term however, telecommunications was poor but PLDT prevailed with their tactics in maintaining their monopoly.

=== Reform ===
==== Liberalization ====
Under the Ramos administration, a coalition named the Movement for Reliable and Efficient Phone System (MORE Phones) was formed with the goal of liberalizing the telecommunications industry. Until the mid-1990s, MORE Phones continued to pressure PLDT to be more transparent and accountable. Ricardo Manapat, who wrote about the illegitimate activities of the Marcoses and their cronies, wrote a follow-up report entitled "Wrong Number: the PLDT Telephone Monopoly." The report revealed PLDT's questionable management practices as well as how the Cojuangco family controlled the company, despite owning only 1.6% of the total stock.

As a countermeasure against PLDT's earlier attempts at refusing interconnection with its competitors, President Ramos signed an Executive Order 59 on 24 February 1993. EO 59 required interconnection among all authorized telecommunications companies, in order for subscribers on one operator to reach the subscribers of another. In the Senate, anti-monopoly bills were filed in the House of Representatives and it was reported that PLDT was the main target of these bills. The Congress had already approved nine telecom franchise, their applications pending at the NTC for provisional authority to operate international, cellular, or value-added services. This also led to the Congress controlling who could obtain a franchise. But PLDT would successfully block new entrants to the industry by filing various legal challenges.

In 1994, the NTC and several other industry players devised the Service Area Scheme (SAS) This scheme was in response to imbalanced demand of telecom companies in urban areas over rural areas.The SAS attempted to allow companies to earn profits but also ensure that part of those profits would be channeled to serve less profitable areas. Companies were allocated both profitable and unprofitable areas to ensure operational viability and the provision of rural telephony.

==== Prominent industry players ====
===== Globe Telecom =====
Globe Telecom (Globe) is a joint venture between Ayala Corporation and Singapore Telecommunications Limited (SingTel). Globe was the first foreign company to be granted entry into the Philippine's liberalized market. In 1994, Globe launched its digital cellular services, pioneering the use of Global System for Mobile Communications Technology (GSM). In fact, Globe popularized the short messaging service (SMS) through adding it for free with their basic services.

When the 1997 Asian financial crisis stuck, there were two consolidations that happened in the industry. In June 2001, the Globe-Islacom merger was completed. This merger resulted to providing improved services and a wider coverage for the two companies’ subscribers.

===== Smart Communications =====
Smart Communications (Smart) was the first company to enter the liberalised market. In September 1999, PLDT purchased Smart Communications absorbing it as a 100-percent owned subsidiary. Smart was financially supported by First Pacific. This partnership resulted in the rapid construction of Smart's network and more importantly, the subsidization of handsets. Smart was also authorized to offer both international gateway and cellular telephone services. At the end of 2005, Smart became the largest cellular operator in the Philippines with over 15.4 million subscribers.

===== Dito Telecommunity =====
Dito Telecommunity (Dito), formerly known as Mindanao Islamic Telephone Company, Inc. (Mislatel), is a consortium of Davao businessman Dennis Uy's Udenna Corporation (through its subsidiary Dito CME Holdings Corporation) and Chinese state-owned China Telecommunications Corporation, a parent company of China Telecom. As the third player, it began its commercial operations on March 8, 2021. As of February 2023, Dito's total mobile subscriber base reached 13.1 million.

== Facts and figures ==
=== Telephones ===
Telephones – main lines in use
6.782 million (2011)
- 9 international gateways; satellite earth stations – 3 Intelsat (1 Indian Ocean and 2 Pacific Ocean); submarine cables to Hong Kong, Guam, Singapore, Taiwan, and Japan

- Globe Telecom is now challenging PLDT in both the fixed and wireless markets.
- However, the fixed line market in the Philippines remains underdeveloped.

=== Mobile ===
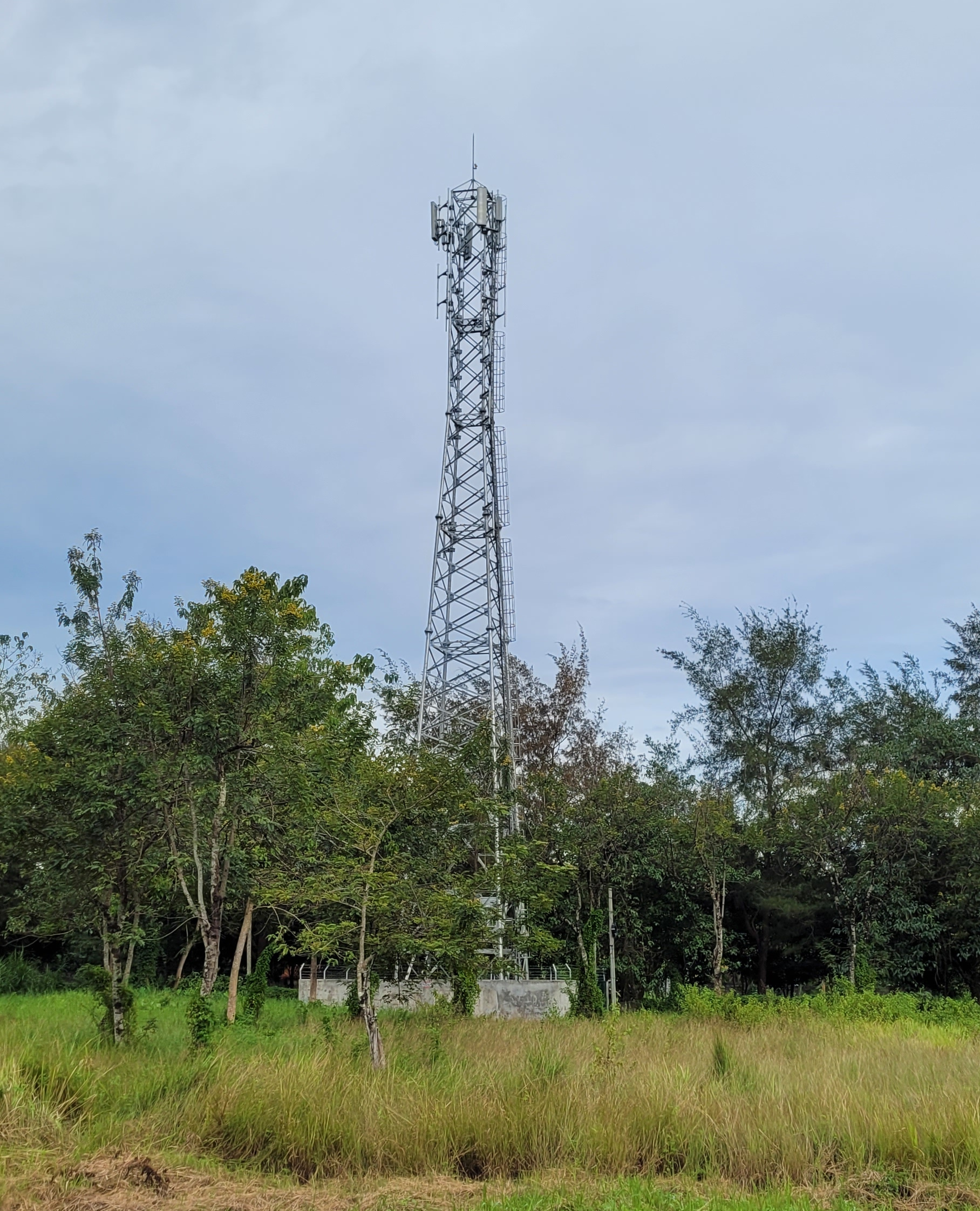
A DITO Telecommunity cell site tower in Bukidnon

SIMs in use (registered)
105.9 million (2023)

==== Mobile prefixes used ====
Mobile Numbers are coded base on network providers ranging from 0813 to 0999, and international code for Philippines replace the zero to make an international call to the Philippines that would make it +63813 to +63999.

==== Mobile market ====
Considered one of the most profitable industries, telecoms have emerged in the country due to it becoming a necessity and its product life cycle. The mobile market of the Philippines has been run by the duopoly of Smart together with Globe Telecom. The two companies have a very tight hold on the industry but they continue to fight for more subscribers and they are in a race to introduce new services. However, both still lost subscribers during 2017 as the market went through consolidation.

Although based in the Philippines, there was alleged foreign ownership in PLDT (76%) and Globe (73%)—resulting a duopoly in the telecom industry. As alleged by the journalist Rigoberto Tiglao, Anthony Salim is the biggest controlling stockholder of PLDT through Hong Kong based First Pacific Company Limited, which led him to establish and expand in the Philippines as a conglomerate. This however is countered by legal disclosures of PLDT which as of June 30, 2025 details foreign ownership to 11.21% if only counting voting common shares, and maximum of 20.40% if also including voting preferred shares.

It was expected that for 2018-2013 the growth of mobile subscribers would be low due to a highly mature and highly competitive market. There will be a movement from 4G to 5G services for faster browsing.

The mobile average revenue per user (ARPU) levels have been decreasing in the Philippines due to the visible competition in the mobile industry. In order to grab market share, aggressive price competition is done by these operators. There has been a drastic increase in mobile broadband penetration, as well as an increase of wireless broadband users over the past five years. It is predicted that over the next five years will have a strong growth. On the other hand, it could decline and slow down as the market matures. Currently, the Philippines is preparing from the move from 4G to 5G. A “5G technolab” is currently in the works in PLDT. Meanwhile, Globe Telecom announced its plans to release 5G within the middle of 2019.

==== SMS ====
SMS services are very common in the Philippines, from news briefs to multimedia services. Cellular mobile services began in the country only in 1991. In May 2000, the number of cellular phone subscribers exceeded the number of fixed line subscribers. This is because of the spotty telephone service and high cost of fixed line subscriptions. It was also seen how SMS is affordable. This led to the Philippines has become the global capital of text messaging, which was a feature of the mobile phone that was ignored by other countries. Meanwhile, in 2001, the popularity of the text messaging in the Philippines has created a subculture called Generation Txt, where teenagers and young mobile professionals have developed their own language in text.

Civilian logistical communication through SMS was an important part of the EDSA II revolt in 2001 that overthrew the government of President Joseph Estrada.

=== Radio ===
Radio broadcast stations
AM 369, FM 583, shortwave 5 (2003)

==== Radios ====
11.5 million (1997)

=== Television ===
3.7 billion (2018)
233 + 1373 CATV networks

=== Internet ===
In the Philippines, there is barely any growth in the fixed broadband market. This is because most Filipinos use mobile phones and very few have fixed lines (landlines). Mobile broadband use is more popular in the country and fixed broadband penetration in the Philippines is still low. Since market leader PLDT is now offering fibre-based services and will soon be introducing hybrid technology such as G.fast, it is pushing its competitors like Globe Telecom to match them. In general, Internet service in the Philippines is still too unaffordable for majority of the population. The prices are declining but the market continues to struggle against low entry level packages.

From being the "texting capital of the world," the Philippines has one of the heaviest social media usage globally. The average Filipino spends around 4 hours on social media. Despite most Filipinos wanting to be connected, the Akamai Q3 2016 report states that the Philippines ironically has the second slowest fixed line broadband Internet speed in the world.

Based on this Q2 2017 report by Akamai, the Philippines' average internet speed (IPV4) was a lowly 5.5 Mbps, which was below the global average of 7.2 Mbps during the time of the study. Ookla, the company behind the popular internet speed testing service Speedtest, shows that the country's average fixed broadband and mobile speeds as of June 2018 sits at 17.9 Mbps and 13.7 Mbps respectively.

==== List of Internet Service Providers (ISPs) in the Philippines ====
As of June 2021

- InfiniVAN Inc.
- Converge ICT Solutions
- Sky Cable Corporation
- PLDT
- Globe Telecom
- Dito Telecommunity
- RISE
- Net 1
- PT&T
- DCTV Cable Network
- Now Telecom
- Eastern Communications
- Streamtech (formerly Planet Cable)
- Royal Cable
- Radius Telecoms
- Parasat Cable Television
- Asian Vision
- Horizon Gateway Corporation
- Kabayan Broadband

Internet users
76 million (2018)
Country code (Top level domain)

.ph

== Government laws affecting telecommunications ==
- August 10, 1963: Republic Act No. 3846, An act providing for the regulation of radio stations and radio communications in the Philippine Islands, and for other purposes.
- December 21, 1989: Republic Act No. 6849, An act providing for the installation, operation and maintenance of public telephones in each and every municipality in the Philippines, appropriating funds therefor and for other purposes.
- March 1, 1995: Republic Act No. 7925, An act to promote and govern the development of Philippine telecommunications and the delivery of public telecommunications services.
- May 23, 2016: Republic Act No. 10844, An act creating the Department of Information and Communications Technology (DICT), defining its powers and functions appropriating funds thereof, and for other purposes.

=== Telecommunications regulatory environment in the Philippines ===
LIRNEasia's Telecommunications Regulatory Environment (TRE) index, which summarizes stakeholders' perception on certain TRE dimensions, provides insight into how conducive the environment is for further development and progress. The most recent survey was conducted in July 2008 in eight Asian countries, including Bangladesh, India, Indonesia, Sri Lanka, Maldives, Pakistan, Thailand, and the Philippines. The tool measured seven dimensions: i) market entry; ii) access to scarce resources; iii) interconnection; iv) tariff regulation; v) anti-competitive practices; and vi) universal services; vii) quality of service, for the fixed, mobile and broadband sectors.

The prominent companies providing telecommunication services are Philippine Long Distance Telephone (PLDT) and Globe Telecom (Globe). The two aforementioned companies are the leading players in the industry, causing a duopoly. The Filipinos continually pay expensive prices for slow internet without the presence of a third player. The dismay in the Internet and Communications Technology (ICT) of the Philippines can be seen simply through their pricing points and comparing that to the neighboring countries in South East Asia.

In 2016, an Australian telecommunications company called Telstra was having talks with San Miguel Corporation (SMC) to enter the Philippine market as the third player. However, Telstra did not push through. The Australian company did not give any explicit reason for their repudiation. However, some analysts would assume that Telstra was turned off with the pricing battle caused by the duopoly.
The “Konektadong Pinoy” bill lapsed into law in 2025, aiming to liberalize the telecom market, encourage competition, and make internet access more affordable.

== Importance of telecommunications to the Philippines ==
A lot of Filipinos work outside of their country and they keep contact with their families back home using calling cards to the Philippines because those are cheaper than direct calling. According to the TNS Digital Life Study of 2012, about 81% of urban Filipinos use the internet to keep in touch with their relatives abroad. 90% of overseas Filipino workers (OFWs) belong to social media networking sites such as Facebook wherein they. Some people use e-mail or instant messaging, but the preferred method is still the phone. The use of a mobile phone for offers the cheapest way overseas Filipino workers (OFW) to send money or remittances to their families back in the Philippines.

Furthermore, in a study done in 2015 by the US-based Pew Research Center, 88% of Filipinos consider the internet good for education. The survey also notes that 76% of Filipinos see the internet as good for the maintenance of personal relationships. 73% believe that the internet is good for the economy, especially with the boom of online or electronic commerce.

Apart from that, telecommunications is used in the Philippine establishments. According to the 2015 Survey on Information and Communication Technology, 61.9% of establishments have local area network (LAN). 13.7% of establishments utilize the internet for their business. This includes e-commerce. 17.6% of establishments conduct business transactions using the mobile phone.

== Telco tower operators ==
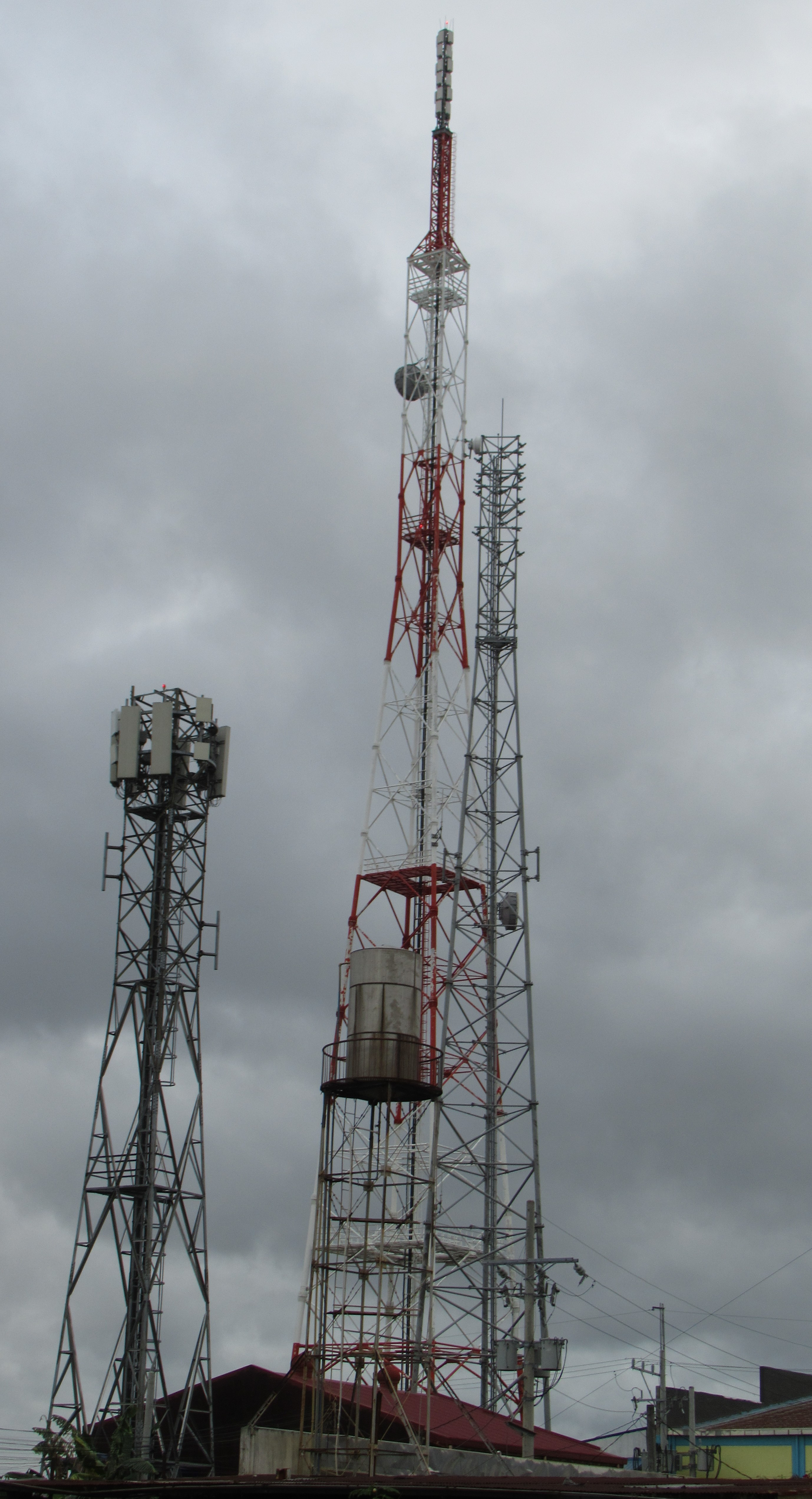
Cell site towers in Guiguinto, Bulacan

Common towers or cell sites that allow co-sharing arrangements between separate telecommunications services is currently being rolled out across the Philippines. The policy for common towers is meant to encourage a rise in investment activities and broad market-led development on the part of ICT providers.

Presently, there are over 20 tower companies with licenses to operate but only six of these companies as having the capabilities, wherewithal, and customer support to secure meaningful build-to-suit (BTS) commitments from mobile network operators for new sites.

- Pinnacle Towers (KKR)
- MIDC - PhilTower (Stonepeak, Macquarie Capital and MIESCOR)
- edotco Group (Axiata)
- EdgePoint Infrastructure (DigitalBridge)
- Unity (Aboitiz Group)
- LBS Digital Infrastructure

== See also ==
- 2018 Philippine third telecommunications provider bidding
- National Telecommunications Commission
- Konektadong Pinoy Act
- SIM Registration Act
- Internet in the Philippines
