= EasyCall =

Philippine telecommunications company

- Company type: Public
- Traded as: PSE: ECP
- Industry: Telecommunications
- Founded: September 25, 1989
- Services: Pager-related services (until 2002); Contact center outsourcing; Information technology services; Broadband internet
- Parent: Transnational Diversified Group
- Website: easycall.com.ph

EasyCall Communications Philippines, Inc. (ECP), or simply known as EasyCall, is a telecommunications company most noted for its paging services in the Philippines in the 1990s. It ended paging services in 2002, shifting to other telecommunications services.

== History ==
=== Pager era ===
It was established on September 25, 1989, as the Francisco N. Cervantes, Inc.. The company went public in 1992 and was listed in the Philippine Stock Exchange. It also changed its name to its current name, EasyCall.

Its main competition was PocketBell. Both EasyCall and PocketBell claimed 50 to 60 market share of the Philippines' paging industry. EasyCall's paging services covered the entire Philippines. At its peak, EasyCall operated 16 paging sites across the Philippines which has the capacity to cater to 300,000 subscribers.

=== Phaseout of paging services and diversification ===
EasyCall ended its paging services in 2002 due to introduction and growing adoption of short messaging service through mobile phones in the late 1990s. It ended its provincial paging services (except Cebu) in March 2002, and its Metro Manila and Cebu operations in November 2002. Its subscribers were absorbed by Island Country Telecommunications which operates the paging service named Jaspage. It shifted to engaging in contact center outsourcing and other information technology businesses. It started its outsourcing business in 1999 and added information technology to its line of services in 2000. It also began offering broadband services in 2015.

In 2001, it was acquired by the Transnational Diversified Group.
