= Philippine Research, Education, and Government Information Network =

National level research and education network established in the Philippines

Philippine Research, Education, and Government Information Network (PREGINET)
- Formation: 1998
- Location: Diliman, Quezon City
- Parent organization: Advanced Science and Technology Institute, Department of Science and Technology
- Website: DOST-ASTI PREGINET

The Philippine Research, Education, and Government Information Network (PREGINET) is a national research and education network established in the Philippines by the Advanced Science and Technology Institute of the Department of Science and Technology (DOST-ASTI). The network provides interconnect between research and higher education institutions in the Philippines, and to other international research networks within the Asia Pacific region. PREGINET also manages the PHOpenIX, the only neutral Internet exchange in the Philippines, allowing neutral peering between local Internet service providers and other commercial institutions.
