= Judicial review in the Philippines =

As early as 1936, the Philippine Supreme Court had unequivocally asserted its constitutional authority to engage in judicial review. This power was affirmed in the Supreme Court decision in Angara v. Electoral Commission, 63 Phil. 139 (1936). Nonetheless, the Supreme Court would, in the next several decades, often decline to exercise judicial review by invoking the political question doctrine. In 1987, the constitutional convention formed to draft a new charter decided to provide for a definition of "judicial power" as a means of inhibiting the Supreme Court from frequently resorting to the political question doctrine. Hence, Section 1, Article VIII of the 1987 Constitution states in part that: Judicial power includes the duty of courts of justice to settle actual controversies involving rights which are legally demandable and enforceable, and to determine whether or not there has been a grave abuse of discretion amounting to lack or excess of jurisdiction on the part of any branch or instrumentality of the government. See also:
