= FiberHome =

Chinese netwoking and telecommunications company

FiberHome Telecommunication Technologies Co., Ltd.
- Type: Public
- Traded as: SSE: 600498
- Industry: Telecommunication
- Predecessor: Wuhan Research Institute of Posts & Telecommunications
- Founded: 1999
- Headquarters: Wuhan, People's Republic of China
- Number of employees: over 22,000 (2013)
- Website: www.fiberhome.com

FiberHome Telecommunication Technologies Co., Ltd. (Chinese: 烽火通信科技股份有限公司; pinyin: Fēnghuǒ Tōngxìn Kējì Gǔfèn Yǒuxiàn Gōngsī) is a networking and telecommunication equipment provider in the People's Republic of China. Its headquarters is in Hongshan District, Wuhan, Hubei province, China. Founded in 1999, FiberHome Networks was one of the 8 affiliated companies and highly specializing on IP networks under the management of FiberHome Company.

In July 2018 FiberHome Technologies Group merged with Datang Telecom Group to form China Information and Communication Technologies Group, which has its headquarters in Wuhan. FiberHome and Datang Telecom became subsidiaries of the new group.

In May 2020, the U.S. Commerce Department's Bureau of Industry and Security said it was adding FiberHome to its Entity List of organizations subject to Export Administration Regulations governing exports and other transactions.

FiberHome Technologies Group and a subsidiary, Nanjing FiberHome Starrysky Communication Development, were complicit in alleged human rights abuses involving Muslim minority groups in the Xinjiang Uighur Autonomous Region (XUAR) in northwest China. U.S. companies will have to obtain special, hard-to-get licenses to do business with FiberHome.
