= Philippine Internet Exchange =

Philippine Internet eXchange
- Full name: Philippine Internet eXchange
- Abbreviation: PhIX
- Founded: 2006
- Location: Philippines
- Website: Official website

Philippine Internet eXchange (PhIX) is the first Internet Exchange Point in the Philippines.

It is a joint project of Philippine Internet service providers (ISPs) to interconnect through a common backbone or Internet Exchange Point (IX) for efficient infrastructure.

As of 2010 it was interconnecting eight (8) ISPs namely: Pacific Internet, Tridel, Evoserve, WorldTel, Moscom, IPhil, Infocom and Virtualink. G-Net, Globe Telecom’s ISP, was in the process of joining the Philippine Internet eXchange.

== History ==
The idea to connect all the ISPs in the Philippines was first suggested in mid-1995 during the Internet Society (ISOC)-sponsored Internet Workshop held in Hawaii. Uniting competing ISPs posed a difficulty even though the benefits of an IX were obvious.

In August 1995, exploratory discussions started within PLDT on the setting-up of the infrastructure for an Internet hub. In May 1996 it was decided to proceed with the network access point project, called Philippine Internet eXchange (PhIX). PhIX pilot operations started in January 1997.

On 29 October 1996, PLDT formally presented its PhIX project to the 15 local ISPs which have their own gateway connections to other countries. Of the 15 ISPs who attended PLDT's presentation, the 5 largest ISPs signified their intention to join the PhIX project by signing the Multi-Lateral Peering Agreement on 19 November 1996, namely: Infocom, IPhil, Moscom, Virtualink and WorldTel Phil.

The pilot operation of the PhIX was started in January 1997 and was completed in June 1997, and since then the 5 pioneering ISPs have successfully been exchanging Philippine-Centric New World Hotel on July 3, 1997 which is when PHIX was formally launched.

== Objectives ==
- To improve the efficiency of internet routing in the Philippines.
- To enhance the overall quality and reliability of Philippine Internet services.
- To maximize existing and future bandwidth capacities of ISPs in the Philippines
- To reduce the size of the routing tables worldwide.
- To create a truly Philippine-centric Internet.

== Updates ==
=== G-Net to Join PhIX ===
Globe Telecom’s ISP, G-Net, is in the process of joining the Philippine Internet eXchange. Globe Telecom is a member of the Ayala Group of companies. G-Net is one of its services.

G-Net would be peering via an E1 connection.

=== Tridel and Moscom Upgrades Bandwidth ===
Member ISPs are seeing the benefit of exchanging local Internet traffic. Due to the increase in usage of the Philippine Internet eXchange service, Tridel Technologies upgraded its bandwidth to 512 kbit/s from a 64 kbit/s leased line.

Meanwhile, Moscom Internet is in the process of upgrading its connection to E1.

== See also ==
- List of Internet exchange points
