= Datang Telecom Group =

Chinese state-owned telecommunications equipment company

China Academy of Telecommunications Technology
- Calligraphy of "Datang Telecom" (first row) and the Chinese text of Datang Telecom Technology & Industry Group (second row)

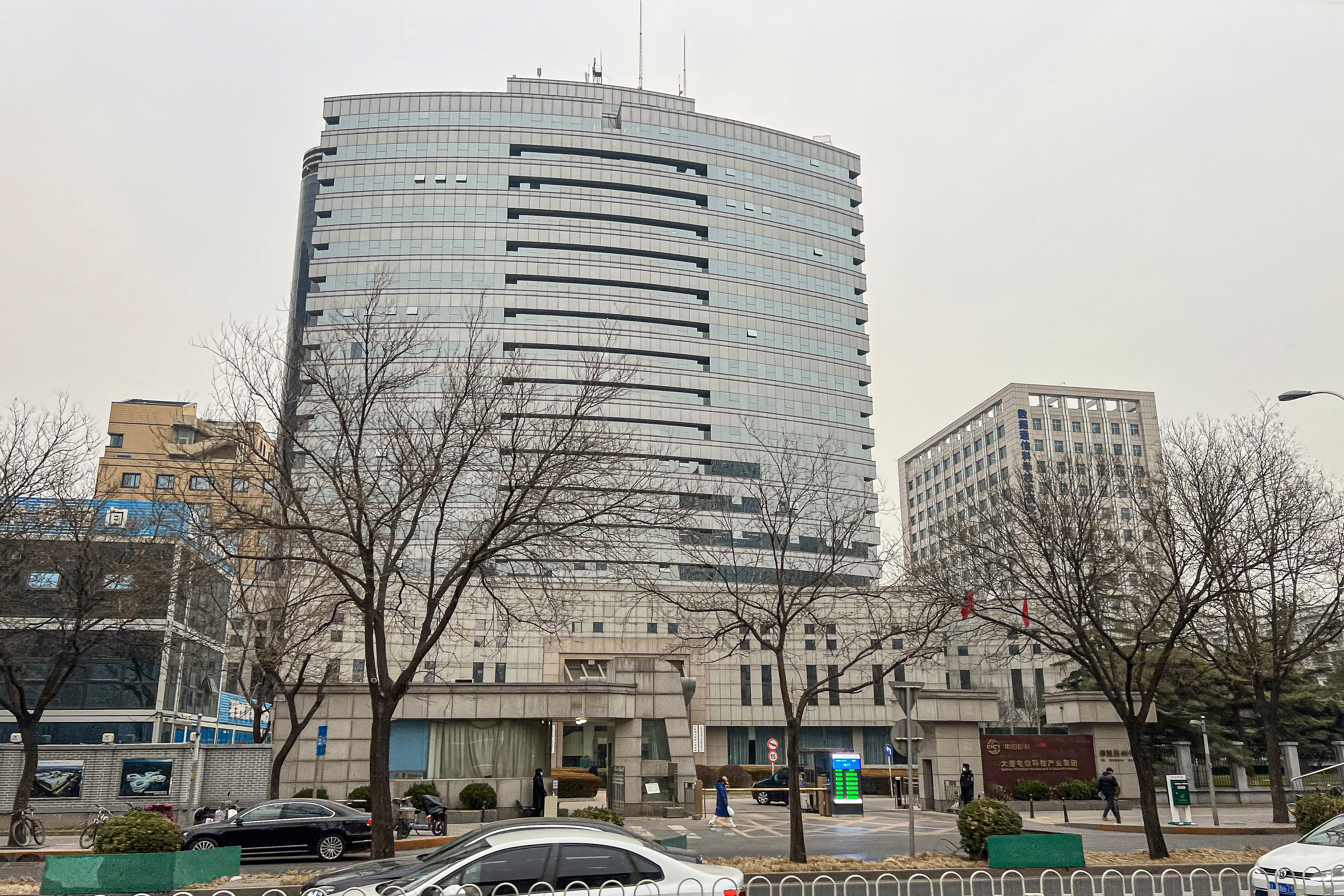
- Headquarters
- Trade name: Datang Telecom Technology & Industry Group
- Type: State-owned enterprise
- Industry: Telecommunications equipment
- Founded: 1957; 69 years ago
- Headquarters: 40 Xueyuan Rd, Haidian District, Beijing, China
- Area served: China, exported worldwide
- Products: Microelectronics, Software, Communication Access, Communication Terminals, Communication Application and Service
- Owner: Chinese Central Government
- Subsidiaries: Datang Telecom Technology; DT Mobile
- Website: www.datanggroup.cn

China Academy of Telecommunications Technology
- Simplified Chinese: 电信科学技术研究院
Transcriptions

Datang Telecom Technology & Industry Group
- Simplified Chinese: 大唐电信科技产业集团
Transcriptions

Datang Telecom
- Simplified Chinese: 大唐电信
- Traditional Chinese: 大唐電信
Transcriptions
Standard Mandarin
- Hanyu Pinyin: Dà táng diàn xìn

Datang Telecom Group (officially Datang Telecom Technology & Industry Group) is a Chinese state-owned telecommunications equipment group headquartered in Beijing, China.

It is best known for its leading role in developing the Chinese TD-SCDMA 3G mobile telecommunications standard through its subsidiary DT Mobile (formerly known as Datang Mobile). Datang Telecom Group sells equipment to Chinese mobile network operators and also provides military communications infrastructure to the People's Liberation Army.

== History ==
Datang Telecom Group was founded on September 21, 1998, by the China Academy of Telecommunications Technology (CATT) and manufactures telecommunications equipment. It has been the trading name of the China Academy of Telecommunications Technology since September 1998. The academy itself was founded in 1957. In 1998 a limited company Datang Telecom Technology was also incorporated and floated in the Shanghai Stock Exchange on 21 October 1998.

In April 2007, Datang secured a 36.6% share of China Mobile's first large-scale TD-SCDMA network construction contracts.

In March 2012, Datang Telecom agreed to acquire three companies: TD-SCDMA chipmaker Leadcore Technology, handset design and manufacturing company Shanghai Uniscope Technologies, and its subsidiary Qidong Uniscope Electronics; Datang already held a 51 percent stake in Shanghai Uniscope.

== Operations ==
Datang's business areas include high-capacity digital switching, optical networking, data communication, and digital microwave communication equipment and software and system integration services. However, revenue from these sectors is far outweighed by the company's spending on TD-SCDMA research and product development, and in recent years the company has taken out a series of heavy loans from state-owned Chinese banks to fund this development.

In 2012, the United States–China Economic and Security Review Commission released a report alleging connections between Datang and the People's Liberation Army, in particular via Datang's Tenth Research Institute in Xi'an.

== Subsidiaries ==
As of 31 December 2015

- The First Research Institute of Telecommunications Technology (100.0%)
- Datang Telecom Technology (33.94%)
