= Magna Carta for Philippine Internet Freedom =

2016 proposed legislative bill

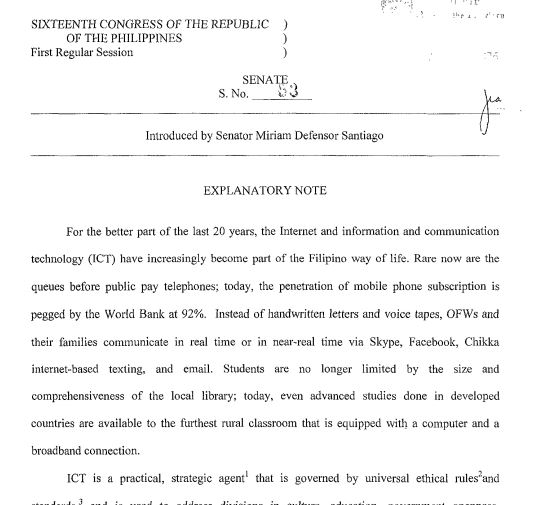
- Long title: An Act Establishing a Magna Carta for Philippine Internet Freedom, Cybercrime Prevention and Law Enforcement, Cyberdefense and National Cybersecurity
- Bill citation: Senate Bill No. 53, Senate Bill No. 1091, House Bill No. 1086
- Introduced by: Senator Miriam Defensor Santiago, Senator Paolo Benigno "Bam" Aquino IV, Representative Kimi Cojuangco

The Magna Carta for Philippine Internet Freedom (abbreviated as MCPIF, or #MCPIF for online usage) is an internet law bill filed in the Congress of the Philippines. The bill contains provisions promoting civil and political rights and Constitutional guarantees for Philippine internet users, such as freedom of expression, as well as provisions on information and communications technology (ICT) policy, ICT4D, internet governance, e-governance, cybersecurity, cyberwarfare, cyberterrorism, and cybercrime.

The Magna Carta for Philippine Internet Freedom was proposed as an alternative to the Cybercrime Prevention Act of 2012 whose enactment was met with mixed reactions. Proponents of the bill claim that the #MCPIF is the first crowdsourced bill in the Philippines.

The bill did not pass when 16th Congress went on sine die May 24, 2016. Harry Roque filed the bill as House Bill No. 0666 during the 17th Congress. The bill also did not pass when the 17th Congress went on sine die on May 27, 2019. No legislator had filed the same on the 18th Congress.

== Cybercrime Prevention Act of 2012 ==
=== Definition, summary, and history ===
The Cybercrime Prevention Act of 2012 (officially filed as Republic Act 10175) is an ICT law that provides legal definitions, provisions, and penalties for offenses ranging from confidentiality, integrity, and availability of computer data and systems such as illegal interference, to content-related acts such as child pornography. President Benigno Aquino III signed the law and was enacted on September 12, 2012.

Online debates and campaigns against the law influx, even making it to social media. The hashtag #NoToCyberCrimeLaw started to trend as common internet users became vocal of their opposition and apprehensions towards the law.

Early in October 2012, several Philippine government websites such as the Official Gazette, the Senate, and even Senator Tito Sotto's website were targeted by members of the Anonymous hacktivist group from various regions of the world as the Cybercrime Prevention Act took effect. The group launched the operation #OpPhilippines where there was distributed denial of service (DDOS) on these sites, making them inaccessible. A YouTube clip was also released by Anonymous, airing its vocal statement of being against the anti-cybercrime law that ends the freedom of expression of Filipinos.

A total of 15 petitions has been filed against the Cybercrime Law at the Supreme Court. On October 9, 2012, the high tribunal of the Supreme Court has issued a temporary restraining order (TRO) on the Cybercrime Prevention Act of 2012. The TRO initially suspended the entire law for a period of 120 days, but the Court later decided to extend the TRO indefinitely while the justices were working the case.

On May 24, 2013, The Department of Justice announced that the contentious online libel provisions of the law were being pushed to be dropped alongside other pending revisions as it awaited the Supreme Court's ruling on its legality.

=== Precedents to the anti-cybercrime law ===
==== Electronic Commerce Act of 2000 ====
Prior to this law, the Electronic Commerce Act of 2000 (RA 8792) was enacted to acknowledge that aside from the Article II, Section 24 of the 1987 Philippine Constitution providing that, "The State recognizes the vital role of communication and information in nation-building," information and communications technology was emphasized as an up-to-date addition in the Section 2 of the act which declares,"The State recognizes the vital role of information and communications technology (ICT) in nation-building; the need to create an information-friendly environment which supports and ensures the availability, diversity and affordability of ICT products and services..."

There were 4 punishable acts in the law: hacking, introducing viruses to destroy data, pirating intellectual data, and violating The Consumer Act of the Philippines (RA 7394) through electronic messages.

==== Consumer Act of the Philippines ====
The law was designed to prevent businesses from engaging in fraudulent or specified 'unfair' practices where they gain unwarranted advantage over competitors through the means of deceptive advertising, selling counterfeit products, and the like.

The Consumer Act also provided a set of regulated standards for production, distribution, trade, and promotion applicable to traditional media, which can be accessible online.

==== Anti-Child Pornography Act of 2009 ====
The Anti-Child Pornography Act of 2009 (RA 9775) was also a relevant precedent to the law as it was integrated in it to provide a more outlined definition of actions that will be punishable by law. Section 52 of the MCPIF places limits on certain types of speech “inimical to the public interest” where child pornography is filed under.

RA 9775 contains provisions protecting the right to privacy of the child through non-disclosure of his/her identity as well as duties and responsibilities of individuals and groups.

Those applicable under the MCPIF state that internet service providers (ISP) are responsible for notifying the Philippine National Police (PNP) or the National Bureau of Investigation (NBI) of any form of activities related or containing child pornography, preserve the evidence for investigation and prosecution purposes, furnish particulars of users who have accesses or attempted to access the content, and ensure access of said content is blocked or filtered. Internet content hosts are also given similar duties.

===== People vs. Luisa Pineda =====
The Supreme Court of the Philippines in a judgment by Justice Mario Lopez in G.R. No. 262941 (People v. Luisa Pineda, February, 2024) affirmed the lower courts' rulings that found Luisa Pineda guilty of violating the Anti-Child Pornography Act of 2009 and the Cybercrime Prevention Act of 2012 qualified with the use of a computer system (violation of Sections 4(a), (b), and (c) of Republic Act No. (RA) 9775 or the Anti-Child Pornography Act of 2009, in relation to Section 4(c)(2) of RA 10175 or the Cybercrime Prevention Act of 2012). Pineda was thus sentenced to suffer the penalty of imprisonment of reclusion perpetua, a fine of PHP 2,000,000 and PHP 300,000 in civil damages.

=== Limitations, criticisms, and need for a magna carta ===
The Cybercrime Prevention Act of 2012 was condemned as a threat to freedom of expression on the internet, the media, and online privacy by common netizens and hacktivist groups such as Anonymous. It has also been compared to the Marcos Martial Law era by human rights groups, media freedom advocates, and internet users.. Kabataan Representative Raymond Palatino branded the legislation as ‘e-Martial Law’ as it can lead to censorship and harassment of the media. Prior to its enactment, 15 Supreme Court appeal petitions were lodged against the Law.

Critics such as student protesters associated the law to the anti-piracy law of the United States that had recently failed the previous year. The failed laws includes the Stop Online Piracy Act (SOPA) and the Protect IP Act (PIPA) that aims to give the US government and copyright holders the access to ‘rogue’ websites. Similarly, many Filipino netizens from university students to journalists protested against the law on social media by changing their profile images into a black picture on Facebook, Twitter, and other social media platforms.

These critics do agree that the law would empower the government to suppress cybercrime offenders such as hackers, data thieves, and cybersex offenders. The law was also further criticized of imposing limitations on freedom of expression and freedom of the press, directly violating Article III, Section 4 of the 1987 Philippine Constitution, through the inclusion of online libel as a crime in the passed law. This includes any person who criticizes other persons such as politicians, actors and actresses, and other people online in the forms of posting in social media site such as Facebook or blogs, and the like. The law also included a provision giving the act of online libel a punishment of one degree higher than libel in any other traditional media, making imprisonment for offenders to 12 years compared to the 6 years for libel in traditional media platforms. Online news organization are also susceptible.

== Background ==
=== Miriam Defensor-Santiago ===
Miriam Defensor-Santiago served as senator of the Philippines from 1995 to 2001 and again from 2004 to 2016. She was serving her third term when she filed a bill to repose the Cybercrime Prevention Act on November 12, 2012. It was dubbed as “Anti-Cybercrime Law version 2.0.”

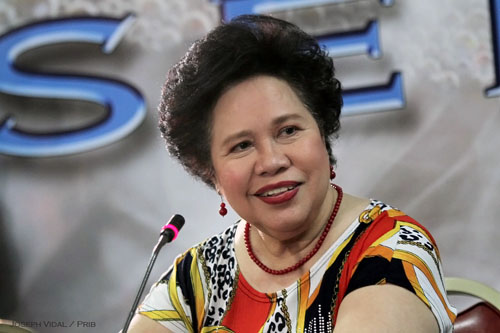
Santiago in 2012.

Santiago argued that the Cybercrime Law was unconstitutional due to its vagueness that could be abused to harm netizens. She further claimed that the law violates the right to privacy and protection against illegal searches.

To resolve this, Santiago envisioned a new bill, the Magna Carta for Philippine Internet Freedom, to define and penalize cybercrime through backing from crowdsourcing of netizens. She claims the MCPIF will protect the rights and freedom of expression of the netizens since the proposed bill does not give the government too much power unlike the Cybercrime Prevention Act. Furthermore, it ensures that the government maintains development accordingly to information technology's advancement.

With the MCPIF, Santiago became the first senator who has passed a law that was “crowdsourced” through discussion in social media such as Facebook, Twitter, and e-mail.

=== Process ===
In response to the signing into law by President Benigno S. Aquino III of Republic Act No. 10175, a group of Filipino lawyers, bloggers, technology experts, and human rights advocates called Democracy.Net.PH spearheaded a crowdsourcing initiative towards the drafting of a law intended to replace it. The proposed Magna Carta for Philippine Internet Freedom was then filed as Senate Bill No. 3327 by Senator Miriam Defensor-Santiago on November 12, 2012. The bill remained pending in committee until the 15th Congress adjourned on June 6, 2013.

In the 16th Congress, Senator Santiago re-filed the Magna Carta for Philippine Internet Freedom in the Senate as Senate Bill No. 53 on July 1, 2013. On July 4, 2013, Representative Kimi Cojuangco of the 5th District of Pangasinan filed a counterpart bill in the House of Representatives as House Bill No. 1086. The bill has passed first reading in both chambers of the Philippine legislature.

On July 24, 2013, Senator Paolo Benigno "Bam" Aquino IV filed a version of the #MCPIF, "enhanced with a 'Free WiFi' provision" as Senate Bill No. 1091.

In the Philippine Congress, the crowdsourced bill the first reading in both chambers. MCPIF is based on 4 main points: rights, governance, development, and security. In March 2014, Pierre Tito Galla headed the Senate opening statement and supported its structure, which gave specific details on internet censorship, data discrimination, data privacy, data security, information security, net neutrality, and freedom of information, e-governance, and due process on punishments. The bill has a total of 10 parts and 85 sections, thereby emulating a bill of rights for the Filipino internet users.

The MCPIF calls to repeal the Cybercrime Prevention Act and create an Office of Cybercrime within the Department of Justice to enforce this law.

=== Contentions and support from external parties ===
Journalists see the MCPIF as a mirror to the Magna Carta for Journalists Bill (HB 2550), which is condemned by media groups such as the National Union of Journalists of the Philippines (NUJP). HB 2550 is unable to protect the lives, welfare, and safety of journalists due to the limitations in its provisions. It is also used as a tool to over-regulate the media.

The International Federation of Journalists (IFJ) was also against the MCPIF, saying that it is far less useful than the pending Freedom of Information bill (FOI). According to the organization, "If politicians in the Philippines truly want to emulate the Magna Carta then they should focus more on the public’s right to know by passing the long-delayed Freedom of Information Bill and other measures that allow media keep their communities informed".

Other online groups such as Democracy.Net.PH has actively voiced out the need for MCPIF's approval as it claims that it believes that MCDPIF is the cornerstone towards "progressive legislation on Philippine cyberspace and the information and communications technology (ICT) sector" as it urges more legislators to continue in pushing the bill. The ProPinoy Project also voices out that the MCPIF is an avenue to exercise democracy as it takes account for the people's rights and wants.

There have also been notable individuals who have posted online and created a stir what netizens would think and feel on certain issues. For this M.R.J. Marisigan's blog, the author commends MCPIF but notes holes such as the covering of cyberbullying is not afforded to those beyond elementary as they do not fall under the Anti-Child Bullying Law, "Thus the MCPIF in decriminalizing libel would strip protection and deterrence against such kinds of occurrences."

=== Gaps addressed by the MCPIF ===
The late Senator Miriam Defensor-Santiago, the proposer of the MCPIF, pointed out the gaps the new bill addresses in juxtaposition with the Cybercime Prevention Act as it upholds the freedom of expression of Filipino netizens and protects them justly in a press release.

Santiago further states the limitations of RA 10175 as it "violates the right to privacy and the Constitutional guarantee against illegal search and seizure through allowing the warrant-less real-time collection of traffic data. In contrast, the MCPIF ensures due process by providing strict guidelines for any collection of any data, including the securing of warrants, obligating notification, and limiting seizure to data and excluding physical property."

Santiago and other supporters claim that there is a dangerous 'takedown' clause of RA 10175 where the government has the authority to have a website or network blocked or restricted without due process of law which is absent in the MCPIF. "My bill specifically provides for court proceedings in cases where websites or networks are to be taken down, and prohibits censorship of content without a court order," said Santiago.

The MCPIF also prohibits double jeopardy where RA 10175 otherwise allows it through prosecution of offenses committed against its provisions and prosecution of offenses committed against the Revised Penal Code and special laws, even though the offenses are from a single act. The efforts of the government to decriminalize libel is aided with libel now considered as a civil liability rather than a criminal act bearing a penalty one degree higher than that of the Revised Penal Code.

The MCPIF clarifies not just cybercrime law itself, but also its enforcement through the proposed Department of Information and Communications Technology (DICT). The DICT is prepared alongside law enforcement agencies, and the military with provisions for handling cybercrimes such as amendments to the AFP Modernization Act that ensure ample weapons and defenses against cyberattacks by terrorists, violent non-state actors, and rogue or enemy nation-states and mandates on the Philippine National Police and the National Bureau of Investigation to combat cyberterrorism.

Santiago also stated that the bill generally enables the Philippines to develop nationally alongside the realities and advances in ICT by harnessing its potential through ensuring government agencies and its laws move accordingly to the growth.

== Provisions ==
=== Part 1 “General Provisions” ===
Contains the policy framework of the Magna Carta for Philippine Internet Freedom

Section 1 contains the formal name of the Magna Carta.

Section 2 shows that the content of the Magna Carta still falls under the Philippine Constitution and briefly discusses the purposes that the state expects information and communications technology in the Philippines will serve. These include: government transparency and public participation in government activities; information propagation for the improvement of life; and the creation of art and development of culture. It also touches on the internet's capability to affect international relations and the State's recognition of its role to make sure internet use still complies with these relations.

=== Part 2 “Definition of Terms” ===
Contains one section stating that, when possible, definitions of terms used in the bill shall be adopted from those established by the International Telecommunication Union, the Internet Engineering Task Force, the World Wide Web Consortium, the Internet Corporation for Assigned Names and Numbers, and other relevant worldwide organizations. It then goes on to list more than 63 terms relevant to the Magna Carta.

=== Part 3 “Internet Rights and Freedoms” ===
Codifies a Bill of Rights for Filipino internet users. This also discusses the securities afforded to them under State jurisdiction.

Sections 4 to 7 talk about individual rights regarding the internet and electronic devices.

Sections 4 and 5 discuss the rights to freedom of speech and usage, and universal access to the internet. They also discuss bans on internet censorship and data discrimination.

Section 6 talks about the right to control access to devices under one's ownership, while Section 7 looks into freedom of creativity on the Internet.

Sections 8 to 13 discuss security.

Sections 8 and 9 promote data privacy, data security, and information security mostly for individual use, while 10 to 12 discuss security in terms of a more public realm, touching on intellectual property and net neutrality.

Section 13 highlights the use of the Internet in government transparency and freedom of information. Due process clauses are included in these provisions.

=== Part 4 “The Department of Information and Communications Technology” ===
Establishes an executive department for purposes of Philippine information and communications technology policy, ICT4D, internet governance, and e-governance. This part also discusses other offices that assist this department with its responsibilities.

Sections 14 to 19 focus on the department itself, discussing its objectives, powers, composition, the responsibility of its head and the department's capability of putting up regional offices.

Section 20 seeks to ensure that the department keeps its performance in check by submitting a periodic performance review.

Sections 21 to 27 introduce other organizations that aid the department in carrying out its duty which include: the Council of Chief Information Officers; the National Telecommunication Commission; the National Data Privacy Commission; the ICT Legal Affairs Office; the Telecommunications Office; the National Information and Communications Technology Institute; and the Official Gazette.

Section 28 seeks to assure that the reorganization of the government to accommodate these groups is under Constitution.

Sections 29 to 32 detail the manner of organization of the personnel under the department.

=== Part 5 “Regulations for the Promotion of Internet Rights and Freedoms” ===
Reiterates the compliance of the Philippines to treaties and international conventions to which it is a signatory, defines duties of state agencies and instrumentalities, provides amendments of existing telecommunications, intellectual property, data privacy, and e-commerce laws, and provides explicitly for the repeal of the Cybercrime Prevention Act of 2012.

Section 33 declares the Magna Carta's compliance with international treaties and conventions.

Section 34 declares the state as the primary duty-bearer with regard to Philippine Internet regulation, and lists the duties regarding this in

Section 35. These duties include: cybercrime law enforcement; cyberdefense and national cybersecurity; the development of skills, resources and technology for ICT technology; education related to ICT; and intellectual property rights in cyberspace.

Sections Section 36 to 42 discuss the changes made to the Constitution to accommodate the Magna Carta. These include amendments to: the Public Telecommunications Policy Act of the Philippines; the Intellectual Property Code of the Philippines; the E-Commerce Act; and the Data Privacy Act Section: The final section calls for the repeal of the Cybercrime Prevention Act.

=== Part 8 “Penalties” ===
Parts 6, 7, and 8 define Philippine cybercrimes and penalties, competent law enforcement agencies, special cybercrime courts and their jurisdictions, and cybersecurity and counter-cyberterrorism policy. Child pornography, child abuse, hate speech, cyberespionage, cyberterrorism, terrorism financing, trafficking in persons, child prostitution, phishing, cybersquatting, and intellectual property infringement are among the crimes defined. Crimes committed against critical infrastructure are provided a higher class of penalties. Double jeopardy is forbidden explicitly in Section 64 of the Magna Carta for Philippine Internet Freedom.

=== Part 10 “Final Provisions” ===
Detail the implementation of the Magna Carta for Philippine Internet Freedom and provide the final provisions for putting it into effect.

Part 9 itself focuses on the implementation. This covers implementation of the Magna Carta for cybercrime law enforcement, ICT education, ICT research and development, and rules and regulations for periodically reviewing the implementation.

Part 10 details the concrete instructions to the government for starting the implementation of the Magna Carta, such as appointing a head and preparing initial funding. This part also includes clauses for the Magna Carta's separability from the rest of the Constitution, the repealing of unmentioned laws inconsistent to it and the start of its effectivity.

== Implications and application ==
=== On crowdsourcing ===
As one of the first crowdsourced bills in the country following the Crowdsourcing Act of 2012, the Magna Carta for Philippine Internet Freedom has been perceived as a success by various civil states in terms of participative democracy, as mentioned in the 2013 Internet Governance Forum in Bali, an annual forum dedicated to delegates from participating United Nations countries that serves as an avenue to discuss the current state, effects, and legal practices of new media. In addition, the European Citizen Action Service (ECAS)’s 2016 report mentions the MCPIF as one of its models towards the creation of a crowdsourcing policy framework in the EU, along with other crowdsourcing initiatives of other countries. In one of the case studies performed by the organization, it listed down some of the implications that the crafting of the MCPIF has cultivated. According to the organization’s report, it has “enhanced the citizens’ participation in policy-making, engaged youth, ensured a learning process, ensured innovative ideas for policy-making based on the wisdom of the crowd. increased political trust, and kept the citizens’ faith in the crowdsourcing method to enhance democracy". However, no concrete statistical evidence supports that the bill increased representativeness in the national level.

=== On libel ===
With its implementation, Miriam Defensor-Santiago considers RA 3327 as an initial step to decriminalize certain forms of libel. As a response to a number of suggested amendments to the former Cybercrime Prevention Act which seeks to pin down criminal activities on the internet, the bill was crafted to protect online users' freedom of expression contrary to RA 10175 which, according to legislators and non-government organizations, restraints online rights and sends a "chilling effect" to consumers of new media. While the bill does not exempt libelous statements made online from criminal liabilities, it exempts public airing of grievances from being held liable. Statements of dissatisfaction directed to public officials, consumer products, and online remarks meant for private and peer reviews are not subject to criminal liabilities, as well as statements of protests that concern public interest. Under the proposed bill, satire will be protected, and truth will be considered as a defense against libel.

=== A better future for internet in the Philippines ===
Given its wide acknowledgment from various organizations, legislators, and states, the hopes and expectations for the MCPIF are high. As of 2013, 37% of the population gains daily online access. As this number continues to grow, repercussions resulting from various online behaviors will continue to increase as well, and Philippine legislators will have to boost policies and laws to address the effects of the internet to the population. With the MCPIF and its four pillars namely rights, governance, development, and security at hand, the Philippines can expect a more stable future in terms of the consumption of new media. With its implementation, online consumers can expect a guarantee in both their online and offline rights. The MCPIF also promises a more open governance especially in ICT-related policies, a more sustained development towards ICT as a vessel towards a more progressive economy, and lastly, a more solidified security system that protects its citizens from outside threats on the internet.
