= Now Telecom =

Telecommunications company in the Philippines

NOW Telecom
- Formerly: Satellite Paging Systems Philippines (1992–2000); Next Mobile Incorporated (2000); Infocom Communications Network (2000–2013)
- Type: Subsidiary
- Industry: Telecommunications
- Founded: 26 March 1992; 34 years ago
- Headquarters: NOW Bldg., España Blvd., Sampaloc, Manila, Metro Manila, Philippines
- Area served: Philippines
- Key people: Mel Velarde (Chairman); Engr. Rene L. Rosales (President)
- Services: Broadband internet; Fiber-optic communication; Call and Text messaging services, Mobile internet
- Owner: Now Corporation (30%); Minorities and other stakeholders (70%)
- Website: www.now-telecom.com

Now Telecom Company, Inc. (stylized as NOW Telecom) is a telecommunications firm based in the Philippines. The company provides broadband and fiber-optic communication services to upper-class residential and commercial areas in Metro Manila under the Now Fiber Air brand. The firm, along with Now Corporation (Now Corp) and News and Entertainment Network Corporation (NEWSNET), formed the unified Now Network service.

== History ==
Now Telecom was founded on March 26, 1992, as Satellite Paging Systems Philippines when the congress granted a franchise to operate radio paging. Its franchise was later amended on March 1, 1995. The company began operating as Next Mobile Incorporated (NMI/Next Mobile), and since then, has under the ownership of the Velarde Group headed by former Sky Cable's executive Mel Velarde.

In 2005, a partial stake in NMI was acquired by Cashrounds, which Velarde took over the ownership of the company's shareholding stake. The following year, Cashrounds changed its corporate name to Information Capital Technology Ventures, Inc. (ICTV). NMI received a provisional authority license to operate cellular mobile telephony services (CMTS), but had never obtained any cellular frequencies.

In 2013, ICTV was officially renamed as Now Corporation (Now Corp). Infocom would later adapt the parent firm's operations under the Now Telecom brand, replacing Next Mobile.

In 2018, Now Telecom's parent Now Corp decided not to submit the bid for the country's third telecommunications provider, but the congressional franchise of the firm was renewed on the same year.

In 2019, Now Corp inked a joint partnership with South Korean telecommunications firm SK Telecom for the rollout of Now Telecom's 5G broadband services and becoming the fourth major telecommunications player in the Philippines.

On October 2, 2020, NOW Corporation inked a joint partnership with Viettel. On December 1, 2020, NOW Corporation inked a joint partnership with Finnish multinational telecommunication Nokia for the rollout of Now telecom's 5G broadband services.

On December 16, 2022, The US Trade and Development Agency secured grant funding for the 5G project. On January 13, 2023, The US Trade and Development Agency and Now Telecom sealed an agreement by the US government to deploy nationwide standalone 5G mobile and fixed wireless network in the Philippines. The company will begin its commercial network in 2024.

On March 10, 2024, the Supreme Court rejected its application to become a third major telco player.

=== Provisional authority as mobile operator ===
On September 14, 2020, the National Telecommunications Commission (NTC) granted Now Telecom a provisional authority and a cellular mobile telephone service license (which is on par with the major mobile network operators in the Philippines, Smart, Globe, and Dito), with the company claiming that with this, they are now to operate as the "fourth major telecommunications provider" in the country. However, the officials of both the NTC and the Department of Information and Communications Technology (DICT) disputed the statement by Now for being another player, argued that they are not a "4th major player" yet and they do not have enough frequencies to compete with the major players. Although NTC Deputy Commissioner Edgardo Cabarios confirmed that Now is given a license to operate as a mobile network, he insisted that there are other players in the market and the country has 3 major players only (referring to Smart, Globe and Dito), while the DICT Secretary Gregorio Honasan repeated the statement, added that there are other 40 small players in the industry. Former DICT officer-in-charge Eliseo Rio Jr. accused Now Corporation for their claim to boost their public stock.

In February 2021, the Philippine Stock Exchange (PSE) penalized Now Corporation for misleading the public investors for labeling their own communications arm as a major player with the PSE added that Now Telecom had no "sufficient basis" when it declared itself as a fourth major player. Now Telecom maintains the claim that they are indeed a 4th major telecommunications player.

On March 1, 2021, The Anti-Red Tape Authority (ARTA) ordered the National Telecommunications Commission (NTC) to approve the much-delayed assignment of frequencies the company needs for the rollout of 5G technology in the country. It directed the NTC to issue the provisional authority and the concomitant frequencies sought by Its company.

On February 3, 2022, The company received a favorable decision on an Omnibus Order from the Anti-Red Tape Authority (ARTA) for its nationwide cellular mobile service. ARTA affirmed with finality its earlier resolution approving Now Telecom's assign of 220 MHz of radio frequencies namely, 1970 MHz-1980 MHz paired with 2160 MHz to 2170 MHz and 3.6 GHz to 3.8 GHz, including 5G frequencies for mobile and fixed wireless. On March 31, 2022, ARTA in a resolution denied the motion for reconsiderations filed by NTC and DITO Telecommunications and the Anti-Red Tape Authority (ARTA) affirmed its decision order the National Telecommunication Communications to extend the permit on Now Telecom.

On April 4, 2025, the NTC revoked Now Telecom's operating license, citing failure to comply with critical regulatory and operational requirements and the firm owing P3.57 billion in unpaid regulatory fees.

=== Fourth telco player ===
On September 29, 2023, NTC renewed the license to operate as one of the four mobile providers in the country which awarded the 800 megahertz (MHz) band. The company received the permit on October 2, 2023. It is also planning to appeal for reconsideration to get the mobile frequencies needed to operate using 1970 megahertz (MHz) to 1980 MHz paired with 2160 MHz to 2170 MHz and 3.6 gigahertz (GHz) to 3.8 GHz ranges.

In April 2024, The High Tribunal's Second Division, in a 44-page judgment penned by Marvic Leonen, dismissed the petitions filed by Now Telecom (Next Mobile Incorporated), Bayan Telecommunications, Multi-Media Telephony Incorporated, and AZ Communications Incorporated versus National Telecommunications Commission decisions which disqualified them for a 3G radio frequency service.

== Ownership ==
Now Corporation owns the majority stake at 30% in Now Telecom.
