= Eliseo Rio Jr. =

Filipino retired brigadier general and electronics engineer

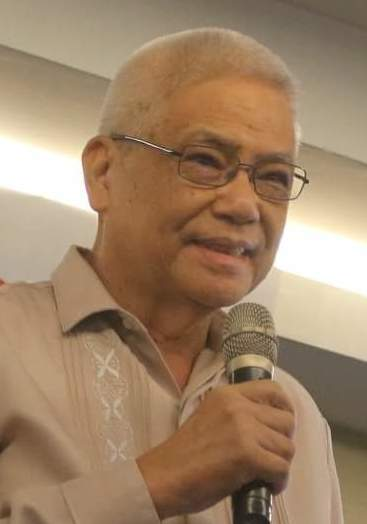
- Rio in March 2018

Undersecretary of Information and Communications Technology for Operations
- In office July 1, 2019 – February 3, 2020
- President: Rodrigo Duterte
- Preceded by: Position established
- Succeeded by: Ramon Jacinto

Secretary of Information and Communications Technology Officer-in-charge
- In office October 10, 2017 – July 1, 2019
- President: Rodrigo Duterte
- Preceded by: Rodolfo Salalima
- Succeeded by: Gregorio Honasan

Commissioner of National Telecommunications Commission
- In office February 26, 2001 – October 8, 2002
- President: Gloria Macapagal Arroyo
- Preceded by: Agustin Bengzon (acting)
- Succeeded by: Armi Jane Borje

Personal details
- Born: Eliseo Mijares Rio Jr. October 27, 1944 (age 81) Tapaz, Capiz, Commonwealth of the Philippines
- Spouse: Rosalinda P. Rio
- Children: Ma. Estela, Eliselinda, & Eliseo III
- Occupation: Engineer, soldier (brigadier general)
- Profession: Electronics engineer

Eliseo Mijares Rio Jr. (born October 27, 1944) is a Filipino retired brigadier general and electronics engineer who is the former Undersecretary for Operations of the Philippines' Department of Information and Communications Technology and once headed the department under the Duterte administration from 2017 to 2019 as Officer-in-charge.

== Early life and education ==
Eliseo Rio Jr. was born on October 27, 1944, in Tapaz, Capiz. He is the son of Estela Mijares and Col. Eliseo D. Rio, Sr., a Filipino soldier and author.

Rio completed an electronics and communication engineering course at the University of the East in 1966 and electrical engineering at the University of the Philippines in 1967. In 1969, he completed a company officer course at the Philippine Army School Center. During the 1970s to the 1980s, he completed several military courses at various schools and locations. He was one of the top notchers (4th place) in the Electronics Engineer (ECE) Licensure Examination conducted in 1971. He then completed an electronic industries course at Ateneo de Manila University in April 1983.

== Career ==
Rio's career started in the military. He was employed mostly by government but also held positions in telecommunication companies.

=== Government ===
From September 1968 to April 1969, Rio held various positions in the Armed Forces of the Philippines Research and Development Center. In October 1969, he was assigned to Communication Company, 4th Infantry Division, in Mindanao. He was an instructor at the Philippine Military Academy in Baguio from 1971 to 1974. From 1975 to 1982, he was part of then-President Ferdinand Marcos' classified project called Project Santa Barbara as head of its Electronics Division. The project's aim was primarily to develop different types of missiles with the purpose of guarding and defending the country. After that, he was appointed assistant general manager of Gasifier and Equipment Manufacturing Corporation (GEMCOR), a company under the Ministry of Public Works and Highways. He was again reassigned as head of the AFP Research and Development Center Communication-Electronics R&D Group from February 1985 to May 1988. He was the group commander of Military Intelligence Group 21 and Electronics Technical Intelligence Group of the Intelligence Service, Armed Forces of the Philippines (ISAFP) from 1988 to 1992. From 1992 to 1995, Rio was in Kuala Lumpur, Malaysia, as the Philippine Embassy's Defense and Armed Forces Attaché. He was designated Assistant Chief of Staff for Communication, Electronics and Information System of the Philippine Army from 1995 to 1998. He was appointed Commandant of the Armed Forces of the Philippines Command and General Staff College from February 1998 to June 1999. He was promoted to brigadier general and appointed as Chief of the Armed Forces of the Philippines Communication, Electronics and Information Systems Service (AFPCEISS), from July 1999 to March 2000. From April to October 2000, he was designated Deputy Chief of Staff for Communications, Electronics and Information Systems, Armed Forces of the Philippines (J11). He retired from the armed forces on October 27, 2000.

==== Commissioner of NTC ====
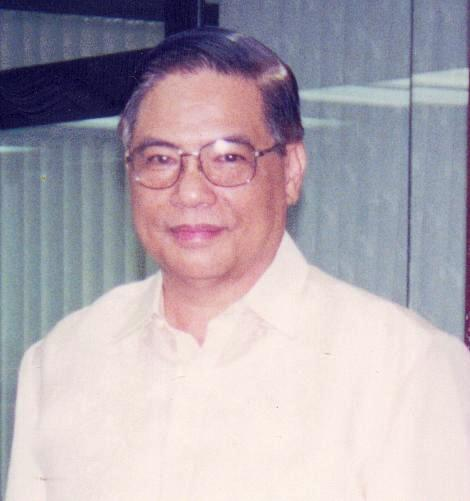
Rio as NTC Commissioner, 2001

Rio was appointed by then-President Gloria Macapagal Arroyo as Commissioner of the National Telecommunications Commission on February 26, 2001, succeeding acting-Commissioner Agustin Bengzon. One of his first official acts was to extend the Provisional Authority of Globe, Smart and other entities from one to three years. During his term, NTC's collection passed the billion pesos mark, almost doubling the commission's average yearly collections since its establishment. In 2002, he enacted NTC Memorandum Circular July 8, 2002: "Rules And Regulations Authorizing Entities Other Than Public Telecommunications Entities To Install And Operate Public Calling Stations/Offices And Telecenters" which paved the way to the proliferation of call centers and business process outsourcing in the country. He finished his term on October 8, 2002, and was succeeded by Armi Jane Borje.

==== Department of Information and Communications Technology ====
Rio was appointed as Undersecretary for Special Concerns of the Department of Information and Communications Technology and was sworn in on September 13, 2016. As undersecretary, he was in charge of the formulation of policies, planning and programming of cybersecurity and emergency communications, the implementation of strategic programs and projects and regional operations. He also held various supervisory roles in agencies like the Cybercrime Investigation Coordination Center, the National Privacy Commission and the Commission on Elections Advisory Council, as well as overseeing duties regarding the participation of the DICT in the activities of the National Disaster Risk Reduction and Management Council. On October 10, 2017, following the resignation of Rodolfo Salalima as DICT Secretary, he was appointed officer-in-charge of the department on the instructions of President Duterte. Rio was then elevated to acting secretary of the department on May 8, 2018. He took his oath of office at the Sandiganbayan on May 11. Plans and programs of the DICT under his leadership were the implementation of policies to increase Internet speed while keeping costs low, improvement of e-governance to reduce queues and lines at government offices, programs such as the Technology for Education, Employment, Entrepreneurs, and Economic Development (Tech4ED) and the development of a high-speed information highway involving Bases Conversion and Development Authority and Facebook.

His term as officer-in-charge of the department ended after former-Senator Gringo Honasan took his oath of office as DICT Secretary on July 1, 2019.

=== Private sector ===
Rio was an independent member of the board of Bayan Telecommunications from November 2004 to January 2006. From February 2006 to January 2007, he was the chairman of the board of NextMobile, formerly Nextel Philippines. From 2007, he was a consultant to Globe and Teodoro N. Romasanta Inc. (TNRI). He was also president of Trufone from March 2014. In August 2016, Rio tendered his resignation as a member of the board of directors of Now Corporation citing "possible conflict of interest" as the reason for resignation.

== Petitions for an investigation of the 2022 Philippine presidential election ==
In the aftermath of the 2022 Philippine presidential election, Rio and two others later submitted petitions to the Supreme Court of the Philippines and the Philippine Commission on Elections itself, to pave the way for an investigation of the results of the election, in order to put to rest lingering doubts about its credibility.

== Awards and citations ==
- Plaque of Appreciation by the University of the East for placing 4th in the first ECE Board Examination, 1971
- Military Commendation Medal - awarded 8 times
- Military Merit Medal - awarded 12 times
- Bronze Cross Medal of Bravery - awarded twice
- Distinguished Service Star - awarded thrice
- Outstanding Achievement Medal by the President of the Philippines
- Presidential Citation for Outstanding Scientific Achievements
- "Best Military Intelligence Group Commander, ISAFP", 1990
- Presidential Citation from President Corazon Aquino for the major role of MIG 21 in effectively neutralizing coups threats and personalities against the government in 1989-90
- "Most Outstanding Professional in the Field of Electronics and Communication for the Year 2002" by the Professional Regulation Commission
- Most Outstanding University of the East Alumnus in the Field of Engineering for the Year 2003

Government offices
Preceded by Agustin Bengzon (acting)	Commissioner of National Telecommunications Commission; 2001–2002	Succeeded by Armi Jane Borje
Preceded by Rodolfo Salalima	Secretary of Information and Communications Technology; Officer in Charge; 2017–2018	Succeeded by Gregorio Honasan
