= Rodolfo Salalima =

Filipino lawyer

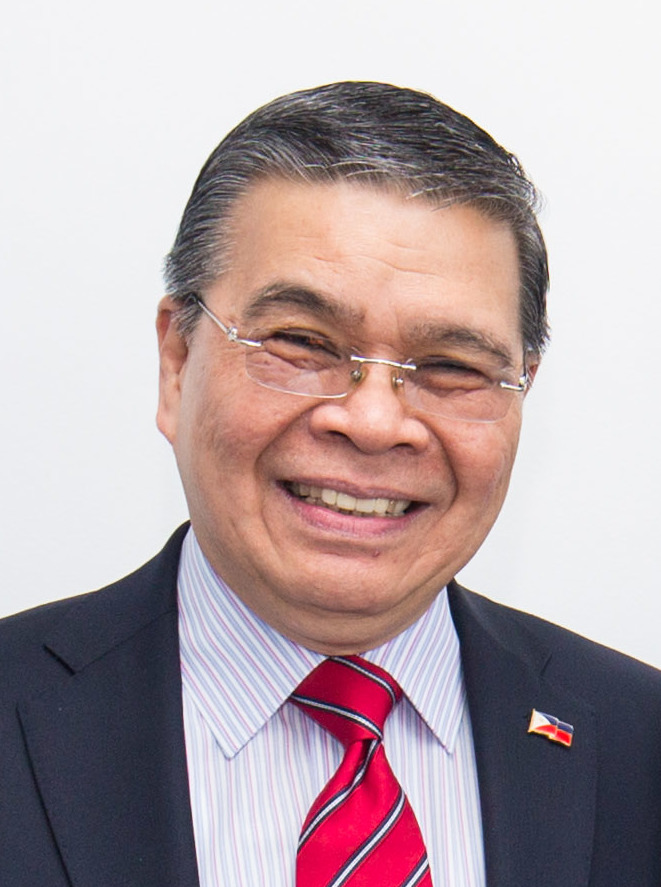
- Salalima in 2017

1st Secretary of Information and Communications Technology
- In office June 30, 2016 – September 22, 2017
- President: Rodrigo Duterte
- Preceded by: Position created
- Succeeded by: Eliseo Rio Jr. (OIC)

Personal details
- Born: Rodolfo Agapay Salalima Polangui, Albay, Philippines
- Education: San Beda College
- Occupation: Lawyer, Business Executive

Rodolfo "Rudy" Agapay Salalima is a Filipino lawyer who was the first secretary of the Philippine Department of Information and Communications Technology (DICT) under the Duterte administration. Salalima is the former chief legal counsel and senior advisor of Globe Telecom, one of the leading telecommunications firms in the country and has also served as Senior Vice President for Corporate and Regulatory Affairs and Managing Director of Ayala Corporation. He is also the former president of the Philippine Chamber of Telecommunications Operators (PCTO) and International Telecommunication Union Council working group for the amendment of ITU constitution and convention vice chairman for Asia Pacific Region.

In 2015, Salalima authored the book entitled "Telecommunications in the Information Revolution", a law book on telecommunication policies in the country.

== Background ==
Salalima is a Bicolano from Polangui, Albay. He was Duterte's former classmate in San Beda College of Law Class of 1971, together with fellow Duterte Cabinet members Vitaliano Aguirre II and Arthur Tugade. He passed the Philippine Bar Examination in 1974.

== Department of Information and Communications Technology ==
Salalima was appointed by President Rodrigo Duterte, became the first secretary of the Department of Information and Communications Technology.

He resigned from the post on September 22, 2017. He cited corruption and interference as his reasons for resigning. Salalima was succeeded by DICT Undersecretary Eliseo Rio Jr. as an officer-in-charge (OIC) of DICT.

Political offices
New office	Secretary of Information and Communications Technology; 2016–2017	Succeeded by Eliseo Rio Jr. Officer-in-charge
