= Ivan John Uy =

Filipino ICT secretary from 2022 to 2025

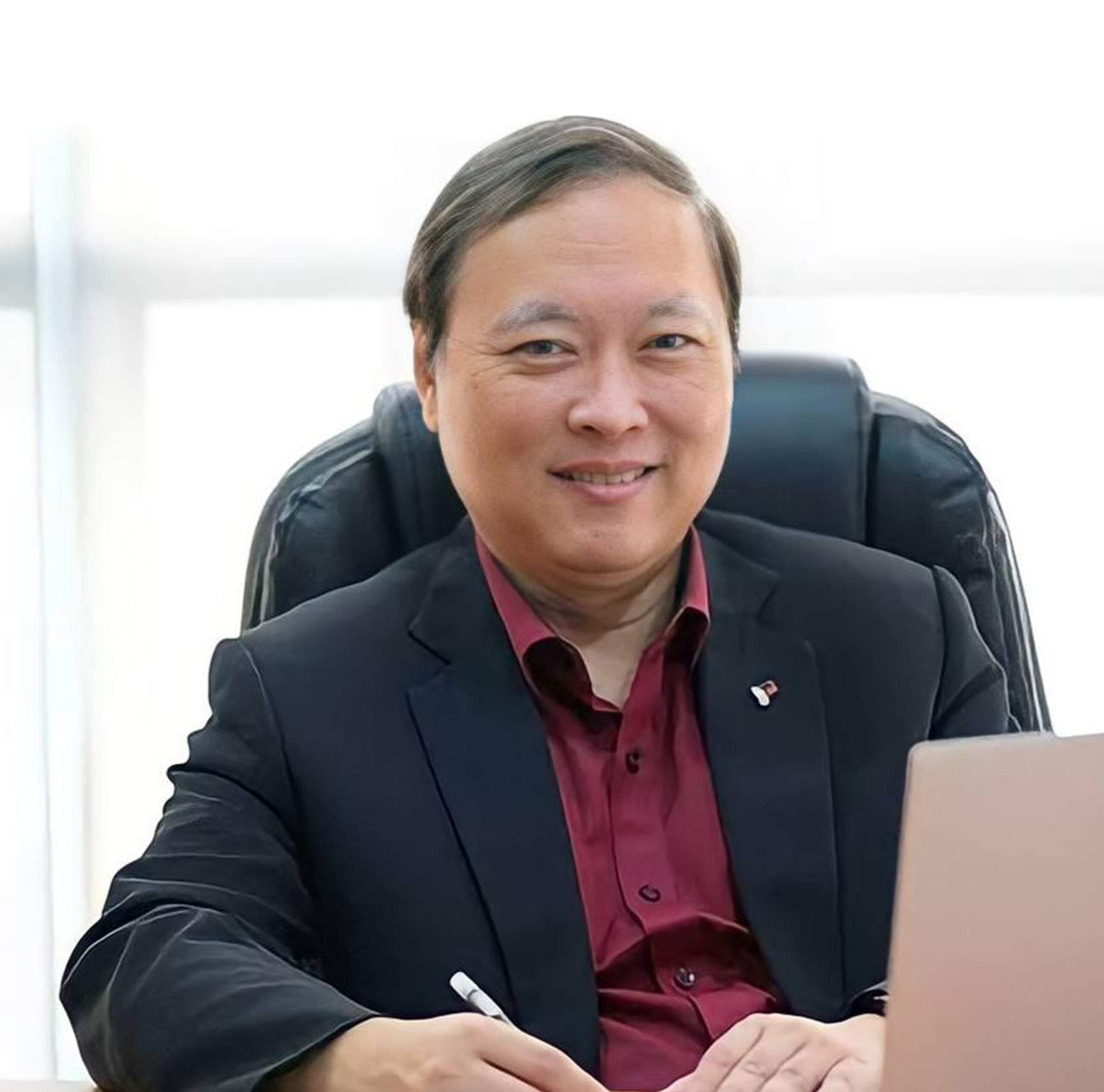
- Uy in 2022

3rd Secretary of Information and Communications Technology
- In office June 30, 2022 – March 6, 2025
- President: Bongbong Marcos
- Preceded by: Emmanuel Rey Caintic (acting)
- Succeeded by: Paul Mercado (OIC)

Personal details
- Born: Ivan John Enrile Uy
- Spouse: Judy Christine Go
- Education: Ateneo de Manila University (B.A.); University of the Philippines College of Law (LL.B)
- Profession: Lawyer

Ivan John Enrile Uy is a Filipino lawyer and government official who last served as the Secretary of the Department of Information and Communications Technology (DICT) from 2022 to 2025.

== Education ==
Uy attended the Ateneo de Manila University where he gained his bachelor's degree then went to University of the Philippines College of Law where he obtained a law degree in 1988. As of 2022, he is also a Humphrey fellow of the University of Minnesota in the United States.

== Career ==
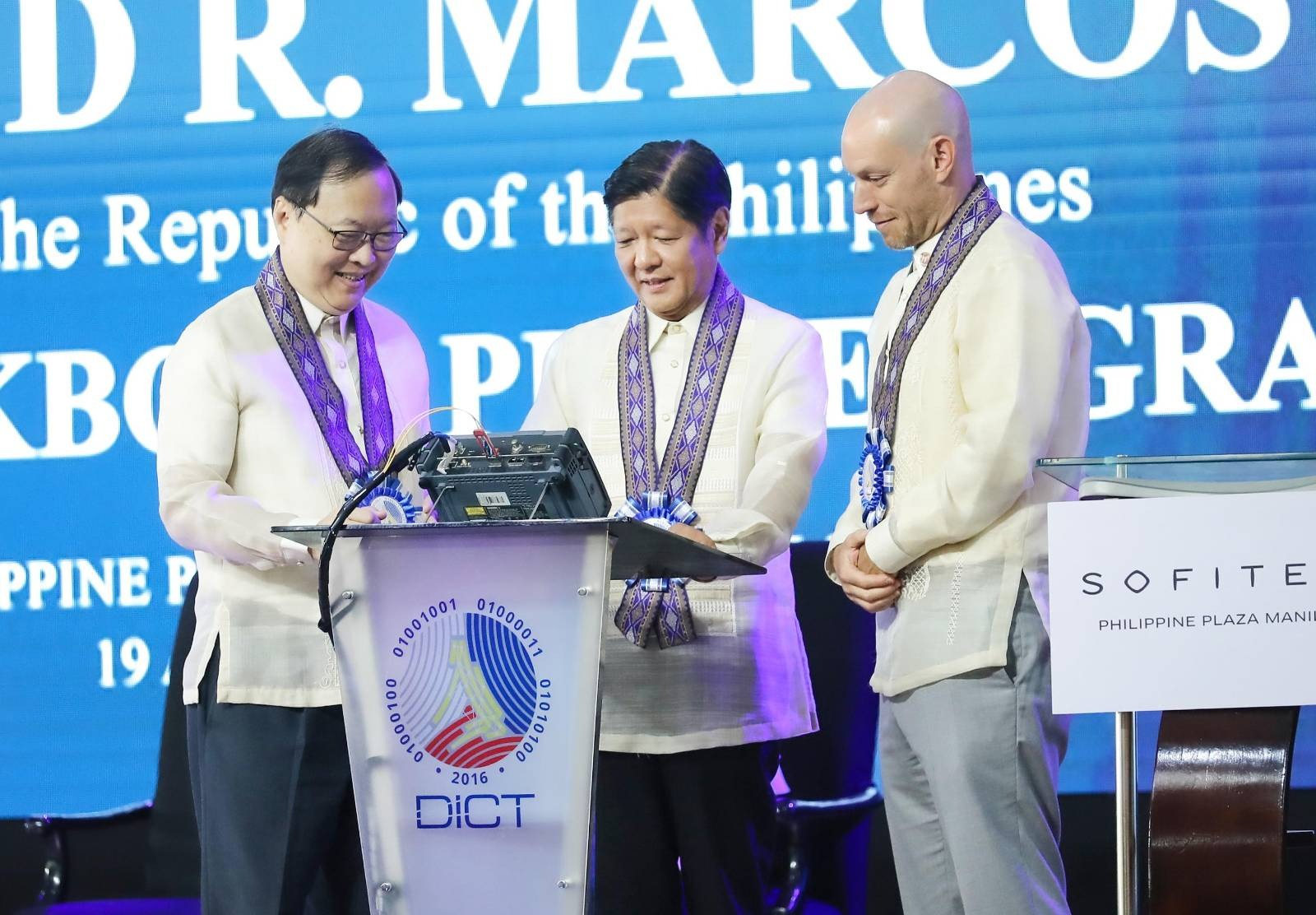
Uy (left), Philippine President Bongbong Marcos (center), and New Zealand Prime Minister Christopher Luxon (right) during the launch of National Fiber Backbone Project Phase 1 at Sofitel Philippine Plaza, Pasay in 2024.

Ivan John Uy has been involved with the Philippine Chamber of Commerce and Industry (PCCI) as its corporate secretary and chairman of Philippine Business Conference Resolutions Committee.

Uy also was part of the Supreme Court of the Philippines, first joining the high court as a legal researcher before becoming the chief information officer during the tenure of Chief Justice Hilario Davide Jr.

He was also appointed as chairman of the Commission on Information and Communications Technology by President Benigno Aquino III in 2010 before the body was dissolved in 2011. He oversaw the conceptualization of the Philippine Digital Strategy 2011–2016.

President-elect Bongbong Marcos designated Uy as Secretary of the Department of Information and Communications Technology (DICT), succeeding acting secretary Emmanuel Rey Caintic. Uy pledged to advance digital literacy, particularly by promoting digital hygiene in elementary schools to mitigate the impact of cybercrime. During his tenure, he launched several eGovernment initiatives and oversaw the expansion of the Free Public Internet Access Program. He resigned from the post as confirmed on March 6, 2025, due to undisclosed reasons, but his frequent overseas trips were cited as a factor.

Political offices
Preceded by Emmanuel Rey Caintic; Acting	Secretary of Information and Communications Technology; 2022–2025	Succeeded by Paul Mercado; OIC
