= Gregorio Honasan =

Filipino politician and former military officer

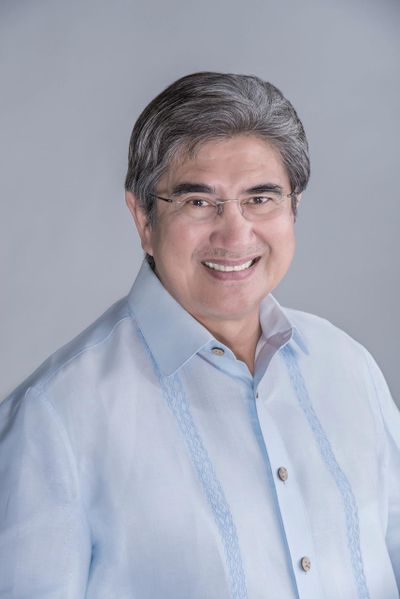
- Official portrait, 2016

2nd Secretary of Information and Communications Technology
- In office July 1, 2019 – October 8, 2021
- President: Rodrigo Duterte
- Preceded by: Eliseo Rio Jr. (OIC)
- Succeeded by: Jose Arturo De Castro (OIC)

Senate Majority Leader
- Acting
- In office June 6, 2013 – July 22, 2013
- Preceded by: Tito Sotto
- Succeeded by: Alan Peter Cayetano

Senator of the Philippines
- In office June 30, 2007 – June 30, 2019
- In office June 30, 1995 – June 30, 2004

Chair of the Senate National Defense and Security Committee
- In office July 25, 2016 – November 20, 2018
- Preceded by: Antonio Trillanes
- Succeeded by: Panfilo Lacson

Chair of the Senate Peace, Unification and Reconciliation Committee
- In office July 25, 2016 – November 20, 2018
- Preceded by: TG Guingona
- Succeeded by: Ronald dela Rosa

Chair of the Senate Agrarian Reform Committee
- In office July 26, 2010 – June 30, 2016
- Preceded by: Francis Pangilinan
- Succeeded by: Alan Peter Cayetano

Personal details
- Born: Gregorio Ballesteros Honasan II; March 14, 1948 (age 78) Baguio, Mountain Province, Philippines
- Party: Reform PH (since 2024)
- Other political affiliations: UNA (2012–2021); Independent (until 2012; 2021–2024)
- Spouse: Jane Umali
- Relations: Barbie Almalbis (daughter-in-law)
- Children: 5, including Kai
- Education: Philippine Military Academy (BS)
- Occupation: Politician
- Profession: Soldier
- Civilian awards: Presidential Government Medal

Military service
- Allegiance: Philippines
- Branch/service: Philippine Army
- Years of service: 1971–1989
- Rank: Colonel
- Battles/wars: Insurgency in the Philippines
- Military awards: Distinguished Conduct Star

Gregorio "Gringo" Ballesteros Honasan II ([hoˈnasan], born March 14, 1948), is a Filipino politician and a cashiered Philippine Army officer who served as a senator of the Philippines from 1995 to 2004 and again from 2007 to 2019. He also led the unsuccessful coups d'état against President Corazon Aquino. He played a key role in the 1986 EDSA Revolution that toppled President Ferdinand Marcos, and participated in the EDSA III rallies in 2001 that preceded the May 1 riots near Malacañang Palace.

After 1986, he led a series of unsuccessful but violent coup attempts against the administration of Corazon Aquino. President Fidel Ramos granted him amnesty in 1992. He entered politics and became a senator from 1995 to 2004, and again from 2007 to 2019. He ran for vice president of the Philippines, being Jejomar Binay's running-mate in 2016, but both were respectively defeated by Leni Robredo and Rodrigo Duterte.

On November 22, 2018, President Duterte appointed then-Senator Honasan as Secretary of Department of Information and Communications Technology, which took effect after the latter's senatorial term, with Eliseo Rio serving as acting secretary. He established much digital policies that helped the Philippine ICT landscape.

== Early life and education ==
Gregorio Honasan was born in Baguio to Colonel Romeo Gillego Honasan and Alicia "Alice" Masip Ballesteros, both from Sorsogon province. He has six siblings.

Honasan spent his elementary days at San Beda College from kindergarten to Grade 6. After which, he went to Taiwan and studied at the Dominican School, Taipei, Taiwan. He then returned to the Philippines and finished his high school at Don Bosco Technical College. He attained his Bachelor of Science degree at the Philippine Military Academy, where he received the title of "Class Baron", the academy's highest leadership award. Among his advisors at the academy was Victor Corpus, whom he later credited with instilling the "radical thinking" of him and his batchmates. By his 1971 graduation, Honasan had gained the nickname "Gringo", which came from the Mexican Spanish term used to refer to the unnamed Clint Eastwood character in the 1964–66 Dollars film trilogy.

== Military career ==
After graduating in 1971, he joined the Philippine Army's special forces, 1st Scout Ranger Regiment and went into combat against separatist and communist insurgents in Luzon and Mindanao. He was wounded in action at battles in Lebak and Jolo. Making his way up through the armed forces, he became aide-de-camp to Defense Minister Juan Ponce Enrile in 1974, and later became the Defense Ministry's Chief of Security.

Concurrent with his position as security chief, he was a board member of the Northern Mindanao Development Bank and president of the Beatriz Marketing Company.

== Political career ==
=== People Power ===
In 1986, Honasan and a cabal of colonels, backed by Enrile, tried to use popular unrest to overthrow the dictatorship of President Ferdinand Marcos. When the plot was uncovered, the conspirators sought refuge in the military headquarters and called on civilians, the media, and the Catholic Church for protection. Hundreds of thousands of people served as human shields to protect Honasan and his men from Marcos' forces, sparking the 1986 People Power Revolution that led to Marcos' fall from power and the installation of Corazon Aquino as president.

=== Coups d'état ===
Aquino awarded Honasan a Distinguished Conduct Star for the EDSA Revolution and the Presidential Government Medal in 1986. Under the new government, he was head of a special group in the defense ministry. Using his position, he was covertly involved in various coup attempts against Aquino.

On August 28, 1987, fighting broke out in the streets and Honasan ordered his men to attack government installations, resulting in the deaths of dozens, including many civilians. The attack was put down by government forces, but Honasan was able to escape. He was later captured and imprisoned on a Navy ship in Manila Bay. He later escaped once again by convincing his guards to join his cause.

=== Senate ===
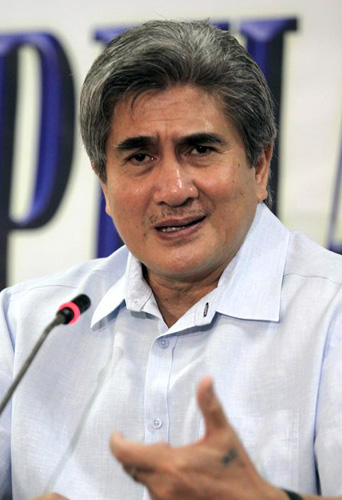
Honasan in 2010

Philippine President Fidel Ramos, who was elected in 1992, granted amnesty to Honasan, who utilized his rebel infamy to enter politics in 1995, becoming the second independent candidate in Philippine history to win a seat in the Senate after Magnolia Antonino. He was re-elected to a three-year term in 2001, filling the vacant seat left by Senator Teofisto Guingona Jr., who was appointed by President Gloria Macapagal Arroyo as Vice President. From April 25 to May 1, 2001, together with Juan Ponce Enrile, Miriam Defensor Santiago, Panfilo Lacson and Vicente Sotto III, he spoke at the EDSA III protests in support of deposed President Joseph Estrada. On May 1, 2001, the protesters stormed Malacañang Palace.

He left the Senate when his term expired in 2004. In the general election held in May 2007, he was again elected to the Senate. Running as an independent candidate, he polled some 11.6 million votes, finishing 10th out of 37 candidates for 12 Senate vacancies. He took up his post on June 30. He was reelected during the 2013 elections, placing 12th with 13,211,424 votes, his fourth term.

During the 2016 Philippine general elections, Honasan was Jejomar Binay's running mate under the United Nationalist Alliance party. Honasan placed 6th in the vice presidential race, garnering only 788,881 or 1.92% of votes.

In 2017, the Sandiganbayan anti-corruption court ordered the arrest of Honasan over allegations of graft connected to the pork barrel scam.

=== Information and Communications Technology Secretary ===
On November 22, 2018, President Duterte appointed Honasan as secretary of Department of Information and Communications Technology. Acting Secretary Eliseo Rio Jr. held the position until the end of Honasan's Senate term. Honasan was sworn into the office on July 1, 2019, and confirmed by the Commission on Appointments on September 11, 2019.

In January 2020, the department was flagged by the Commission on Audit of the Philippines for ₱300 million worth of cash advances of confidential funds under Honasan. Undersecretary of Operations Eliseo Rio Jr. also questioned the cash advances as he resigned from his position. Secretary Honasan and Undersecretary Rio later issued a joint statement to state that the confidential expenses were "lawful and legitimate" and that "Undersecretary Rio's resignation was due to personal reasons, and not due to any rift with the Secretary, nor to any anomaly in the Confidential Expense."

=== Senate comeback attempts ===
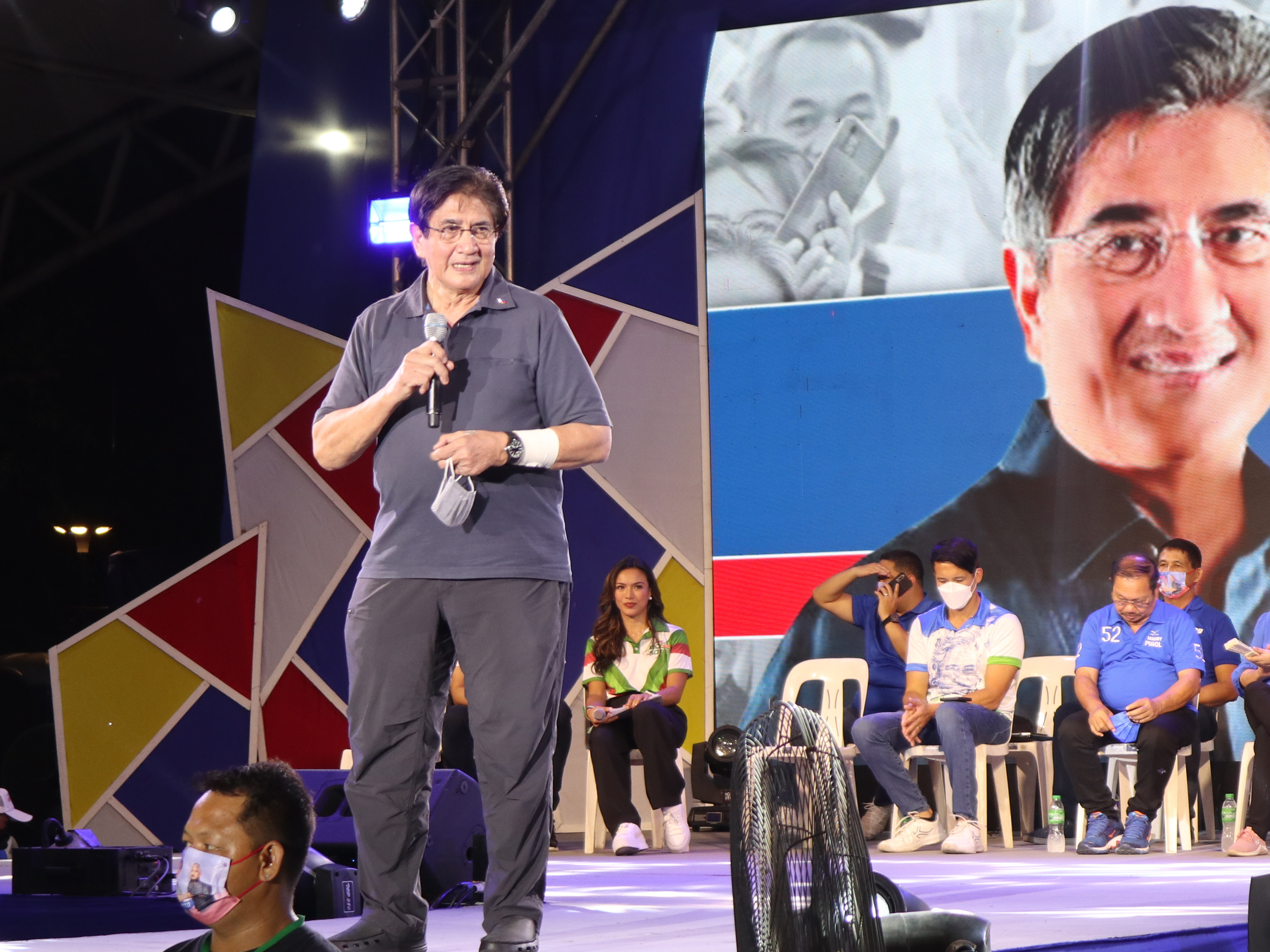
Honasan speaking at a Lacson–Sotto campaign rally at Quezon Memorial Circle, Quezon City in 2022

On October 8, 2021, Honasan filed his certificate of candidacy to run for senator in 2022, effectively ending his time as Secretary of Information and Communications Technology. His candidacy was endorsed by President Rodrigo Duterte, making him part of the PDP–Laban senatorial slate, although he was an independent. He was also named to the senatorial slate of tickets led by presidential aspirants Panfilo Lacson and Bongbong Marcos (under UniTeam), respectively. However, he lost his bid with 10,668,886 votes, ranking 18th out of the 12 seats up for election. He conceded from the race on May 11, 2022.

On October 7, 2024, Honasan filed his certificate of candidacy to run for senator in 2025, this time under Reform PH Party. However, he lost once again, placing 28th.

== Electoral history ==
Electoral history of Gregorio Honasan
Year	Office	Party	Votes received				Result
Year	Office	Party	Total	%	P.	Swing	Result
1995	Senator of the Philippines	IND	8,968,616	34.85%	9th	—N/a	Won
2001	Senator of the Philippines	IND	10,454,527	35.47%	13th (Note: Elected to serve the unexpired term (until 2004) of Teofisto Guingona Jr., who was appointed Vice President in February 2001.)	+0.62	Won
2007	Senator of the Philippines	IND	11,605,531	39.34%	10th	+3.87	Won
2013	Senator of the Philippines	UNA	13,211,424	32.91%	12th	-6.43	Won
2022	Senator of the Philippines	IND	10,643,491	19.16%	18th	-13.75	Lost
2025	Senator of the Philippines	RP	6,700,772	11.68%	28th	-7.48	Lost
2016	Vice President of the Philippines	UNA	788,881	1.92%	6th	—N/a	Lost

== Post-political life ==
In April 2024, lawyer and film producer Ferdinand Topacio announced plans for a biographical film about Honasan titled Gringo: The Greg Honasan Story to be directed by Lester Dimaranan, with Senator Robin Padilla later cast as Honasan; Padilla had previously portrayed him in the 1994 action film Col. Billy Bibit, RAM.

On June 10, 2024, Honasan and other colleagues in Magdalo and the RAM established the Reform PH party in San Juan, Metro Manila.

== In popular culture ==
- Parodied by veteran comedian Chiquito in the 1988 comedy film Gorio Punasan, Rebel Driver, the title being a pun on his name which literally translates as "Wipe Gorio".
- Parodied in the 1987 comedy film Kumander Gringa starring Roderick Paulate.
- Portrayed by Rez Cortez in the 1988 true to life drama TV film A Dangerous Life.
- Portrayed by Robin Padilla in the 1994 true-to-life action-drama film Col. Billy Bibit, RAM and the upcoming biopic film Gringo: The Greg Honasan Story.
- Portrayed by Moises Miclat in the 2007 comedy film Ang Cute ng Ina Mo!.

== Notes ==
Senate of the Philippines
Preceded by Francis Pangilinan	Chair of the Philippine Senate; Agrarian Reform Committee; 2010–2016	Succeeded by Alan Peter Cayetano
Preceded by Tito Sotto	Majority Floor Leader of the Senate of the Philippines; Acting; 2013	Succeeded by Alan Peter Cayetano
Preceded by Antonio Trillanes	Chair of the Philippine Senate; National Defense and Security Committee; 2016–2019	Succeeded by Panfilo Lacson
Preceded by Teofisto Guingona III	Chair of the Philippine Senate; Peace, Unification and Reconciliation Committee; 2016–2019	Succeeded by Ronald dela Rosa
Political offices
Preceded by Eliseo Rio Jr. OIC	Secretary of Information and Communications Technology; 2019–2021	Succeeded by Jose Arturo De Castro; OIC
