= Secretary of Information and Communications Technology =

Government post in the Philippines

- Kalihim ng Teknolohiyang Pang-Impormasyon at Komunikasyon
- Official seal of the Department of Information and Communications Technology

- Incumbent; Robert Joseph Montes de Claro (ad interim) since October 13, 2026
- Style: The Honorable
- Member of: Cabinet
- Appointer: The president with the consent of the Commission on Appointments
- Term length: At the president's pleasure
- Inaugural holder: Rodolfo Salalima
- Formation: June 9, 2016
- Website: www.dict.gov.ph

The secretary of information and communications technology (Filipino: Kalihim ng Teknolohiyang Pang-Impormasyon at Komunikasyon) is the member of the Cabinet in charge of the Department of Information and Communications Technology.

== Functions ==
The Secretary of Information and Communications Technology has the following functions:

- Provide direction and supervision over the operations of the department and its attached agencies;
- Establish policies and standards for the department's operations;
- Review and approve requests for financial and manpower resources in the department;
- Designate and appoint officers and employees of the department, excluding the undersecretaries, assistant secretaries, and regional and assistant regional directors;
- Exercise disciplinary powers over officers and employees of the department;
- Coordinate with local government units, other agencies and public and private interest groups on department policies and initiatives;
- Prepare and submit to the president an estimate of the expenditures of the department during the next fiscal year;
- Serve as a member of the Government Procurement Policy Board;
- Advise the president on the development of information and communications technology;
- Formulate rules and regulations and exercise other powers for the implementation of the Department of Information And Communications Technology Act of 2015; and
- Perform other tasks provided by law or assigned by the president.

== List of secretaries of Information and Communications Technology ==
Portrait	Name (Birth–Death)	Took office	Left office	President
	Rodolfo Salalima	June 30, 2016	September 22, 2017	Rodrigo Duterte
	Eliseo Rio Jr. (born 1944); Officer in Charge	October 12, 2017	July 1, 2019	Rodrigo Duterte
	Gregorio Honasan (born 1948)	July 1, 2019	October 8, 2021	Rodrigo Duterte
	Jose Arturo de Castro; Officer in Charge	October 8, 2021	December 20, 2021	Rodrigo Duterte
	Emmanuel Rey Caintic; Acting	December 20, 2021	June 30, 2022	Rodrigo Duterte
	Ivan John Uy	June 30, 2022	March 6, 2025	Bongbong Marcos
	Paul Joseph Mercado; Acting	March 10, 2025	March 19, 2025	Bongbong Marcos
	Henry Aguda	March 20, 2025	October 9, 2026	Bongbong Marcos
	Robert Joseph Montes de Claro; Ad Interim	October 13, 2026	Incumbent	Bongbong Marcos
