= Velarde map =

Map of the early colonial Philippines, noted for its comprehensiveness

1734 Library of Congress copy

1734 National Library of Spain copy

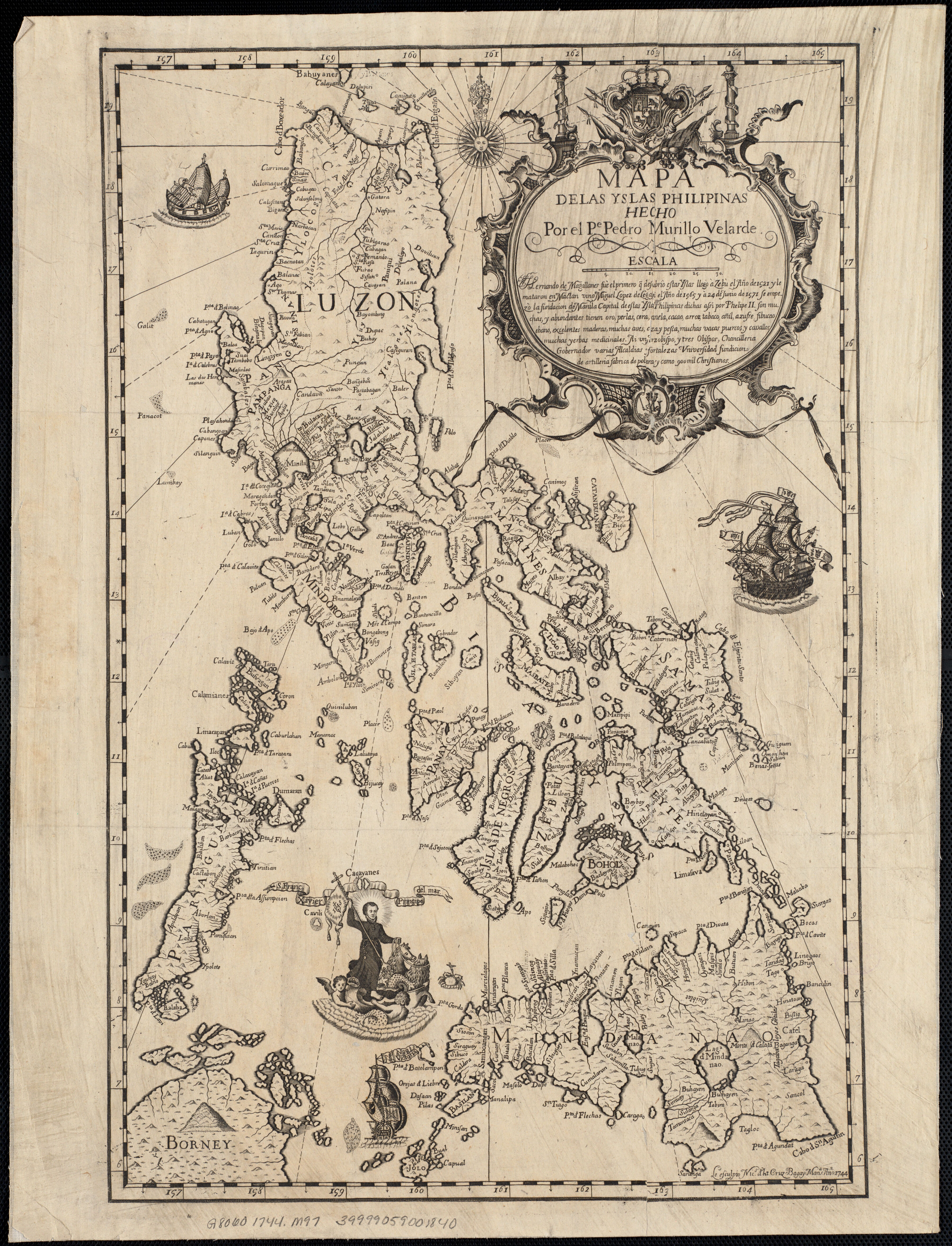
1744 Reduced version, Boston Public Library copy

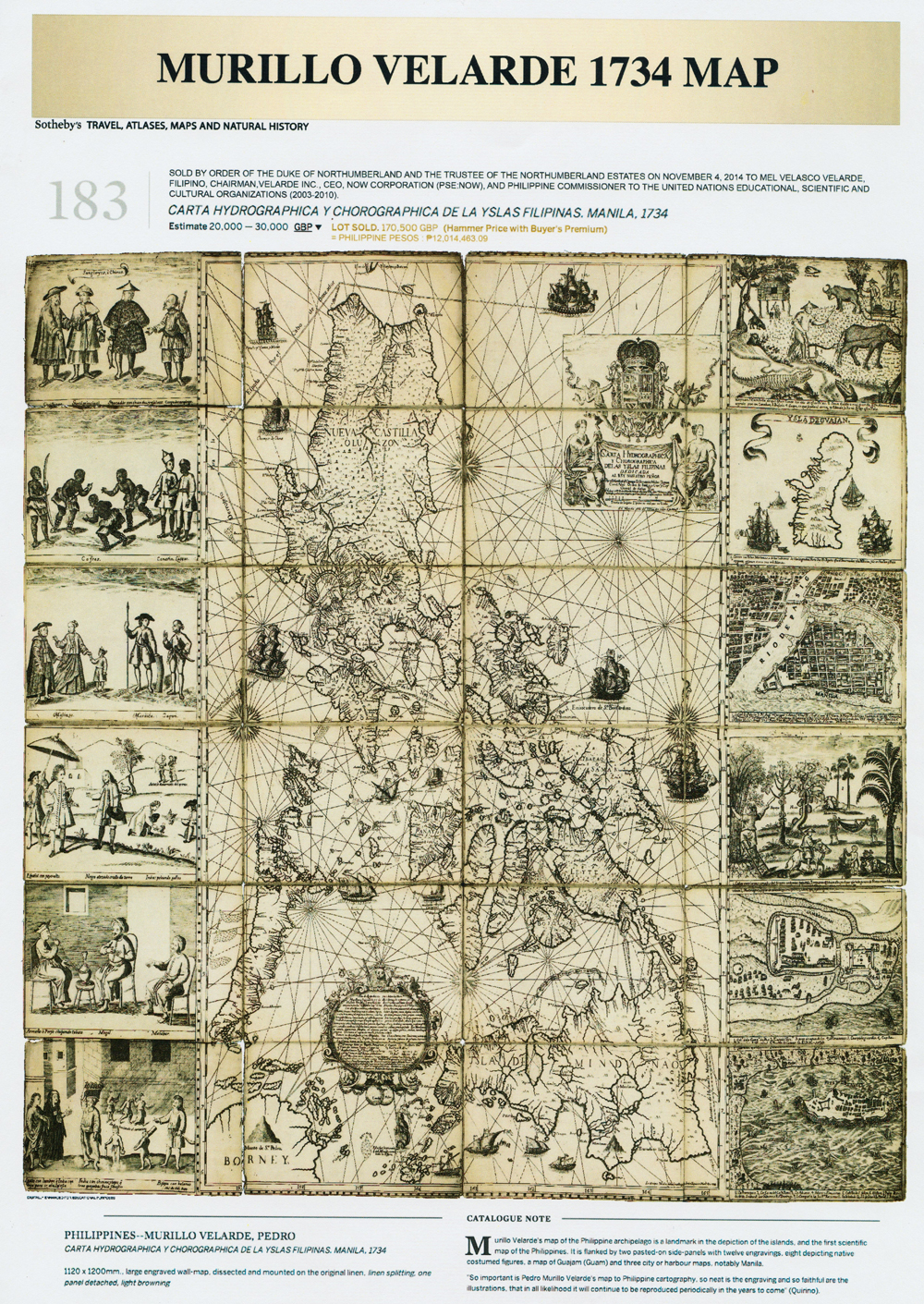
Replica of Mel Velarde-acquired 1734 copy that he gave to the Philippine Army.

Carta Hydrographica y Chorographica de las Islas Filipinas (Spanish, lit. "Hydrographical and Chorographical Chart of the Philippine Islands"), more commonly known as the Velarde map, is a map of the Philippines made and first published in Manila in 1734 by the Jesuit cartographer Pedro Murillo Velarde, the engraver Nicolás de la Cruz Bagay, and the artist Francisco Suárez. The World Digital Library describes it as the "first and most important scientific map of the Philippines". It is frequently referred to as the "Mother of all Philippine Maps".

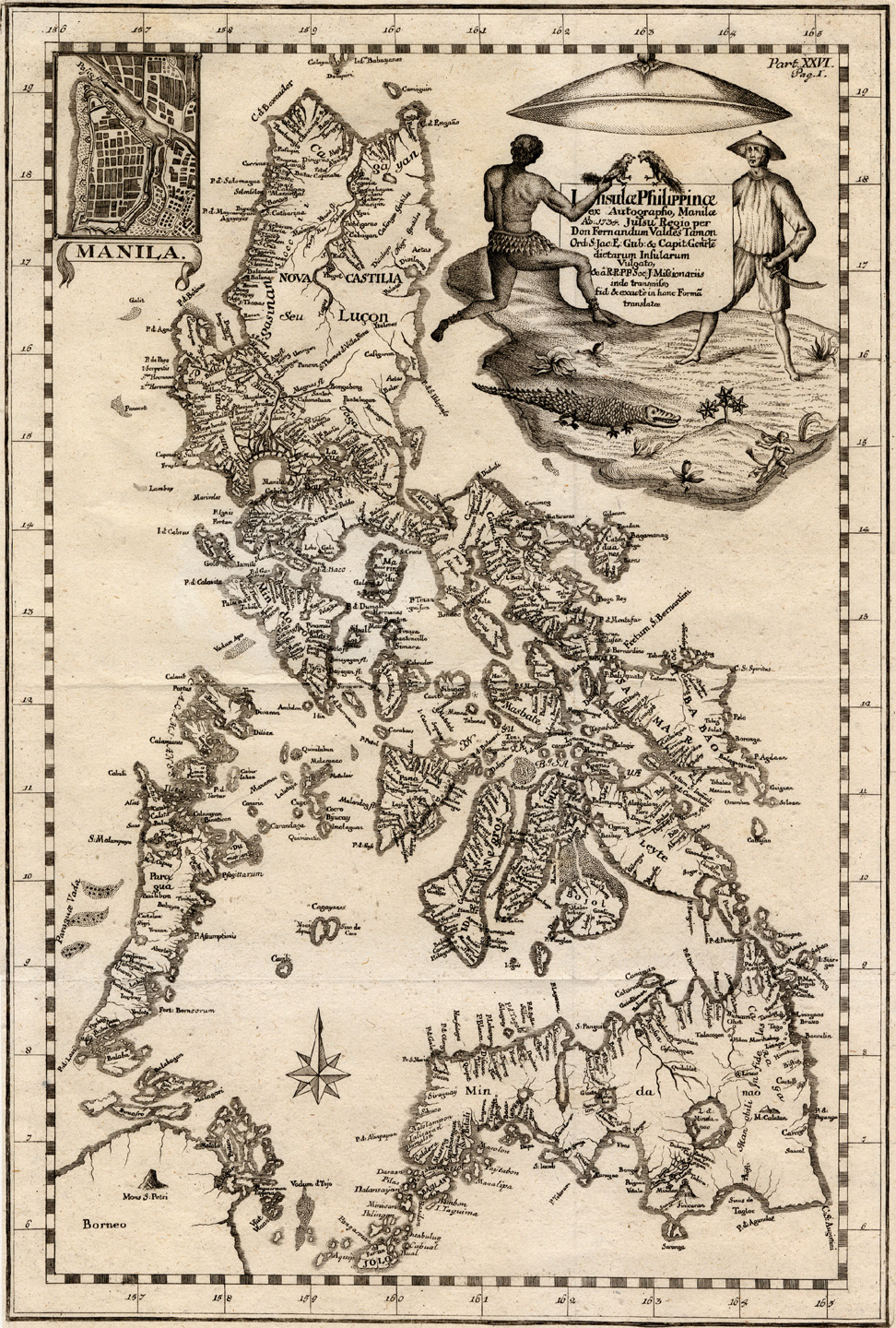
The 1774 version of the map in Latin

During the British occupation of Manila between 1762 and 1764, the copper plates used to print the map were seized and transported to England, where they were used to produce multiple copies of the map. Many copies from this reprinting later sold at very high prices as antiquities.

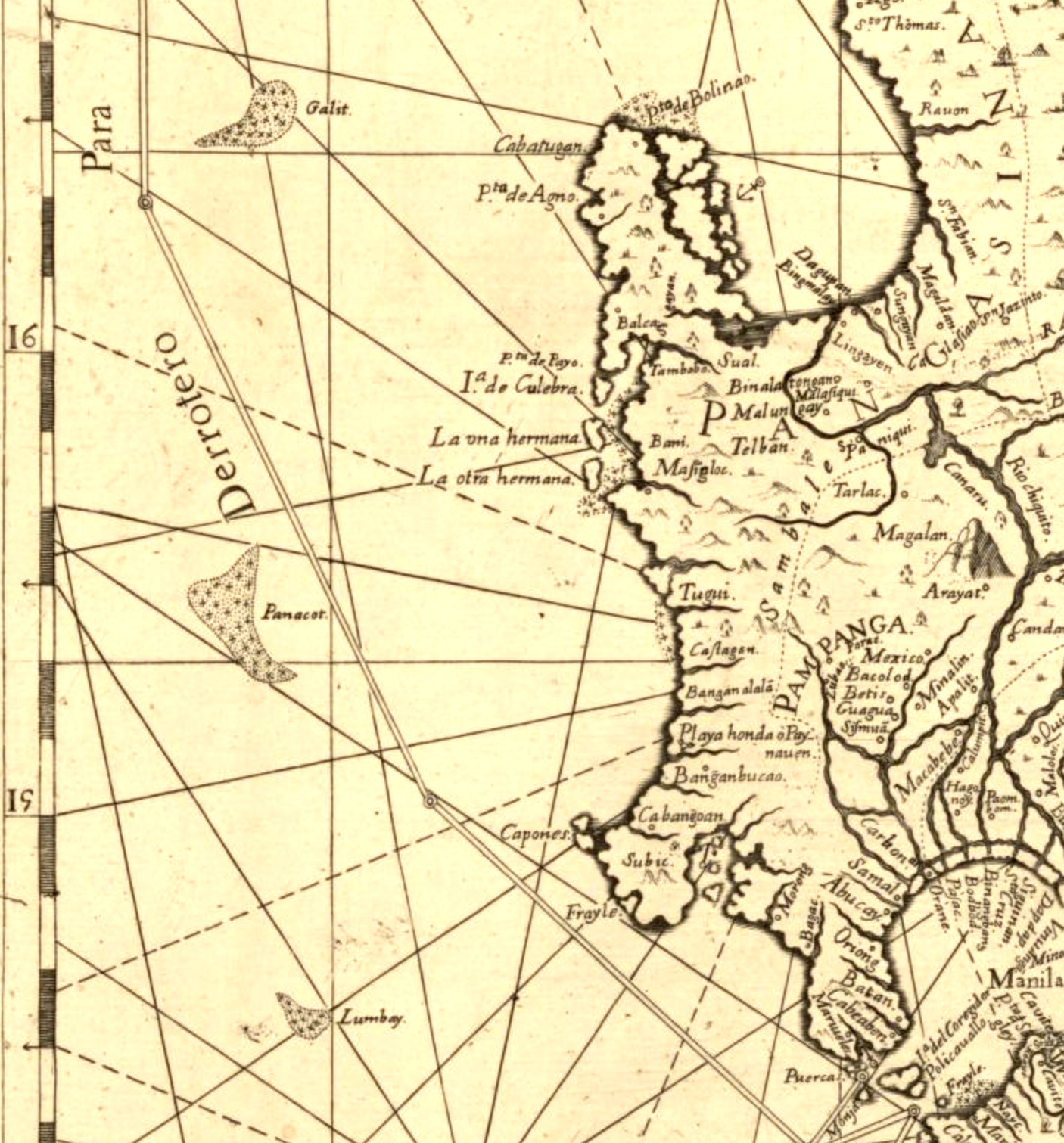
Galit, Panacot, and Lumbay shown off the coast of Central Luzon in the 1734 map

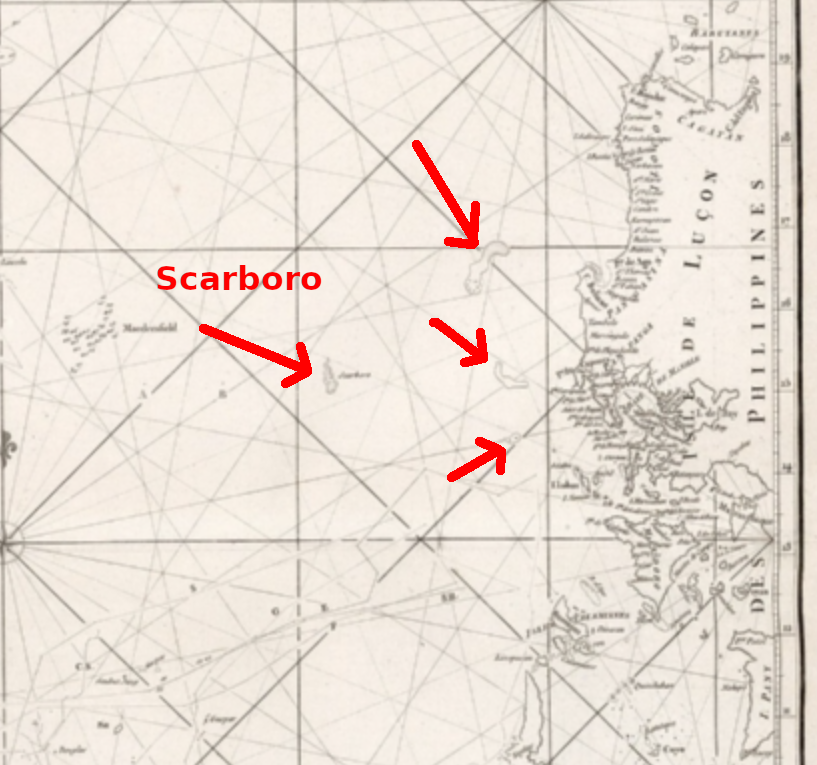
Scarborough Shoal, along with Galit, Panacot, and Lumbay shown off the coast of Central Luzon in the 1810 map, originally published in 1771

== The map ==
The map's title includes the following additional description: dedicada al Rey Nuestro Señor por el Mariscal d. Campo D. Fernando Valdes Tamon Cavallo del Orden de Santiago de Govor. Y Capn General de dichas Yslas (Spanish, "dedicated to the King Our Lord by Field Marshal Fernando Tamon Valdes, Knight of the Order of Santiago, Governor and Captain General of said Islands"). The map was created upon the behest of then governor-general Fernando Valdes y Tamon in response to an order from Philip V of Spain. Alongside his name, Nicolás de la Cruz Bagay noted he was an "Indio Tagalo".

The map shows maritime routes from Manila to Spain and New Spain. The Spanish royal coat of arms occupies a prominent space in the upper-middle portion of the map. On its flanks are twelve images, six to a side. Eight of these images depict various ethnic groups residing in the archipelago. The remaining four are cartographic depictions of cities and islands. The ethnic groups and individuals depicted include Chinese Filipinos ("Sangley"), "Cafres" (or East Africans brought to the Manila slave market by the Portuguese), a Canarin (a native of India on the Konkani coast, most likely a Goan or Mangalorean), a Lascar from India, Filipino Mestizos in Spanish colonial Philippines, a Mardica (natives of Ternate and Tidore that migrated to the Philippines such as in Ternate, Cavite and Tanza, Cavite), a Japanese migrant in the Philippines ("Japon"), Spaniards or Spanish Filipinos, Spanish Criollos, Filipino Natives ("Indios"), Aetas, an Armenian, a Mughal, a native of the Malabar region and a Visayan. Maps of "Samboangan" (known today as Zamboanga City, a city in Mindanao), the port of Cavite, the island of "Guajan" (Guam) and Manila, and illustrations of endemic plants and animals, occupy the remaining sections.

The Murillo Velarde map was widely reprinted. These include reproductions in Manila (1744), Vienna (1748) by Kaliwoda, Nuremberg (1760) by Lowitz, and in the first volume of Juan de la Concepcion's Historia General de Philipinas (1788).

In 2025, the map was proclaimed as a national cultural treasure by the National Library of the Philippines.

== Copies ==
There are less than 50 extant copies of the map. Some are mounted on a cloth backing measuring 112×120 cm. The map itself measures 108×71 cm and is on a scale approximating 1:1,400,000.

- The American Library of Congress Geography and Map Division in Washington, D.C., has one copy of the original 1734 printing, Call No. G8060 1734 .M8.
- The National Library of Spain in Madrid has one copy of the original 1734 printing, Call No. MR/45/31.
- The National Library of France has a copy.
- The British Library has a copy
- There is one copy in a private collection in the Philippines.
- In 2014 the Duke of Northumberland, Ralph Percy, had a copy of the map auctioned off by Sotheby's. Filipino businessman Mel Velarde won the auction, paying £170,500.00 (approximately ₱12 million) for it. This copy had been printed by the British using the eight original Murillo Velarde copperplates which had been looted from Manila by William Draper during the British occupation of Manila in 1762. Draper donated the plates to Cambridge University and the university printed copies of the map, one of which later came into the possession of the Duke of Northumberland of the late 18th century. The British, however, later melted down the copperplates and reused the metal in printing their Admiralty charts. Velarde donated the map to the National Museum of the Philippines in 2017. It is in permanent display at the National Library of the Philippines. In 2025, it was declared National Cultural Treasure.
- In 2019, a copy of the 18th century British printing was purchased at an auction in the Philippines for 40 million Philippine pesos (US$812,183), significantly more than the pre-auction estimate of 18 million pesos, through the efforts of Chief Justice Antonio Carpio and his friend, Mel Velasco Velarde. This map was part of an unspecified private collection and one of at least three such versions currently in private collections in the Philippines.

=== Reduced version ===
Murillo Velarde also published a smaller version of the Carta Hydrographica y Chorographica de las Yslas Filipinas, one that did not include the twelve illustrations on the map's flanks. This version measures 51x33 cm. and was published in 1744. There are extant copies in the collections of the Lopez Museum, National Library of the Philippines and Boston Public Library Norman B. Leventhal Map Center.

== South China Sea disputes ==
The Murillo Velarde map has been instrumental in the Philippines' efforts to assert territorial rights in the South China Sea. The map, along with 270 other maps, was used by the Philippines' team of experts to refute China's historic claim of ownership of the entire South China Sea. The indigenous name Panacot is reflected in the map as Scarborough Shoal. In 2016 the Permanent Court of Arbitration in The Hague ruled in favor of the Philippines, stating that China had "no historical rights" based on their nine-dash line map. China rejected the ruling, while the Philippines, the United States, Japan, South Korea, Vietnam, Indonesia, Malaysia, the United Kingdom, and France welcomed the ruling.
