= Now Corporation =

Filipino conglomerate

- Company type: Public
- Traded as: PSE: NOW
- Industry: Conglomerate
- Predecessor: MF Schroder & Co., Inc. (1996–2002); Cashrounds, Inc. (2002–2006); Information Capital Technology Ventures, Inc. (2006–2013)
- Founded: 5 June 1996; 29 years ago
- Headquarters: 5/F OPL Bldg., 100 C. Palanca St., Legaspi Village, Makati, Metro Manila, Philippines
- Key people: Dr. Thomas G. Aquino (Chairman); Mel V. Velarde (President and CEO)
- Services: Information and communications technology; Telecommunications; Broadband internet; Digital media; Cybersecurity
- Revenue: ₱189.68 million (2024)
- Operating income: ₱−2.21 million (2024)
- Net income: ₱−3.99 million (2024)
- Total assets: ₱3.12 billion (2024)
- Total equity: ₱2.18 billion (2024)
- Subsidiaries: See below
- Website: www.now-corp.com

Now Corporation (shortly known as Now Corp) is a Filipino conglomerate firm based in Makati, Philippines. The company's core businesses are centralized in the information and communications technology sector, including broadband internet and fiber-optic communication services (Now Telecom), information technology, digital media (NowPlanet.tv), management services, and cybersecurity among others.

== History ==
The company was founded on June 5, 1996 as MF Schroder & Co., Inc., initially offered security services. The company was renamed as Cashrounds, Inc. in 2002, and entered into initial public offering on the Philippine Stock Exchange.

Mel Velarde, a former executive of Central CATV, Inc. and president/CEO of Next Mobile Incorporated (NMI), acquired Cashrounds in 2005 in exchange of purchasing a partial stake in NMI. The following year, Cashrounds changed its corporate name to Information Capital Technology Ventures, Inc. (ICTV).

ICTV began initializing its business venture with Asian Institute of Journalism and Communication (AIJC), an educational institute also owned by Velarde.

In 2013, ICTV was officially renamed as Now Corporation (Now Corp), named after its primary businesses such as NowPlanet and Now Telecom.

In 2019, Now Corp inked a joint partnership with South Korean telecommunications firm SK Telecom for the rollout of Now Telecom's 5G broadband services.

On December 1, 2020, Now Corp inked a joint partnership with Finnish multinational telecommunication Nokia for the rollout of Now Telecom's 5G broadband services.

On October 3, 2022, Now Corp announced plans to acquire substantial equity ownership in News and Entertainment Network Corporation (Newsnet) in a 20% stakes affiliate, as part of its thrust to grow, consolidate, and beef up its core business.

On December 16, 2022, The US Trade and Development Agency secured grant funding for the 5G project. On January 13, 2023, The US Trade and Development Agency and Now Telecom sealed an agreement by the US government to deploy nationwide standalone 5G mobile and fixed wireless network in the Philippines. The company will begin its commercial network in 2024.

== List of assets ==
=== Now Telecom ===
Now Telecom is Now Corporation's main business asset. It is a telecommunications company providing wireless broadband services, cellular mobile telephony system (CMTS), and fiber optic transmission.

=== NowPlanet.tv ===
NowPlanet.tv is a digital media platform engaging in livestreaming of various digital channels. It is also the livestreaming provider of the Metropolitan Manila Development Authority for its traffic monitoring data centers.

=== Subsidiaries ===
- Holy Cow Animation
- iProfessional Search Network
- iResource Consulting International
- Porteon SEA, Inc.
- Softrigger Interactive
- Softweb Consulting

=== Affiliates ===
- Asian Institute of Journalism and Communication
- News and Entertainment Network Corporation (NEWSNET)
- Now Cable (f/k/a GHT Network, Inc.)

== Corporate governance ==
=== Ownership ===
| Shareholder/s | % of stake |
|---|---|
| Public stock | 26.97% |
| Velarde, Inc. | 26.11% |
| Emerald Investments, Inc. | 13.87% |
| Top Mega Enterprises, Ltd. | 12.67% |
| Gamboa Holdings, Inc. | 12.06% |
| Joyce Link Holdings Ltd. | 4.77% |
| Foodcamp Industries & Marketing, Inc. | 3.55% |
