= National Telecommunications Commission =

Philippine government agency

- Pambansang Komisyon sa Telekomunikasyon

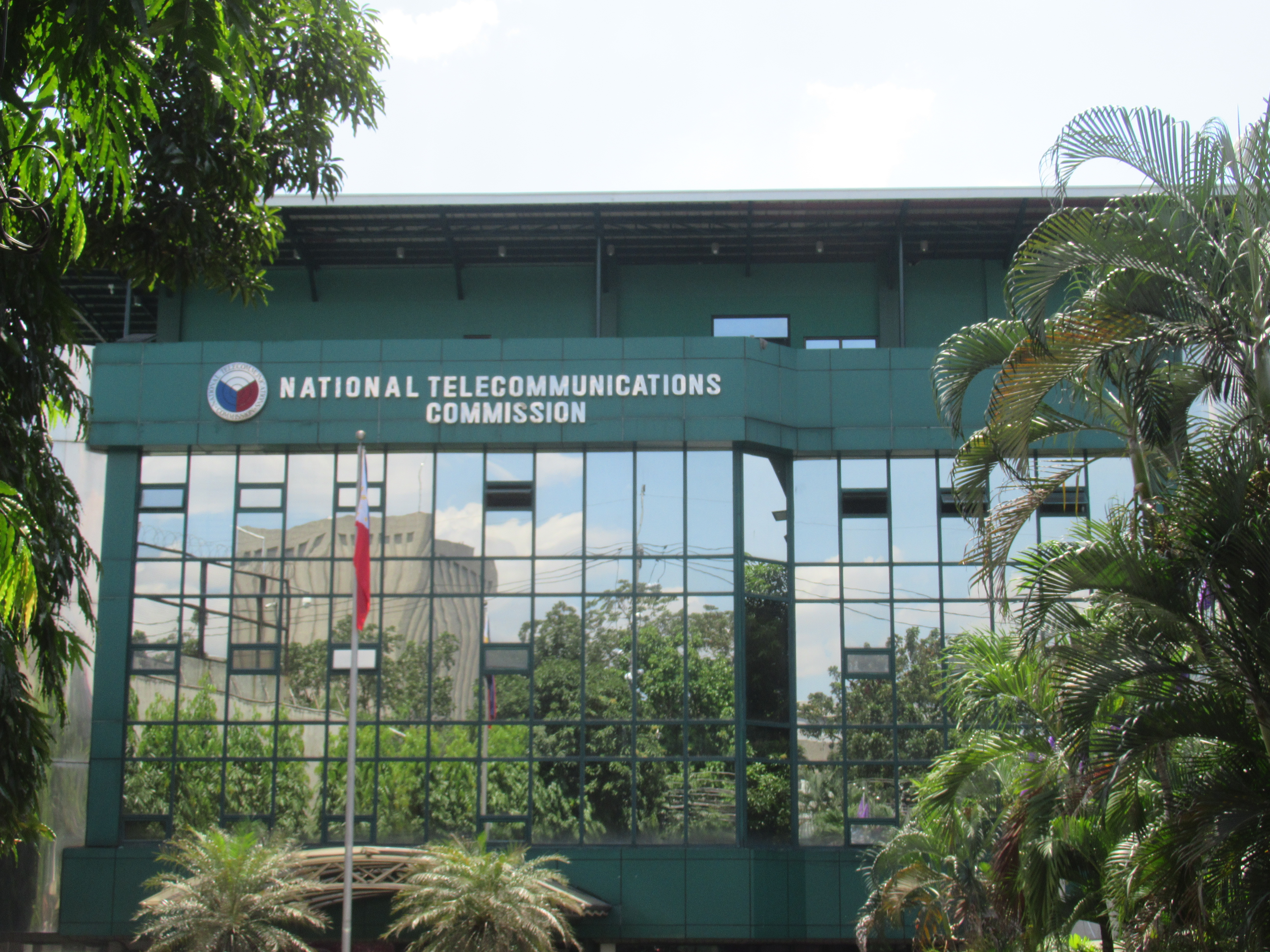
- National Telecommunications Commission Central Office, Quezon City

Agency overview
- Formed: July 23, 1979
- Jurisdiction: Government of the Philippines
- Headquarters: Senator Miriam P. Defensor-Santiago Avenue (BIR Road), East Triangle, Diliman, Quezon City
- Employees: 452 (2026)
- Annual budget: ₱726.45 million (2026)
- Agency executives: Atty. Ella Blanca B. Lopez, Commissioner; Atty. Jon Paulo V. Salvahan, Deputy Commissioner; Engr. Alvin Bernard N. Blanco, Deputy Commissioner
- Parent agency: Department of Information and Communications Technology
- Website: ntc.gov.ph

The National Telecommunications Commission (NTC; Filipino: Pambansang Komisyon sa Telekomunikasyon) is the telecommunications regulator of the Philippines.

It is an attached agency of the Department of Information and Communications Technology responsible for the supervision, adjudication and control over all telecommunications services and radio and television networks throughout the country.

== History ==
The National Telecommunications Commission (NTC) was established in 1979 under Executive Order No. 546. It took over the regulatory responsibilities of two former agencies–the Board of Communications and the Telecommunications Control Bureau–which were dissolved at the same time.

The NTC is the primary government body responsible for regulating telecommunications services and television networks across the Philippines. It sets and enforces rules on how these services are established, operated, and maintained nationwide.

In some cases, the NTC acts like a court by hearing disputes and issuing legally binding decisions. While it operates independently when making these regulatory and legal decisions, it is administratively attached to the Department of Information and Communications Technology. Decisions made by the NTC in this role may be appealed directly to the Supreme Court of the Philippines.

=== Timeline ===
- 1927: Act No. 3396 known as the Ship Radio Station Law was enacted. The Radio Construction and Maintenance Section, the first radio regulatory office was charged to enforce the said law.
- 1931: Act No. 3846 known as the Radio Control Law was enacted. The Radio Control Division in the Bureau of Post was created under the jurisdiction of the then Secretary of Commerce and Communications.
- 1939: The Radio Control Division was transferred to the Department of National Defense which was organized pursuant to Executive Order No. 230.
- 1947: The Radio Control Division was again transferred to the Department of Commerce and Industry which was created pursuant to Executive Order No. 230.
- 1951: Republic Act No. 1476 was enacted abolishing the Radio Control Board.
- 1962: Department Order 51 was issued changing the name of the Radio Control Division to the Radio Control Office.
- 1972: The Board of Communications (BOC) was created under the Integrated Reorganization Law. It was the first quasi-judicial body with adjudicatory powers on matters involving telecommunications services.
- 1974: The Radio Control Office was renamed the Telecommunications Control Bureau.
- 1979: By virtue of Executive Order No. 546, the TCB and the BOC were integrated into a single entity now known as the National Telecommunications Commission. The Ministry of Transportation and Communications, which was created under the same Order has administrative jurisdiction over the NTC.
- 1987: President Corazon Aquino issued Executive Order 125-A making the NTC an attached agency of the Department of Transportation and Communications (DOTC).
- 2004: President Gloria Macapagal Arroyo issued Executive Order No. 269 creating the Commission on Information and Communications Technology (CICT) and transferring the NTC from the DOTC to the CICT.
- 2005: President Gloria Macapagal Arroyo issued Executive Order No. 454 transferring the NTC back to the DOTC.
- 2008: President Gloria Macapagal Arroyo issued Executive Order No. 648 transferring the NTC back to the CICT.
- 2011: President Benigno Aquino III issued Executive Order No. 47 which retains the NTC under the Office of the President as part of the Other Executive Offices (OEO)
- 2016: President Benigno Aquino III signed Republic Act No. 10844 creating the Department of Information and Communications Technology (DICT) and making the NTC an attached agency of the newly created executive department.

== Effectiveness ==
The National Telecommunications Commission has been "hands off" since 1995 with the passage of Republic Act No. 7925, which deregulated and privatized the telecom industry. It is argued, that the "hands off" approach resulted in the Philippines having one of the slowest Internet in Asia. The NTC itself stated the said law is the "reason why the government has difficulty in regulating internet service today."

== Head ==
The NTC is headed by a commissioner appointed by the President.

=== List of commissioners ===
Commissioner	From	To
Ceferino C. Carreon	August 23, 1979	March 14, 1986
Tomas C. Reyes	March 14, 1986	April 1, 1986
Jose Luis A. Alcuaz	March 23, 1987	November 12, 1989
Josefina T. Lichauco (acting)	November 13, 1989	September 3, 1991
Mariano E. Benedicto II	September 4, 1991	January 7, 1993
Simeon L. Kintanar	January 7, 1993	January 31, 1998
Fidelo Q. Dumlao (acting)	February 1, 1998	July 15, 1998
Ponciano V. Cruz Jr.	July 16, 1998	December 14, 1998
Joseph A. Santiago	December 16, 1998	February 8, 2001
Agustin R. Bengzon (acting)	February 12, 2001	February 25, 2001
Eliseo M. Rio Jr.	February 26, 2001	June 3, 2002
Armi Jane R. Borje	June 3, 2002	January 16, 2004
Ronald O. Solis	January 19, 2004	November 29, 2006
Abraham R. Abesamis	November 30, 2006	August 10, 2007
Ruel V. Canobas	August 13, 2007	July 31, 2009
Gamaliel A. Cordoba	August 1, 2009	October 20, 2022
Ella Blanca B. Lopez	October 20, 2022^{[A]}	Incumbent

Notes:
- ^{A} Served as Officer in Charge until February 7, 2023.

== See also ==
- Department of Information and Communications Technology
- Internet censorship in the Philippines
