= Commission on Information and Communications Technology (Philippines) =

Agency in the Philippines from 2004-2010

- Komisyon sa Teknolohiyang Pang-impormasyon at Pangkomunikasyon

Agency overview
- Formed: January 12, 2004
- Preceding agency: Information Technology and Electronic Commerce Council (ITECC)
- Dissolved: June 23, 2011
- Superseding agency: Information and Communications Technology Office, Department of Science and Technology Department of Information and Communications Technology
- Annual budget: PHP113.4 million (2009)
- Agency executive: Ivan John Uy
- Website: www.cict.gov.ph

The Commission on Information and Communications Technology (CICT) (Filipino: Komisyon sa Teknolohiyang Pang-impormasyon at Pangkomunikasyon) was the primary policy, planning, coordinating, implementing, regulating, and administrative entity of the executive branch of the Philippine Government that would promote, develop, and regulate integrated and strategic information and communications technology (ICT) systems and reliable and cost-efficient communication facilities and services.

Established in 2004 by President Gloria Macapagal Arroyo, it was abolished in 2011 by her successor, Benigno Aquino III and folded with the Department of Science and Technology. In turn, it was supplanted by the Department of Information and Communications Technology.

== History ==
=== Beginnings ===
The CICT was created on January 12, 2004, by virtue of Executive Order No. 269, signed by President Gloria Macapagal Arroyo, as a transitory measure to the creation of a Department of Information and Communications Technology (DICT). The CICT was composed of the National Computer Center (NCC), the Telecommunications Office (TELOF), and all other operating units of the Department of Transportation and Communications (DOTC) dealing with communications. The National Telecommunications Commission (NTC) and the Philippine Postal Corporation (PhilPost) were also attached to the CICT for policy coordination. The CICT took over the functions of the Information Technology and Electronic Commerce Council (ITECC), which was subsequently abolished through Executive Order No. 334 on July 20, 2004.

=== Restructuring ===
Executive Order No. 454, signed on August 16, 2005, transferred the NTC back to the DOTC. According to EO 454, the transfer "will streamline bureaucracy operations." While the reasons for the transfer were unclear, there were discussions that placing the NTC under the CICT would be a bureaucratic anomaly since it is unusual for a commission to fall under another commission.

Executive Order No. 603, signed on February 17, 2007, transferred the TELOF and all other operating units of the CICT dealing with communications back to the DOTC. According to EO 603, the transfer "is necessitated by the present demands of national development and concomitant development projects as it will streamline bureaucracy operations and effectively promote fast, efficient and reliable networks of communication system and services." The transfer of the TELOF to the DOTC left the CICT with just two agencies—the NCC and the PhilPost.

Executive Order No. 648, signed on August 6, 2007, but published only on December 24, 2008, transferred the NTC back to the CICT.

Executive Order No. 780, signed on January 29, 2009, transferred the TELOF and all other operating units of the DOTC dealing with communications back to the CICT, thereby returning the CICT to its original composition.

=== Current status ===
Several bills in the Philippine Congress have been filed creating a Department of Information and Communications Technology (DICT), which would transform the CICT into an executive department.

In the House of Representatives, a consolidated bill, House Bill No. 4300, was approved on third and final reading on August 5, 2008, and transmitted to the Senate on August 11, 2008.

In the Senate, a consolidated bill, Senate Bill No. 2546, was approved by the Senate Committee on Science and Technology on August 19, 2008, but had not made it past second reading by the time Congress adjourned session on February 5, 2010, which means the bill is as good as dead. It will have to be refiled in both the House of Representatives and the Senate in the next Congress. With the failure of Congress to pass the DICT Bill, the legal basis of the CICT remains an executive order, which means the next President can abolish the CICT.

On June 23, 2011, Executive Order No. 47 was signed by President Aquino III. The order states that: "Reorganizing, renaming and transferring the Commission on Information and Communications Technology and its attached agencies to the Department of Science and Technology, directing the implementation thereof and for other purposes." Furthermore, "the positions of Chairman and Commissioners of the CICT are hereby abolished." The BPO stakeholders were surprised with the order and unhappy with the change.

== Head of agency ==
=== Chairman ===
The CICT is headed by a chairman, who is a member of the Cabinet with the rank of Secretary. The chairman is appointed by the President.

=== Additional responsibilities ===
Executive Order No. 561, signed on August 19, 2006, designated the CICT Chairman as the development champion of the Cyber Corridor super region.

Republic Act No. 9369, signed into law on January 23, 2007, designated the CICT Chairman as the Chairman of the Advisory Council to the Commission on Elections.

=== List of chairmen ===
Chairman	From	To
Virgilio L. Peña	February 16, 2004	April 30, 2006
Ramon P. Sales	May 2, 2006	June 30, 2007
Ray Anthony Roxas-Chua III	October 1, 2007	June 30, 2010
Ivan John E. Uy	July 29, 2010	June 23, 2011

== Other officials ==
=== Commissioners ===
The CICT Chairman is assisted by four Commissioners, who have the rank of Undersecretary and are appointed by the President.

=== List of commissioners ===
Commissioner	From	To
Angelo Timoteo M. Diaz de Rivera	September 21, 2004	June 30, 2010
Emmanuel C. Lallana	September 21, 2004	January 31, 2007
Damian Domingo O. Mapa	September 21, 2004	August 4, 2006
Elberto E. Emphasis (ex officio)	October 25, 2004	October 2005
Francisco S. Perez II (ex officio)	October 2005	September 22, 2006
Lorenzo G. Formoso III (ex officio)	September 25, 2006	July 2009
Monchito B. Ibrahim	December 5, 2007	June 23, 2011
Consuelo S. Perez	September 22, 2008	June 30, 2010
Francisco S. Perez II (ex officio)	August 2009	June 23, 2011

== Attached agencies ==
- Telecommunications Office (TELOF)
- National Telecommunications Commission (NTC)
- Philippine Postal Corporation (PhilPost)
