= Mel Velarde =

Filipino businessman

Mel Velasco Velarde is a Filipino businessman. He is chairman of the Filipino telecommunications conglomerate, Now Corporation and NOW Telecom, and chairman and CEO of the Asian Institute of Journalism and Communication (AIJC). He is known for acquiring the 1734 Murillo Velarde map, regarded as "The Mother of All Philippine Maps," through an auction at Sotheby's in London in 2014. The map served as critical evidence in the Philippines' 2016 win against claims of the People's Republic of China over the West Philippine Sea.

== Early life ==
His father, Meliton, suffered from an eye disease at his birth which led to total visual impairment.

At eight years old, Velarde was the youngest member of the Professional Photographers Association of the Philippines and accredited press photographer at the Philippine Constitutional Convention of 1971. He was awarded a plaque of recognition as the World's Youngest Photographer by Supreme Court Justice Felix Makasiar in 1972.

At age eleven, Velarde was a national chess and Game of the Generals finalist, and champion of national Siege game.

At 15 years old, Velarde was named the national champion in a weekly televised quiz bee, "Spin-A-Win," on Channel 9. He brought home the grand prize, a brand new 1978 Toyota Corolla. At this age, he was elected Secretary General of the Professional Photographers Association of the Philippines.

At 19, he was invited by the United Nations to be Honorary Speaker at the United Nations International Youth Leaders’ Conference in New York City in his capacity as Philippine Youth Non-Governmental Organization delegation chairman.

== Education ==
Velarde graduated summa cum laude from Boston University with a degree in Liberal Studies Major in Interdisciplinary Studies covering Humanities, Sciences and Mathematics. He received his master's degree in Business Economics from the University of Asia and the Pacific.

Velarde took up the Owners and Presidents Management Program at Harvard Business School, the International Human Rights Law summer course at University of Oxford, and Masters Cinematography at the American Society of Cinematographers, among other executive education programs and professional certified training programs.

== Career ==
He returned to the Philippines after the February 1986 People Power Revolution and became campaign manager for Raúl Manglapus in the 1987 Senate elections. He then moved to ABS-CBN to head the News and Public Affairs Department.

Velarde co-founded SkyCable Philippines in 1990. He served as its Executive Vice President and general manager. In 2005, he acquired the predecessor company of Now Corporation.

Velarde is Chairman of NOW Corporation, a publicly listed firm in the Philippine Stock Exchange with investments in technology, media and telecommunications. In 2022, during her visit to the Philippines, United States Vice President Kamala Harris announced the partnership of the United States with NOW Corporation's affiliate, NOW Telecom, for 5G technology deployment, through a grant from the United States Trade and Development Agency (USTDA). In a fact sheet, the White House said, “These efforts should provide faster and more reliable digital services and increased broadband Internet access for Filipinos countrywide.”

Velarde is also Chairman of the Asian Institute of Journalism and Communication (AIJC). Founded in 1980, AIJC has a Graduate School, which offers master's degree programs in communication and journalism; a Research, Policy, and Advocacy Unit, which undertakes policy and action research and project management in various development areas; and a Professional Development Program, which provides training for journalists, communicators, development managers, and other professionals from the public and private sectors.

In 2009, Velarde received the Top Taxpayer Award from the Bureau of Internal Revenue (BIR) after Velarde Inc. was recognized as Top ONETT Taxpayer for Revenue Region No. 8, having made the highest tax payment in that year.

In 2015, Velarde acquired the Murillo Velarde 1734 Map from the collection of Ralph Percy, the 12th Duke of Northumberland in an auction at Sotheby's in London. The map served as critical evidence in the Philippines’ win against China's claim over the West Philippine Sea in 2016. Velarde has been distributing replicas of the map to various institutions, barangays, and municipalities nationwide. It will be on display at the National Library of the Philippines’ permanent gallery upon its opening.
