= Department of Information and Communications Technology =

Executive department of the Philippine government

- Kagawaran ng Teknolohiyang Pang-Impormasyon at Komunikasyon

Department overview
- Formed: June 9, 2016; 10 years ago
- Preceding agencies: Department of Transportation and Communications¹; Information and Communications Technology Office, Department of Science and Technology; Commission on Information and Communications Technology
- Type: Department
- Jurisdiction: Government of the Philippines
- Headquarters: Studio 7, EDSA, South Triangle, Quezon City
- Employees: 972 (2026)
- Annual budget: ▲PH₱13.1 billion (2026)
- Department executive: Robert Joseph de Claro (Ad Interim), Secretary
- Child agencies: Cybercrime Investigation and Coordination Center; National Privacy Commission; National Telecommunications Commission
- Website: www.dict.gov.ph

Footnotes
- ¹Renamed to "Department of Transportation"

The Department of Information and Communications Technology (DICT) (Filipino: Kagawaran ng Teknolohiyang Pang-Impormasyon at Komunikasyon) is the executive department of the Philippine government responsible for the planning, development and promotion of the country's information and communications technology (ICT) agenda in support of national development.

== History ==
=== Predecessor ===
The Commission on Information and Communications Technology, a preceding agency, was created on January 12, 2004, by virtue of Executive Order No. 269, signed by President Gloria Macapagal Arroyo, as a transitory measure to the creation of a Department of Information and Communications Technology (DICT). The CICT was composed of the National Computer Center (NCC), the Telecommunications Office (TELOF), and all other operating units of the Department of Transportation and Communications (DOTC) dealing with communications. The National Telecommunications Commission (NTC) and the Philippine Postal Corporation (PhilPost) were also attached to the CICT for policy coordination. The CICT took over the functions of the Information Technology and Electronic Commerce Council (ITECC), which was subsequently abolished through Executive Order No. 334 on July 20, 2004.

=== Restructuring ===
Executive Order No. 454, signed on August 16, 2005, transferred the NTC back to the DOTC. According to EO 454, the transfer "will streamline bureaucracy operations." While the reasons for the transfer were unclear, there were discussions that placing the NTC under the CICT would be a bureaucratic anomaly, since it is unusual for a commission to fall under another commission.

Executive Order No. 603, signed on February 17, 2007, transferred the TELOF and all other operating units of the CICT dealing with communications back to the DOTC. According to EO 603, the transfer "is necessitated by the present demands of national development and concomitant development projects as it will streamline bureaucracy operations and effectively promote fast, efficient and reliable networks of communication system and services." The transfer of the TELOF to the DOTC left the CICT with just two agencies—the NCC and the PhilPost.

Executive Order No. 648, signed on August 6, 2007, but published only on December 24, 2008, transferred the NTC back to the CICT.

Executive Order No. 780, signed on January 29, 2009, transferred the TELOF and all other operating units of the DOTC dealing with communications back to the CICT, thereby returning the CICT to its original composition.

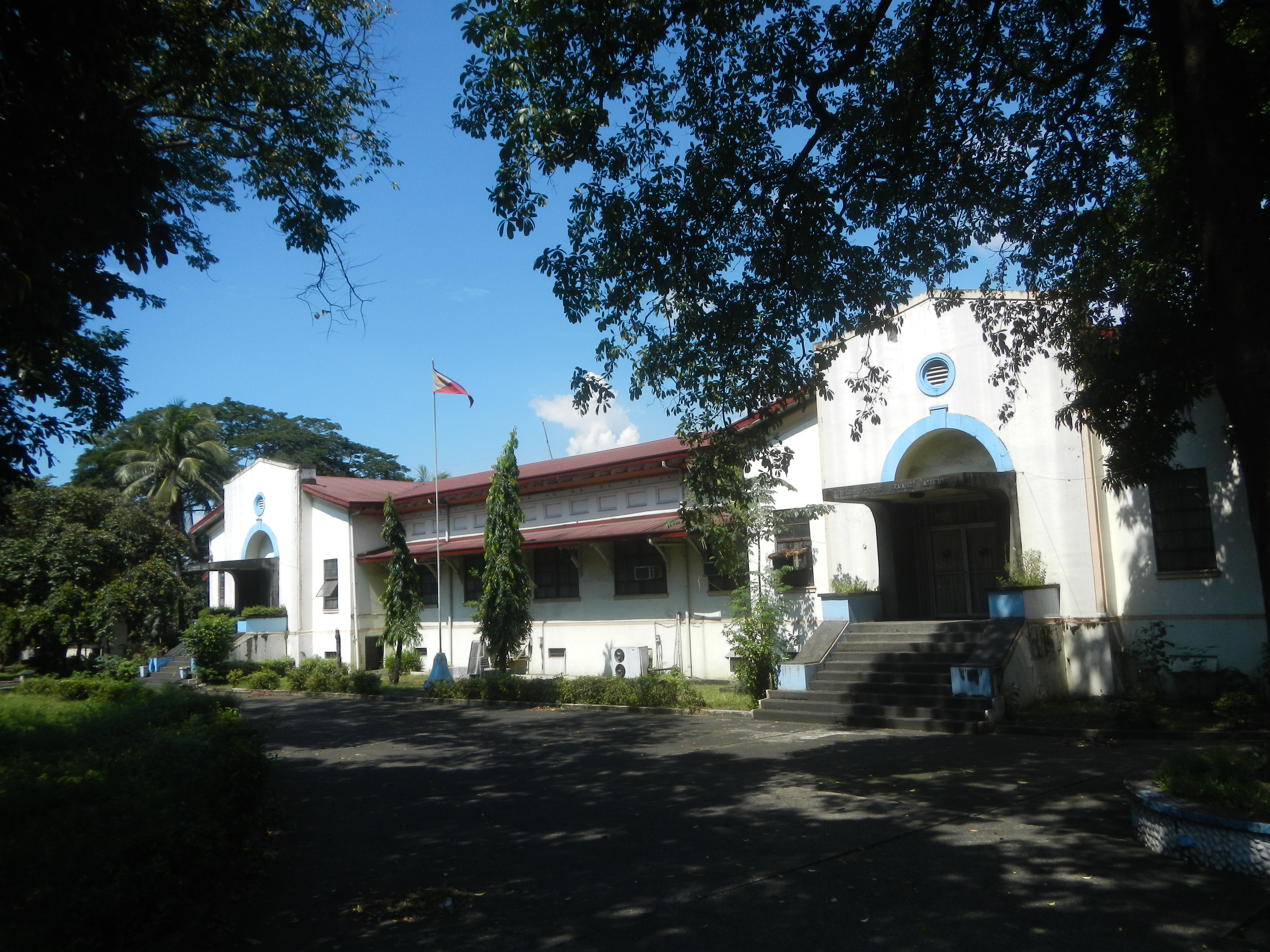
Telecommunications Training Institute (Karuhatan) - ICT Literacy and Competency Development Bureau

=== Initial efforts ===
Several bills in the Philippine Congress have been filed creating a Department of Information and Communications Technology (DICT), which would transform the CICT into an executive department. In the House of Representatives, a consolidated bill, House Bill No. 4300, was approved on third and final reading on August 5, 2008, and transmitted to the Senate on August 11, 2008.

In the Senate, a consolidated bill, Senate Bill No. 2546, was approved by the Senate Committee on Science and Technology on August 19, 2008, but had not made it past second reading by the time Congress adjourned session on February 5, 2010, which means the bill is as good as dead. It will have to be refiled in both the House of Representatives and the Senate in the next Congress. With the failure of Congress to pass the DICT Bill, the legal basis of the CICT remains an executive order, which means the next President can abolish the CICT.

Executive Order No. 47 was signed by President Benigno Aquino III on June 23, 2011. The order states that: "Reorganizing, renaming and transferring the Commission on Information and Communications Technology and its attached agencies to the Department of Science and Technology, directing the implementation thereof and for other purposes." Furthermore, "the positions of Chairman and Commissioners of the CICT are hereby abolished." The BPO stakeholders were surprised with the order and unhappy with the change.

=== Creation ===
The law creating the DICT, Republic Act No. 10844 or "An Act Creating the Department of Information and Communications Technology", was signed on May 20, 2016, during the administration of President Aquino III. Several agencies from other executive departments, notably from the Department of Transportation and Communications (DOTC), dealing with communications functions and responsibilities will either be abolished or transferred to the newly created department. The DOTC will then be renamed "Department of Transportation." The law provides for a 6-month transition period “for the full implementation of the transfer of functions, assets and personnel.” The law took effect on June 9, 2016, which marked the establishment of the DICT.

==== Abolished agencies ====
The functions of the following government agencies have been transferred to the DICT:

- All operating units of the DOTC with functions and responsibilities dealing with communications
- Information and Communications Technology Office (ICTO)
- National Computer Center (NCC)
- National Computer Institute (NCI)
- National Telecommunications Training Institute (NTTI)
- Telecommunications Office (TELOF)

== Programs and Initiatives ==
As of 2025, the Department of Information and Communications Technology has activated tens of thousands of free public Wi-Fi sites nationwide (targeting rural health centers and schools), rolled out thousands of kilometers of national fiber, and integrated digital services through an eGov SuperApp.

== Agencies ==
=== Attached agencies ===
The following agencies are attached to the DICT for purposes of policy and program coordination:

- Cybercrime Investigation and Coordination Center (CICC)
- National Privacy Commission (NPC)
- National Telecommunications Commission (NTC)

== Organizational structure ==
The Department is currently headed by a Secretary with the following Undersecretaries and Assistant Secretaries:

- Undersecretary for Special Concerns
- Undersecretary for Infostructure Management, Cybersecurity and Upskilling
- Undersecretary for Support Services
- Undersecretary for e-Government
- Undersecretary for ICT Industry Development
- Assistant Secretary for Planning and Procurement
- Assistant Secretary for Regional Development
- Assistant Secretary for Infostructure Management
- Assistant Secretary for Consumer Protection
- Assistant Secretary for Management Information Systems Service
- Assistant Secretary for Legal Affairs

== See also ==
- Executive Departments of the Philippines
