= Cebu Monorail =

Proposed monorail in Cebu, Philippines

Cebu Monorail Transit System

Overview
- Owner: Udenna Corporation
- Area served: Cebu Province
- Locale: Metro Cebu
- Transit type: Straddle-beam monorail Airport rail link
- Number of lines: 2
- Number of stations: 20
- Headquarters: Mactan–Cebu International Airport

Operation
- Operator: Philtram Transit Consortium
- Character: Elevated
- Rolling stock: Alstom Innovia Monorail 300
- Train length: 26–100 m (85–328 ft)

Technical
- System length: 27 km (17 mi)
- No. of tracks: 2 monorail beams
- Top speed: 80 km/h (50 mph)

The Cebu Monorail Transit System, simply known as the Cebu Monorail, was a proposed monorail rapid transit system to be built in Metro Cebu, Philippines. Originally proposed by the Japanese in 2015 as the Cebu MRT System, it was revised to a light rail line in the late 2010s, dubbed the Cebu Light Rail Transit System or Cebu LRT. It was then again revised to its present form in late 2019.

The system would consist of two lines, one in mainland Cebu named the Central Line and another leading to Mactan–Cebu International Airport, named the Airport Line. The system was originally set to begin construction in 2021 and to partially open before year-end. The entire system was due to begin operating by May or June 2022. As of February 2021, the project is still awaiting approval from relevant government bodies, but no progress has been made.

== Background ==
The island of Cebu was historically served by the 57 mi (92 km) Cebu Line of the Philippine Railway Company between 1911 and 1942. After World War II destroyed the system, it was never repaired and was eventually dismantled. Since the 1970s, proposals to rebuild the Cebu Line were proposed but none of them came to fruition.

=== Development ===
The first contemporary proposal to rebuild a rail-based public transit system in Cebu was when the Japan International Cooperation Agency (JICA) created The Roadmap Study for Sustainable Urban Development in Metro Cebu and proposed it to the Aquino administration in April 2015. JICA introduced a five-line concept as part of the study. The proposal included four MRT lines: North, South, Central, and Mactan lines, as well as an automated guideway transit line named the AGT-CML Line. The first line to be constructed would have been the AGT-CML Line, with a target completion date of 2021, followed by the MRT Central Line between 2021 and 2030. The other MRT lines were planned to open by 2050.

Proposals for such an MRT system were later abandoned, and the Cebu Light Rail Transit System (Cebu LRT) was introduced by the Cebu City government in 2018. The line was planned to have the same characteristics as Manila LRT Line 1, and was complemented by the Cebu Bus Rapid Transit System and a monorail leading to Lapu-Lapu City in Mactan. The project initially had a targeted opening date of 2020 but it was postponed. On May 26, 2019, plans for the Metropolitan Cebu Development and Coordinating Board to be legally reorganized into the Metro Cebu Development Authority were announced, so it could get better access to resources to fund projects such as the Cebu LRT. The system was then announced to be opened by 2022.

However, the project was again revised to its present form on May 28, just two days after the announcement. Dennis Uy's Udenna Corporation, a Davao City-based company, proposed a monorail instead of a light rail system in 2018. Udenna's infrastructure head, Michael Jamonir stated that a monorail would cost less to construct and operate than an LRT system. As of 2019, the project costs ₱77.57 billion (US$1.53 billion).

Earlier in 2017, the Philtram Transportation Consortium (Philtram) was established. The group comprises Udenna, SYSTRA Philippines, CRRC Nanjing Puzhen, and Bombardier Transportation (later Alstom), among others. By 2020, Philtram announced its interest in building the Cebu Monorail. Department of Transportation Secretary Arthur Tugade announced that both the Cebu BRT and the Cebu Monorail will be complete before the end of 2021. As of October 2021, both the BRT and monorail projects have been delayed beyond the initial 2021 target for partial operability.

== Design ==
The Cebu Monorail would be a fully-elevated monorail system comprising the Central Line and the Airport Line. It will be capable of handling up to 15,000 per direction per hour. The maximum speed in the system will be 80 kilometers per hour (50 miles per hour).

=== Lines ===
==== Central Line ====
The Central Line would be 17.7 kilometers (11.0 miles) long and will have 14 stations. It will connect downtown Cebu City with Talisay. There will also be a connection with the Airport Line somewhere in Cebu City. So far, stations from these areas have been allotted: Talisay, Bulacao, Cebu South Bus Terminal, Kamputhaw, Mabolo and Kasambagan.

==== Airport Line ====
The Airport Line will be 9.3 kilometers (5.8 miles) long and will have six stations connecting Cebu City with Mactan. Its depot will be located near Mactan–Cebu International Airport. None of the stations have been named besides one located in the vicinity of the airport.

==== Extensions ====
There will be an extension of the Central Line to Linao in Talisay City and to Liloan via Mandaue.

=== Rolling stock ===
The system will use the Innovia Monorail 300 series trainsets to be built by Alstom (initially Bombardier). Licensed production will also be conducted by CRRC Nanjing Puzhen of China as part of the Belt and Road Initiative.

According to one of Udenna's partners in the consortium, Jose Guardo's Maglevvision Philippines, the Innovia trainsets will initially use Bombardier's regular monorail technology on prefabricated precast post-tension concrete guide beams. It will be eventually replaced by Guardo's spin-induced Lenz's law magnetic levitation technology. These can also be arranged from 2- to 8-car trainsets from 26 to 100 meters (85 to 328 feet) long.

== See also ==
- Cebu Bus Rapid Transit System
- Davao People Mover — Udenna's monorail counterpart in Mindanao.
