= Dito =

Dito may refer to:

== People ==
- Dito (footballer), Portuguese football player and manager
- Dito Godwin (1955-2021), American record producer
- Dito Montiel, American author, filmmaker, and musician
- Dito Shanidze (1937–2010), Soviet weightlifter
- Dito Tsintsadze (born 1957), Georgian film director and screenwriter

== Other ==
- Dito CME Holdings Corporation
- Dito Telecommunity
