= Badger Hollow Solar Farm =

Solar photovoltaic energy station

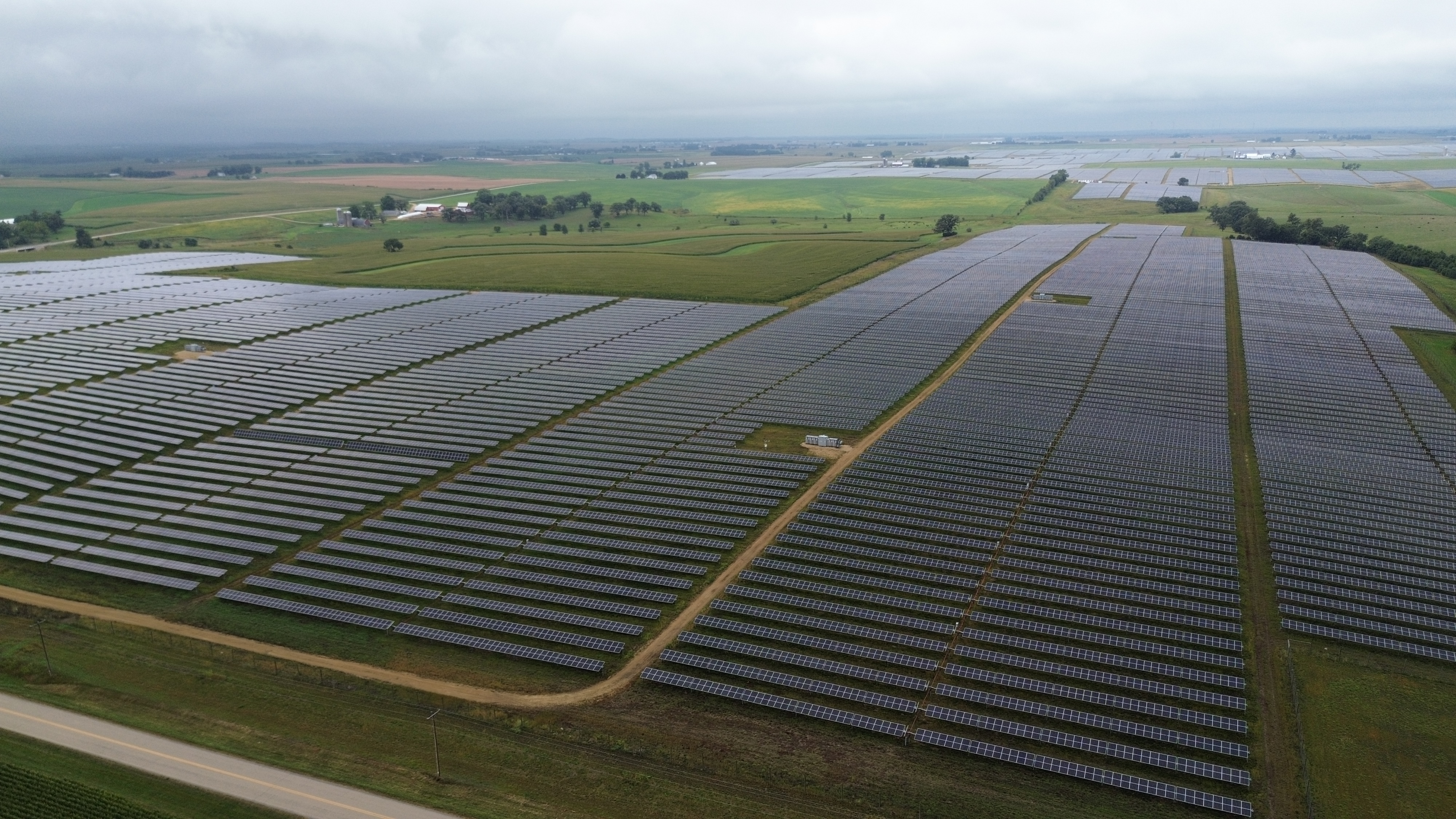
- 42°56'25.8"N 90°18'44.6"W
- Country: USA
- Location: Village of Cobb; Towns of Eden, Mifflin, Linden
- Coordinates: 42°56′25″N 90°18′44″W
- Status: Phase 1 - Commissioned; Phase 2 - Commissioned
- Commission date: November 2021
- Construction cost: $422 Million (As of 1/14/23) $390 (Project Estimate, 2018)
- Owners: MG&E; WEPCO; WPS
- Employees: 17

Solar farm
- Type: Flat-panel PV
- Solar tracker: Single-axis

Power generation
- Units operational: Phase 1 - 150 MW; Phase 2 - 150 MW
- Nameplate capacity: 300 MW
- Capacity factor: 15.07% (2024)
- Annual net output: 396 GWh (2024)

The Badger Hollow Solar Farm is a 300 MW solar photovoltaic energy station in Iowa County in southwestern, Wisconsin. Ownership is shared between Wisconsin Public Service Corporation (WPS), Madison Gas and Electric (MG&E), and Wisconsin Electric Power Company (We Energies), with each utility owning 100 MW. It was the second utility-scale solar plant approved and constructed in Wisconsin.

The sites covers approximately 3500 acres, with between 2000 and 2200 acres used directly for the solar panel arrays. The facility is located in the Village of Cobb and in the towns of Mifflin, Eden, and Linden. It is located just south of Cobb and southeast of the nearby Montfort Wind Farm.

On April 18, 2019, WPS and MG&E purchased and acquired 150 MW of the Badger Hollow solar farm and the electrical tie in line for approximately $389.7 million. This purchase also included the acquisition of the 150 MW Two Creeks Solar Park. The total cost for this agreement was $1,299 per KW, or $194.8 million for the Badger Hollow component. In March, 2020, We Energies and MG&E purchased and acquired the remaining 150 MW of the solar farm for approximately $194.9 million.

As part of project application materials, the facility was expected to require 17 full-time staff once constructed. The facility is eligible for the Federal Solar Investment Tax Credit (ITC). MG&E assumed that the facility would receive 30% of the ITC. The ITC would be normalized over the 30 year life of the project as required by the IRS.

== Background ==
Through an executive order, Governor Tony Evers charged the Office of Sustainability and Clean Energy to achieve a goal that all electricity consumed in Wisconsin by 2050 be 100% carbon-free. According to analysis conducted by the International Panel on Climate Change, the lifecycle emissions of electricity generated by utility-scale solar facilities is 48 gCO2eq/kWh (median value). By comparison, lifecycle emissions from electricity generated from coal and natural gas (combined-cycle plants) are 820 and 490 gCO2eq/kWh, respectively.

The procurement and construction of utility-scale solar has also been justified by some in Wisconsin due to electrical generation supply concerns when several large coal-fired plants in the state were slated to close in the early 2020s. Coal-fired plant closures have since been delayed twice, once to 2025 and then again to the end of 2026 with major utility companies citing electricity reliability concerns and the delay in constructing new grid-scale solar.

== History ==
Badger Hollow Solar Farm, LLC, an affiliate of Invenergy, LLC, submitted a Certificate of Public Convenience and Necessity (CPCN) application to the Public Services Commission of Wisconsin (PSC) on June 1, 2018. On April 18, 2019, the CPCN application to construct the facility was approved by the PSC. In its approval ruling, the PSC found that the project satisfied the requirements of Wisconsin Statute § 1.12 and 196.025(1), known as the Energy Priorities Law.

Major components of Badger Hollow include the PV panels, power conversion units (PCUs), collection lines, a collector substation, and an operations and maintenance (O&M) building.

- Panels: The facility consists of approximately 900,000 to 1,200,000 PV panels on single-axis tracking systems. The panels measure approximately 2 meters by 1 meter and are rated between 335 and 445 Watts (i.e. maximum output). The total DC output rating of the facility is 408 MW.
- PCUs: Inverters and pad-mounted transformers convert the DC output to AC power and step up the power to a 34.5 kV voltage. The capacity of the PCUs is up to 300 MW AC.
- Collector Lines: Approximately 55 miles of lines with 15 feeders.
- Substation: A 34.5 kV/138 kV power collector substation is located on site.

Construction of Badger Hollow Phase I started in 2020 and finished in November 2021. The project was delayed to allow the developer more time in managing the acquisition of the solar panels which was impacted by federal government changes to trade tariffs.

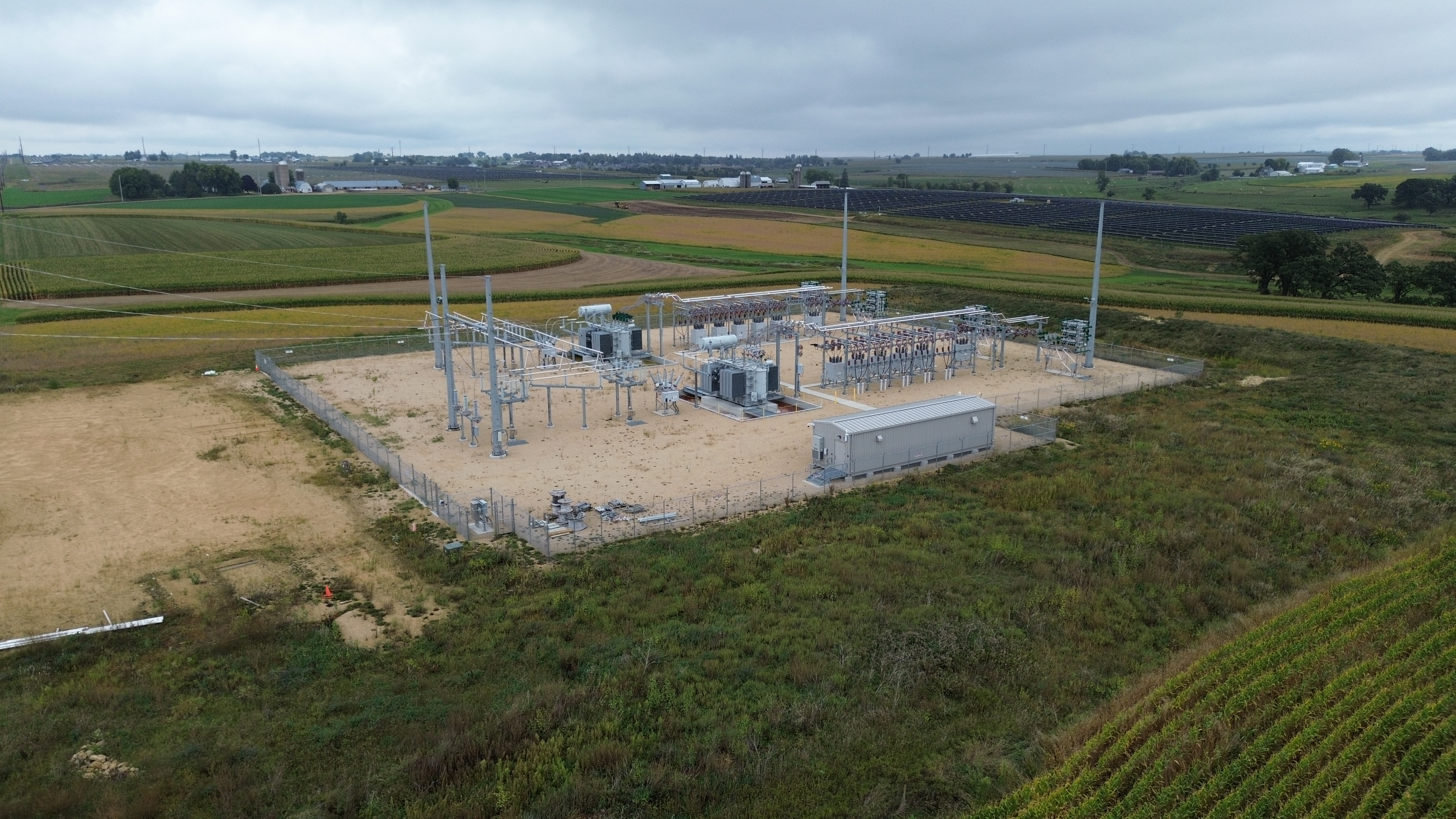
Electrical Substation at Badger Hollow Solar Farm

A 5.7 mile, 138 kV generator tie line was constructed to connect Badger Hollow facility with the existing electric transmission system. The tie line cost $15.6 million and finished full construction in December 2021.

Construction of Badger Hollow Phase 2 (remaining 150 MW) faced time delays and cost overruns due to impacts from COVID-19 as well as US government trade and tariff investigations into solar panel distributors and compliance on the sourcing of materials and labor to produce the panels. Phase 2 entered full operation in December 2023.

== Electricity production ==
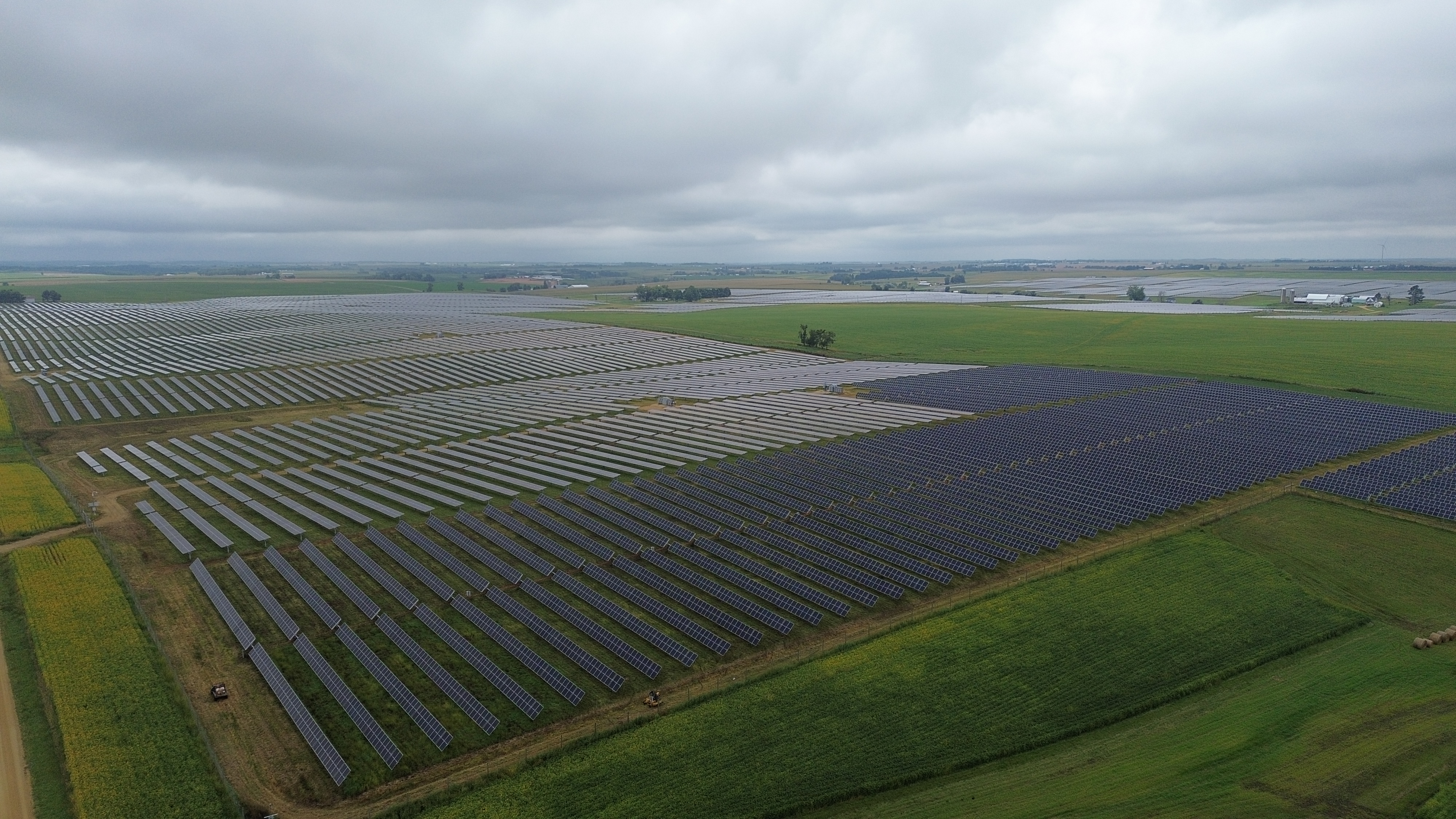
A solar array at Badger Hollow

In 2024, Badger Hollow I and II generated a combined 396 GWh of electricity, approximately 0.62% of the total electricity generated in Wisconsin (63,918 GWh). The combined facility had an approximate annual capacity factor of 15% in 2024, up from 13.3% in 2023 (Badger Hollow I only). While presiding over the transfer of ownership stage, the PSC asked the owners to use an 18% capacity factor for their Electric Generation Expansion Analysis System (EGEAS) analysis.

Generation (MWh) Badger Hollow I Solar Farm
Year	Jan	Feb	Mar	Apr	May	Jun	Jul	Aug	Sep	Oct	Nov	Dec	Annual (Total)
2021	--	--	--	--	--	--	--	--	--	--	5,155	3,094	8,249
2022	10,525	14,055	14,136	16,418	19,528	25,066	27,763	22,936	17,389	15,890	8,983	4,776	197,465
2023	6,642	14,061	13,159	7,511	19,515	20,397	28,019	25,914	13,539	12,588	8,548	4,651	174,544
2024	6,432	15,081	16,748	18,159	24,191	23,587	25,181	25,339	21,275	17,291	1,546	2,285	197,115
2025	10,507	13,161	17,980	18,285	23,007	24,248	24,168	21,914	20,108	14,413			

Generation (MWh) Badger Hollow II Solar Farm
Year	Jan	Feb	Mar	Apr	May	Jun	Jul	Aug	Sep	Oct	Nov	Dec	Annual (Total)
2023	--	--	--	--	--	--	--	--	--	--	--	1,261	1,261
2024	5,319	14,755	16,571	17,197	23,952	22,957	25,244	25,078	22,244	17,384	1,999	6,176	198,876
2025	4,890	13,149	19,296	19,542	23,399	24,364	25,013	23,932	21,078	14,822			
