= Phoenix Petroleum =

Independent oil company of the Philippines

- Formerly: Oilink Mindanao Distribution, Inc. (2002–2004); Davao Oil Terminal Services Corporation (2004–2006)
- Type: Public
- Industry: Oil and Gas
- Founded: May 8, 2002; 24 years ago
- Headquarters: Phoenix Bulk Depot, Lanang, Davao City, Philippines
- Area served: Philippines
- Key people: Domingo T. Uy (Chairman Emeritus); Dennis A. Uy (Chairman); Henry Albert R. Fadullon (President)
- Products: Oil; Natural gas
- Services: Oil refining
- Parent: Udenna Corporation
- Website: www.phoenixfuels.ph

Phoenix Petroleum Philippines, Inc. (PSE: PNX) is the first independent oil company to be listed in the Philippine Stock Exchange after the Oil Deregulation Law was passed in 1998. It is the first company from Davao City to be listed in the Philippine Stock Exchange.

Phoenix is engaged in the business of trading refined petroleum products and lubricants, operation of oil depots and storage facilities, and allied services.

== History ==
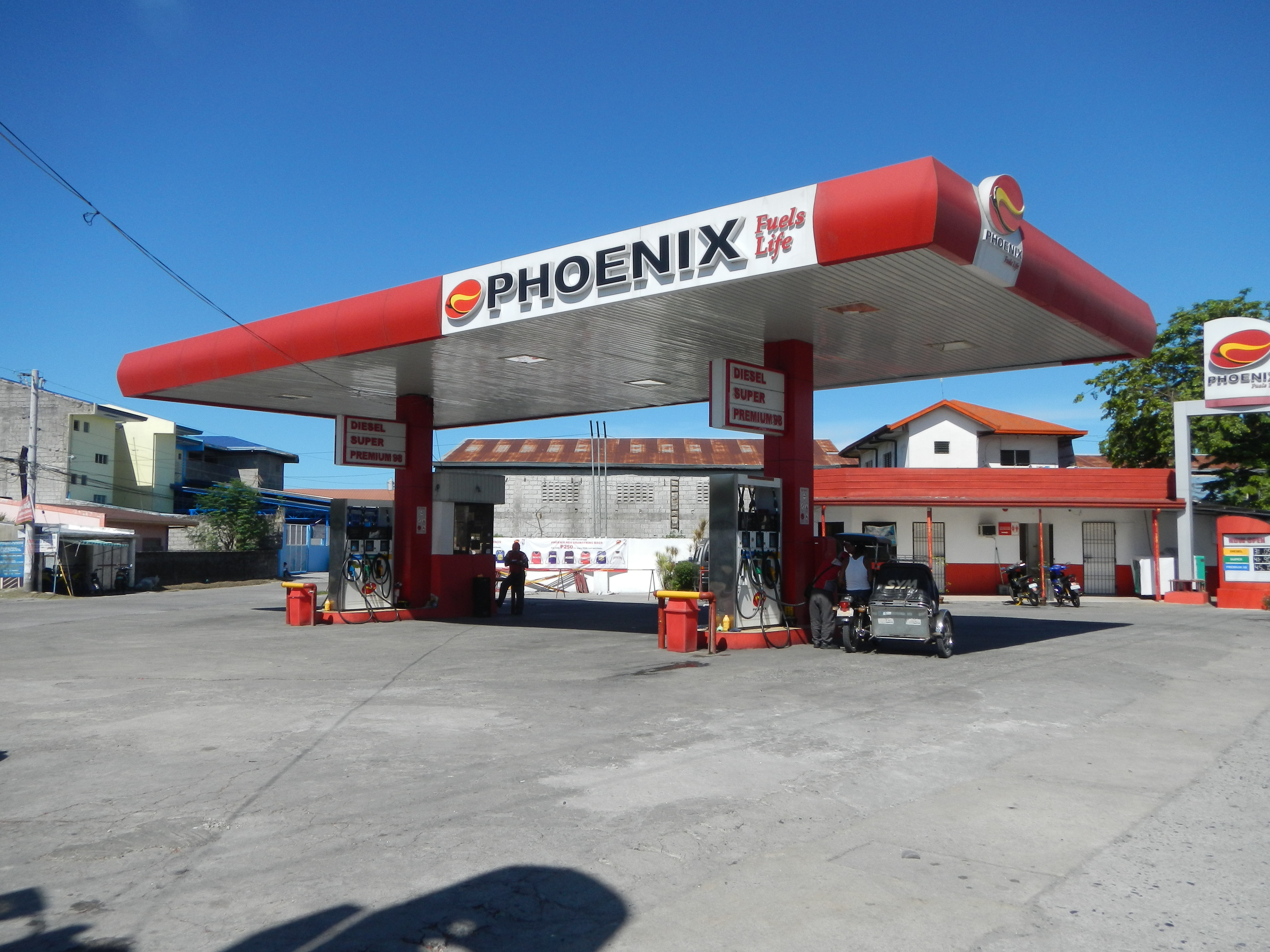
A Phoenix station in Concepcion, Tarlac

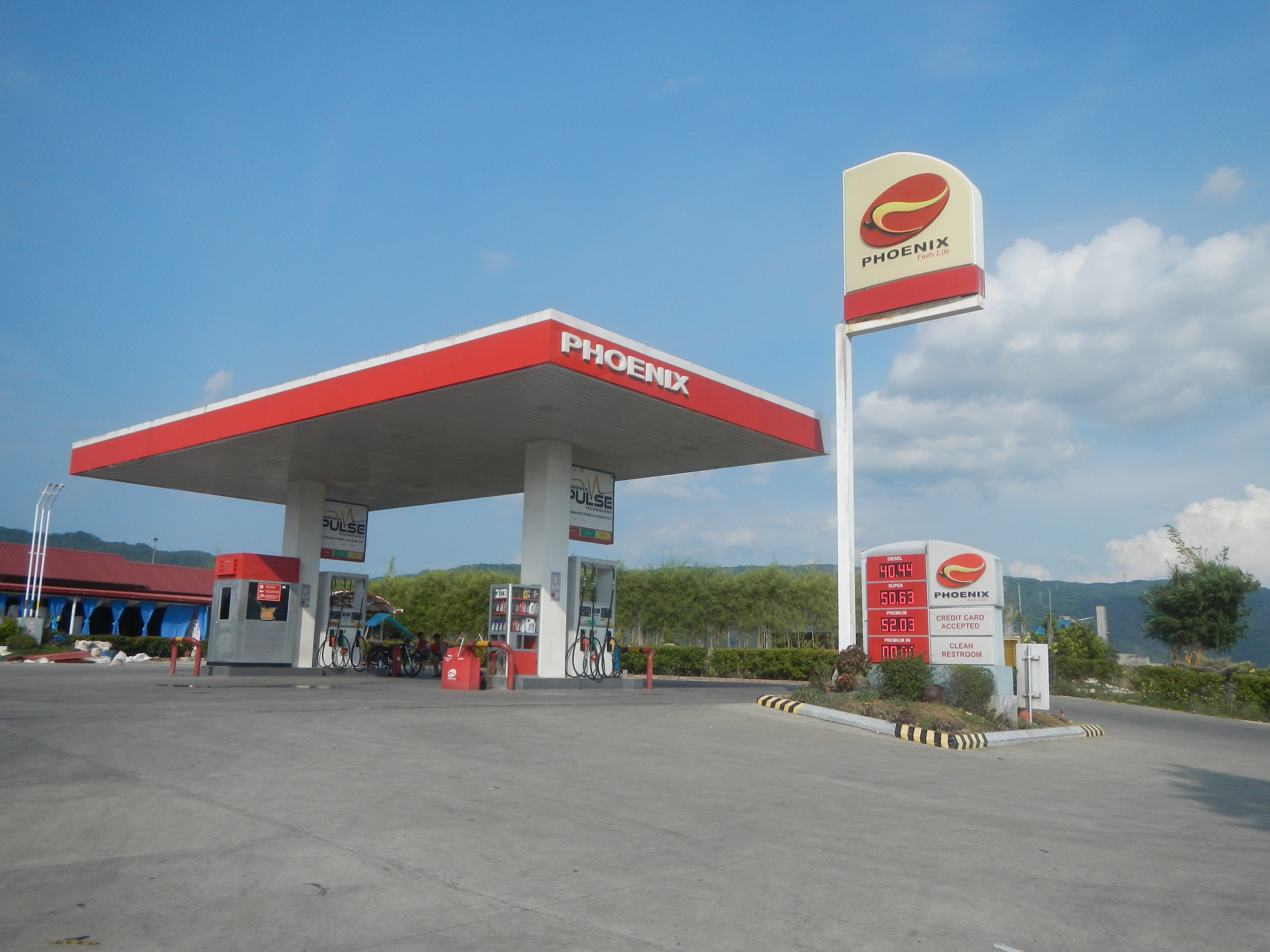
A Phoenix station in Siniloan, Laguna

Phoenix was originally incorporated on May 8, 2002, as Oilink Mindanao Distribution, Inc., and changed its name in January 2004 to Davao Oil Terminal Services Corporation (DOTSCO). The small family business began operations in its current form thereon, distributing petroleum products to various commercial entities in Mindanao.

In 2006, the company was renamed Phoenix Petroleum Philippines, Inc. and introduced lubricants and car care products to its product line.

It became a publicly listed company on July 11, 2007, offering 25% of its total outstanding shares to the public. Phoenix Petroleum became the first independent oil company to be listed on the Philippine Stock Exchange after the Oil Deregulation Law was passed in 1998. Phoenix Petroleum also became the first company from Davao City to go public. In 2008, the oil company opened its first Manila station in Marikina.

The Social Security System acquired up to 9.68 percent stake in Phoenix Petroleum in 2009, from its initial 2.78 percent.

In 2016, Phoenix acquired the franchise of Barako Bull Energy in the Philippine Basketball Association (PBA). Prior to this, Phoenix participated in the PBA D-League in 2016 as the Phoenix Petroleum Accelerators. The Phoenix PBA franchise is playing currently as the Phoenix Super LPG Fuel Masters.

In 2017, Phoenix entered the LPG industry after acquiring Petronas Energy Philippines Inc., which became what is now Phoenix LPG Philippines, Inc.

In 2018, Phoenix has completed its acquisition of the Philippine franchise of the convenience store chain FamilyMart, from Ayala Corporation, Rustan's Group and ITOCHU Corporation. This even led to establishing FamilyMart branches at select Phoenix stations.

On January 22, 2024, Phoenix announced that it temporarily halted importation of diesel and gasoline products since March 2023 due to price volatilities.

By July 27, 2021, Phoenix Petroleum announced the "free gas for life" incentive for Hidilyn Diaz, the first-ever winner of an Olympic gold medal for the Philippines. The announcement came via a statement from the Siklab Atleta Pilipinas Sports Foundation, which is backed by Phoenix Petroleum. On March 12, 2026, however, Hidilyn Diaz's manager said that the 'free fuel for life' incentive had not materialized, with Diaz receiving free fuel for two years only.

== Products and services ==
Terminaling, Hauling and Into-Plane Services

These involve leasing storage space in its terminal depot, hauling, and into-plane services in the cities of Davao, Cagayan de Oro, Cotabato, Zamboanga, and Ozamiz. The Phoenix depots store variety of chemical and petroleum products and are available as bulk storage facilities. The company also operates trucks through Petrologistix Inc., its subsidiary.

Trading, Supply, and Distribution of Fuels

Phoenix offers a range of petroleum products for the different needs of motorists. The company also delivers Phoenix fuels to the client's area and for high-volume accounts, Phoenix sets up pump stations within the client's area of operation.

== Expansion ==
Phoenix Petroleum Philippines, Inc. acquired the 108-hectare (270-acre) Batangas Union Industrial Park in 2007. The Calaca terminal at the industrial park is the largest depot yet of Phoenix and the company's first in Luzon, with its capacity of 50 million liters (13,000,000 U.S. gal). The park is now known as Phoenix Petroterminals & Industrial Park.

The Board of Investments had also granted tax and fiscal incentives to Phoenix for its petroleum product facility in Zamboanga City, a ₱123-million project with a 4.9-million-liter (1,300,000 U.S. gal) storage facility for Phoenix petroleum products. Phoenix has other depots in Davao City, Aklan (New Washington), Surigao del Norte (Claver), Batangas (Calaca), Cagayan de Oro, Cebu (Consolacion), and Bacolod.

== Socioeconomic involvement ==
Through the Phoenix Philippines Foundation, Inc., the company supports and initiates projects in education, health, environment, and outreach.

== See also ==
- Phoenix Fuel Masters
- Udenna Corporation
- Dito Telecommunity
- List of gas station chains in the Philippines
