= Two Creeks Solar Park =

Solar plant in Wisconsin

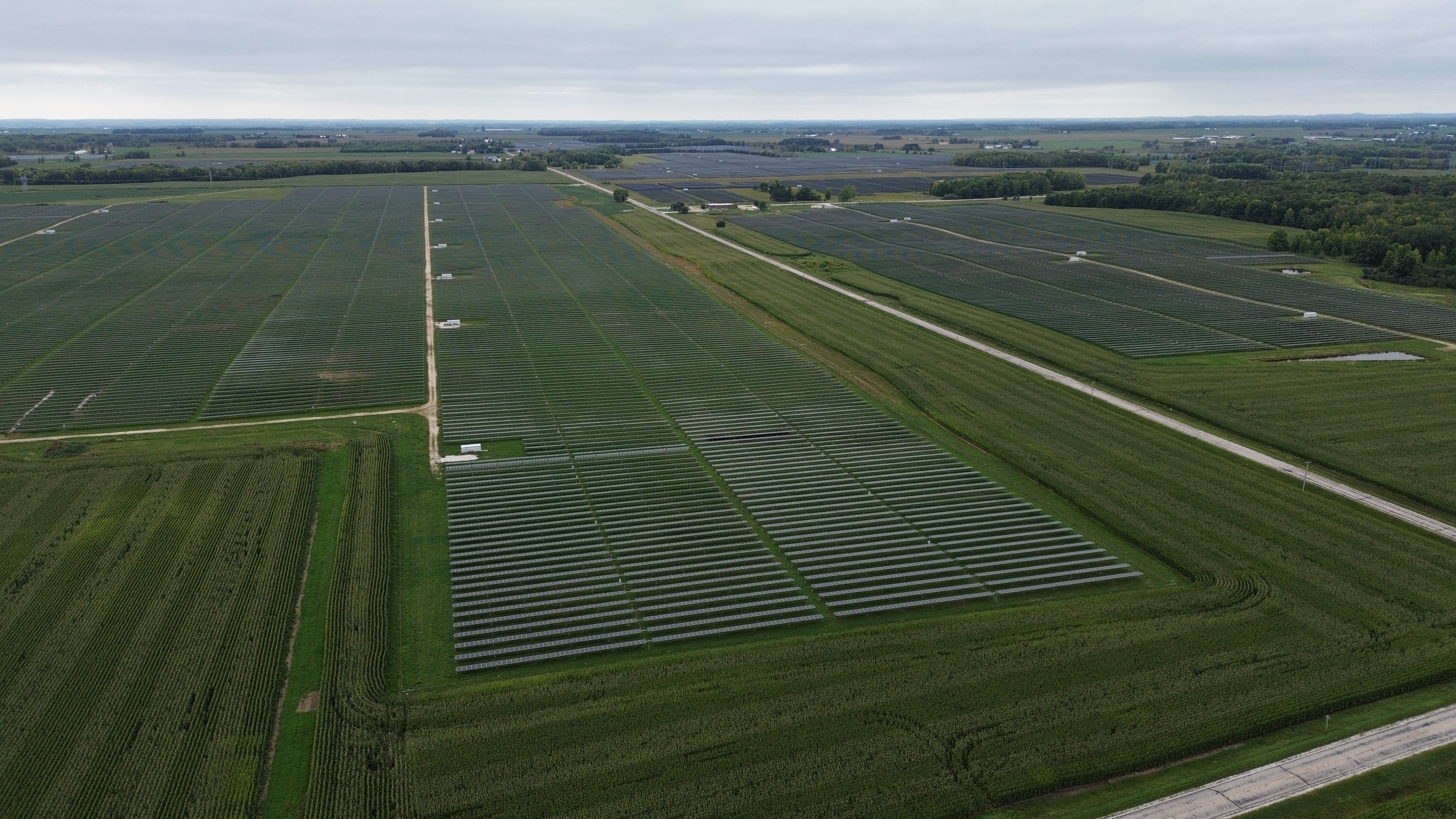
- Country: United States
- Location: Town of Two Creeks & Town of Two Rivers
- Coordinates: 44°14′52″N 87°32′36″W
- Status: Commissioned
- Construction began: Q4 2019
- Commission date: Nov 2020
- Construction cost: $195 Million
- Owners: WPS & MG&E
- Employees: 3

Solar farm
- Type: Flat-panel PV
- Solar tracker: Single-Axis

Power generation
- Nameplate capacity: 150 MW
- Capacity factor: 15.2% (2024)
- Annual net output: 199 GWh (2024)

The Two Creeks Solar Park is a 150 MW solar photovoltaic energy station in Manitowoc County, Wisconsin. Ownership is shared between Wisconsin Public Service Corporation (WPS) and Madison Gas and Electric (MG&E), at 100 MW and 50MW, respectively. It was the first utility-scale solar plant approved and constructed in Wisconsin.

The facility consists of approximately 533,000 PV panels on single-axis tracking systems. PV panels are Jinko Eagle HC mono-crystalline measuring approximately 2 meters by 1 meter and rated at 400 watts (i.e. maximum output). The total DC output rating of the facility is 213 MW. The facility covers approximately 800 acres within the towns of Two Creeks and Two Rivers, southwest of the nearby Point Beach Nuclear Plant.

Construction for the plant was completed in November 2020 at a cost of $195 million. As part of project application materials, the facility was expected to require three full-time staff once constructed. The facility is eligible for the Federal Solar Investment Tax Credit (ITC). The ITC is normalized over the 30 year life of the project as required by the IRS.

== History ==
Two Creeks Solar, LLC submitted an engineering plan to the Public Services Commission of Wisconsin (PSC) on March 20, 2018, and an application for a Certificate of Public Convenience and Necessity (CPCN) on May 31, 2018. On May 31, 2019, the CPCN application to construct the facility was approved by the PSC. In its approval ruling, the PSC found that the project satisfied the requirements of Wisconsin Statute § 1.12 and 196.025(1), known as the Energy Priorities Law.

A groundbreaking ceremony was held in late August 2019 featuring Governor Tony Evers and senior executives from MG&E, WPS, WEC, and Next Era Energy Resources LCC. At the time, a spokesperson for WPS stated that the Two Creeks plant, along with the Badger Hollow Solar Farm in southwestern Wisconsin, would save $100 million over its lifetime. Construction formally started later in 2019 and by July 2020 half of the panels had been installed. An estimated 300 people were required to construct the facility, mostly in the form of installing support posts and racking the panels. The facility started generating electricity in November 2020.

The PSC approved MG&E and WPS's purchase and acquisition of the solar park from Two Creeks Solar (an entity of NextEra Energy Resources, LCC) for approximately $1,299 per kW for a total project cost of $195 million. The PSC denied MGE and WPS's request for authorization to acquire Two Creeks at a cost of up to 110 percent of the $195 million cost, which would have covered allowance for funds used during construction (AFUDC).

== Electricity Production ==
In 2024 Two Creeks generated 199 GWh, approximately 0.3% of the total electricity generated in Wisconsin (63,918 GWh). The facility had an approximate annual capacity factor of 15.2% in 2024, up from 14.6% in 2023. A capacity factor of 24% was used during the economic analysis during the transfer of ownership stage.

Generation (MWh) Two Creeks Solar Park
Year	Jan	Feb	Mar	Apr	May	Jun	Jul	Aug	Sep	Oct	Nov	Dec	Annual (Total)
2020	--	--	--	--	--	--	--	--	--	--	8,837	4,568	13,405
2021	5,508	15,428	17,514	19,017	22,339	25,736	27,087	23,884	19,253	9,865	8,067	3,120	196,818
2022	7,583	9,861	15,136	15,312	23,380	25,563	26,583	23,210	17,862	14,015	7,876	3,423	186,381
2023	4,450	11,565	16,707	17,220	24,606	25,744	27,610	24,137	16,241	10,699	9,454	4,467	192,900
2024	4,846	11,800	15,745	19,679	25,288	23,097	27,065	22,835	21,803	16,862	6,135	4,531	199,686
2025	9,245	8,045	17,152	18,330	23,345	21,995	26,939	23,473	18,446	13,746			

== Repower Cost Analysis ==
As part of their application to purchase the facility, MG&E and WPS conducted an economic feasibility analysis. The analysis indicated it would cost between $90 million to $180 million (2018 dollars) to repower the facility, that is to replace the existing solar panels with new solar panels. Solar panels experience degradation over time due to ultraviolet light and weather, reducing the efficiency and electrical output of the panel. Repowering aims to increase the output efficiency of a solar facility by replacing some or all of the photovoltaic panels.
