= 2018 Philippine third telecommunications provider bidding =

- Date: November 7, 2018
- Type: Bidding
- Theme: Telecommunications
- Cause: Duopoly of PLDT, Inc.–Smart Communications and Globe Telecom, the alleged cause of poor telecommunication services in the Philippines, particularly slow but expensive internet service
- Organized by: Department of Information and Communications Technology; National Telecommunications Commission
- Participants: Mislatel, SEAR Telecom, and PT&T
- Outcome: Mislatel named as "provisional new major player" on November 7, 2018. Mislatel relaunched as Dito Telecommunity

A bidding was held in November 2018 to determine the prospective third major telecommunications service provider in the Philippines which is meant by the Philippine government to compete with the existing duopoly of PLDT, Inc.–Smart Communications and Globe Telecom.

The winning firm or consortium was granted a certificate of public convenience and necessity and six radio frequency bands by the Philippine government which would help establish a third major player in the Philippine telecommunications industry.

The Mislatel consortium led by Udenna Corporation and China Telecom was named the provisional winner of the bid on November 7, 2018.

== Background ==
The Philippines' telecommunication industry is dominated by the duopoly of PLDT, Inc.–Smart Communications and Globe Telecom. The situation has been cited by critics of the duopoly as the reason for the country's poor internet infrastructure and the country has consistently ranked at the bottom-tier among countries in terms of internet speed. In 2016, President Rodrigo Duterte has urged the two established telecommunications to improve their services and said that he would allow the entry of new competitors if they refused to comply. In his third State of the Nation Address in 2018, Duterte has directed the DICT and the NTC to name the third telecommunications provider before the end of that year saying that the firm should selection process should be fair, reasonable and comprehensive.

A report by Open Signal, a wireless coverage mapping firm, released in November 2017, conducted a study on Long-term Evolution (LTE) technology in 77 countries where the Philippines ranked 69th in LTE availability and 74th in LTE speeds.

Majority of the radio frequency spectrum in the Philippines has already been assigned to either PLDT Inc. and Globe Telecom by the National Telecommunications Commission leaving only less than a third of frequency spectrum available to a potential major telecommunications provider although the Department of Information and Communications Technology (DICT) has said that the prospective telco provider can still operate in the country and noted that as of October 2018 that there is a pending bill in the Congress which seeks to redistribute unused spectrum frequencies by PLDT and Globe to other companies.

President Duterte has invited Chinese firms to enter the bid a move which has been described as a "political decision" by then Presidential spokesperson Harry Roque.

== Format ==
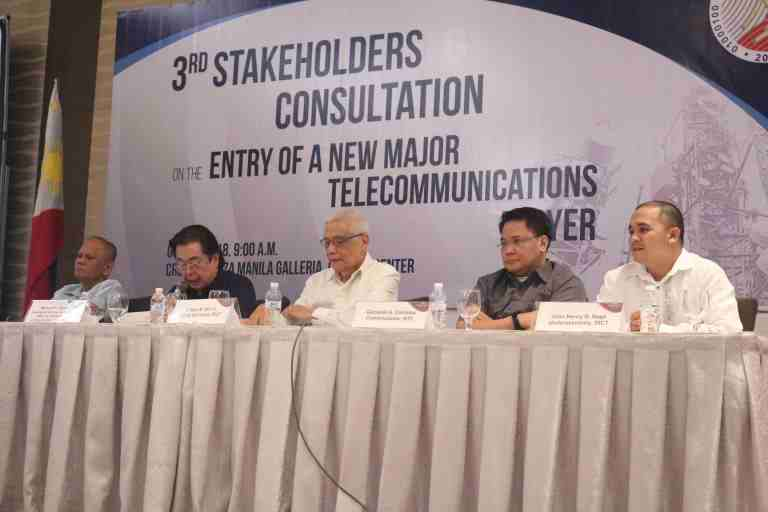
Third Stakeholders Consultation on the third telecommunications provider bidding. July 6, 2018.

The bidding for the third major telecommunications provider in the Philippines was overseen by the Department of Information and Communications Technology (DICT), the National Telecommunications Commission (NTC) and an oversight committee. The highest committed level of service (HCLoS) selection model was adopted for the bidding with three selection criteria: national population coverage, minimum average broadband speed and capital and operational expenditures.

The selection model was selected after a vote by 15 telecommunication companies in an impromptu survey during the third stakeholders consultation organized by the DICT on July 6, 2018. All but 2 companies favored the HCLoS model over the more traditional auction model.

The final terms of reference was published by the DICT through Memorandum Circular 09-09-2018 on September 21, 2018, allowing interested firms to acquire bidding documents at ₱1 million each from the NTC starting October 6, 2018 with the deadline of submitting documents set on November 5, 2018, and by the same day participating firms as well as the "provisional new major player" would already be announced. A selection committee was to process the bidding documents of the provisional new major players and if the bid was ascertained to be valid, the company will be declared as the third telecommunications player. The winning company will have to submit prerequisite documents for the Certificate of Public Convenience and Necessity within 90 days from the issuance of the confirmation order.

=== Selection criteria ===
1. Minimum average broadband speed (25.0%)
2. National population coverage (40.0%)
3. Annual capital and operational expenditure (35.0%)

The three selection criteria and their weight for the HCLoS selection process are:

- Minimum average broadband speed (25%) – internet speeds of at least 5 megabits per second (Mbps) must be provided by the winning company or consortium. One point was to be awarded per year for every 2 Mbit/s extra committed by the bidding company up to a minimum average speed of 55 Mbit/s at most.
- National population coverage (40%) – The winning company or consortium must be able provide service to 50 percent of the national population by the end of the fifth year after it won the third telecommunications provider slot or a 10 percent of annual increase in national population coverage for five years. At the maximum, the winner should cover 50% during the first year up to 90% by the fifth year.
- Annual capital and operational expenditure (35%) – At least ₱40 billion or a maximum of ₱140 billion must be invested by the winning company or consortium in the first year and ₱25 billion for the succeeding four years; for a total of ₱140–240 billion after five years.

The bidding parties' offered commitments were judged based on the three selection criteria over a five-year commitment period which was used as a basis of their rankings

=== Bidder eligibility ===
Bidding companies must fulfill the following four eligibility requirements:

- Minimum paid-in capital of ₱10 billion
- At least 10 years of experience in delivering telecommunications services on a nationwide scale
- No relationship to the dominant telecommunication service providers (PLDT-Smart and Globe Telecom) and no outstanding liabilities with regulators
- Bidders can be a single domestic firm or a consortium holding a congressional franchise to install, operate, and maintain telecommunications networks and services

As per the terms of reference of the bid, the winning bidder are discouraged to have plans of merger or enter into a joint agreement with the existing two dominant players PLDT Inc. and Globe Telecom. If they do so they are required to return awarded frequencies back to the NTC.

PT&T questioned the national scale requirement for bidding companies which was defined by the terms of reference of the bidding process as "the provisioning, delivery, and operations of telecommunications services for a country, or particular regions thereof." which it said allows foreign bidders with regional operations to participate while requiring local firms to have operations nationwide in Luzon, Visayas, and Mindanao which it deemed as discriminatory to local firms.

Foreign companies are allowed to submit bids by themselves but must partner with a local company once it commence operations in the country.

Participating companies and consortium are also subjected to fees to ensure their financial capability to compete with the existing telecommunication players.

- ₱700 million – participation security
- ₱14–24 billion – performance security
- ₱10 million – non-refundable appeal fee

One of the companies which expressed interest to participate in the bid, NOW Telecom filed a petition before the Manila Regional Trial Court Branch 24 against the NTC which seeks for an issuance of a writ of preliminary injunction. since bidders are required to put up a ₱700 million participation security, ₱14−24-billion performance security, and a ₱10 million non-refundable appeal fee. The court rejected the petition to nullify the financial provisions and found such as reasonable saying that these needed to ensure that the third major provider will have financial capability to compete against Globe and PLDT.

=== Bidding stakes ===
The winning bidder will be awarded:

- A Certificate of Public Convenience and Necessity (CPCN) which has a validity of either 15 years or the length of the winning bidder's existing franchise, whichever is shorter
- Six radio frequency bandwidth – 700 megahertz (MHz), 2100 MHz, 2000 MHz, 2.5 gigahertz (GHz), 3.3 GHz, and 3.5 GHz.

== Bids ==
=== Uninterested firms ===
The following are companies which has expressed non-interest in participating in the bid.

- Telstra – Telstra initially planned to form a consortium with San Miguel Corporation (SMC) in 2016 but negotiations broke down and SMC sold its telecommunications asset to Globe and PLDT. In 2018, Telstra said that it has no interest to enter the mobile telecommunications market in the Philippines, consequentially the bid though it considers the Philippines an "important market" and maintains a customer service hub in the country.

=== Expressed interest ===
The following has expressed interest in participating in the bid but decided not to submit their bids for various reasons.

- AMA Telecommunications – Amatelco, a subsidiary of the AMA Education System backed by Middle-Eastern firms bought bidding documents on October 31, 2018, from the NTC. The firm is a holder of a 25-year congressional franchise on telecommunications which was granted in July 2016.
- Converge ICT / Korea Telecom – Converge initially expressed interest to participate in the bid but withdrew such plans on November 7, 2018, due to what it alleges an absence of a level playing field. It criticized the selection process of requiring bidders to commit certain minimum internet speed, coverage, and capital noting that existing players Globe and PLDT were not subjected to such requirements and questioned the involvement of a Chinese state-owned company speculating that the requirements may be ignored if their bid does not fulfill the given bid criteria. It planned to form a consortium with South Korean firm Korea Telecom which claims in 2018 to have been the first telecom provider to introduce 5G broad-scale trial service.
- Mobitel – a company owned by the A1 Telekom Austria Group.
- Now Corporation – NOW Corp expressed interest to participate but found the financial requirements of the bid as a "money making scheme" due to the bidding's monetary requirements. NOW Corp. decided not submit the bid on the November 7 bidding deadline as per advise of their legal team but remains open to filing its bid if legal remedies would allow them.
- Streamtech – a newly incorporated company by the Villar Group with a 25-year franchise granted by the administration of President Rodrigo Duterte. In April 2018, the Villar Group announced plans to diversify and was considering investing in various industries such as the gaming and telecommunications industries. They decided not to pursue a bid after internal discussions of the management.
- Telenor – the Norway-based company, which already maintains presence in Malaysia, Myanmar, and Thailand, planned to participate in the bid with a local company. It announced in late-September that it was holding talks with potential local partners. It has touted its 4G and 5G technology services as its biggest advantage over other potential bidders. Telenor did not submit a bid.

=== Submitted bids ===
There were three submitted bids:

- Mislatel – A consortium of a franchise holder, Mindanao Islamic Telephone Company, Inc. which consists of its locally based companies, Udenna Corporation and its subsidiary, Chelsea Logistics, and Chinese state-owned firm China Telecommunications Corporation, a parent company of China Telecom. Udenna at the time of the bidding was not a player in the telecommunications industry and Mislatel already has a franchise granted in 1998 although it has been dormant in the telecommunications industry.
- Sear Telecom (TierOne and LCS Inc.) – A consortium of LCS Holdings of politician Chavit Singson and TierOne Communications International backed by Chinese firm Fujian Torch Electron Technology, Singaporean company Miller Pte. Ltd., and Cambodia-based Southeast Asia Telecom. LCS Group of Companies through Gracia Telecoms and TierOne already doing business in Mindanao. They entered the bidding to augment their expansion plans. The consortium touts itself as the only bidder planning to use Satellite Internet access by deploying portable Wi-Fi hotspots connected via satellite. In an event they fail to win the bid, they still plan to become a major telecommunications provider in the country.
- Philippine Telegraph and Telephone Corporation (PT&T) – A broadband service provider in Luzon which provides its services through a 10,000 km (6,200 mi) pure fiber cable network. In November 2017, the company has announced that it entered with negotiations with China Telecom and Datang Telecom Technology regarding plans to form a consortium for its bid. It was a major competitor of PLDT in the 1990s prior to the 1997 Asian financial crisis. It is the internet service provider of the Armed Forces of the Philippines.

== Result ==
The Mislatel consortium led by Udenna Corporation and China Telecom was named the "provisional new major player" on November 7, 2018. The other two submitted bids by the SEARS Telecom consortium and PT&T were disqualified after the NTC alleged that they have submitted incomplete bidding documents. Both losing parties plans to file an appeal to the NTC. The NTC said that PT&T failed to meet technical requirements it has set for bidders.

The Sear Telecom consortium questioned the eligibility of the Mislatel consortium saying that it breached an alleged existing and exclusive binding agreement between the Mislatel franchise and Tier1. The Mislatel consortium insists its bid was valid said that the agreement meant for "small projects" was already terminated and the said agreement did not made any reference to the third telecommunications provider bid. This is refuted by Digiphil, as demonstrated by the documents between the two, and an Enforcement of Contract proceeding is underway in the Pasig Court.

Mislatel was granted permission to operate in July 2019 and was renamed as Dito Telcommunity.
