= Dennis Uy =

Filipino businessman and diplomat

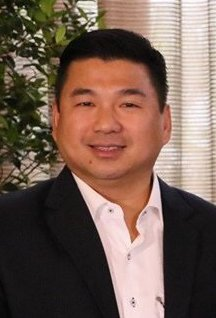
- Uy in 2019
- Born: Dennis Ang Uy; September 26, 1973 (age 52); Davao City, Philippines
- Education: De La Salle University
- Occupation: Business magnate, diplomat
- Known for: Founder and owner of Phoenix Petroleum
- Spouse: Cherylyn Chiong
- Children: 3

Dennis Ang Uy (Chinese: 黃書賢; Pe̍h-ōe-jī: Oîⁿ Chu-hiân; pinyin: Huáng Shūxián; born September 26, 1973) is a Filipino businessman and diplomat. Uy is the founder of Udenna Corporation, which has stakes in various businesses including Phoenix Petroleum.

== Early life and education ==
Dennis Ang Uy was born and raised in Davao City to an ethnic Chinese family based in Davao, which is part of the Uys' third generation. Uy's grandparents, Ega Uy and Tao Sui Eng were ethnic Chinese who settled in Davao as merchants. They had a store which sold fishing equipment and bread while his parents ran a small business which sold copra.

He is the eldest among siblings. According to his own account, Dennis played basketball as a childhood hobby while at the same time sold school supplies and basketball cards to his classmates.

In 1993, Uy studied in De La Salle University in Manila to pursue a Bachelor of Science in Business Management degree and started to trade in the stock market. Since he had an average academic performance by his own account he decided against being a lawyer and described himself to be poor in memorization to consider pursuing a career in law.

== Career ==
=== Business career ===
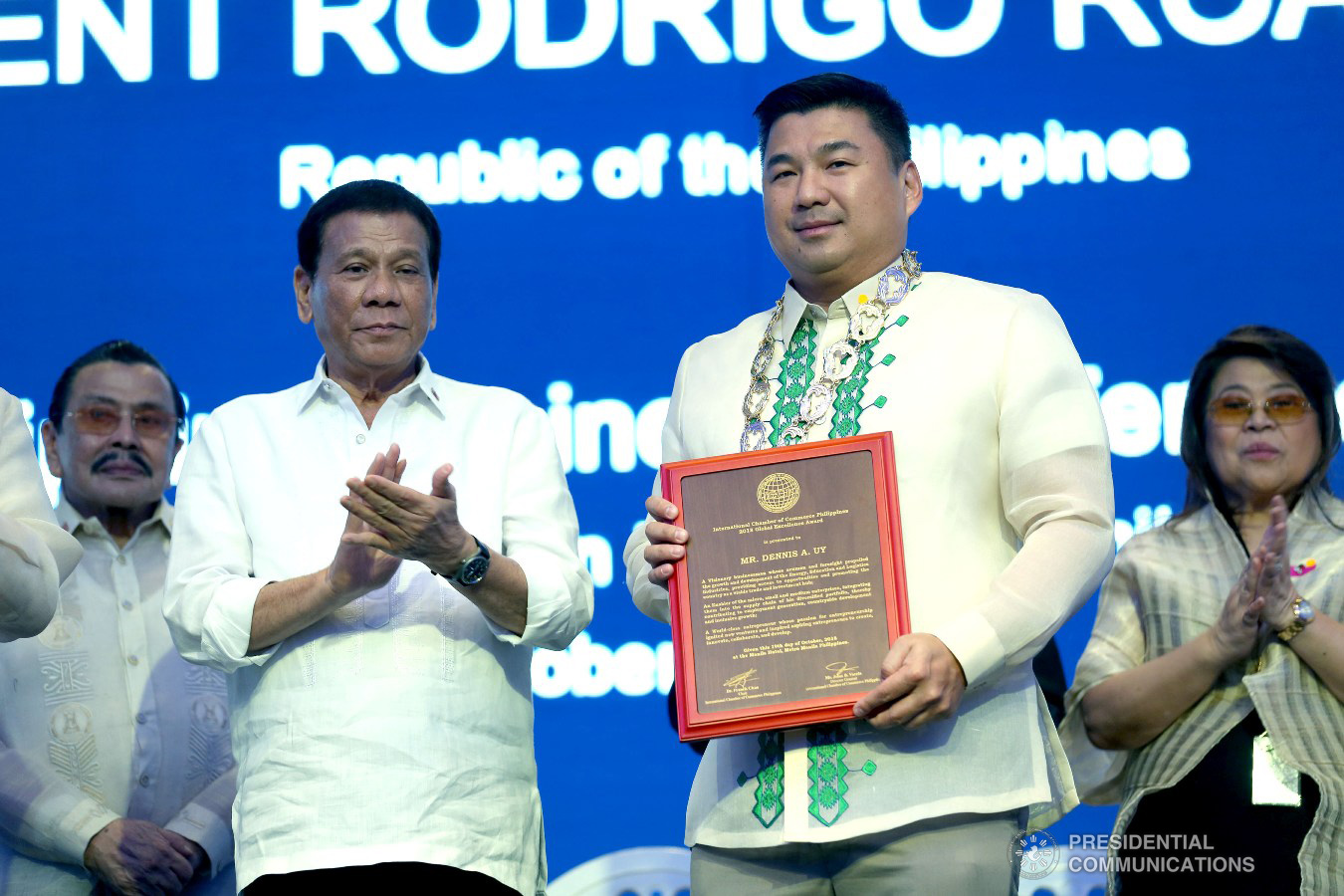
President Rodrigo Duterte applauds after awarding the International Chamber of Commerce (ICC) Global Excellence Award to Udenna Corporation President Dennis Uy

After finishing his tertiary education, Dennis Uy helped ran his family's business and interacted with older businessmen. His family's business was based in Tagum, and was involved in mining, supermarkets, car dealership among other industries. Uy worked with his family for ten years and at one point ran seven firms simultaneously. He decided to start his own business to gain independence as he felt that he did not have the freedom he aspired for himself working for his family.

He started his own business using income he gained from trading stocks while he was still in college and set up Dencio's Kamayan, a barbecue store (which shares the same name but unrelated to a Manila-based restaurant chain). He started his business portfolio independently without the aid of his family members. The barbeque chain grew to at least eight outlets before handing over the business to his sister when he decided to focus on participating in the petroleum industry. He also operated two community newspapers which served Davao City but both became defunct.

In 2002, he along his wife founded Udenna Corporation, a holdings company that would later manage his business interests in various industries. Within the same year, Phoenix Petroleum then known as the Oilink Mindanao Distribution Company was established. In 2004, the company was renamed as Davao Oil Terminal Services Corp. (DOTSCO) As part of this business, Uy set up a six million-barrel oil terminal serving businesses in the Davao region. Phoenix Petroleum adopted its name in 2006 and was listed in the Philippine Stock Exchange in 2007 and became the first Davao City-based company to join the stock market.

He founded Chelsea Logistics Holdings Corp. (CLHC) which is involved in the shipping and logistics industry, and a passenger ferry company.

In 2016, Uy's Udenna Corporation had various acquisitions. Udenna secured permission from the Philippine Amusement and Gaming Corporation to develop a casino resort in Mactan, Cebu. It also entered the liquefied petroleum gas (LPG) industry and acquired Enderun Colleges.

In November 2017, Udenna took over the development of the former Global Gateway Logistics City at the Clark Freeport Zone in Pampanga which was later relaunched as Clark Global City. And in 2018, a consortium between Udenna's Mislatel (now called as Dito Telecommunity) and China Telecom won the government-sanctioned bidding that would allow the consortium to become the third major telecommunications provider in the Philippines challenging the duopoly of PLDT and Globe Telecom.

In 2018, he bought 70% of ownership of Conti's Bakeshop and Restaurant.

Forbes estimated Uy's 2020 net worth at $650 million, ranking him as the Philippines' 22nd-richest.

Dennis Uy's Udenna Corporation bought 100 million common shares of Atok-Big Wedge Co. Inc., where Uy is a director and vice chairman. Atok-Big Wedge Co, Inc. a listed corporation in PSE, has 20% ownership of United Kingdom-based Forum Energy Ltd. which has the right of oil exploration in SC72 in the South China Sea. Forum Energy Ltd. has an ongoing talks with China for joint oil exploration after President Duterte– a close friend of Dennis Uy– lifted the moratorium on oil exploration.

In September 2024, Uy sold Conti's Bakeshop & Restaurant and Wendy's Philippines, with his Eight8Ate Holdings Inc., to entrepreneur Crystal Jacinto.

In August 2025, it was confirmed that his publicy-listed company PH Resorts, Inc. (PSE: PHR) lost its land and built-up assets in Cebu for the planned "Emerald Bay Casino and Resort" project, to lender Chinabank, and is further mired in billions in debt/capital deficiency.

=== International business connections ===
Uy has been the honorary consul to Kazakhstan since November 2011. and is tasked to develop the bilateral ties of the Philippines with the Central Asian nation.

=== Government Service career ===
Uy was appointed in 2016 as the Presidential Adviser on Sports Development by then President Rodrigo Roa Duterte.

=== Involvement in sports ===
Uy through his company Phoenix Petroleum, owns a franchise in the Philippine Basketball Association. The team known as the Phoenix Super LPG Fuel Masters joined the PBA in 2016 as the Phoenix Fuel Masters after buying the Barako Bull Energy franchise. He is also the team's board governor. On July 18, 2016, Uy was appointed by then-President of the Philippines and ally Rodrigo Duterte as the presidential adviser for sports.

== Personal life ==
Dennis Uy is married to Cherylyn Chiong who is a graduate of La Salle Academy, Iligan in high school and Business and Finance from the Ateneo de Davao University with whom he has three children; two daughters and a son. He is also a close friend of former Philippine President Rodrigo Duterte and was a major donor to Duterte's presidential campaign in 2016.

== Controversies ==
=== Graft complaint against Uy and his complaints against ABS-CBN ===
In 2021, a graft complaint was filed before the Ombudsman against Uy, Alfonso Cusi and several others over the sale of Chevron's investment in the Malampaya project to Udenna Corporation, wherein the anomalies allegedly resulted in losses to the government. Uy later filed cyberlibel complaints against ABS-CBN Corporation, whose news organization had reported on a complaint against him, claiming that the latter's articles were libelous. The Davao City Office of the Prosecutor, in its resolution dated May 5, 2022, dismissed these complaints for lack of probable cause, saying that the articles were not defamatory.

=== Phoenix Petroleum smuggling case ===
On April 24, 2013, the Department of Justice charged Uy for alleged illegal importation of petroleum products. The charges were dismissed in 2021.
