= Dito CME Holdings Corporation =

Dito CME Holdings Corporation (DITO CME)
- Formerly: Itogon-Suyoc Mines, Inc. (1925–2002); ISM Communications Corporation (2002–2020)
- Company type: Public
- Traded as: PSE: DITO
- Industry: Conglomerate (investment)
- Founded: January 1925; 101 years ago (as Itogon-Suyoc Mines, Inc.); March 2020; 6 years ago (as Dito CME Holdings Corporation)
- Headquarters: 21/F Udenna Tower, Rizal Drive corner 4th Avenue, Bonifacio Global City, Taguig, Metro Manila, Philippines
- Area served: Philippines
- Key people: Dennis Uy (Chairman); Ernesto R. Alberto (President); Donald Patrick Lim (Chief Operating Officer)
- Services: Telecommunications; Information technology
- Revenue: ▲ ₱16.35 billion (2024)
- Operating income: ▼ ₱−41 billion (2024)
- Net income: ▼ ₱−41.01 billion (2024)
- Total assets: ▲ ₱218.93 billion (2024)
- Total equity: ▼ ₱−73.39 billion (2024)
- Owner: Udenna Corporation; Summit Telco Corporation Pte. Ltd. (8.14%); Summit Telco Holdings Corporation (16.89%)
- Subsidiaries: DITO CME Ventures; Udenna CME; UNA Technologies; Dito Telecommunity
- Website: ditocmeholdings.ph

Dito CME Holdings Corporation (formerly known as Itogon-Suyoc Mines, Inc. and ISM Communications Corporation) is a Filipino conglomerate holding firm and the parent company of Dito Telecommunity. Formed in 1925, the company primarily engages in telecommunications and information technology infrastructure.

== History ==
=== The early years ===
Itogon-Suyoc Mines, Inc. was founded in January 1925 as a mining company. During the 2000s, the company (which subsequently renamed as ISM Communications Corporation in April 2002) began diversified with the investments in different industry sectors such as telecommunications (a stake in Eastern Telecommunications Philippines, later divested in 2011), gaming and hospitality (a 65% stake in Acentic GmbH), and banking (a 97% stake in Philippine Bank of Communications, sold to Lucio Co), before it became a holding company in 2016.

=== Dennis Uy era ===
In August 2018, businessman Dennis Uy bought a 45% controlling stake in ISM, and in March 2020, the firm was renamed as Dito CME Holdings Corporation.

In November 2020, Dito CME announced its share swap deal with Uy's Udenna Corporation to indirect owning its stake in telecommunications company and its namesake, Dito Telecommunity. As part of a deal, Dito CME will own a 100% stake in Udenna's subsidiary, Udenna CME Holdings Corporation which co-owns (along with another Udenna subsidiary, Chelsea Logistics) one of Dito's parent companies, Dito Holdings Corporation (the other is the Chinese state-owned China Telecommunications Corporation). The deal made Udenna Corporation became as a parent company of Dito CME.

In June 2021, Dito CME (through its subsidiary, ISM Equities Corporation (now DITO CME Ventures, Inc.)) signed a sales-and-supply agreement with Samsung Electronics Philippines.

In July 2021, Dito CME announced its partnership with Alibaba Cloud to provide cloud computing and storage products for its digital educational platform, Luna Academy.

In January 2022, Dito CME dropped the Rights offering of US$156 million for the expansion in Philippines citing the reason of "less than ideal market conditions."

In 2025, Singapore-based Summit Telco and its parent Summit Telco Holdings bought stakes in Dito CME.
