= Davao People Mover =

Overview
- Status: Proposed
- Owner: Government of the Philippines
- Locale: Davao City, Philippines
- Termini: Bangkal; SM Lanang Premier
- Stations: 16

Service
- Type: Straddle-beam monorail
- Operator(s): Udenna Corporation
- Daily ridership: 100,000 (projected)

Technical
- Line length: 13 km (8.1 mi)
- Number of tracks: 2

The Davao People Mover is a proposed 16-station 13 km (8.1 mi) monorail line to be built in Davao City, Philippines.

== History ==
The Davao City government requested for a Korean firm to operate a light rail system in the city, following the success of the Manila Light Rail Transit System. The Korean firm recommended to build a monorail instead of a true light rail system. It was first announced to the public on October 23, 2018.

== Design ==
The line will be 13 kilometers (8.1 mi) long and will begin near the intersection of Pan-Philippine Highway and Davao–Cotabato Road (known locally as MacArthur Highway). It will traverse the latter road to Davao Poblacion where it will pass by City Hall. It will also pass through a number of roads in the area before aligning with J.P. Laurel Avenue until it ends near SM Lanang Premier. Construction for the line will cost around ₱30 billion (US$600 million). It was expected to begin construction by 2020 and be complete by 2022. As of March 2019, the line is still waiting for government approval as counter proposals had to be considered.

=== Stations ===
The line will have 16 stations which are located 700–800 meters (2,300–2,600 ft) apart. The western terminus, Bangkal, will have a bus connection to the Mintal railway station of the Mindanao Railway's Davao City–Digos section. Stations will be built near University of Mindanao – Matina Campus, Ateneo de Davao University – Jacinto Campus, and near Davao City Hall. The eastern terminus will be located near SM Lanang Premier. The locations of the other 12 stations are to be disclosed.
