= Dito Telecommunity =

Telecommunications company in the Philippines

- Logo used since 2020
- Formerly: Mindanao Islamic Telephone Company (1998–2019)
- Type: Subsidiary
- Industry: Telecommunications
- Founded: Davao City, Philippines; April 19, 1998; 28 years ago
- Headquarters: Udenna Tower, Bonifacio Global City, Taguig, Metro Manila, Philippines
- Area served: Philippines
- Key people: Dennis A. Uy (Chairman) and Ernesto R. Alberto(CEO)
- Products: Call and Text messaging services, Mobile internet
- Revenue: ▲PH₱16.3 billion (2024)
- Net income: ▼PH₱−14.7 billion (2024)
- Owner: Dito CME Holdings Corporation (60%); China Telecommunications Corporation (40%)
- ASN: 139831
- Website: www.dito.ph

Dito Telecommunity Corporation (stylized as DITO), formerly known as Mindanao Islamic Telephone Company, Inc. or Mislatel, is a telecommunications company in the Philippines which is also engaged in the business of multimedia and information technology. It is a consortium of DITO CME Holdings Corporation, a subsidiary of the Udenna Corporation which is owned by Davao businessman Dennis Uy, and China Telecommunications Corporation, a state-owned enterprise of the government of mainland China and a parent company of China Telecom.

The consortium is known as the sole winner of the government-sanctioned bidding that would allow the consortium to become the third major telecommunications provider in the Philippines challenging the duopoly of PLDT and Globe Telecom.

DITO Telecommunity began its commercial operations on March 8, 2021. It offers commercial wireless services through its 4G LTE, and LTE-A networks, with 5G currently being deployed in key locations in the Philippines. As of August 2023, DITO's total mobile subscriber base stands at 7.74 million. DITO gave out a free data allocation of 1 gigabyte for each subscriber when it hit a million customers three months after its official rollout.

== History ==
=== Early years as Mislatel ===
The DITO Telecommunity's history can be traced back to the establishment of Mindanao Islamic Telephone Company, Inc. (Mislatel), which is enacted by Congressional legislation on April 19, 1998, under Republic Act No. 8627, allowing the franchise to construct, install, establish, operate and maintain a telecommunication system throughout the Philippines.

=== Third major telecommunications provider bid ===
In 2018, it was announced that Mislatel was one of the telecommunication firms to join the government-sanctioned bidding, allowing the winner to become the third major telco provider in the Philippines, challenging the duopoly of PLDT and Globe. Mislatel became a joint-consortium between Udenna Corporation, its subsidiary Chelsea Logistics, and the Chinese state-owned and parent company of China Telecom, China Telecommunications Corporation. The consortium was finally named as the "provisional third major player" by the NTC, beating out two other firms, Sear Telecom consortium and PT&T in the bidding.

The Senate and the House of Representatives approved the transfer of ownership of Mislatel to the latter's consortium. In June 2019, the consortium's stakeholders completed a share-purchase agreement with Mislatel, and were then awaiting their permit to operate, tentatively by July 2019.

The consortium paid a ₱25.7 billion performance bond to the government as it committed to provide internet service with a speed of 200 megabits per second to more than a third of the population on its first year of operation.

=== Relaunch as DITO ===
Dito Telecommunity logo (2019–2020)

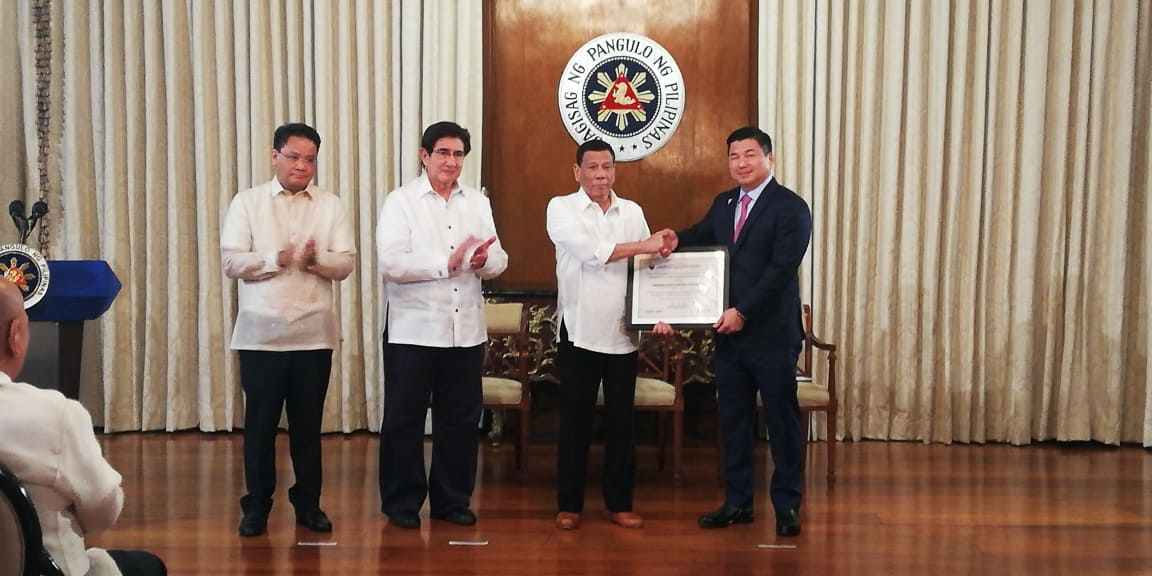
President Rodrigo Duterte awards the company its Certificate of Public Convenience and Necessity.

On July 8, 2019, Mislatel was renamed as DITO Telecommunity. DITO was derived from the Filipino word for "here", which is a response to the stakeholders' question on where they plan to set up a firm that would provide a "world class service" with "here" referring to the Philippines, the country where DITO Telecommunity is based in.

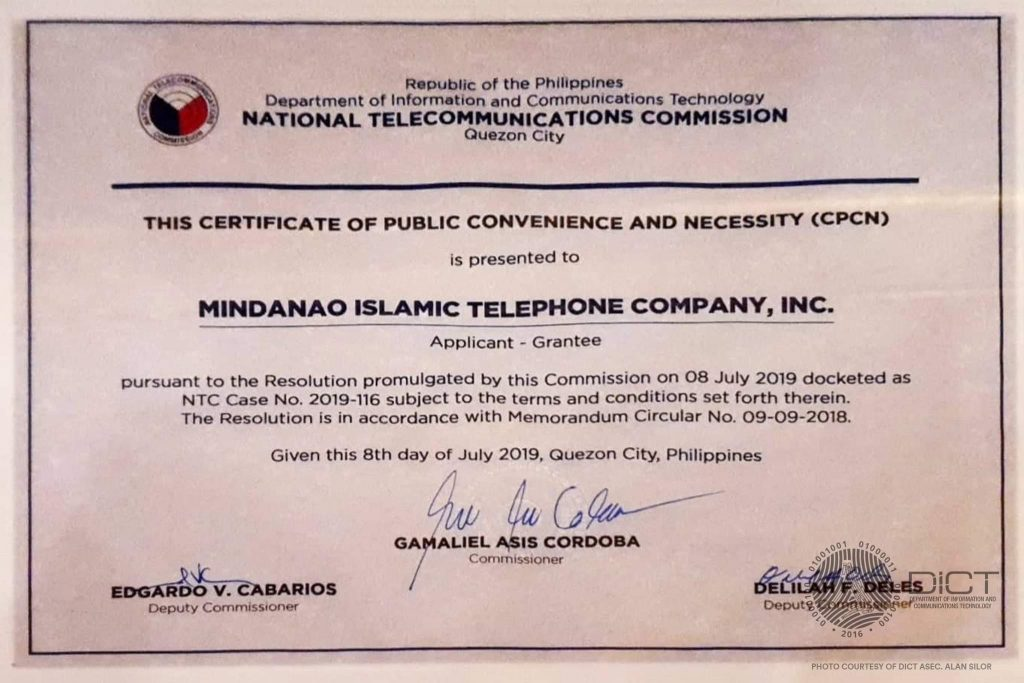
Certificate of Public Convenience and Necessity of the company.

At the same date of the announcement of the company's renaming, DITO Telecommunity was granted its permit to operate after Philippine President Rodrigo Duterte awarded the Certificate of Public Convenience and Necessity by the National Telecommunications Commission to its chairman Dennis Uy during a ceremony at the Presidential Palace, Malacañang.

On September 6, 2019, DITO announced its plans to build its own campus on an 8-hectare (20-acre) lot at Clark Global City. The campus will house the company's own data center and will hold DITO's operational departments, network operations center, call center, and regional center. It will also serve as the hub for DITO's research and development in the telecommunications space. DITO began the construction of its campus on April 13, 2021.

In October 2019, DITO signed separate deals with Lopez-owned Sky Cable Corporation and politician Luis Chavit Singson's LCS Group. Under the deal with LCS Group, DITO will lease the shared telco towers that LCS had already built in several areas. While on the other hand of the deal with Sky Cable, DITO will utilize the latter's unused fiber-optic cables in Metro Manila.

By March 2020, two months ahead of schedule, the first domestic and international calls from the company's network were made. On July 18, 2020, the company had its technical launch. The technical launch means that the DITO network will be ready for technical audits from the National Telecommunications Commission (NTC). The company passed its first technical audit in February 2021. As of September 2020, DITO has completed 859 cell sites out of the planned 1,600 sites that will cover 37% of the population.

On February 23, 2021, Dito and PLDT signed an interconnection deal to enable subscribers from the two companies to communicate in their respective networks. DITO and Globe Telecom also signed an interconnection deal on February 24, 2021.

=== Start of operations ===
DITO began its commercial operations on March 8, 2021, in 15 selected areas in Visayas and Mindanao (particularly in Metro Cebu and Metro Davao). The company decided to focus on the rollout of its mobile services first, and offered 4G LTE before moving to 5G technology in 2021.

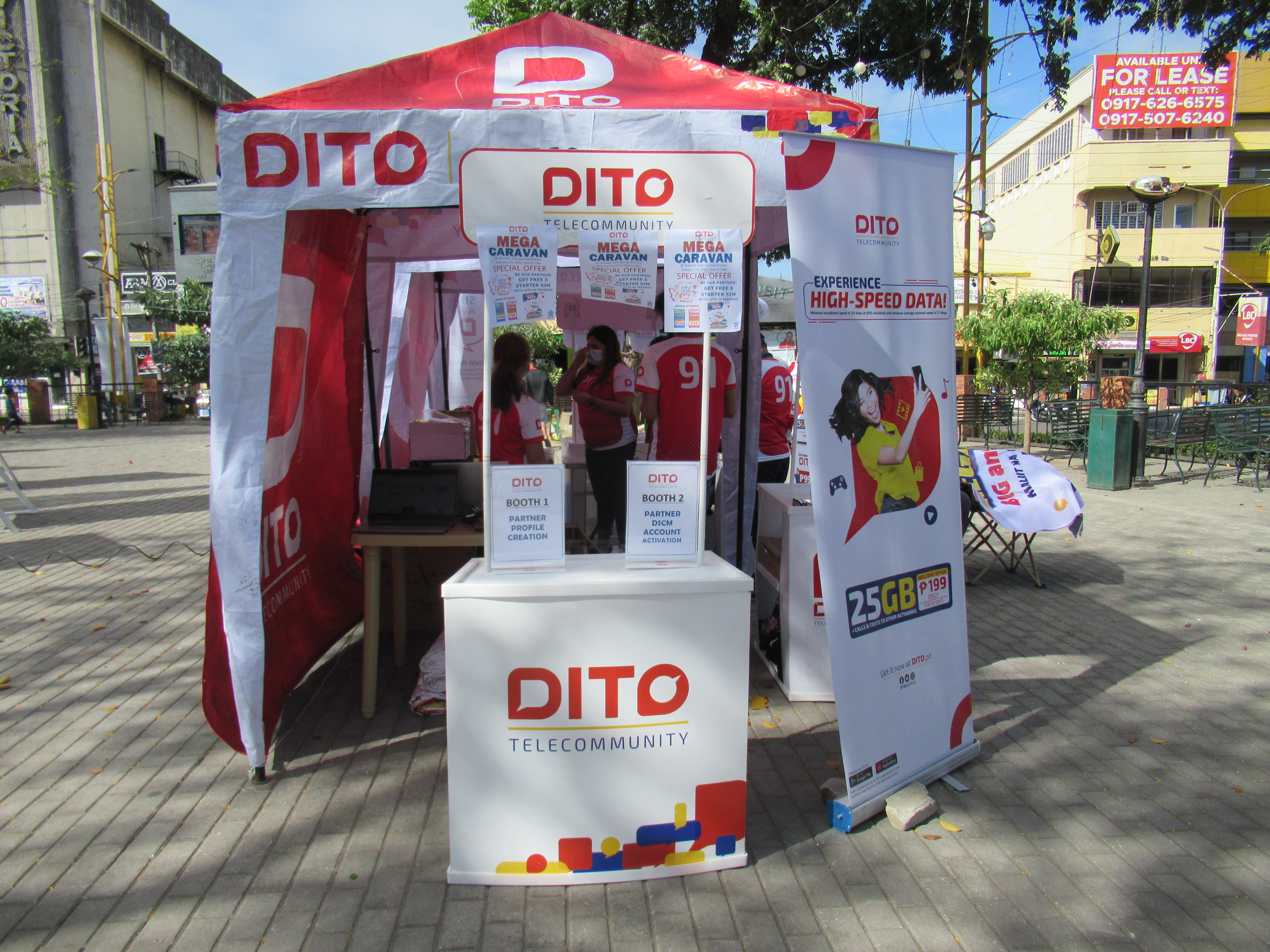
Dito Telecommunity workers selling SIM cards at temporary tent-shops at Glorietta Park, Baliwag, Bulacan in early 2022

From April to May 2021, DITO expanded its services to select areas in Luzon provinces (initially in five provinces covering a total of 18 cities and municipalities) and in Metro Manila. On May 18, 2021, President Duterte signed Republic Act No. 11537, renewing DITO's license for another 25 years and granting the company a franchise to construct, establish, install, maintain and operate wire and/or wireless telecommunications systems in the Philippines. A few days later, Dito selected Nokia to deploy its 5G services in Mindanao.

On June 29, 2021, DITO announced that it has partnered with non-banking financial firm M Lhuillier to expand the reach of the former's products and services nationwide.

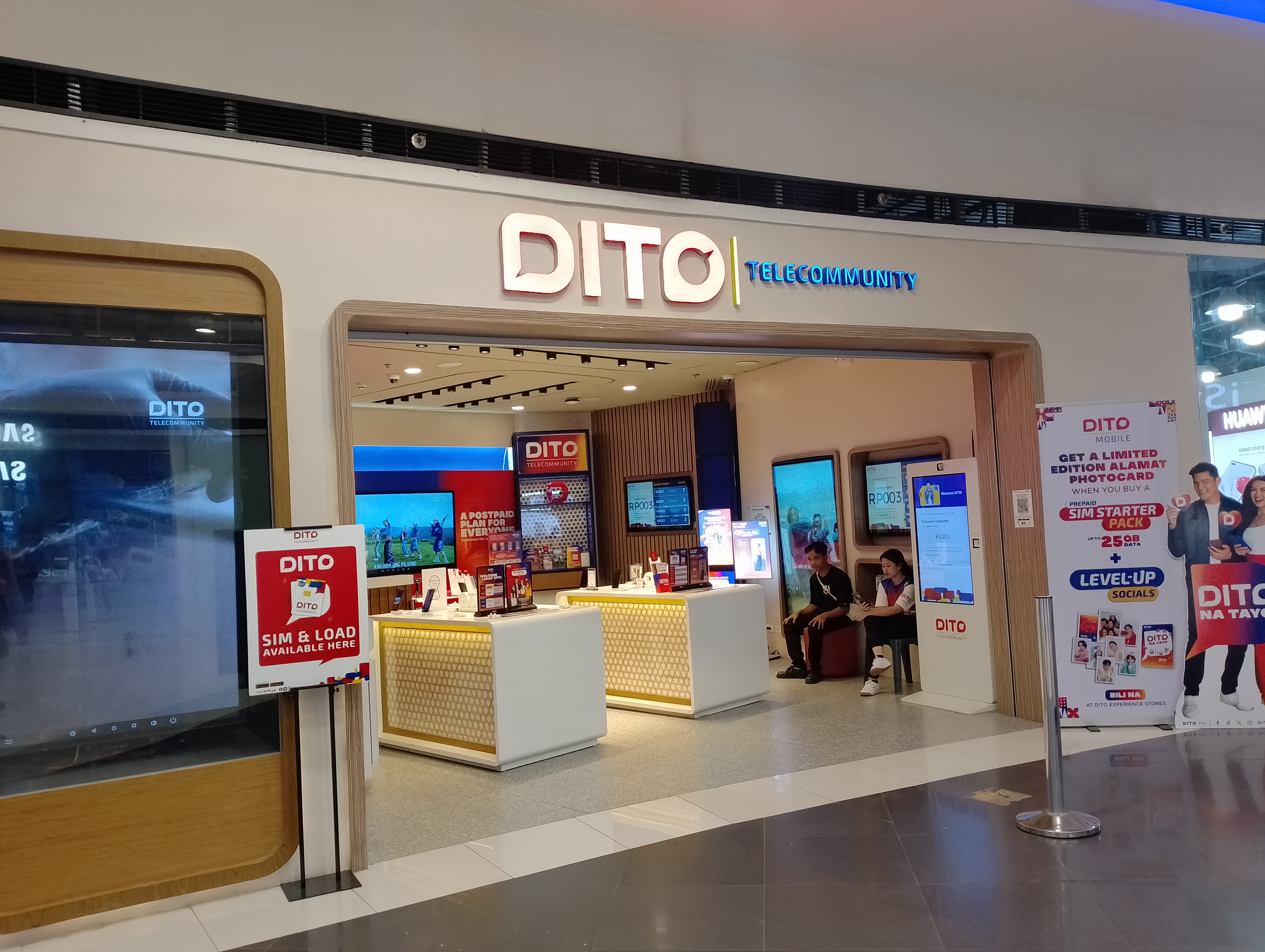
Dito Experience Store at SM City Cebu

On February 28, 2022, DITO launched its pilot broadband in Metro Manila.

As of February 14, 2024, the service is currently available in 61 out of 82 provinces in the country: 31 in Luzon, 12 in Visayas, and 18 in Mindanao.

On February 27, 2024, DITO obtained the Rated #1 Mobile Network place in the Philippines at the Ookla Speedtest Awards 2023 from CEO Stephen Bye during the Mobile World Congress in Barcelona. It achieved a rating of "3.6 in based on comprehensive data collected from July 1 to July 31, 2023," Ookla said.

In Opensignal's April report, on internet speed contest, DITO outplaced Smart Communications and Globe Telecom in the first quarter, with a download speed of 32 Mbps. It is also now the fastest operator for 5G, averaging 302.9 Mbit/s as against Smart's 143.3 Mbit/s. In the reliability experience of subscribers, it further scored 835 out of 1,000 to breaking Smart's 771 and Globe's 748.

In October, in partnership with Huawei, DITO offered a home network powered by 5G RedCap Wi-Fi to reach 100 Mbps.

== Subscribers ==
Before the implementation of the SIM Registration Act, DITO had 14 million subscribers in 2022, exceeding the 12-million target subscriber base. On July 30, 2023, DITO registered 7,740,556 subscribers after unregistered SIM cards were deactivated by virtue of the SIM Registration Act. As of March 6, 2025, Dito subscribers reached 14 million across the country.

== Controversies ==
=== Complaint against Globe Telecom and Smart Communications ===
On August 8, 2022, the company filed a complaint against duopolies Globe Telecom and Smart Communications at the Philippine Competition Commission for an alleged "anti-competitive practices" and "abuse of market dominance".

On August 9, 2022, Globe Telecom has asked the National Telecommunications Commission to pay the interconnection penalty of ₱622 million to DITO for "breach of agreement".

=== Complaint against ARTA ===
In 2022, DITO Chief Administrative Officer Adel Tamano filed a complaint accusing five former officials of the Anti-Red Tape Authority, including Director General Jeremiah Belgica, of violating the Anti-Graft and Corrupt Practices Act (Republic Act No. 3018) for giving preferential treatment to Now Telecom in a dispute over frequencies.

Ombudsman Samuel Martires, in an order dated October 25, 2022, signed on March 3, 2023, and only publicly released in July, convicted the five of grave misconduct, dismissing them from service, cancelling their civil service eligibility and retirement benefits, and barring them from holding public office.

== Ownership ==
The following are the stockholders of DITO Telecommunity (as of November 2020):

Direct	Indirect	% of stake
DITO Holdings Corporation (Udenna Corporation)	Udenna CME (DITO CME); Chelsea Logistics and Infrastructure	60%
China Telecommunications Corporation		40%

== Radio frequency summary ==
Frequencies used by DITO Telecommunity
Frequency	Protocol	Class	Band Number	Duplex Mode	Common name
700 MHz	LTE/LTE-A/LTE-A Pro	4G	28	FDD	APT
2100 MHz	LTE/LTE-A/LTE-A Pro	4G	1	FDD	IMT
2500 MHz	LTE/LTE-A/LTE-A Pro	4G	41	TDD	BRS
3500 MHz	NR	5G	n78	TDD	C band

== See also ==
- DITO CME Holdings Corporation
- China Telecommunications Corporation
