= Udenna Corporation =

Filipino holding company

- Type: Privately-held Holding company
- Industry: Various
- Founded: March 19, 2002; 24 years ago
- Founder: Dennis Uy
- Headquarters: Davao City, Philippines
- Key people: Dennis Uy (Chairman and CEO); Raymundo Martin "Marty" M. Escalona (President); Cherylyn C. Uy (Treasurer)
- Subsidiaries: Atok Big Wedge (20%); Chelsea Logistics (70%); Dito CME Holdings; Eight-8-Ate Holdings; Enderun Colleges; PH Resorts Group; Phoenix Petroleum (51.4%); Udenna Infrastructure
- Website: www.udenna.ph

The Udenna Corporation is a Philippines-based holding company involved in petrochemicals, logistics, property development, education, food, gaming, tourism, infrastructure and telecommunications.

== History ==
The Udenna Corporation was founded in 2002 by Davao City businessman Dennis Uy after quitting his family businesses. "Udenna" was derived from Uy's full name, Uy Dennis Ang. Phoenix Petroleum (initially Davao Oil Terminal and Services Corporation) was Udenna's first unit, and managed oil terminals in the early 2000s. It was renamed Phoenix Petroleum in 2005, going on to retail petroleum products. Phoenix Petroleum went public in 2007.

To supplement Udenna's petroleum business, Chelsea Shipping Corporation was established in 2006. Within the first year of President Rodrigo Duterte's administration, Udenna began acquiring companies. Udenna secured permission to develop a casino resort near Mactan–Cebu International Airport, entered the LPG industry, and acquired Enderun Colleges.

In November 2017, Udenna took over development of the former Global Gateway Logistics City at the Clark Freeport Zone in Pampanga, later relaunched as Clark Global City.

Mislatel (now Dito Telecommunity), a consortium by Udenna and China Telecom, won bidding to become the third primary telecommunications provider in the Philippines, joining PLDT and Globe Telecom.

In late 2018, Udenna began acquiring ISM Communications Corporation to get Udenna a backdoor listing on the stock exchange. Upon completion of the process, Udenna Corporation was to become a wholly owned subsidiary of ISM (renamed to Udenna Holdings Corporation) , with Dennis Uy and his wife owning ISM's shares. However, the planned backdoor listing was aborted and in March 2020, ISM was renamed to Dito CME Holdings Corporation.

In November 2020, Dito CME Holdings Corporation announced a share swap deal with Udenna to indirectly own its stake in Dito Telecommunity. As part of a deal, Dito CME will hold a 100% stake in Udenna's subsidiary, Udenna CME Holdings Corporation, which co-owns one of Dito's parent companies, Dito Holdings Corporation (along with Chelsea Logistics). The deal made Udenna Corporation become a parent company of Dito CME.

Udenna Corporation bought 100 million common shares of Atok-Big Wedge Co. Inc. at a negotiated price of P200,000,000. Dennis Uy is also vice chairman of Atok-Big Wedge, with 1,000 direct shares in the company. Atok-Big Wedge, a listed corporation in PSE, has 20% ownership of United Kingdom-based Forum Energy Ltd. which has oil exploration rights in SC72 in the South China Sea. Forum Energy has ongoing talks with China for joint oil exploration after President Duterte, a close friend of Dennis Uy, lift the moratorium on oil exploration.

== Subsidiaries ==
Oil, gas, and retail

- Phoenix Petroleum Philippines Inc.
  - Phoenix LPG Philippines Inc.
  - PNX Petroleum Singapore Pte Ltd.
  - Phoenix Gas Vietnam LLC
  - Phoenix Asphalt Philippines, Inc.
- Philippine FamilyMart CVS, Inc. (PFM) - Philippine franchise of the Japan-based convenience store chain. Acquired FamilyMart Philippines from the co-ownership of Ayala Corporation, Rustan's Group, and Itochu in 2018.

Logistics

- Chelsea Logistics & Infrastructure Holdings Corp., a holdings company, responsible for Udenna's shipping and logistics business.

Real estate

- Clark City Global Corporation - which holds the majority of Global Gateway Development Corporation, the leaseholder of the development in the Clark Freeport Zone.

Education

- Enderun Colleges

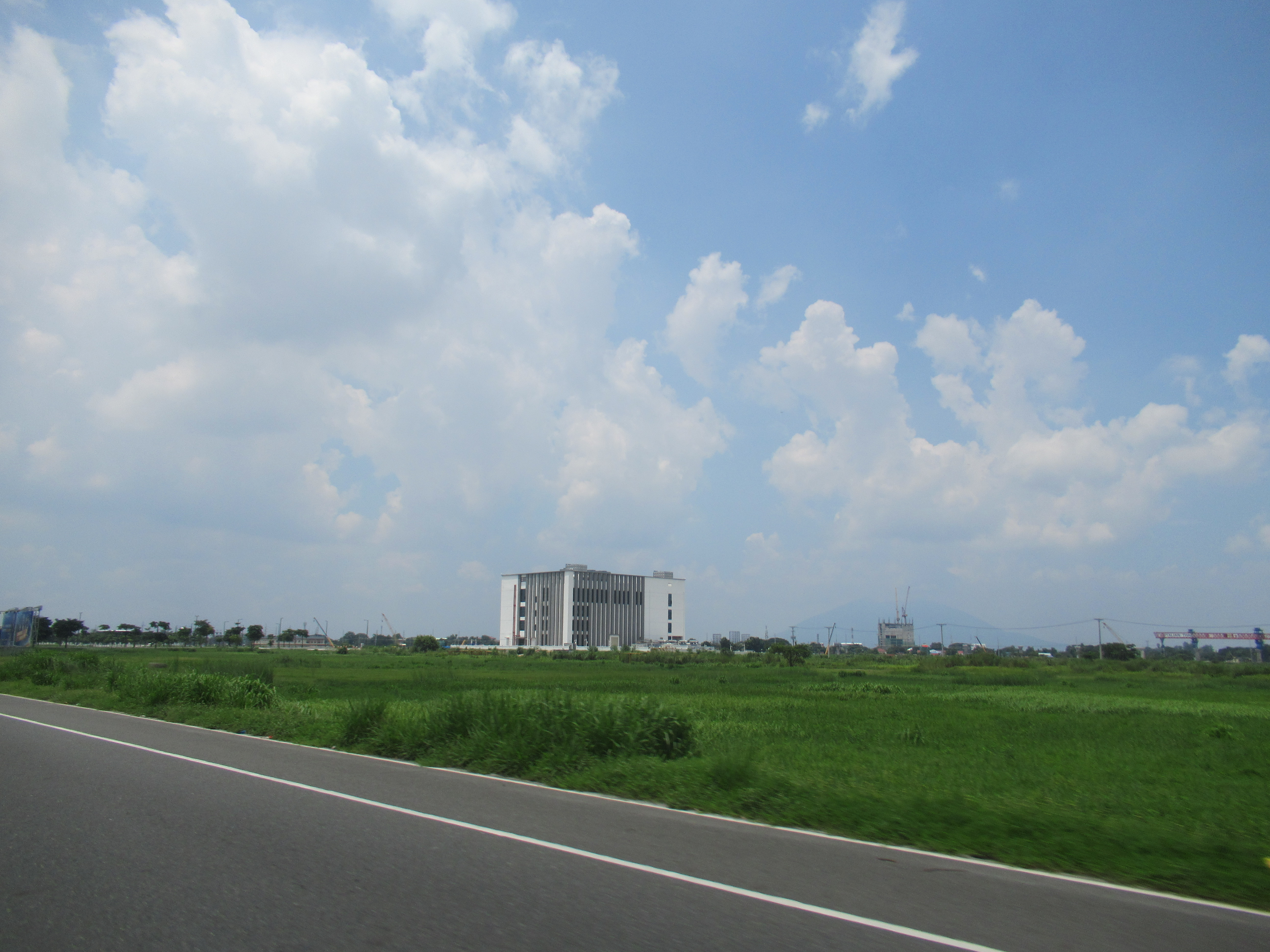
Clark Global City

Telecommunications

- Dito CME Holdings Corporation - formerly ISM Communications Corporation.
- Dito Holdings Corporation - a joint-venture with a 60% stake in Dito Telecommunity (co-owned by Dito CME through Udenna CME and Chelsea Logistics). Chinese state-owned China Telecommunications Corporation owns the remaining 40%.

Hospitality

- PH Resort Group
  - Donatela Hotel - Resort in Panglao, Bohol.
  - Emerald Bay Resort and Casino - Located in Mactan, Cebu.
  - Emerald Bay Resort and Casino
  - The Base - Located in Clark Global City, Pampanga.

Retail and food

- Eight-8-Ate Holdings, Inc.
  - Wendy's Philippines - Philippine franchise of the American burger fast-food chain.
- Conti's - bakeshop and restaurant chain. Udenna acquired a 70% stake in Conti's Holdings Corporation in 2018.
- L3 Concrete

== Controversies ==
The acquiring of the Malampaya stake to Udenna has been under scrutiny by some senators and concerned citizens.

== See also ==
- Dito CME Holdings Corporation
- Malampaya gas field
