= Clark Global City =

Planned development in the Philippines

- Central Business District
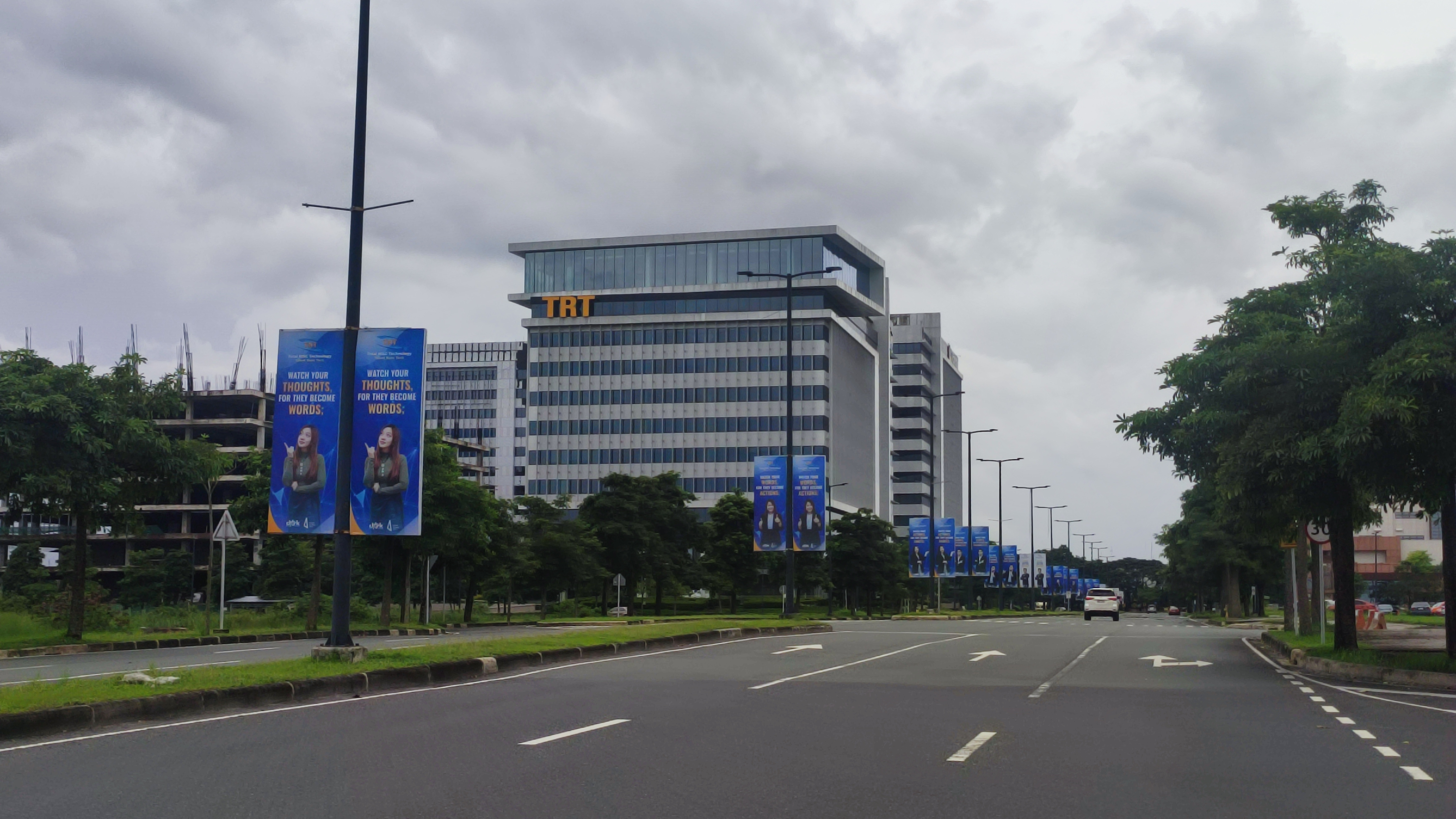
- The CBD as seen from Gatwick Gateway

- Interactive map of Clark Global City
- Coordinates: 15°10′42.2″N 120°34′34.5″E
- Country: Philippines
- Region: Central Luzon
- Province: Pampanga
- Cities: Mabalacat; Angeles City
- Established: -

Area
  - Total: 1.17 km^{2} (0.45 sq mi)
- Time zone: UTC+8 (PST)
- Catholic diocese: San Fernando
- Website: www.clarkglobalcity.com

Clark Global City (formerly the Global Gateway Logistics City) is a planned mixed-use central business district development at the Clark Freeport Zone in Mabalacat and Angeles City, Philippines. It is being built in the environs of Clark Air Base which was formerly the United States' largest overseas Air Base, before it was surrendered to the Philippine government.

Udenna Corporation is responsible for the development of Clark Global City since 2017. The development was initially meant as a product of Kuwaiti investment and was known as the Global Gateway Logistics City. The groundbreaking of the development took place in 2008.

== History ==
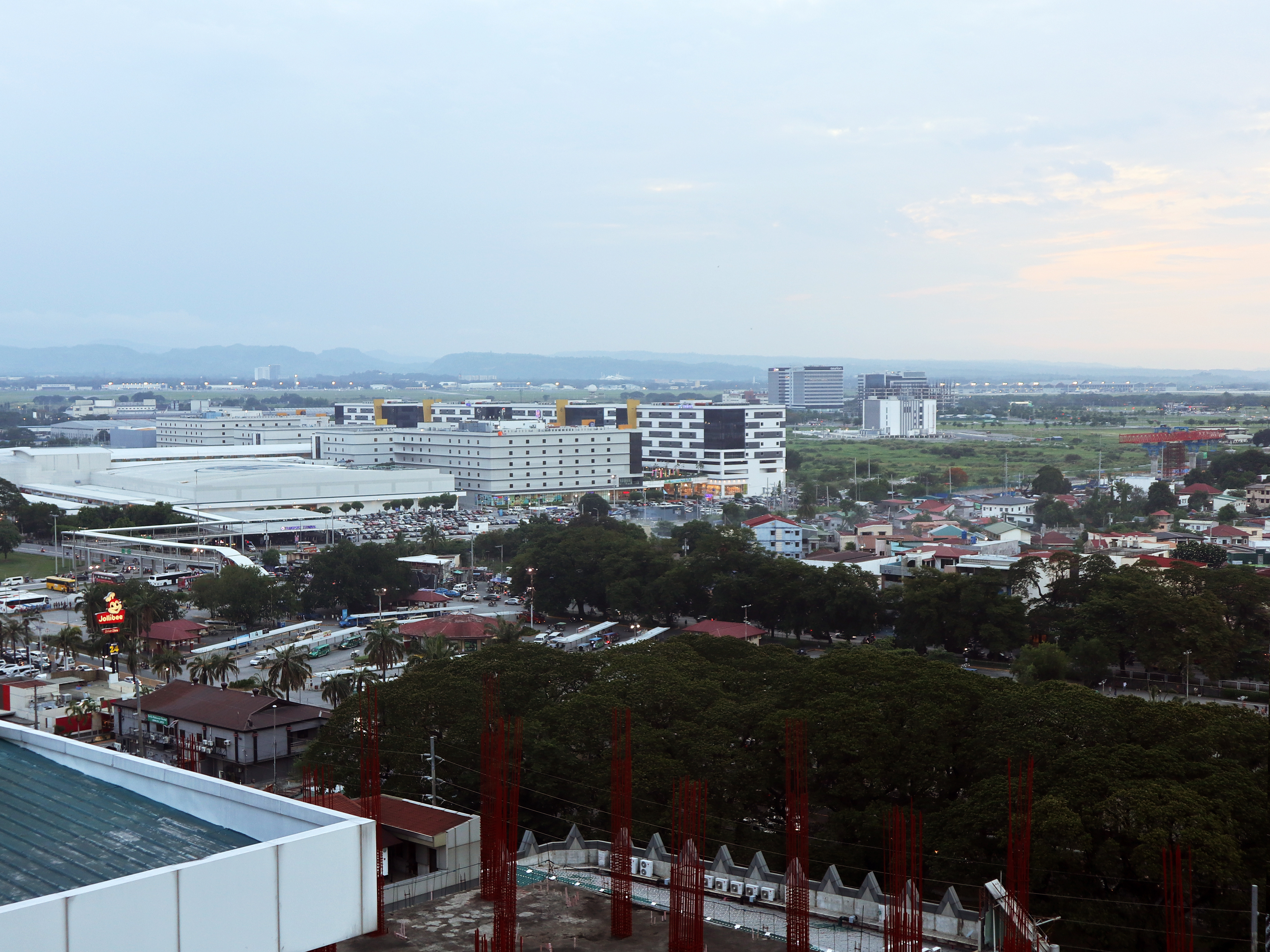
SM City Clark and office buildings

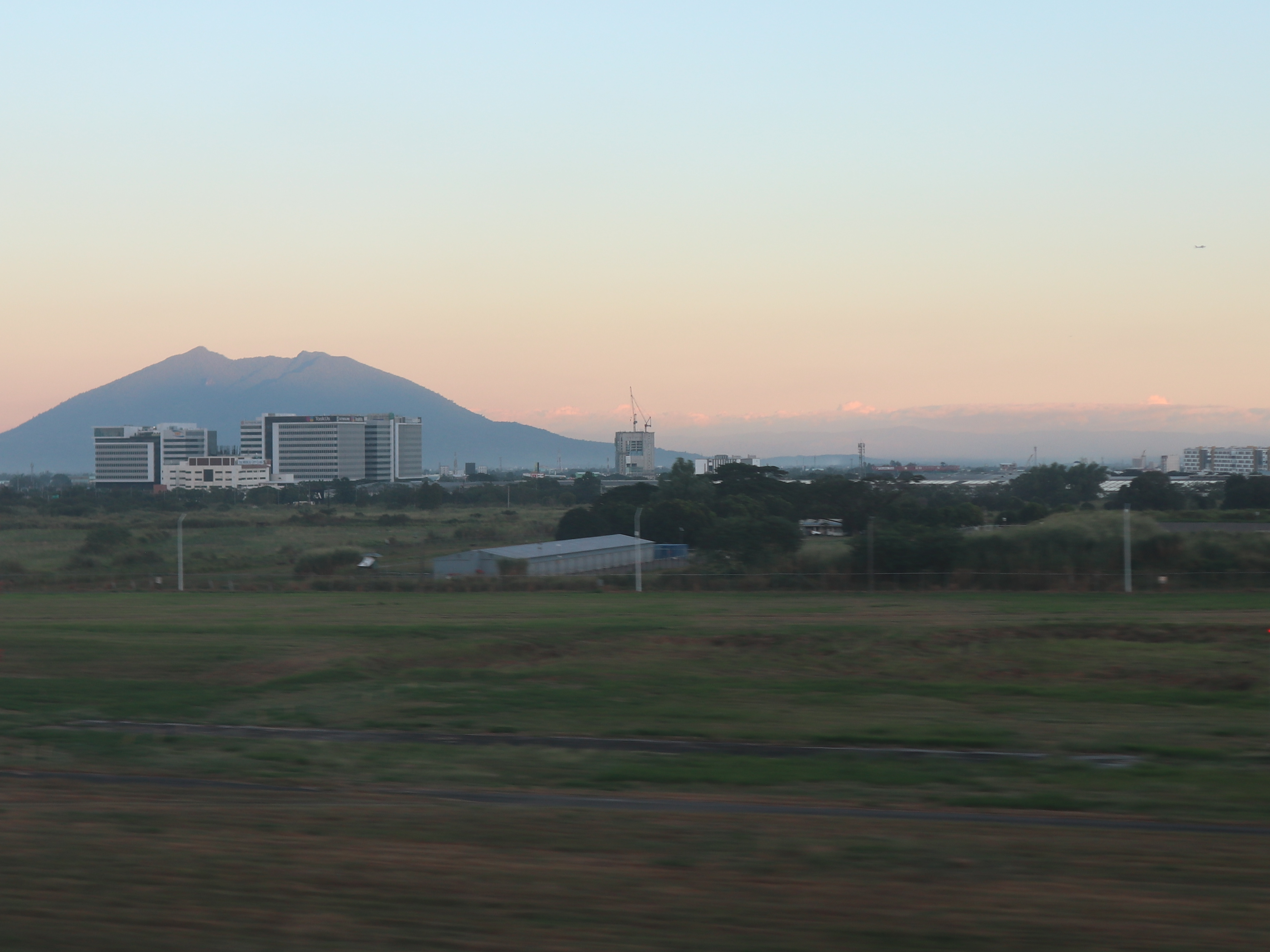
View of Mount Arayat

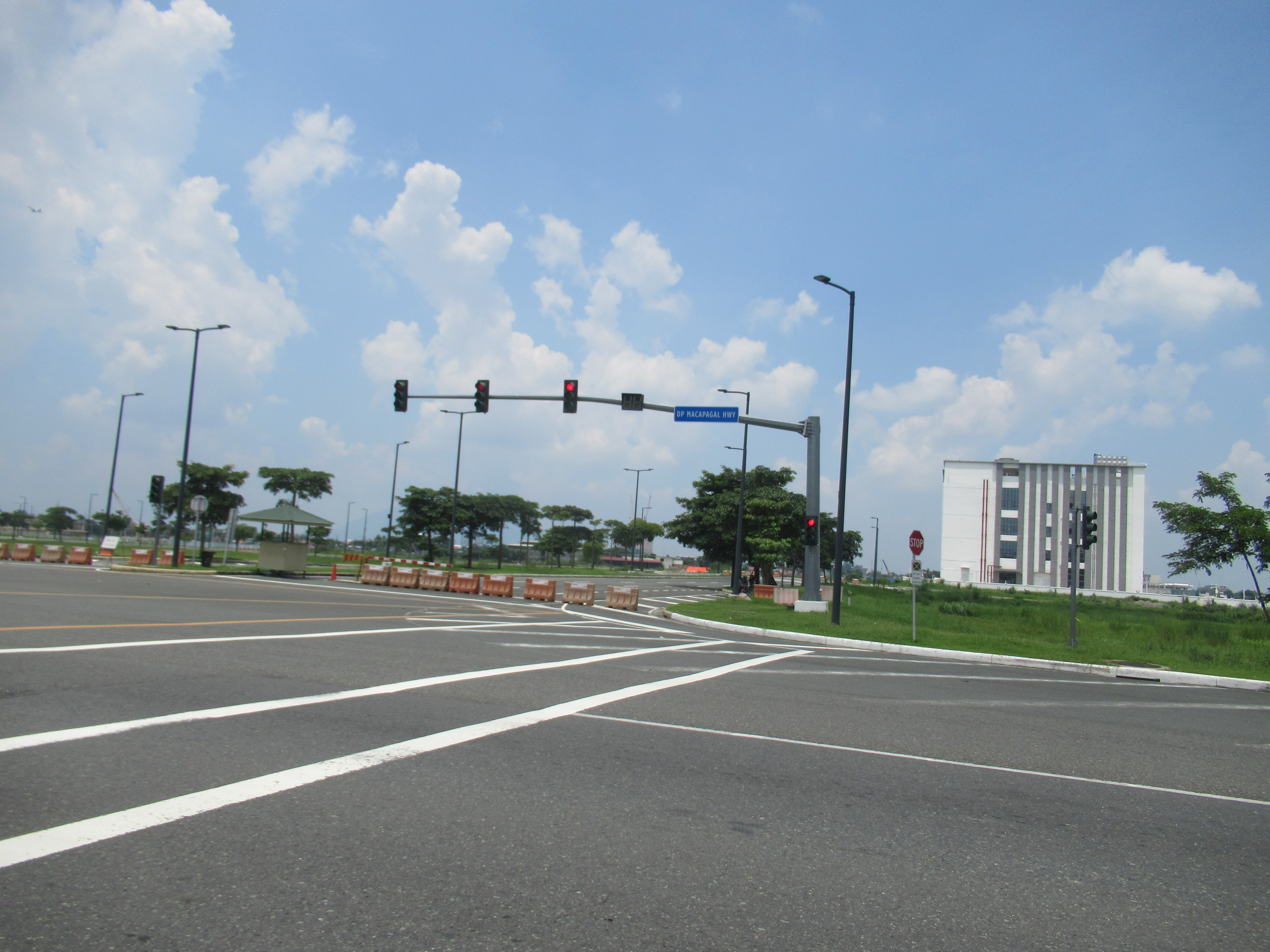
Diosdado Macapagal Highway

=== As Global Gateway Logistics City ===
Clark Global City was initially known as the Global Gateway Logistics City (GGLC). It was conceptualized by American firm Peregrine Development International Inc. (PDII) to the Kuwaiti investment firm KGL Investment Co. (KGLI Co.) in 2006. KGLI accepted PDII's proposal and signed a memorandum of agreement with the Clark International Airport Corporation regarding the project in April 2008. The groundbreaking ceremony was attended by President Gloria Macapagal Arroyo in August of the same year. KGLI was owner and developer of the GGLC through Global Gateway Development Corp (GGDC).

The GGLC was later renamed as the Sabah Al-Ahmad Global Gateway Logistics City in March 2012 honor of Sheikh Sabah Al-Ahmad Al-Jaber Al-Sabah, the Emir of Kuwait who had a state visit to the Philippines within that same month.

GGDC assumed operational control over the project's development in 2014 following a legal dispute with PDII over alleged breaches by the latter over the engineering, procurement and management (EPCM) agreement the two companies entered.

=== As Clark Global City ===
The land to be occupied by the Clark Global City was acquired from the Global Gateway Development Corporation, the former developer of the area by the Udenna Corporation in 2017. The transaction was made through loans from the Bank of China, BDO Unibank and the Philippine National Bank. Udenna effectively acquired the project by through buying out the stakes of GGDC Holdings, the majority shareholder of GGDC, by its subsidiary Clark City Global Corporation. The move was approved by the Philippine Competition Commission on October 18, 2017 and the acquisition was completed by November 14 of the same year. Udenna's property arm, Udenna Development Corporation has been tasked to oversee the development of the project.

Clark Global City was officially launched the following year on May 29 by the Udenna Corporation. By this time 47 hectares (120 acres) of the 177 hectares (440 acres) of the Clark Global City has been developed. It is planned that the whole business development to be completed in ten years.

== Geography ==
Clark Global City covers an area of 177 hectares (440 acres) and situated within the Clark Freeport Zone in Angeles City and Mabalacat, Pampanga.

== See also ==
- Clark Freeport and Special Economic Zone
  - New Clark City
  - Clark International Airport
