= Certificate of public convenience and necessity =

Regulatory compliance certification for public service industries

A certificate of public convenience and necessity or certificate of public convenience is a type of regulatory compliance certification for public service industries. Private companies wishing to provide essential public services in certain countries must be granted a CPCN before constructing facilities and offering services.

== Philippines ==
In the Philippines, a certificate of public convenience (CPC) is required for private provision of public services for which no franchise, either municipal or legislative, is required by law, such as a common carrier.

== United States ==
The first U.S. state statutes for certificate of public convenience (CPCN) were issued in 1870, and the U.S. Congress included a certification provision in U.S. federal law in the Transportation Act of 1920. Examples of industries requiring a CPCN from a U.S. state include the provision of telecommunications in New York state, transportation of natural gas in Alaska, and a range of public services in Illinois.
