= Presidency of Rodrigo Duterte =

Philippine presidential administration from 2016 to 2022

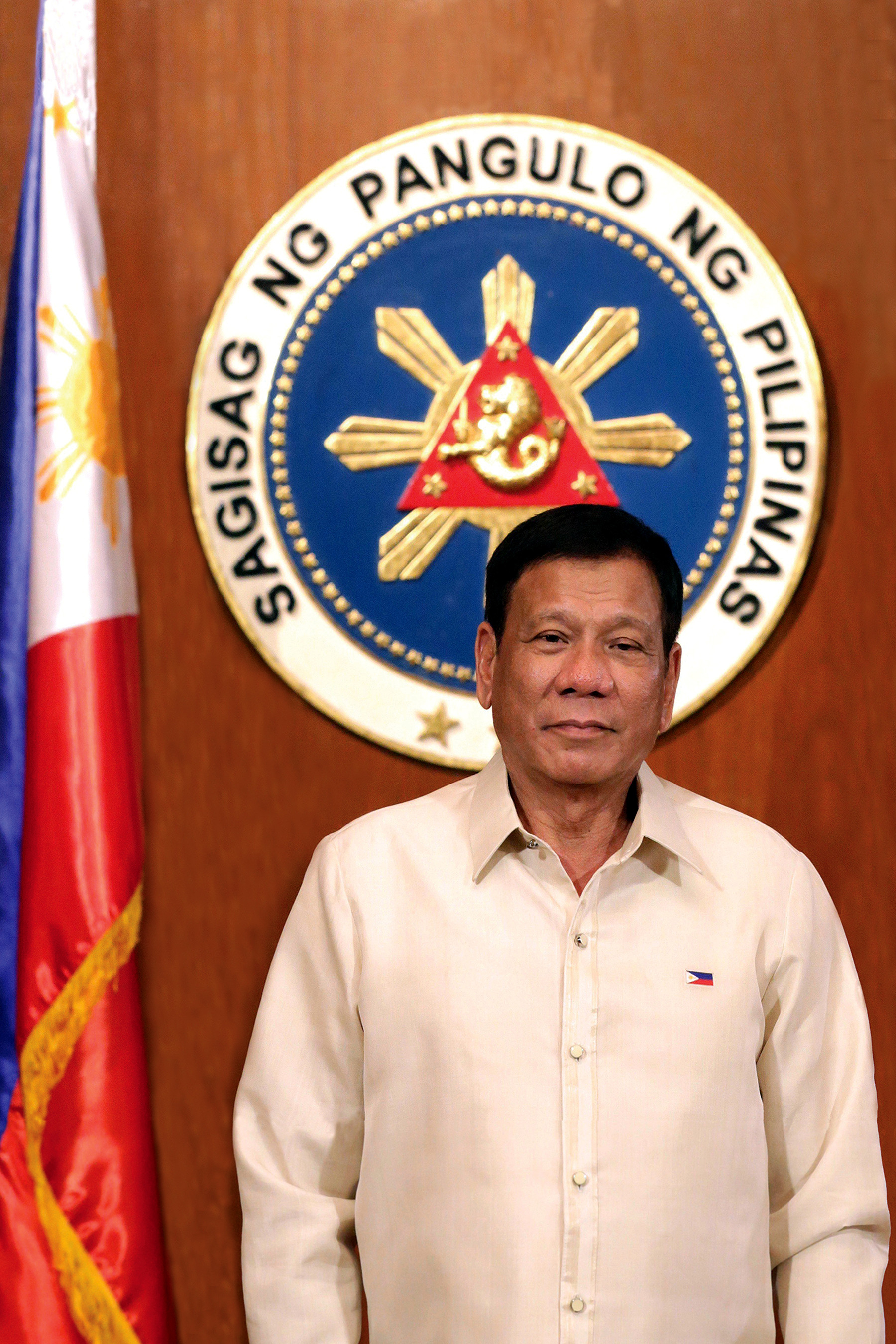
- Official portrait, 2016
- Presidency of Rodrigo Duterte; June 30, 2016 – June 30, 2022
- President: Rodrigo Roa Duterte
- Vice President: Leni Robredo
- Cabinet: See list
- Party: PDP–Laban
- Election: 2016
- Seat: Malacañang Palace, Manila
- Seal of the President

Rodrigo Duterte's six-year tenure as the 16th President of the Philippines began on the noon of June 30, 2016, succeeding Benigno Aquino III. He was the first president from Mindanao, the first president to have worked in all three branches of government, and the oldest to be elected. As mandated by the constitution, his tenure ended six years later on June 30, 2022, and was succeeded by Bongbong Marcos.

He won the election amid growing frustration with post-EDSA governance that favored elites over ordinary Filipinos. Duterte began a crackdown on illegal drugs and corruption, leading to a reduction in drug proliferation which caused the deaths of 6,600 people. His administration withdrew the Philippines from the International Criminal Court (ICC) after the court launched a preliminary examination into alleged crimes against humanity committed during the crackdown. On March 11, 2025, Duterte was arrested by the Philippine National Police and Interpol after a warrant was issued by the ICC for the alleged crimes during his presidency. The ICC unanimously confirmed all charges on April 23, 2026.

Duterte increased infrastructure spending and launched Build! Build! Build!, an ambitious infrastructure program. He initiated liberal economic reforms, including reforming the country's tax system. He also established freedom of information under the executive branch to eliminate corruption and red tape. Additionally, he granted free irrigation to small farmers and liberalized rice imports with the Rice Tariffication Law.

Duterte implemented a campaign against terrorism and signed the controversial Anti-Terrorism Act. He declared martial law in Mindanao during the Battle of Marawi and extended it for two years, the longest period of martial law in the Philippines since Ferdinand Marcos' 14-year rule. He pursued peace talks with the Communist Party of the Philippines (CPP) but cancelled them in February 2017 after attacks by the New People's Army (NPA) against government forces as justification and declared the CPP-NPA as a terrorist group. He created task forces to end local communist armed conflict and for the reintegration of former communist rebels, and enacted a law establishing the Bangsamoro Autonomous Region and granting amnesty to former rebels.

Duterte implemented free college education in state universities and colleges and institutionalized an alternative learning system. He also signed the automatic enrollment of all Filipinos in the government's health insurance program and ordered the full implementation of the Reproductive Health Law. In response to the COVID-19 pandemic, he initially implemented strict lockdown measures, causing a 9.5% contraction of the gross domestic product (GDP) in 2020. However, with the economy gradually reopening, the GDP increased by 5.6% in 2021.

Duterte sought improved relations with China and Russia and reduced dependence on the United States. He took a conciliatory stance toward China, setting aside the controversial Philippines v. China ruling on South China Sea claims.

Duterte is a polarizing figure, facing criticism and international opposition for his anti-narcotics efforts. Various poll agencies such as SWS, PUBLiCUS Asia, and Pulse Asia consider Duterte's approval ratings to have remained high during and after his presidency, according to their own polling, making Duterte as the most popular post-People Power Revolution president.

== Election, transition, and inauguration ==
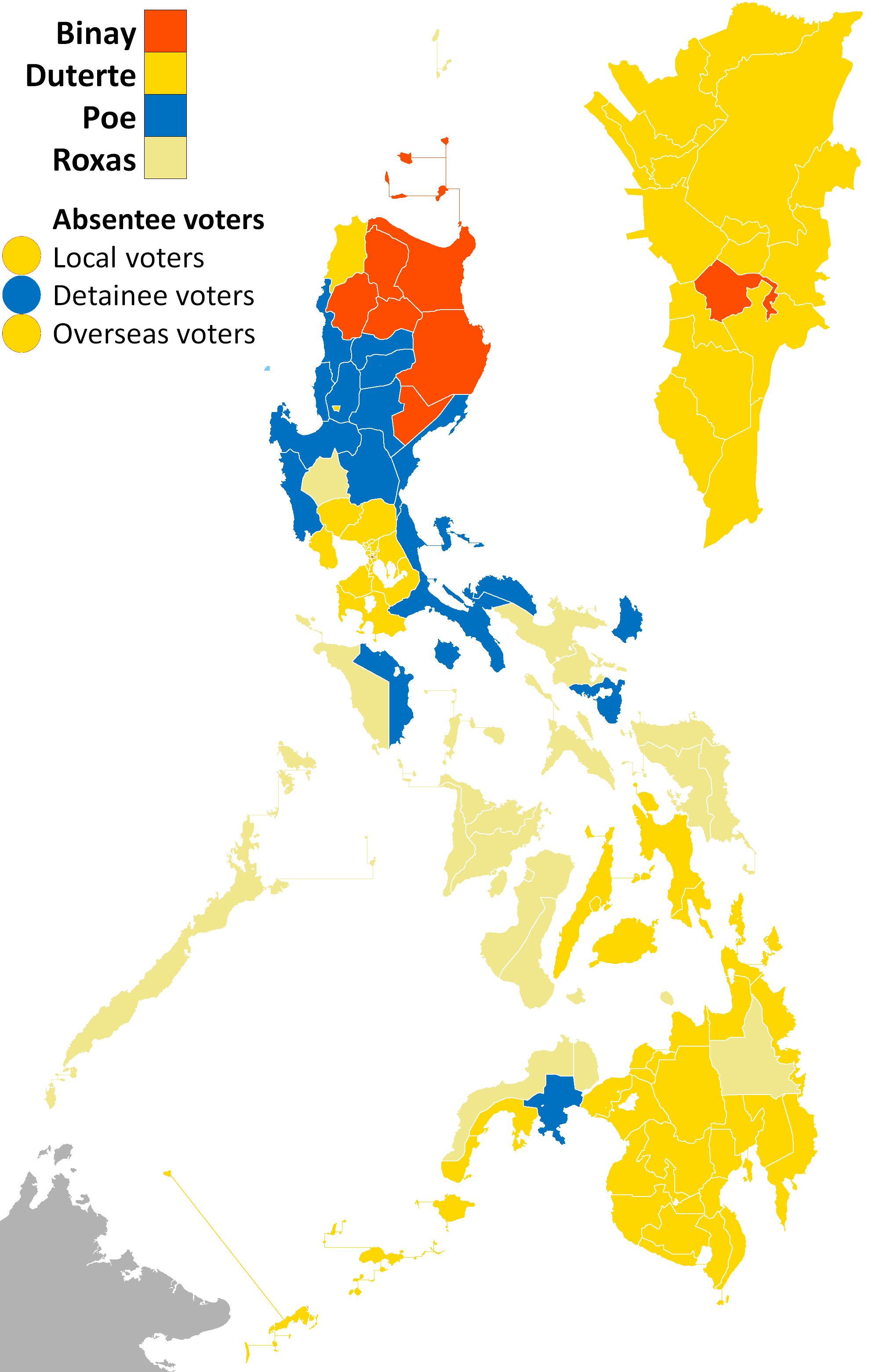
Duterte won solid votes from Mindanao, Metro Manila, and Cebu during the 2016 presidential election.

Duterte, campaigning on a platform of fighting crime, corruption, and illegal drugs, won the 2016 presidential election with 16,601,997 (39.02%) votes, defeating Liberal Party leader Mar Roxas by over 6.6 million votes.

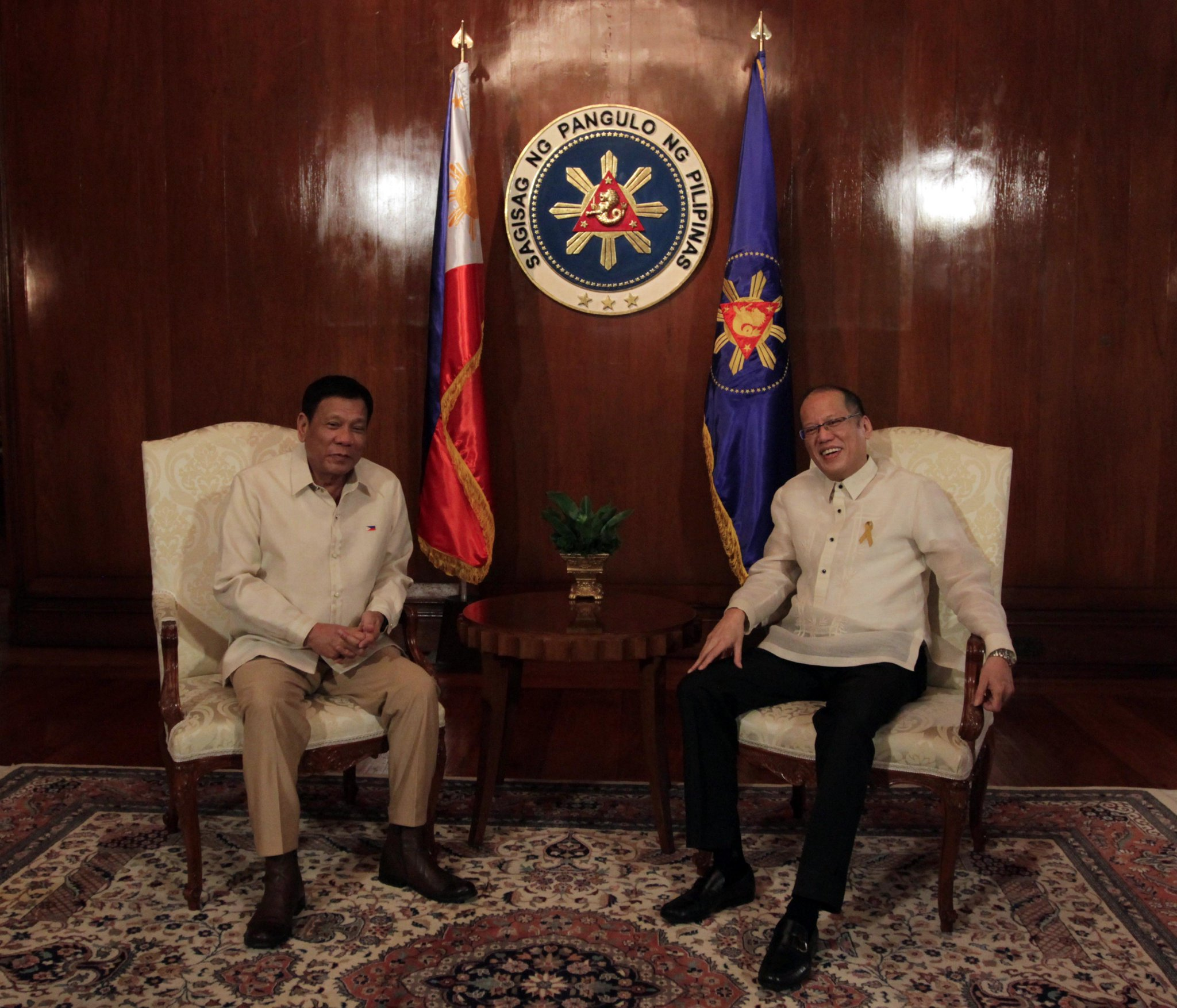
President-elect Rodrigo Duterte (left) and outgoing President Benigno Aquino III on June 30, 2016.

On May 9, 2016, the Congress of the Philippines declared Duterte the winner of the presidential election. Duterte's transition team was organized after he led by a significant margin at the unofficial count by the Commission on Elections (COMELEC) and the Parish Pastoral Council for Responsible Voting. The transition team prepared the new presidential residence and cabinet appointments, and held meetings with the outgoing administration.

Inauguration of Rodrigo Duterte (2:09)
Duterte is joined by his children as he takes his oath as the 16th President of the Philippines.

On June 30, 2016, Bienvenido L. Reyes, an Associate Justice of the Supreme Court of the Philippines and fraternity brother of Duterte, inaugurated Duterte as the sixteenth president of the Philippines in a simple ceremony held in the largest room of Malacañang Palace in Manila. This was the fourth inauguration to be held in Malacañang and the first since the establishment of the Fifth Philippine Republic.

== Administration and cabinet ==
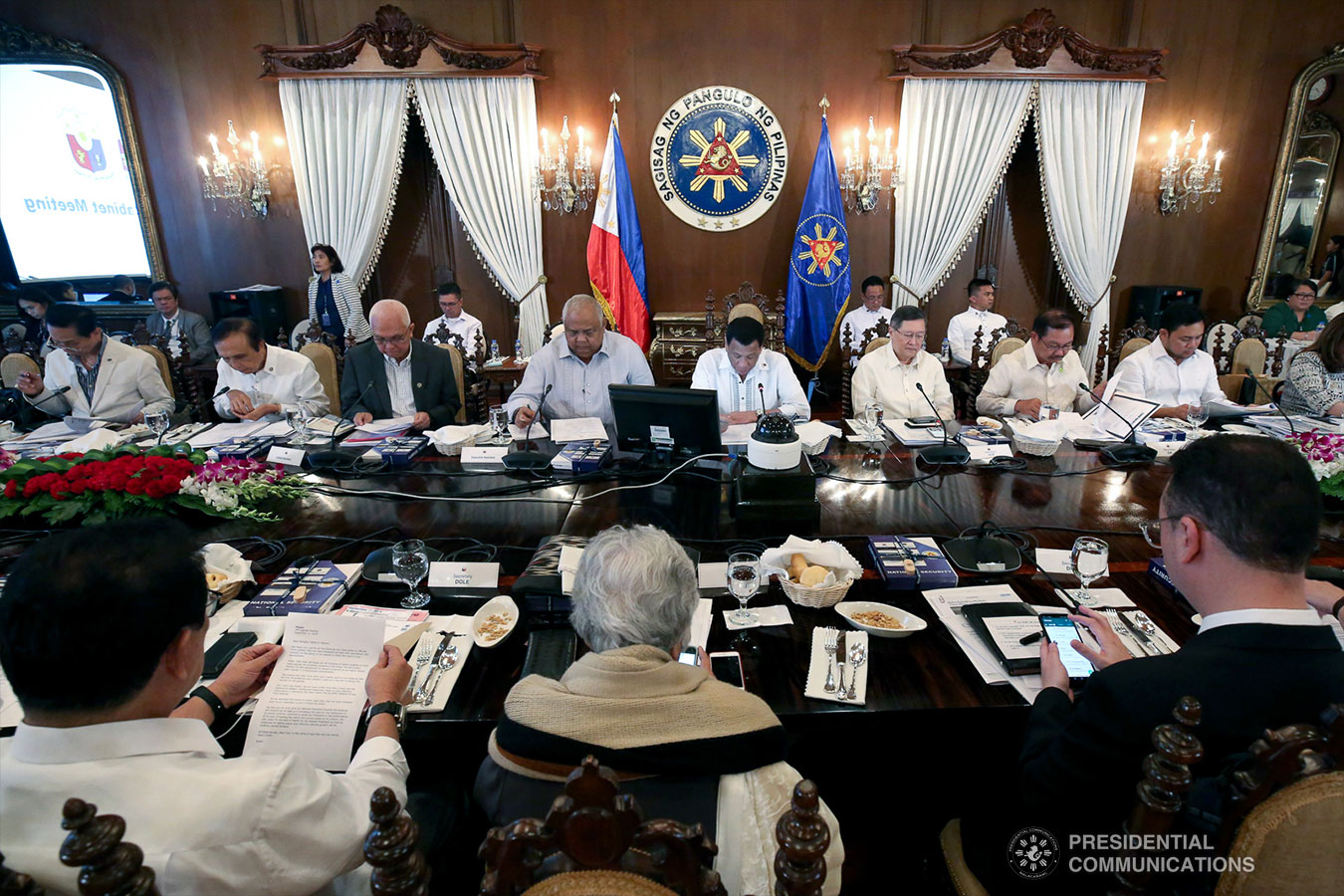
Duterte presides over the 29th Cabinet Meeting at the Malacañang Palace on September 11, 2018.

On May 31, 2016, a few weeks before his presidential inauguration, Duterte named his Cabinet, which consisted of former military generals, childhood friends, classmates, and leftist politicians. Following his presidential inauguration, he administered a mass oath-taking for his Cabinet officials, and held his first Cabinet meeting on June 30. He appointed his long-time personal aide Bong Go as Special Assistant to the President to provide general supervision to the Presidential Management Staff.

During his tenure, Duterte appointed several retired military generals and police directors to the Cabinet and other government agencies, stating they are honest and competent. He initially offered four executive departments to left-leaning individuals, who later resigned, were fired, or rejected by the Commission on Appointments after relations between the government and the communist rebels deteriorated. Duterte fired several Cabinet members and officials who were linked to corruption but critics accused him of "recycling" people he fired when he appointed some of them to other government positions. Stating he is not an economist, Duterte appointed several technocrats to his Cabinet, whom he relied upon for economic affairs.

== Judicial appointments ==
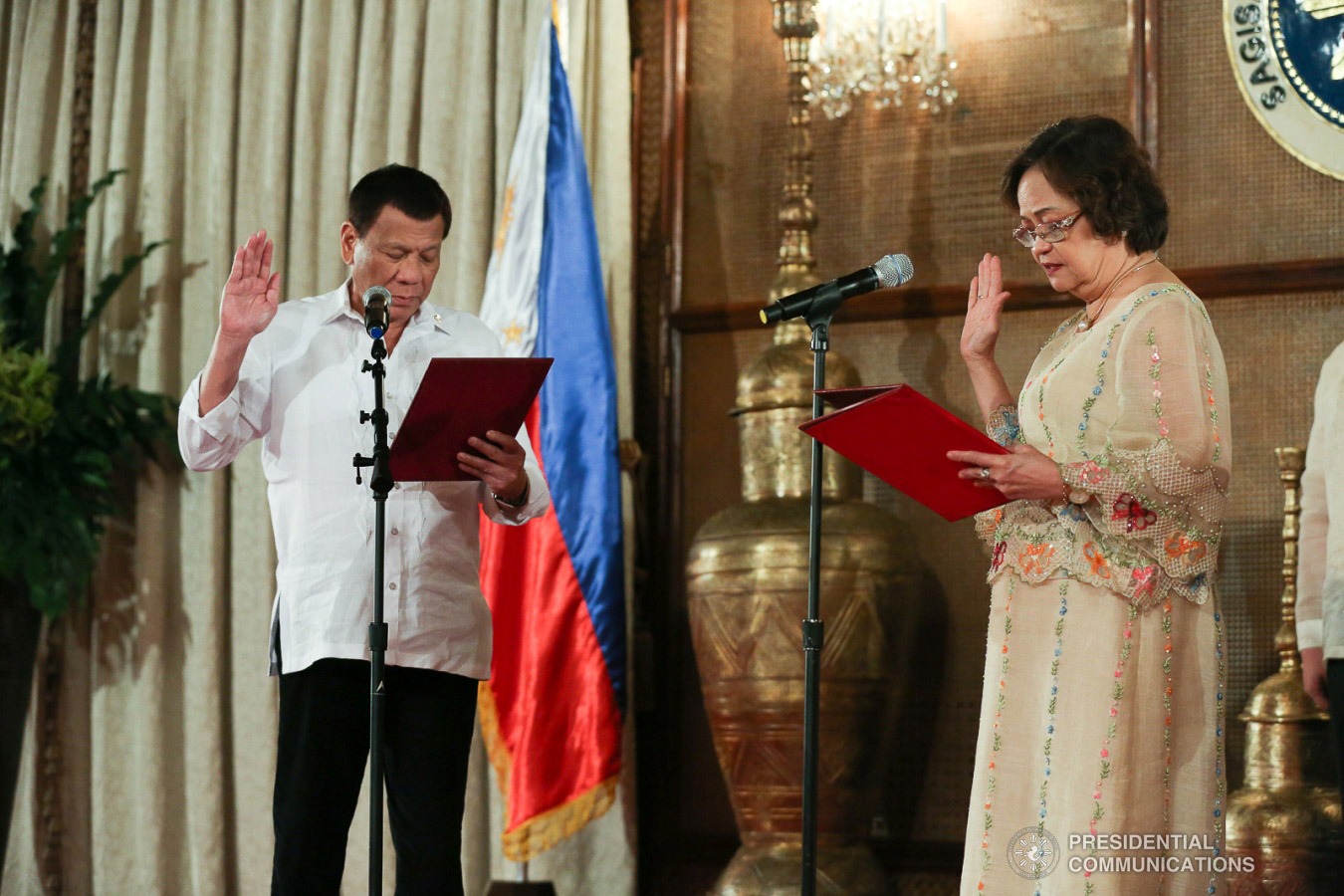
Duterte administers the oath of Chief Justice Teresita de Castro on August 31, 2018, to fill in the position of Maria Lourdes Sereno, whose appointment was declared null and void by the Supreme Court three months prior.

Duterte appointed the following to the Supreme Court of the Philippines:

=== Chief Justice ===
1. Teresita Leonardo-De Castro - August 28, 2018
2. Lucas Bersamin - November 28, 2018
3. Diosdado Peralta - October 23, 2019
4. Alexander Gesmundo - April 5, 2021 (as Chief Justice)

=== Associate Justices ===
1. Samuel Martires - March 6, 2017 (as Associate Justice), July 26, 2018 (as Ombudsman).
2. Noel G. Tijam - March 8, 2017
3. Andres Reyes Jr. - July 12, 2017
4. Alexander Gesmundo - August 14, 2017 (as Associate Justice)
5. Jose C. Reyes - August 10, 2018
6. Ramon Paul Hernando - October 10, 2018
7. Rosmari D. Carandang - November 28, 2018
8. Amy C. Lazaro-Javier - March 7, 2019
9. Henri Jean Paul Inting - May 27, 2019
10. Rodil V. Zalameda - August 5, 2019
11. Edgardo L. de Los Santos - December 3, 2019
12. Mario V. Lopez - December 3, 2019
13. Samuel H. Gaerlan - January 8, 2020
14. Priscilla Baltazar-Padilla - July 16, 2020
15. Ricardo Rosario - October 8, 2020
16. Jhosep Lopez - January 26, 2021
17. Japar Dimaampao - July 2, 2021
18. Midas Marquez - September 27, 2021
19. Antonio Kho Jr. - February 23, 2022
20. Maria Filomena Singh - May 18, 2022

== Major activities ==
=== Speeches ===
2016 State of the Nation Address (1:32:48)
Duterte delivers his first State of the Nation Address at the Batasang Pambansa with Senate President Aquilino Pimentel III (seated left) and House Speaker Pantaleon Alvarez on July 25, 2016.

- Inaugural Address (June 30, 2016)
- First State of the Nation Address (July 25, 2016)
- Second State of the Nation Address (July 24, 2017)
- Third State of the Nation Address (July 23, 2018)
- Fourth State of the Nation Address (July 22, 2019)
- Fifth State of the Nation Address (July 27, 2020)
- Sixth State of the Nation Address (July 26, 2021)

=== Major acts and legislation ===
Duterte signed into law 379 bills in the 17th Congress; 120 of these laws were national in scope while 259 were local. In the 18th Congress, Duterte signed into law 311 bills, of which 119 were national and 192 were local.

=== Executive issuances ===
The Official Gazette lists 176 executive orders, 1,401 proclamations, 53 memorandum orders, 98 memorandum circulars, 48 administrative orders, 20 special orders, and one general order issued by Duterte.

=== National budget ===
R. A. No.	Title	Principal Sponsor	Date signed
10924	General Appropriations Act of 2017	Loren Legarda	December 22, 2016
10964	General Appropriations Act of 2018	Loren Legarda	December 19, 2017
11260	General Appropriations Act of 2019	Loren Legarda	April 15, 2019
11464	Extension of General Appropriations Act of 2019	Nancy Binay	December 20, 2019
11465	General Appropriations Act of 2020	Nancy Binay	January 6, 2020
11520	General Appropriations Act of 2021	Nancy Binay	December 29, 2020
11640	General Appropriations Act of 2022	Nancy Binay	December 30, 2021

== Leadership style ==
Duterte is known for his authoritarian leadership style and man-of-the-people persona, characterized by fiery rhetoric and controversial, off-the-cuff speeches. His spokesperson and advisors frequently had to interpret and clarify his remarks. Some observers expressed concern that his statements may have been misconstrued as government policy. He was also criticized for his sexist jokes and low tolerance for dissent. Duterte believed an "iron fist" was needed to instill discipline and cultivated a public image of a father figure Tatay Digong (Father Digong), who instills order and discipline within the nation. Amid the COVID-19 pandemic, he imposed community quarantines and used the military and police to enforce social-distancing guidelines. Scholars coined the term Dutertismo to refer to Duterte's style of governance and the illiberal and radical elements of his presidency.

Duterte has been called a populist for his rejection of titles and casual attitude. He has issued an order prohibiting the use of honorifics for himself, his family, and his Cabinet members. He often chewed gum in public and wore casual attire for formal occasions, saying he dresses for comfort and not to impress anybody. His informal and unaffected attitude attracted support from many Filipinos. Duterte described himself as a night person, typically starting his working day at 13:00 or 14:00, and calling for news conferences that began at midnight.

== First 100 days ==
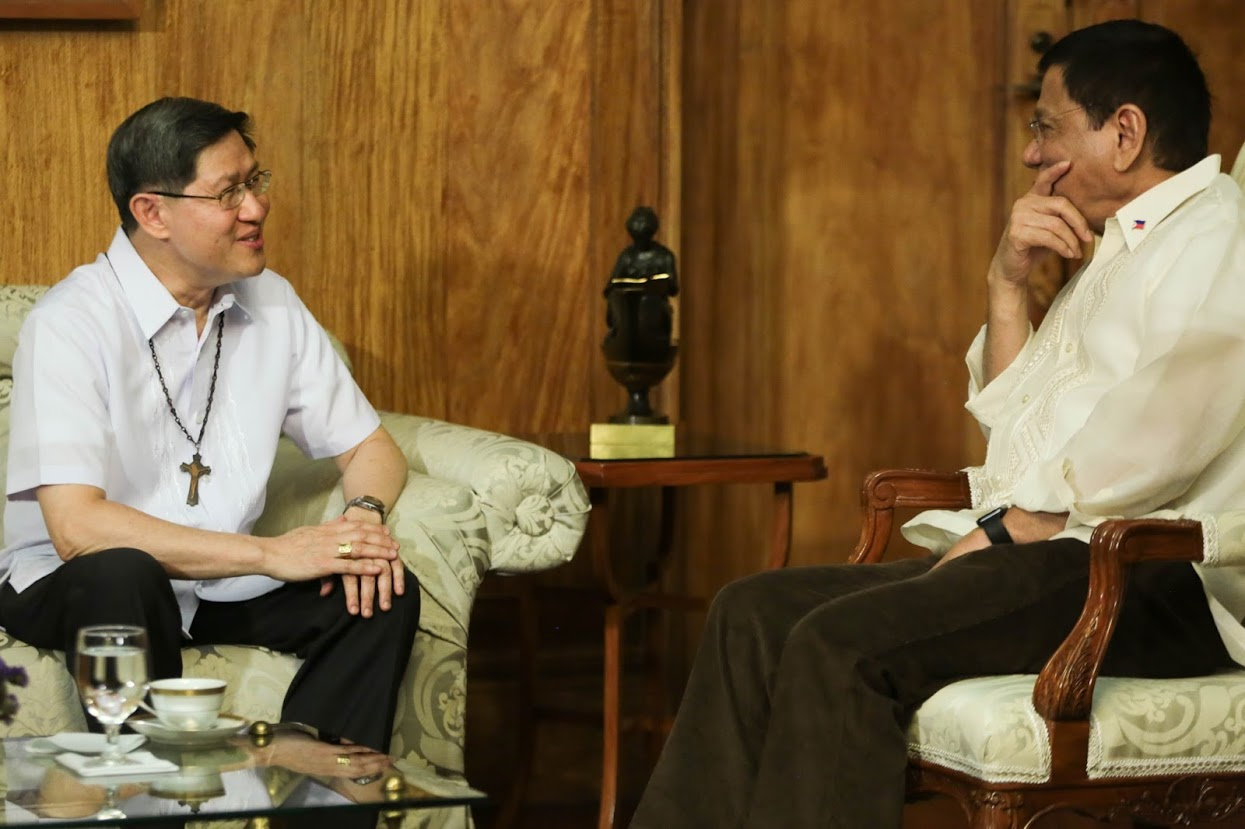
Duterte talks with Manila Archbishop Luis Antonio Cardinal Tagle during a courtesy call at Malacañang Palace, July 19, 2016

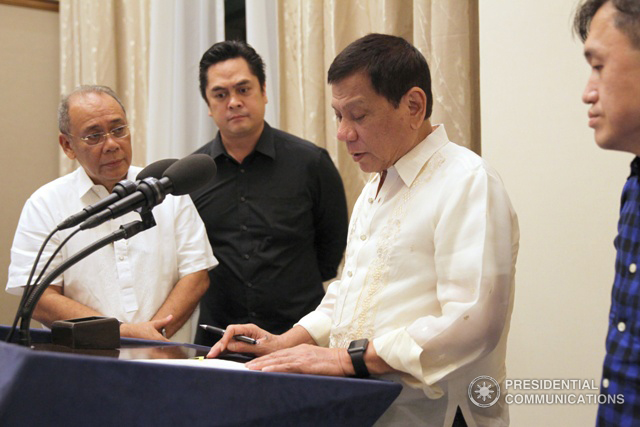
Duterte signs the Freedom of Information executive order in Davao City on July 24, 2016.

During his first 100 days in office, Duterte issued an executive order on freedom of information and sought to resume peace talks with communist insurgents. He also formulated a comprehensive tax-reform plan and led efforts to pass the Bangsamoro Basic Law. Additionally, he sought to streamline government transactions and launched the nationwide 9–1–1 rescue and 8888 complaint hotlines. He also established a one-stop service center for overseas Filipino workers and increased the combat and incentive pay of soldiers and police personnel. Internationally, he took actions to limit the number of visiting US troops in the country and had contact with China and Russia to improve diplomatic relations.

Duterte launched a campaign against illegal drugs resulting in the arrest of 22,000 suspects, surrender of 731,000 people, and deaths of 3,300, half killed by unknown assailants. He criticized the Catholic Church and the international critics, including US President Barack Obama, the US government, the United Nations, and the European Union, who condemned his tactics.

After the September 2 bombing in Davao City killed 14 people, Duterte issued Proclamation No. 55, officially declaring a "state of national emergency on account of lawless violence in Mindanao".

== Domestic affairs ==
=== Insurgency and terrorism ===
==== Islamic insurgency in Mindanao ====
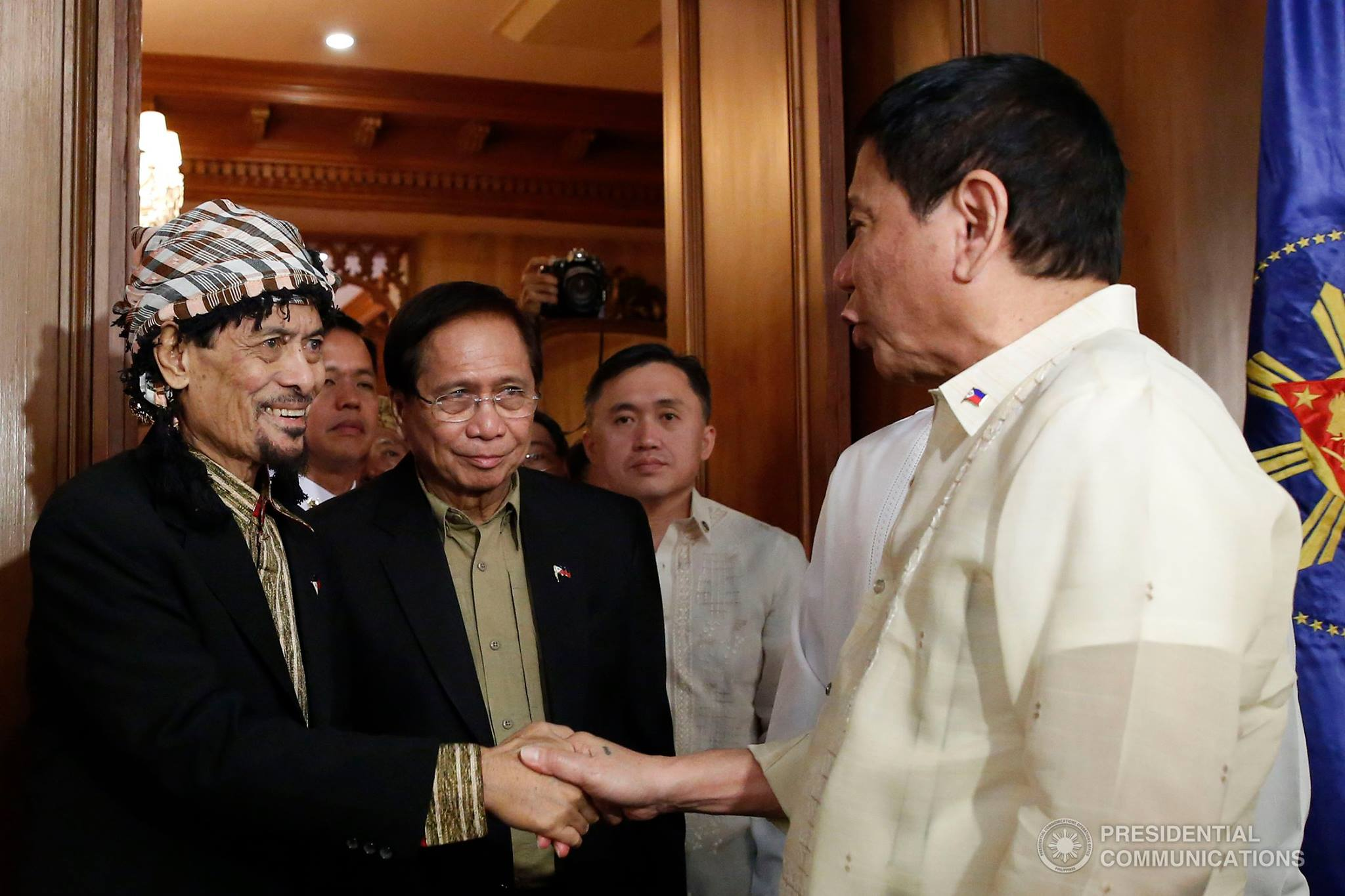
Duterte meets with MNLF chairman, founder and former ARMM Governor Nur Misuari, November 3, 2016

Duterte, from Mindanao, gained Muslim support in the 2016 election. He argued that the Moro National Liberation Front (MNLF) and Moro Islamic Liberation Front (MILF) were not terrorists but Moro coalitions fighting for dignity. He blamed colonial Christianity and the United States for the Moro conflict in Mindanao.

In 2016, Duterte signed an executive order expanding the Bangsamoro Transition Commission from 15 members to 21, with 11 chosen by the MILF and 10 nominated by the government. This commission is responsible for drafting the Bangsamoro Basic Law, which is seen as a key part of the federalism plan for resolving the Bangsamoro peace process.

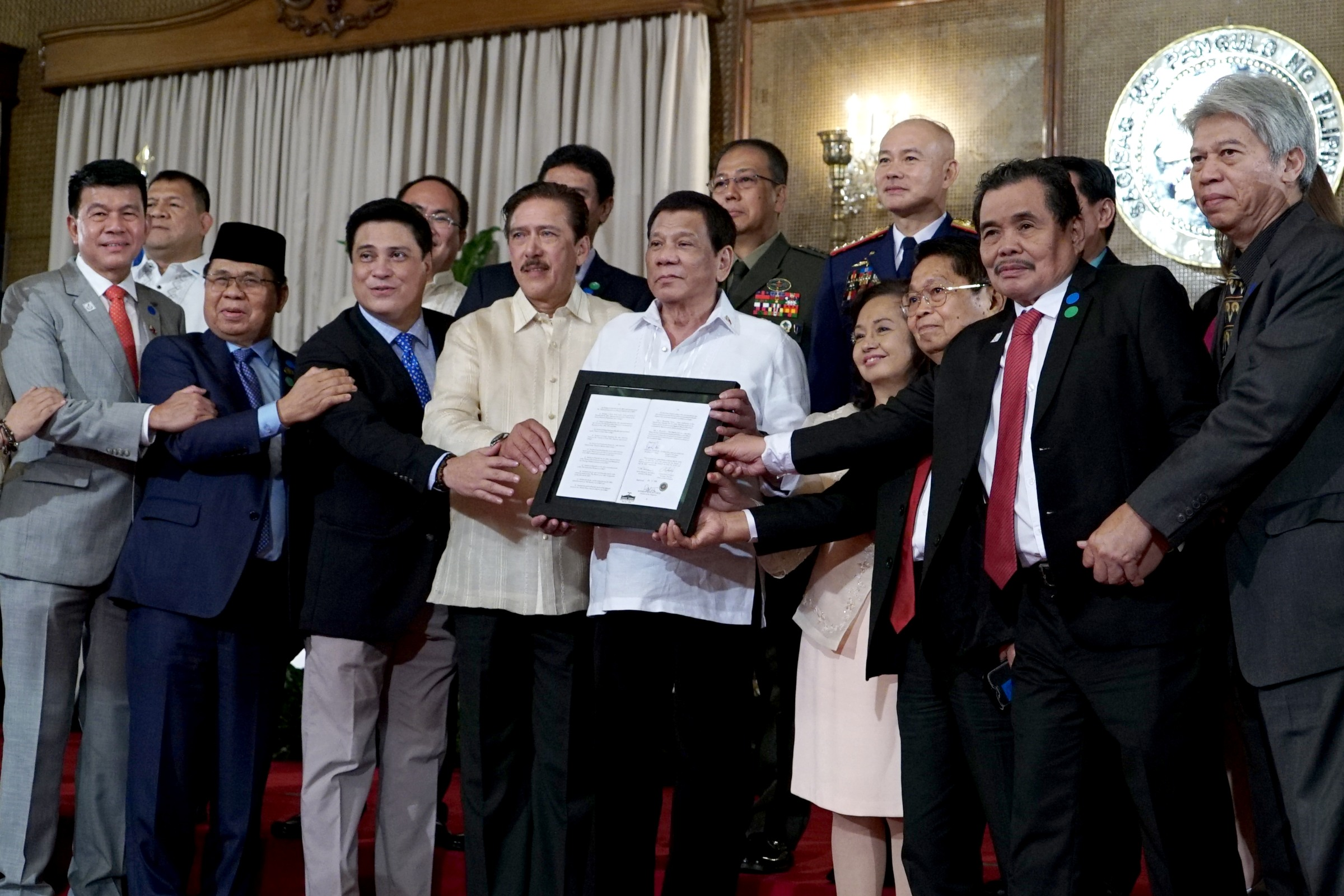
Duterte (center) with other officials during the presentation of the Bangsamoro Organic Law to the MILF at Malacañang Palace on August 6, 2018

Following the Comprehensive Agreement on the Bangsamoro signed between the Government of the Philippines and the MILF in 2014, on July 26, 2018, Duterte signed the Bangsamoro Organic Law, which abolished the Autonomous Region in Muslim Mindanao (ARMM) and provided the basic structure of government for the Bangsamoro Autonomous Region in Muslim Mindanao (BARMM). Duterte signed an executive order in April 2019 facilitating the decommissioning of MILF forces and weapons; from June 2019 to May 2022, around 19,200 former MILF combatants and 2,100 weapons were decommissioned. At the urging of the Bangsamoro Transition Authority, Duterte signed a law postponing the first parliamentary elections of BARMM from 2022 to 2025.

==== Campaign against terrorism ====
Declaration of liberation of Marawi
Rodrigo Duterte declares Marawi liberated from terrorist influence on October 17, 2017.

On May 23, 2017, clashes between Philippine security forces and the ISIS-affiliated Maute and Abu Sayyaf (ASG) Salafi jihadist groups occurred in Marawi, prompting Duterte to declare martial law across Mindanao. The city was extensively damaged by militant fire and military airstrikes, necessitating rehabilitation, and Marawi was declared liberated from terrorist influence on October 17. Congress granted Duterte's requests to extend martial law in Mindanao thrice between 2017 and 2019. Martial law lapsed on January 1, 2020, after Duterte decided not to extend it.

In July 2020, Duterte signed the Anti-Terrorism Act of 2020; critics argued the law relaxes safeguards on human rights and is prone to abuse, while authors and sponsors of the bill compared it to laws of other countries and maintained it would not be used against law-abiding citizens. From 2016 to 2021, 1,544 ASG members, 971 Bangsamoro Islamic Freedom Fighters members, and 1,427 Dawlah Islamiyah members were captured, killed, or surrendered.

==== Campaign against communist insurgency ====
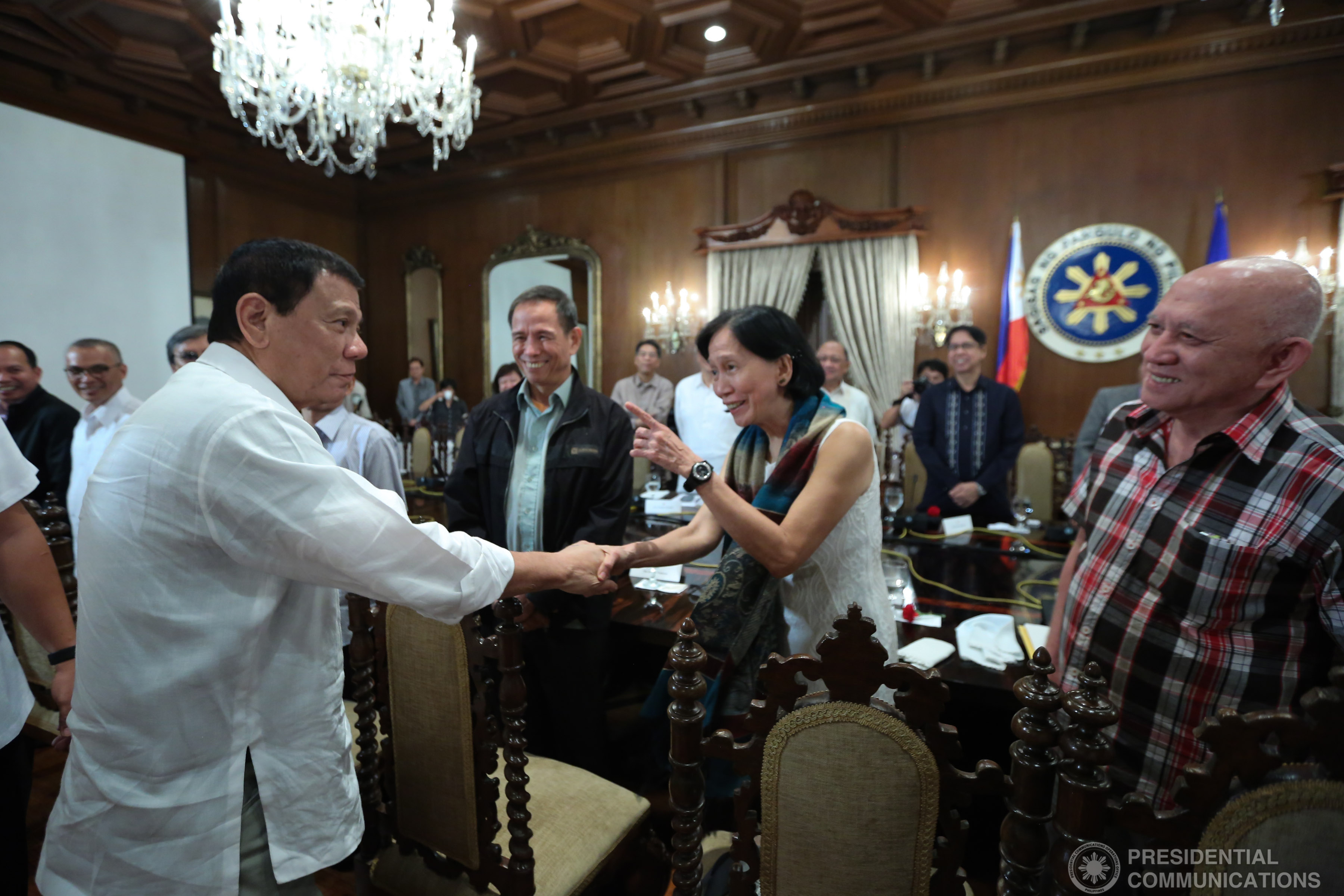
Duterte meets with CPP-NPA secretary-general Wilma and CPP-NPA chairman Benito Tiamzon (foreground, center) on September 26, 2016.

Duterte sought peace with communist rebels, directing his advisor Silvestre Bello III to lead talks with the Communist Party of the Philippines (CPP), the New People's Army (NPA), and the National Democratic Front (NDF) in Oslo. The administration hoped for a peace treaty within a year and temporarily released communist prisoners, including CPP-NPA chairman Benito Tiamzon and CPP-NPA secretary-general Wilma Tiamzon, for the talks.

The Commission on Appointments rejected several officials appointed by Duterte with leftist affiliations, and relations between Duterte and the communist rebels deteriorated. Duterte rejected communist rebel proposals for a "coalition government". After the NPA allegedly killed soldiers in an encounter during a ceasefire, Duterte canceled negotiations with the CPP-NPA-NDF and designated them as a terrorist organization and ordered the arrest of all NDF negotiators. Clashes between the military and the rebels resumed after the ceasefire was lifted.

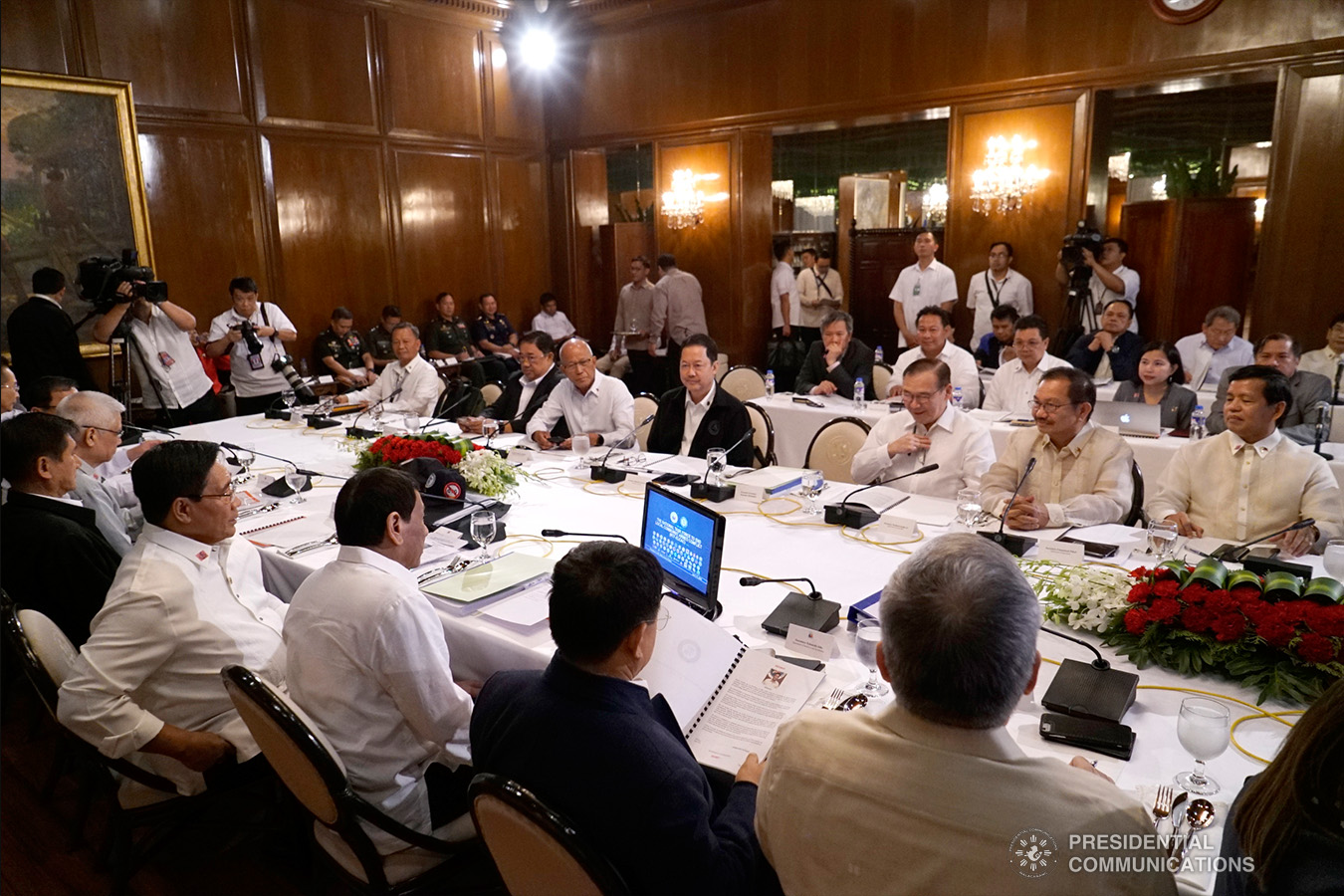
Duterte (foreground, 3rd from right) presides over a meeting with the NTF-ELCAC at the Malacañan Palace on April 15, 2019

Duterte formed a task force to centralize government efforts for the reintegration of former rebels and issued an executive order in December 2018 creating the National Task Force to End Local Communist Armed Conflict (NTF-ELCAC) to implement a "Whole-of-nation approach" in addressing the "root causes" of communism. In March 2019, he permanently terminated peace negotiations with the CPP-NPA-NDF, facilitating localized peace talks.

In July 2017, Duterte threatened to bomb Lumad schools, alleging they shelter rebels and teach against the government. In August 2017, the DepEd said that the schools undergo regular performance monitoring and that the DepEd had not received reports of Lumad schools teaching subversion or communism. Duterte supported the military's claim that the left-wing party-lists of the Makabayan Bloc are fronts for the CPP, drawing criticism for red-tagging, which he denied.

By the end of Duterte's term in office, the number of NPA guerrilla fronts was reduced from 89 to 23; of more than 25,000 "members, supporters, and sympathizers of the underground movement", only 2,000 remained according to the Armed Forces of the Philippines (AFP).

=== Defense ===
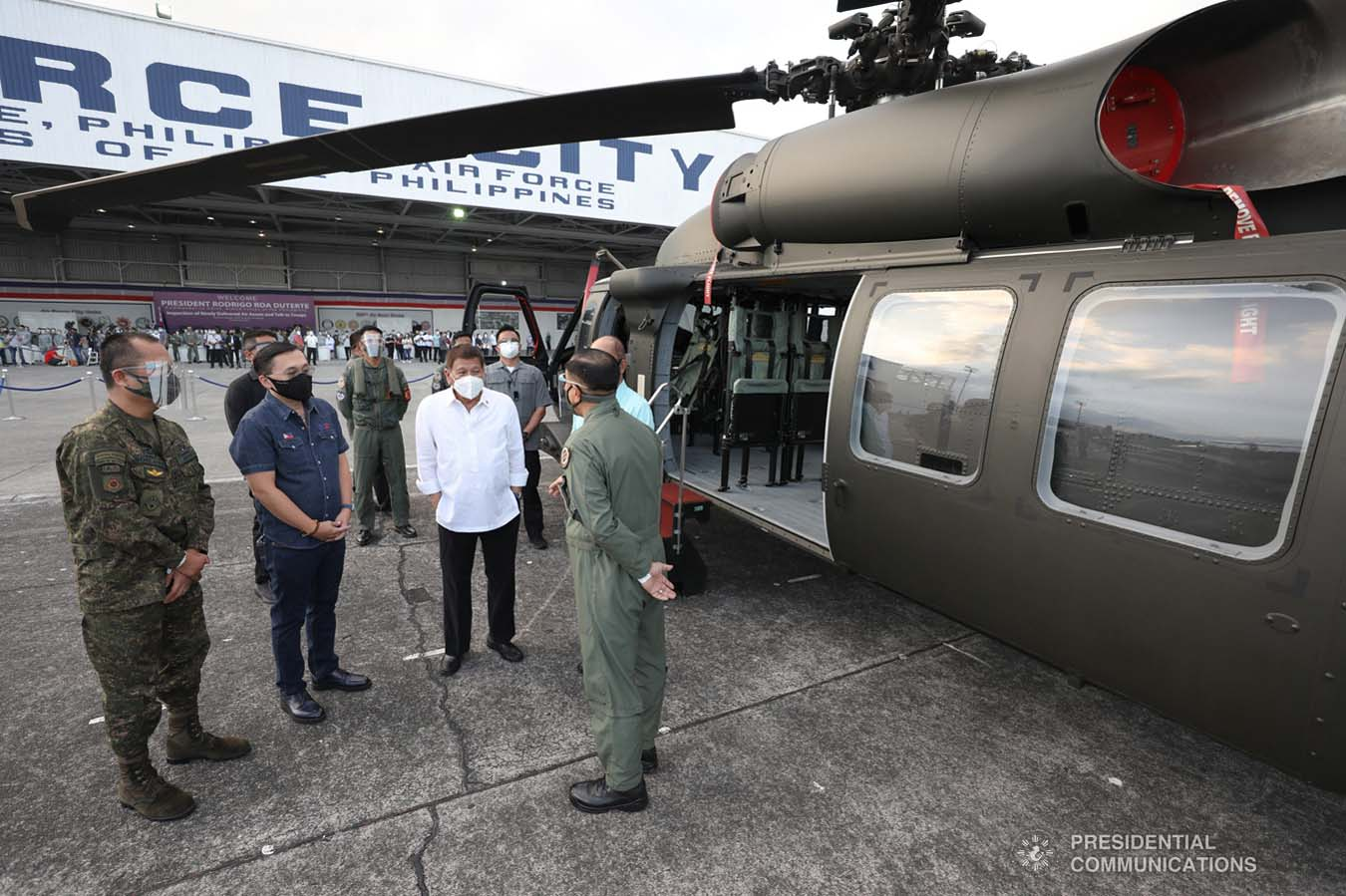
Duterte (in white shirt) inspects a newly delivered S-70i Black Hawk helicopter in Clark Air Base, Pampanga on February 12, 2021.

The Duterte administration committed to continue the 15-year modernization program of the AFP initiated by the Arroyo administration and revived by the Benigno Aquino III administration. In October 2016, the Duterte administration signed a contract with Hyundai Heavy Industries for two missile frigates worth ₱15.74 billion. The two frigates were delivered in 2020 and 2021, and were officially commissioned as BRP Jose Rizal (FF-150) and BRP Antonio Luna (FF-151), respectively.

On June 20, 2018, Duterte approved the ₱300 billion budget for Horizon 2, the second phase of the Revised AFP Modernization Program, which ran from 2018 to 2022. In February 2022, the Duterte administration signed a ₱32 billion deal to purchase 32 additional S-70i "Black Hawk" combat utility helicopters from PZL Mielec of Poland.

In April 2022, Duterte signed a law restricting the chief of staff and other senior AFP officers to a fixed, three-year term unless terminated earlier by the President. The law allows for extensions "in times of war or other national emergency declared by Congress".

By June 2022, Duterte's last month in office, 54 projects under the AFP Modernization Act and the Revised AFP Modernization Act had been completed.

=== Crime ===
Duterte ran a law-and-order campaign. He created a task force to ensure a safe environment for media workers and signed a law creating the Office of the Judiciary Marshals, which was tasked with ensuring the security and protection of judiciary personnel and property. He appointed at least 1,700 new prosecutors to the National Prosecution Service, and signed legislation prohibiting hazing in university organizations, increasing penalties for gender-based harassment in public places, and increasing protection of consumers against fraud. He strengthened the Anti-Trafficking in Persons Act, eased gun application requirements for those in danger, and ordered the shutdown of Ponzi-like investment firms. To strengthen border control, he implemented an Advance Passenger Information System. After he ordered a crackdown on loiterers in June 2018, the Philippine National Police (PNP) launched an anti-crime campaign.

Duterte failed in his bid to restore the death penalty (also known as capital punishment) in April 2017 when a bill to resume it for certain offenses stalled in the Senate and did not receive enough votes to pass.

The crime rate significantly dropped under Duterte's presidency, excluding killings related to the war on drugs. In October 2021, the PNP reported a 49.6% drop in crimes since July 2016. Police data showed that between 2016 and September 2021, 1.36 million crimes were reported, compared to the 2.67 million crimes reported between 2010 and 2015.

==== War on drugs ====
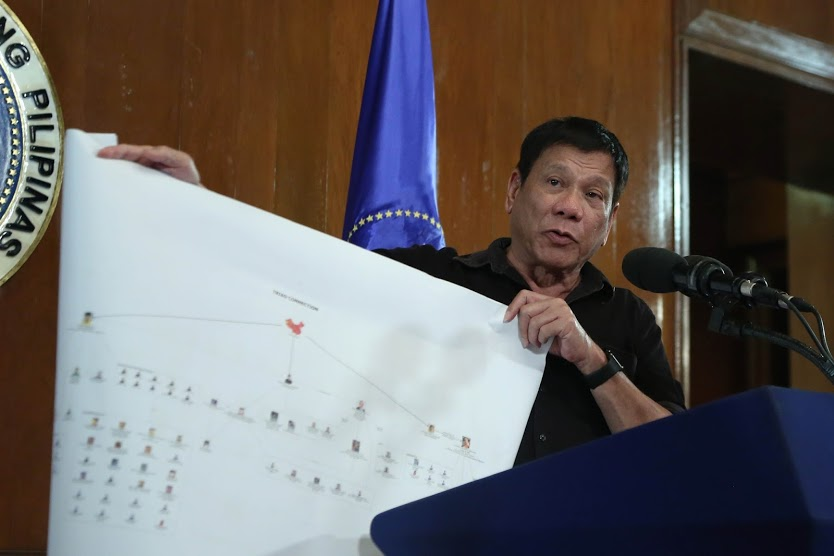
Duterte presents a chart which he claims illustrates a drug trade network of drug syndicates, on July 7, 2016.

Duterte, during his presidential campaign, warned the Philippines was at risk of becoming a narco-state and promised to fight the illegal drug trade. After his inauguration, the Philippine National Police (PNP) launched Oplan Tokhang, inviting identified drug suspects to surrender. Duterte identified three Chinese nationals who were alleged drug lords in the Philippines, and named 150 public officials allegedly involved in the illegal drug trade.

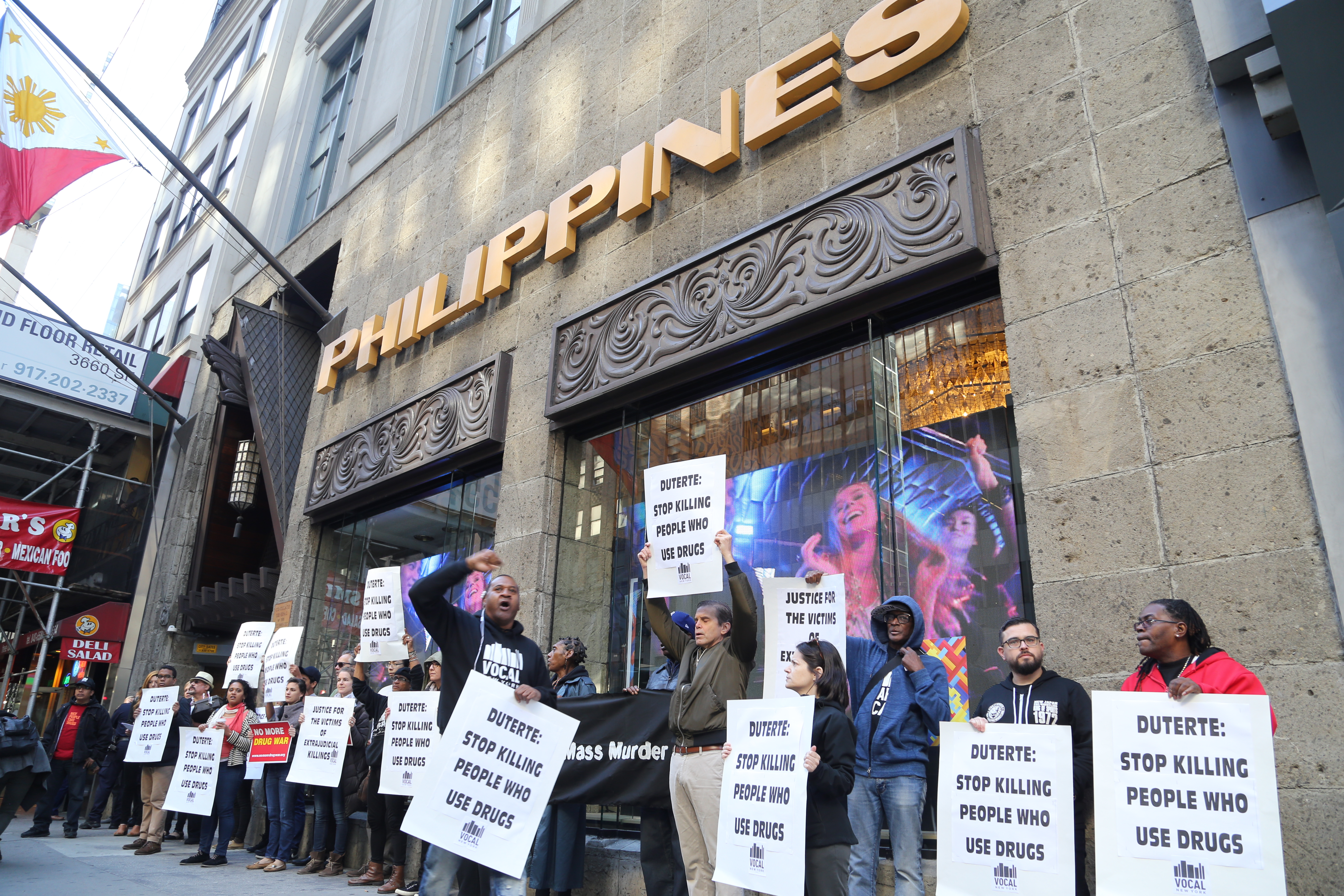
Protesters against the war on drugs gather in front of the Philippine Consulate General in New York City on October 11, 2016.

At the height of his anti-drugs campaign, Duterte urged the public and communists to kill drug dealers. Pardons were promised to police who shot drug dealers during anti-drug raids, prompting thousands to surrender. Rehab centers were built to accommodate them. Concerns arose locally and internationally due to the high number of suspects who died during police operations. In August 2016, opposition Senator Leila de Lima launched a Senate probe into the extrajudicial killings, using hitman Edgar Matobato of the alleged vigilante group Davao Death Squad as a witness. Matobato testified Duterte, then mayor of Davao City, was involved in extrajudicial killings in the city; Duterte called the allegation a "lie". The probe was terminated on October 13, 2016, for lack of evidence. De Lima was arrested for her alleged involvement in the New Bilibid Prison illegal drug trade.

In March 2017, Duterte created the Inter-agency Committee on Anti-illegal Drugs, led by the Philippine Drug Enforcement Agency, to tackle drug crime. Later that year, a lawyer filed a complaint with the International Criminal Court against Duterte and 11 officials for crimes against humanity.

In October 2017, due to public outrage over alleged police abuse in the continuing crackdown, Duterte prohibited the PNP from joining anti-drug raids and designated the PDEA as the "sole agency" in charge of the war on drugs. The PNP launched a recovery and wellness program for drug dependents in the same month. The PNP was allowed to rejoin the campaign in December 2017 with the PDEA still as the lead agency. In October 2018, Duterte signed an executive order institutionalizing the Philippine Anti-Illegal Drugs Strategy, allowing all government departments, state universities and colleges to implement their own strategies against the illegal drug trade.

Duterte has acknowledged that the war on drugs has been difficult to control due to the country's long coastline and corruption. He asked president-elect Bongbong Marcos to continue the war on drugs in his own way; Duterte declined an appointment offer as Marcos' drug czar, expressing a desire to retire. Despite international criticism, the war on drugs retained majority support among Filipinos. By February 2022, 58% of barangays had been declared drug-cleared as part of the Barangay Drug Clearing Program.

==== Withdrawal from the ICC ====
In November 2016, Duterte signaled his intention to withdraw the Philippines from the International Criminal Court (ICC) after an ICC prosecutor said the organization may have authority to prosecute the perpetrators of drug war deaths. Duterte maintained that the Rome Statute, which was ratified by the Senate in 2011, was never binding in the Philippines because it was never published in the Official Gazette. The withdrawal process began in March 2018 after the tribunal's chief prosecutor, Fatou Bensouda, launched a preliminary examination into crimes against humanity allegedly committed by Duterte and other officials in the war on drugs. The withdrawal took effect a year later on March 17, 2019. A Supreme Court (SC) ruling in March 2021 dismissed three petitions filed by the Philippine Coalition for the ICC, the Integrated Bar of the Philippines, and opposition senators challenging Duterte's withdrawal from the ICC on the grounds that the petitioners were unable to establish legal standing to challenge the action. The SC also ruled that the President has no "unbridled authority" to withdraw from treaties.

On September 16, 2021, the ICC authorized a formal investigation into the war on drugs in the Philippines, focusing on crimes committed between 2016 and March 2019. The Philippine government requested a deferral of the probe in November 2021, which was suspended by the ICC to assess the request. However, on June 26, 2022, ICC prosecutor Karim Ahmad Khan concluded that the request was "not warranted" and requested the pre-trial chamber of the ICC to immediately resume the investigation.

==== Anti-corruption ====
Duterte signed the Freedom of Information executive order and created the Presidential Anti-Corruption Commission to combat corruption in the executive branch. He launched the 8888 Citizens' Complaint Hotline, allowing the public to report corruption and poor government services.

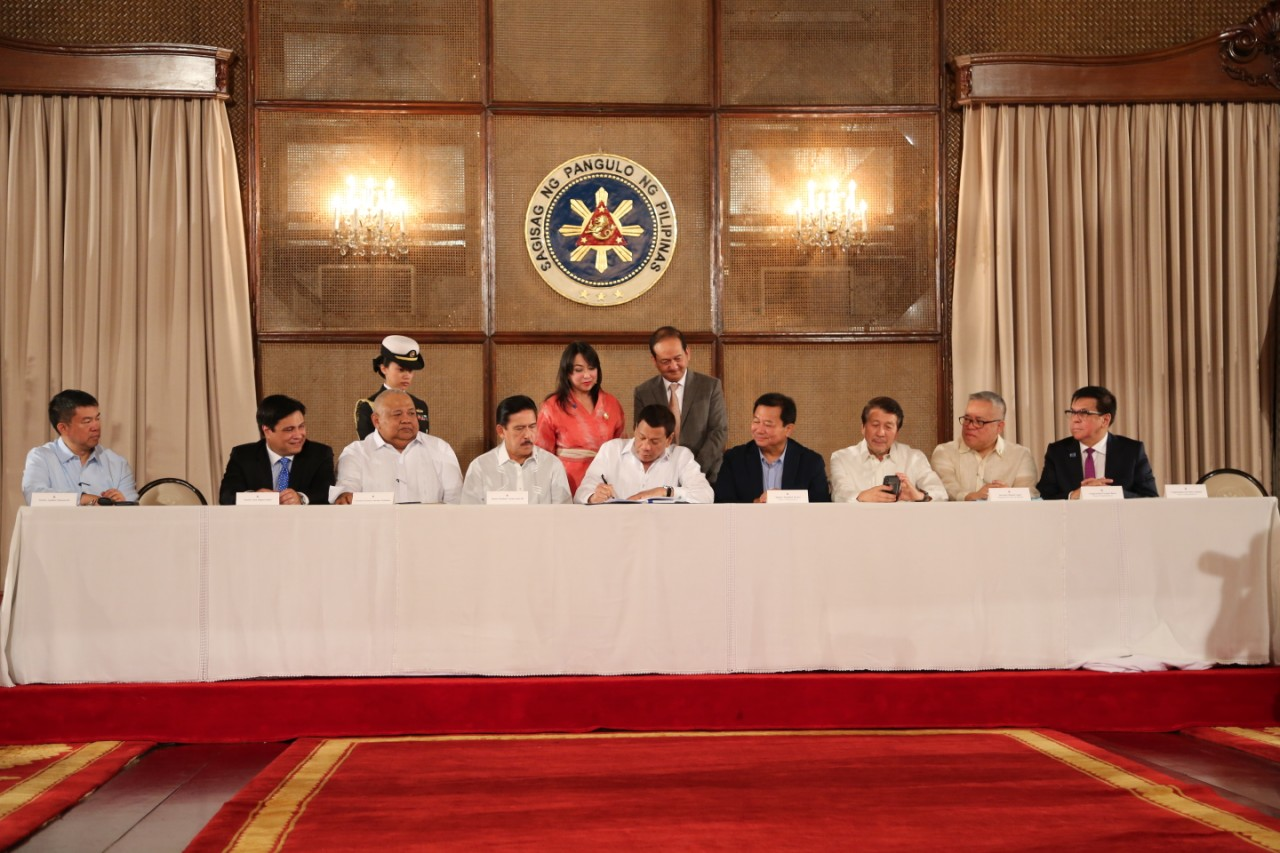
Duterte (center) signs into law the Ease of Doing Business and Efficient Government Service Delivery Act of 2018.

To reduce bureaucracy and processing time, in 2018, Duterte signed into law the Ease of Doing Business Act. A law he signed in December 2020 allows the President to expedite permits, licenses, and certifications during national emergencies.

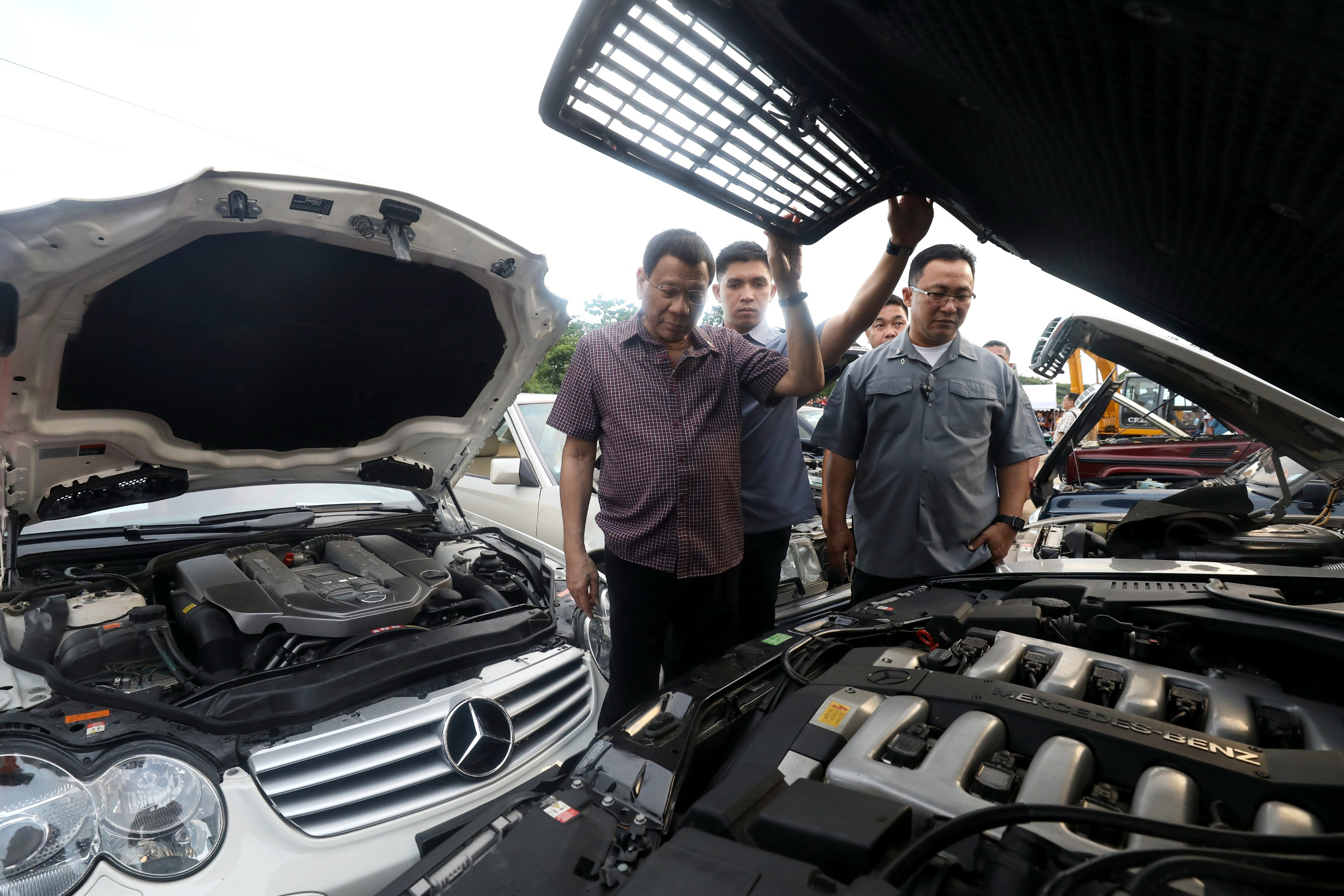
Duterte inspects smuggled luxury cars before they were destroyed at Port Irene in Santa Ana, Cagayan on March 14, 2018.

Duterte had a policy of destroying smuggled luxury vehicles to discourage smugglers. He made threats against big businesses over unpaid debts to the government, leading Philippine Airlines and Mighty Corporation to pay their debts. In March 2019, he abolished the Road Board, stating that agency was "nothing but a depository of money and for corruption".

Duterte on June 4, 2019, ordered the Presidential Commission on Good Government to auction the ₱700 million worth of Imelda Marcos' jewelry collection, although as of June 1, 2022, an auction date had yet to be announced. In August 2020, Duterte ordered the Department of Justice (DOJ) to investigate corruption allegations within the Philippine Health Insurance Corporation (PhilHealth). On October 27, he ordered the DOJ's investigation and a newly created taskforce to investigate corruption within the government.

==== Presidential pardons and amnesty ====
Early in his term, Duterte pardoned several communist rebels and political prisoners while pursuing peace talks. He also granted pardons to elderly and sickly prisoners, as well as upperclassmen and graduating cadets from the Philippine Military Academy and Philippine National Police Academy with outstanding punishments and demerits. In November 2016, he granted an absolute pardon to actor Robin Padilla, who was convicted in 1994 for illegal possession of firearms.

In August 2018, Duterte revoked the amnesty of his staunch critic Senator Antonio Trillanes, saying the amnesty that was granted in 2010 by President Benigno Aquino III was void ab initio because Trillanes did not apply for it, and refused to admit guilt for his roles in the 2003 Oakwood Mutiny and the 2007 Manila Peninsula siege.

On September 7, 2020, Duterte granted an absolute pardon and early release to US Lance Corporal Joseph Scott Pemberton, who was serving time for murdering Jennifer Laude in Olongapo. Pemberton was released due to good behavior after serving less than six years in prison.

In February 2021, Duterte signed an executive order creating the National Amnesty Commission, which was tasked with processing applications for amnesty for former rebels. He signed four proclamations granting amnesty to members of the Moro National Liberation Front, the Moro Islamic Liberation Front, the communist movement, the Rebolusyonaryong Partido ng Manggagawa ng Pilipinas, the Revolutionary Proletarian Army, and the Alex Boncayao Brigade. However, upon leaving office, Duterte failed to constitute the commission, leaving his successor, Bongbong Marcos, yet to appoint its officials beyond his first 100 days.

=== Federalism and constitutional reform ===
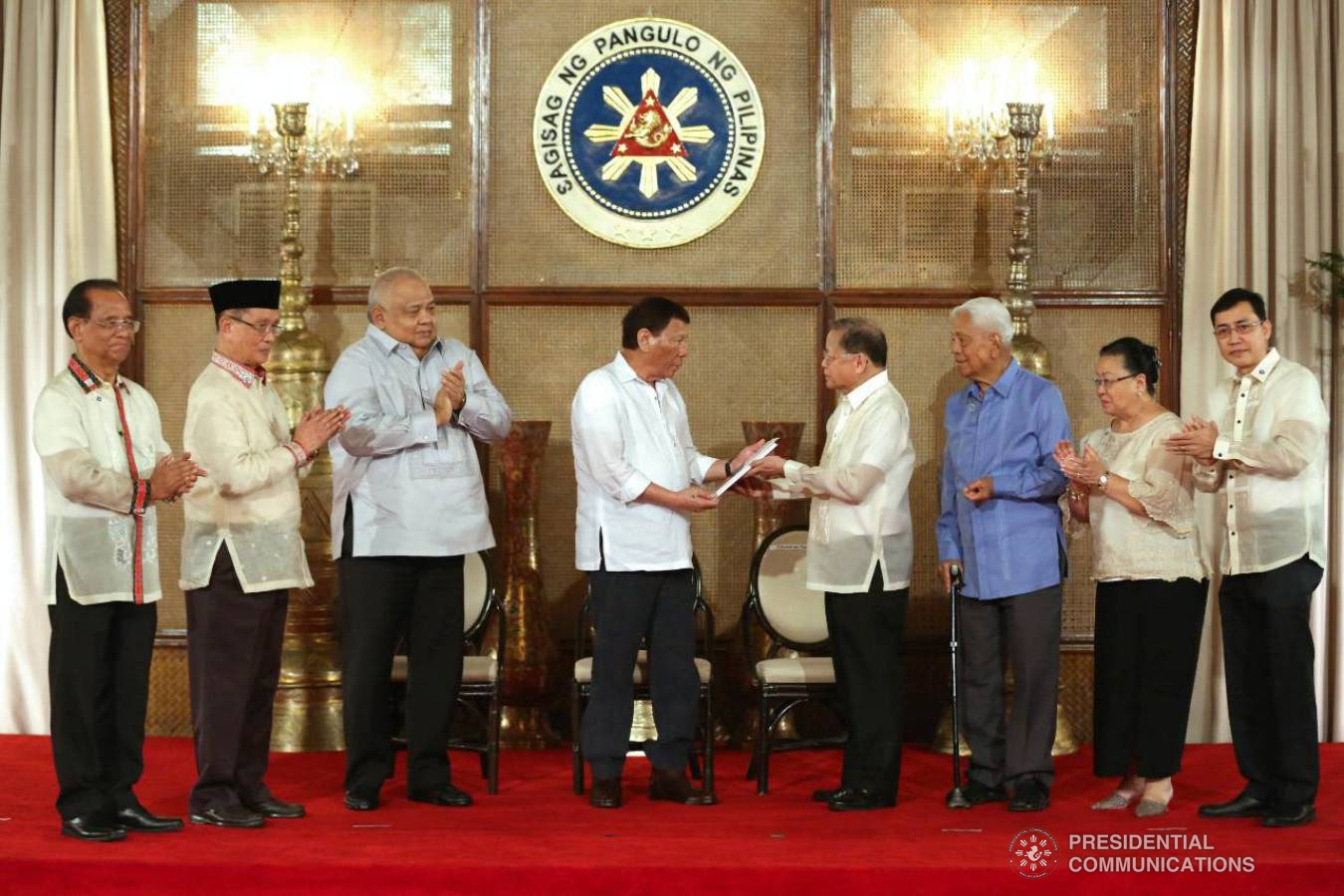
Duterte receives from retired Chief Justice Reynato Puno the proposed federal constitution of the Consultative Committee on July 9, 2018.

Duterte advocated federalism as a better system of governance for the Philippines, arguing that the Internal Revenue Allotment disproportionately benefits Metro Manila and that he would end his term early if federalism was instated.

On December 7, 2016, Duterte signed an executive order creating a 25-member consultative committee to review the 1987 Constitution within six months. On January 23, 2018, he appointed former Chief Justice Reynato Puno as chairman along with other experts and officials. The committee approved a federal charter banning political dynasties, political turncoatism, and oligopolies, and granted more power to the Ombudsman and Commission on Audit. On October 8, however, the House Committee on Constitutional Amendments passed a new draft of the federal constitution filed by House Speaker Gloria Macapagal-Arroyo, which removed several provisions and eliminated term limits for Congress members, and removed the vice president from the presidential line of succession. The House of Representatives passed the draft, but the Senate rejected it.

Early in his term, Duterte raised the idea of a revolutionary government but later rejected it. He criticized the party-list system and called for its abolition, saying it was no longer representative of the marginalized.

In June 2019, Duterte said federalism might not be established during his presidency. He later said at a democracy summit hosted by US President Joe Biden that he had failed in his bid to establish a federal system in the country due to lack of congressional support.

On June 1, 2021, Duterte issued an executive order for the devolution of some executive functions to local governments.

=== Agriculture ===
The agricultural sector was in decline under the Benigno Aquino III administration, but saw 6.3% growth in Duterte's first year. However, despite growth in other sectors, Duterte's administration struggled to revive the farm sector, which has continued to decline.

Republic Act No. 11203 (Rice Tariffication Law) signed by Duterte on February 2, 2018, liberalized rice imports.

Inflation in 2018 led to the Rice Tariffication Law (RTL) being enacted in 2019, which ended the National Food Authority's monopoly on rice imports. The RTL replaced import limits with a 35% tariff, with revenue going to a Rice Competitiveness Enhancement Fund to support farmers. Despite criticism, the law gained support from business groups, and retail rice prices stabilized. In 2019, Duterte authorized the Department of Agriculture to use tariff funds for cash assistance to small farmers.

Duterte signed a law easing Commonwealth era restrictions on agricultural patents, allowing land titles to be immediately available for trade. The Sagip Saka Act was signed in 2019, promoting enterprise development for farmers and fishermen to boost their incomes and strengthen the direct purchase of agricultural goods. Certification of organic produce was made more accessible and affordable. In 2020, Duterte provided new agricultural graduates with up to three hectares (7.4 acres) of land to encourage young people to enter agriculture and avoid a farmer shortage. In an effort to help farmers and lower the prices of agricultural products, the Duterte administration relaunched the Kadiwa program of President Ferdinand Marcos, allowing farmers to directly sell their produce to consumers.

In February 2018, Duterte signed a law providing free irrigation for farmers owning up to eight hectares (20 acres) of land, benefiting about 1.033 million farmers by December 2021. In February 2021, a law creating a trust fund for coconut farmers was signed, and in June 2022, an executive order implementing the Coconut Farmers and Industry Development Plan was issued, facilitating the release of ₱75 billion of coco levy assets declared state property by the Supreme Court.

In 2019, African swine fever prompted the Philippine government to tighten animal quarantine and ban pork imports. Over three million hogs were culled from 2020 to 2021, causing a supply deficit and higher pork prices. In response, Duterte lowered import tariffs on pork for one year and initiated a repopulation program. On May 10, 2021, Duterte declared a state of calamity due to the continued spread of the disease.

By July 2021, the Duterte administration had completed 2,025 kilometres (1,258 miles) of farm-to-market roads and 94.99 kilometres (59.02 miles) of farm-to-mill roads under the Build! Build! Build! program.

=== Disaster resilience ===
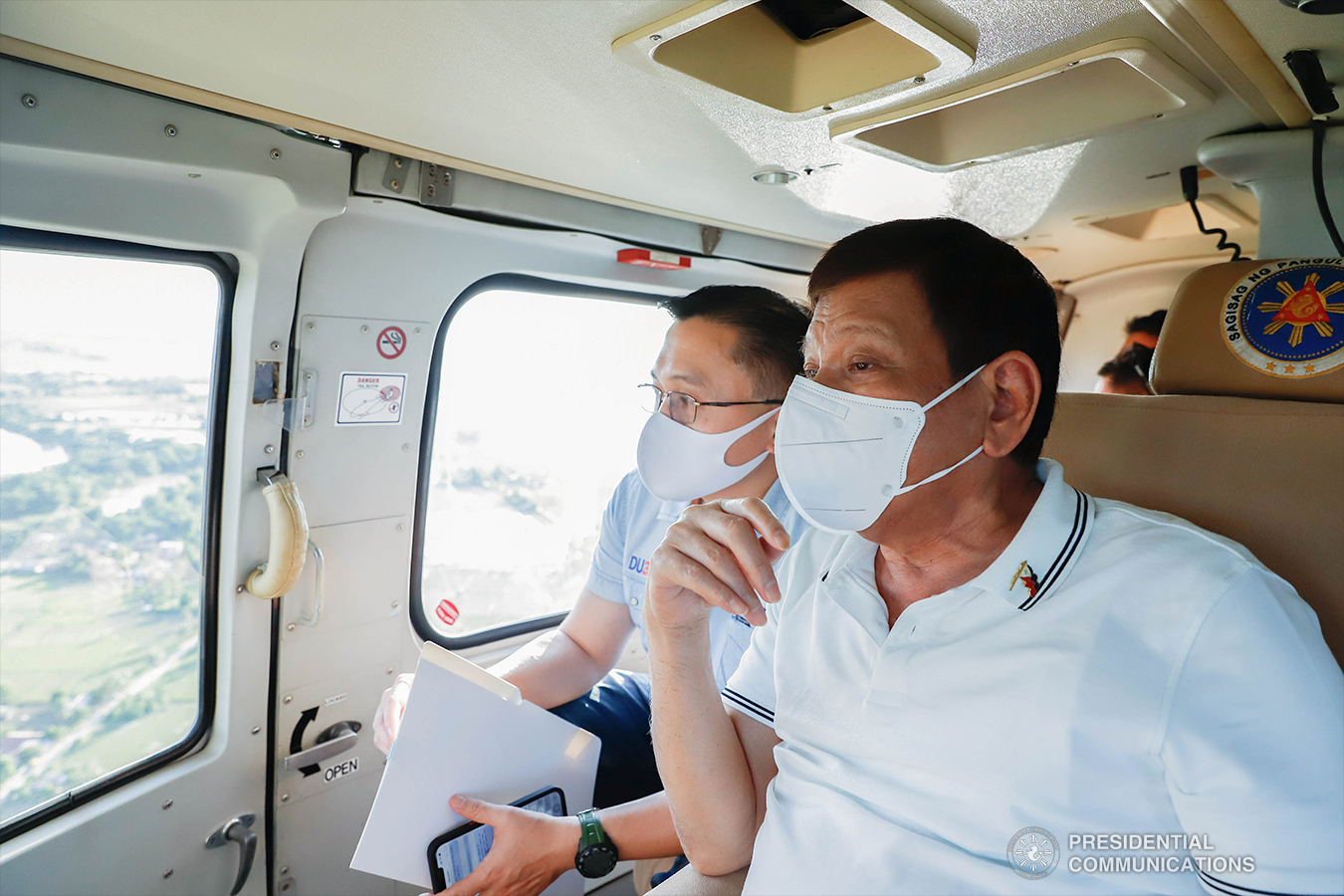
Duterte and Senator Bong Go during an aerial inspection of areas affected by Tropical Storm Agaton in Capiz on April 16, 2022

Since 2017, Duterte called for the creation of the Department of Disaster Resilience to administer disaster response and rehabilitation, but the bill was opposed by some senators over concerns about bureaucracy. In 2019, Duterte approved GeoRisk PH, a multi-agency initiative to serve as the central resource for natural hazard and risk-assessment information.

Following the 2020 Taal Volcano eruption, Duterte called for the construction of more evacuation centers in disaster-prone areas; by July 2021, 223 new evacuation centers had been constructed under the Build! Build! Build! program. After typhoons Rolly and Ulysses hit the country, Duterte issued an executive order creating the Build Back Better Task Force, a permanent inter-agency body responsible for post-disaster rehabilitation and recovery in affected areas. In September 2021, Duterte signed the BFP Modernization Act, mandating a 10-year program to modernize the Bureau of Fire Protection and expanding its mandate to include disaster-risk response and emergency management. In April 2022, the government inaugurated three evacuation centers in Batangas province outside the 14-kilometer (8.7 mi) Taal Volcano danger zone.

=== Economy ===
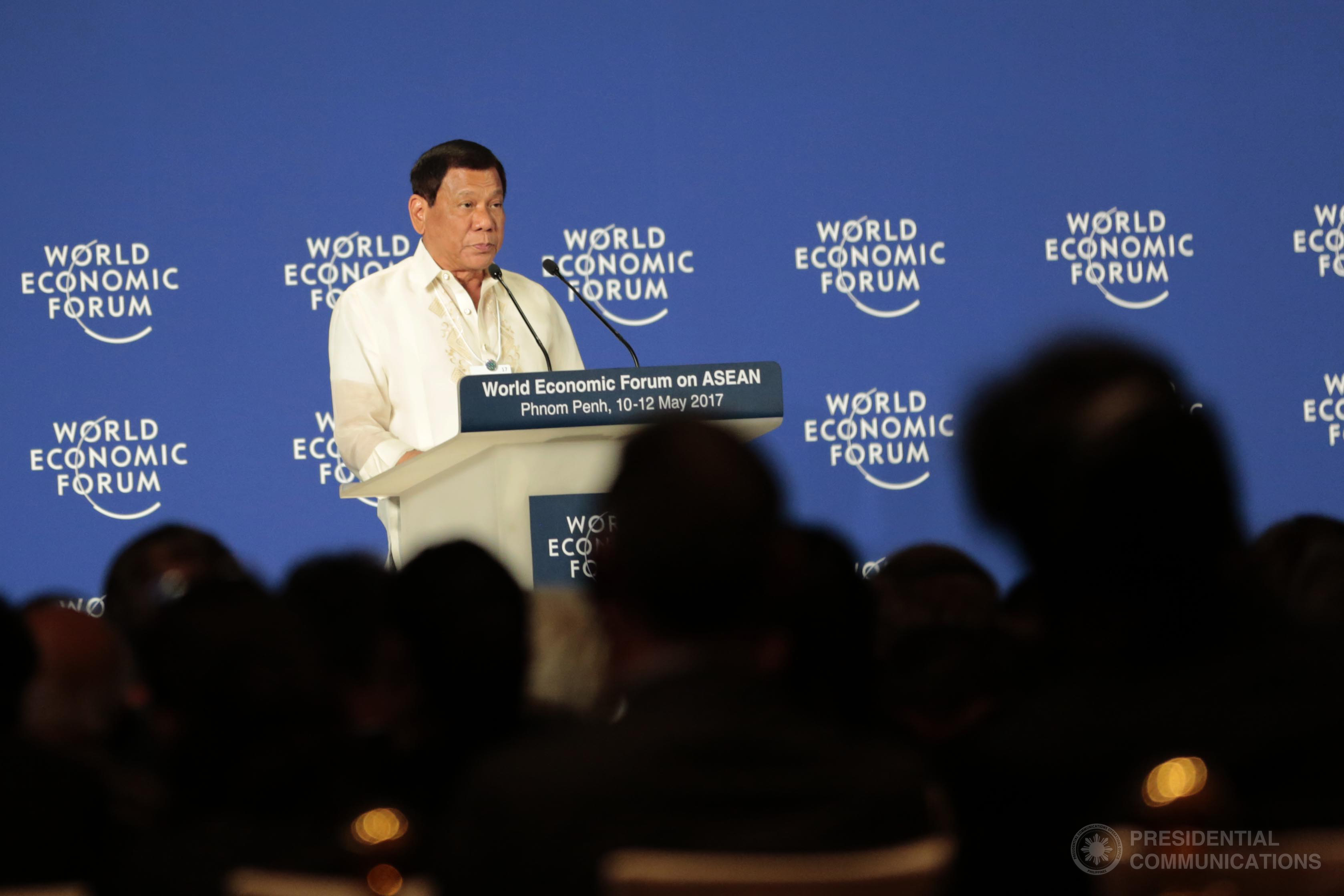
Duterte speaks at the World Economic Forum in Phnom Penh, Cambodia, May 11, 2017

Real GDP growth rate (year-on-year) under the Duterte administration
Year	Quarter	Growth rate
2016	3rd	7.3%
2016	4th	6.9%
2017	1st	6.4%
2017	2nd	7.2%
2017	3rd	7.5%
2017	4th	6.6%
2018	1st	6.5%
2018	2nd	6.4%
2018	3rd	6.1%
2018	4th	6.4%
2019	1st	5.9%
2019	2nd	5.6%
2019	3rd	6.3%
2019	4th	6.6%
2020	1st	-0.7%
2020	2nd	-16.9%
2020	3rd	-11.6%
2020	4th	-8.2%
2021	1st	-3.8%
2021	2nd	12.1%
2021	3rd	7.0%
2021	4th	7.8%
2022	1st	8.2%
2022	2nd	7.4%

Duterte inherited from the Aquino III administration a strong economy but limited public-infrastructure investment. He promised to continue Aquino's macroeconomic policies while increasing infrastructure spending through his economic team's 10-point socio-economic agenda. To attract more investors by easing restrictions on international retailers, Duterte signed into law amendments to both the Foreign Investment Act of 1991 and the 85-year old Public Service Act. His administration took initiatives to support micro, small and medium enterprises (MSMEs) by launching a microfinance program as an alternative to predatory private loans and significantly increasing the creation of Negosyo Centers that provide efficient services for MSMEs. To address rising inflation following the devastation caused by Typhoon Ompong in September 2018, Duterte signed an administrative order removing non-tariff barriers on agricultural imports. In February 2019, he signed a law updating the 38-year-old Corporation Code of the Philippines to allow a single person to form a corporation. After several more reforms such as the Ease of Doing Business law, the Philippines' ease-of-doing-business ranking improved from 124th to 95th, according to the World Bank's 2020 Doing Business Report.

In 2020, the COVID-19 pandemic caused the Philippine economy to enter a recession following government lockdowns and restrictions. Gross domestic product (GDP) shrunk by 9.5% in 2020, prompting the administration to loosen restrictions to revive the economy. GDP recovered to 5.6% in 2021 after the administration initiated a nationwide vaccination drive and eased pandemic-related restrictions; simultaneously, the country's debt-to-GDP ratio rose from 39.6% in pre-pandemic 2020 to 60.4% as of June 2021 due to loans incurred by the government to address the pandemic.

On March 21, 2022, Duterte signed an executive order adopting a 10-point policy agenda to hasten economic recovery from the COVID-19 pandemic. To reduce the country's debt, which rose to ₱12.68 trillion as of March 2022, in May that year, the Duterte administration's economic team proposed to the incoming Marcos administration a fiscal consolidation plan containing corrective tax measures including the expansion of value-added tax to raise government revenues. By the second quarter of 2022, the Philippine economy had grown by 7.4%, making the country the second-fastest growing economy in Southeast Asia.

==== Infrastructure development ====
To reduce poverty, encourage economic growth, and reduce congestion in Metro Manila, the Duterte administration launched Build! Build! Build! (BBB); a comprehensive infrastructure program, on April 18, 2017. The program was part of the administration's socioeconomic policy, which aimed to start a "Golden Age of Infrastructure" by increasing spending on public infrastructure from 5.4% of the country's GDP in 2017 to 7.4% in 2022. In 2017, the administration shifted its infrastructure funding policy from public-private partnerships (PPPs) of previous administrations to government revenues and official development assistance (ODA), particularly from Japan and China. From October 2019, the government worked with the private sector to provide additional funding.

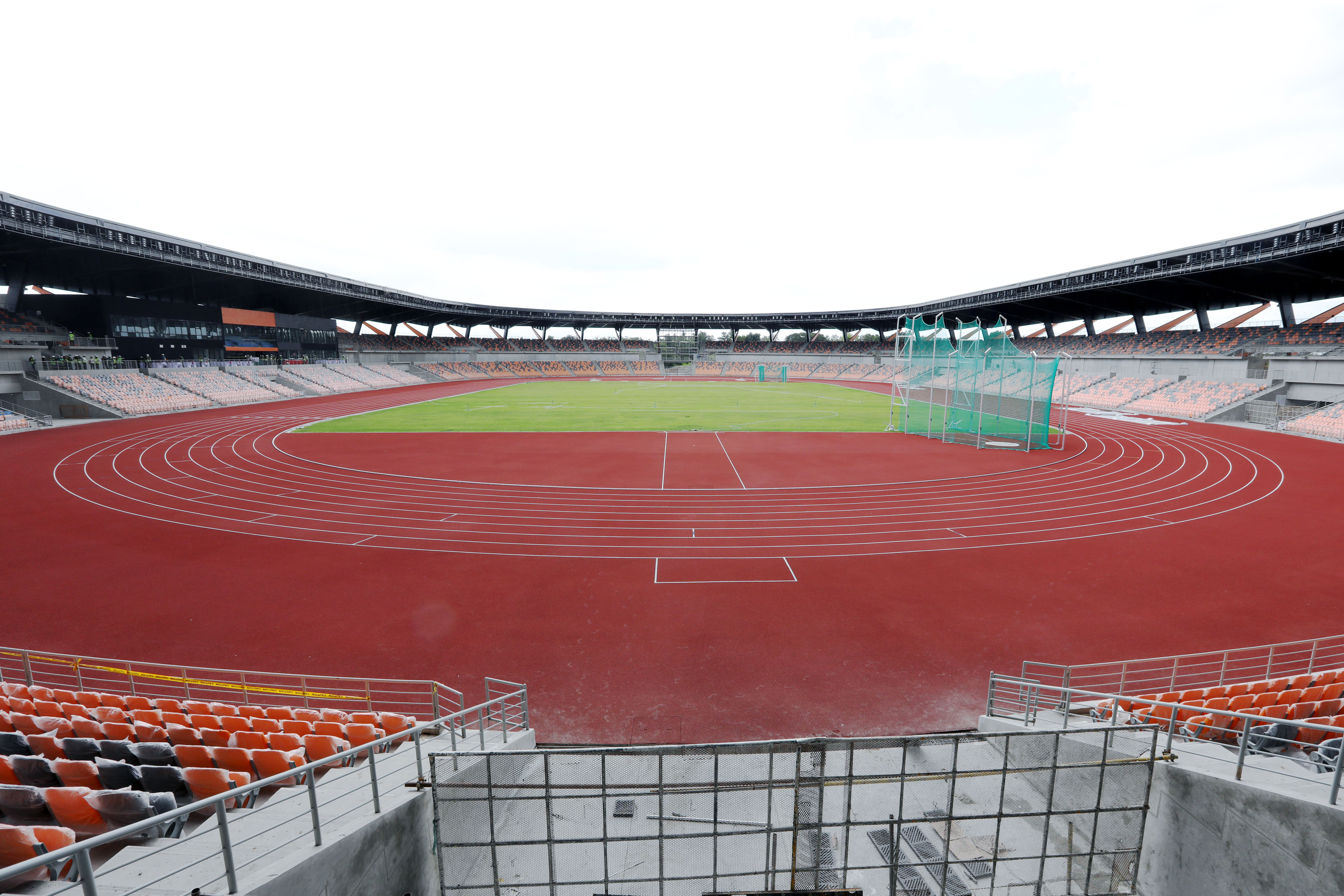
The Athletic Stadium of the New Clark City sports complex, completed on October 12, 2019, 50 days before the opening of the 2019 Southeast Asian Games.

In November 2019, the administration revised its list of Infrastructure Flagship Projects (IFPs) under the BBB program from 75 to 100, then to 104, and to 112 in 2020, expanding its scope to health, information-and-communications technology, and water infrastructure projects to support the country's economic growth and recovery from the COVID-19 pandemic. Some major projects included the Subic-Clark Railway, the North–South Commuter Railway from New Clark City to Calamba, Laguna, the Metro Manila Subway, the expansion of Clark International Airport the Mindanao Railway (Tagum-Davao-Digos Segment), and the Luzon Spine Expressway Network By April 2022, 12 IFPs had been completed while 88, which were at an advanced stage, were passed to the succeeding administration for completion.

From June 2016 to July 2021, 29,264 km (18,184 mi) of roads, 5,950 bridges, 11,340 flood-control projects, 222 evacuation centers, 150,149 school classrooms, and 653 COVID-19 facilities were completed.

==== Taxation ====
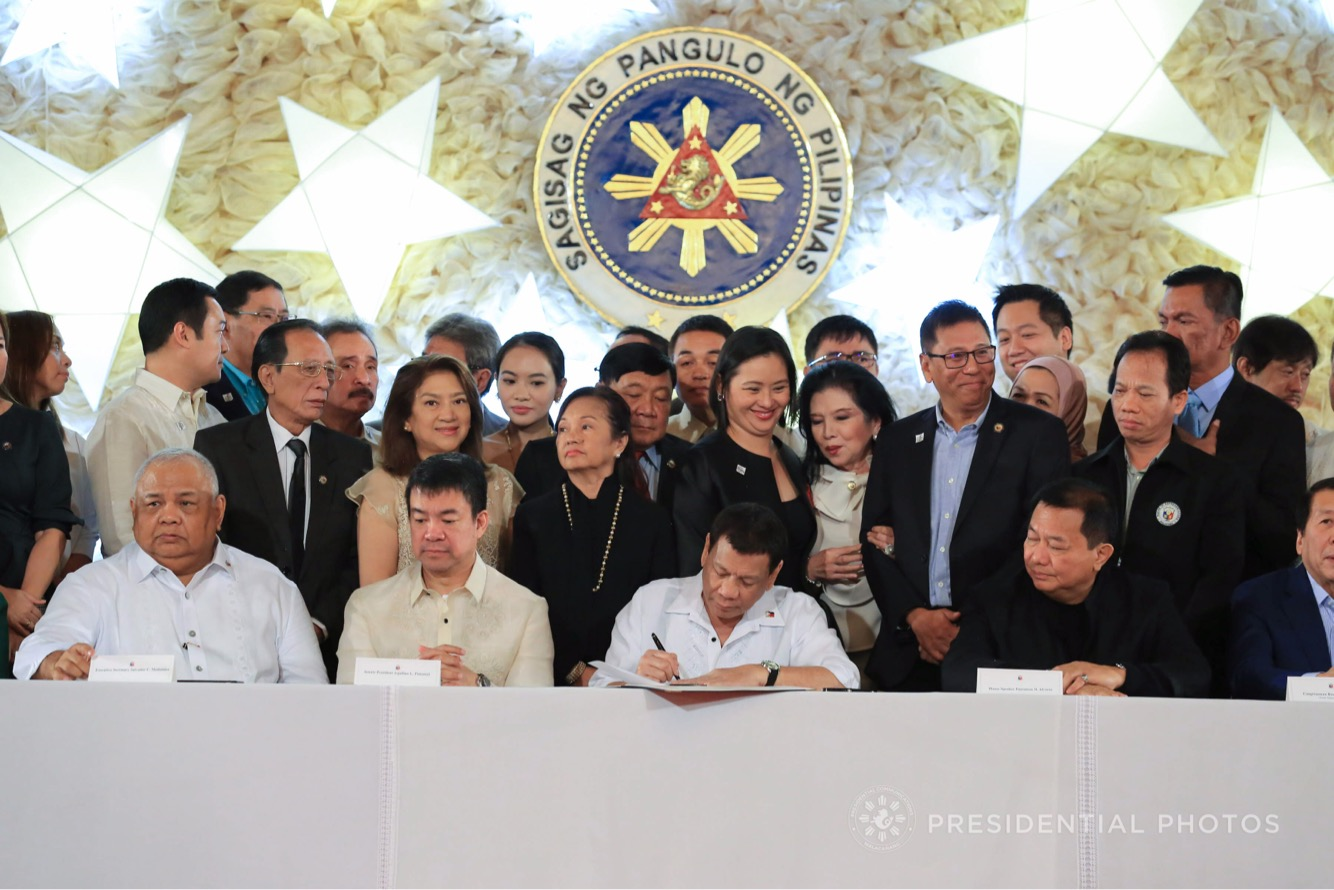
Duterte (seated, center) signs the TRAIN Law and 2018 General Appropriations Act at the Malacañang Palace on December 19, 2017.

The Duterte administration initiated a comprehensive tax reform program. The program's first package the Tax Reform for Acceleration and Inclusion Law (TRAIN Law) adjusted tax rates by excluding those earning an annual taxable income of ₱250,000 from paying personal income tax; the law also raised excise taxes on vehicles, sugar-sweetened beverages, petroleum products, and tobacco and other non-essential goods to generate funds for the administration's massive infrastructure program. The second package, the Corporate Recovery and Tax Incentives for Enterprises Act (CREATE Act), lowered corporate income tax from 30% to 25% to attract investment and maintain fiscal stability. Sin taxes on tobacco, vapor products, alcohol, and electronic cigarettes were raised to fund the Universal Health Care Act, and reduce incidents of smoking-related and alcohol-related diseases. A tax amnesty Duterte signed into law in February 2019 granted errant taxpayers a one-time opportunity to affordably settle their tax liabilities while raising government revenue for infrastructure and social projects.

Duterte signed a law imposing a 5% tax on gross gaming revenues of offshore gaming operators. In March 2019, he signed a law excluding small-scale miners from paying income and excise taxes on gold they sell to the central bank.

==== Trade ====
On September 2, 2021, Duterte ratified the Regional Comprehensive Economic Partnership (RCEP) Agreement, an ASEAN-led free trade agreement involving 10 ASEAN members and Australia, China, Japan, Korea, and New Zealand; the agreement was sent to the Senate but the Senate's May 2022 election break delayed ratification. In June 2022, the Senate deferred the agreement's ratification to the incoming 19th Congress after some senators raised concerns over the lack of safeguards for the country's agricultural sector, and to provide an opportunity for president-elect Bongbong Marcos to review the agreement.

=== Education ===
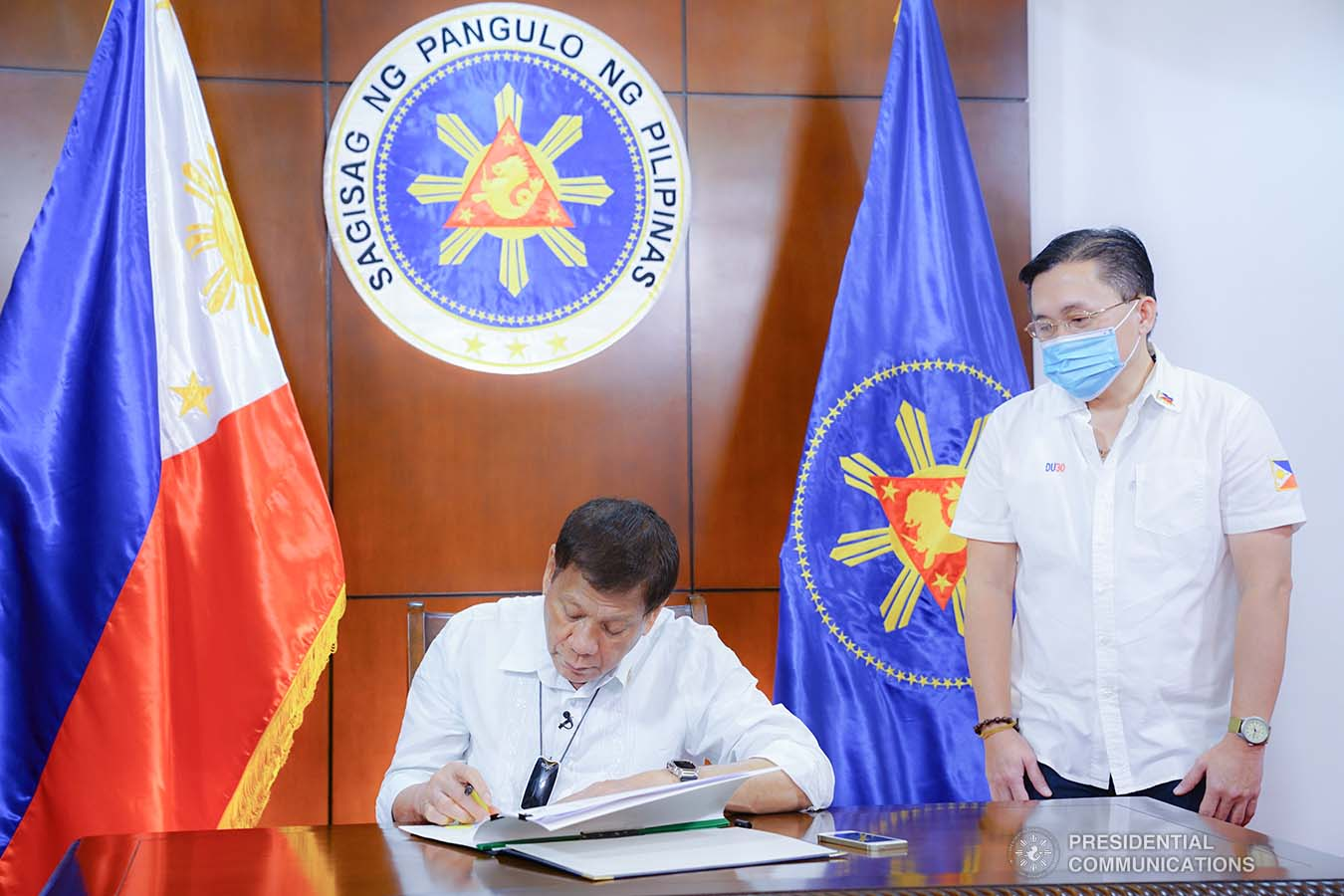
Duterte signs into law the establishment of the National Academy of Sports on June 9, 2020.

Duterte continued the K–12 implementation that started on May 20, 2008, due to the filing of Omnibus Education Reform Act of 2008 and ASEAN Charter on December 15, 2008, during Gloria Macapagal Arroyo's presidency and continued under Arroyo's successor and Duterte's predecessor Benigno Aquino III. It spanned for 9 years from 2008 until June 5, 2017, during which K–12 was implemented on Grade 6 and now in full use since then; this entirely phased out the K–4th Year system first used on May 28, 1945.

Stressing that the long-term benefits of education would outweigh any budgetary problems, in August 2017, Duterte signed a landmark law granting free tuition at all state universities and colleges (SUCs). He enacted laws which institutionalized the alternative learning system (ALS); mandated free access to technical-vocational education; granted inclusive education for disabled learners; accorded medical scholarships for deserving students in higher education; established a scholarship program for students on teacher-degree programs; instituted a career-guidance and counselling program for all secondary schools; and created the country's National Academy of Sports in New Clark City. In education curriculum, significant laws he signed included restoring Good Manners and Right Conduct (GMRC) and Values Education in the K-12 basic education; establishing transnational higher education that allows foreign universities to offer degree programs in the Philippines; integrating labor education in the higher-education curriculum; requiring the creation of curricula concerning energy-efficient, sustainable technologies; and declaring Filipino Sign Language as the national sign language and including it as a subject in the curriculum for deaf students.

At the peak of the COVID-19 pandemic in mid-2020, Duterte rejected the resumption of face-to-face classes in COVID-19 low-risk areas until vaccines became available in the country, saying he would not risk endangering students and teachers. On October 5, 2020, the Department of Education (DepEd) reopened classes, implementing distance and blended learning. Prompted by the detrimental effects of distance learning on students' mental health, in September 2021, Duterte approved a two-month pilot test of limited, face-to-face classes in COVID-19 low-risk areas; in January 2022, he approved the DepEd's suggestion to expand face-to-face classes.

By the end of Duterte's term, 1.97 million students in 220 higher education institutions were granted free tuition from the academic years (AYs) 2018–2019 up until AY 2021–2022, while 364,168 grantees used tertiary-education subsidies and benefits from the administration's Tulong Dunong Program in the same period.

=== Energy ===
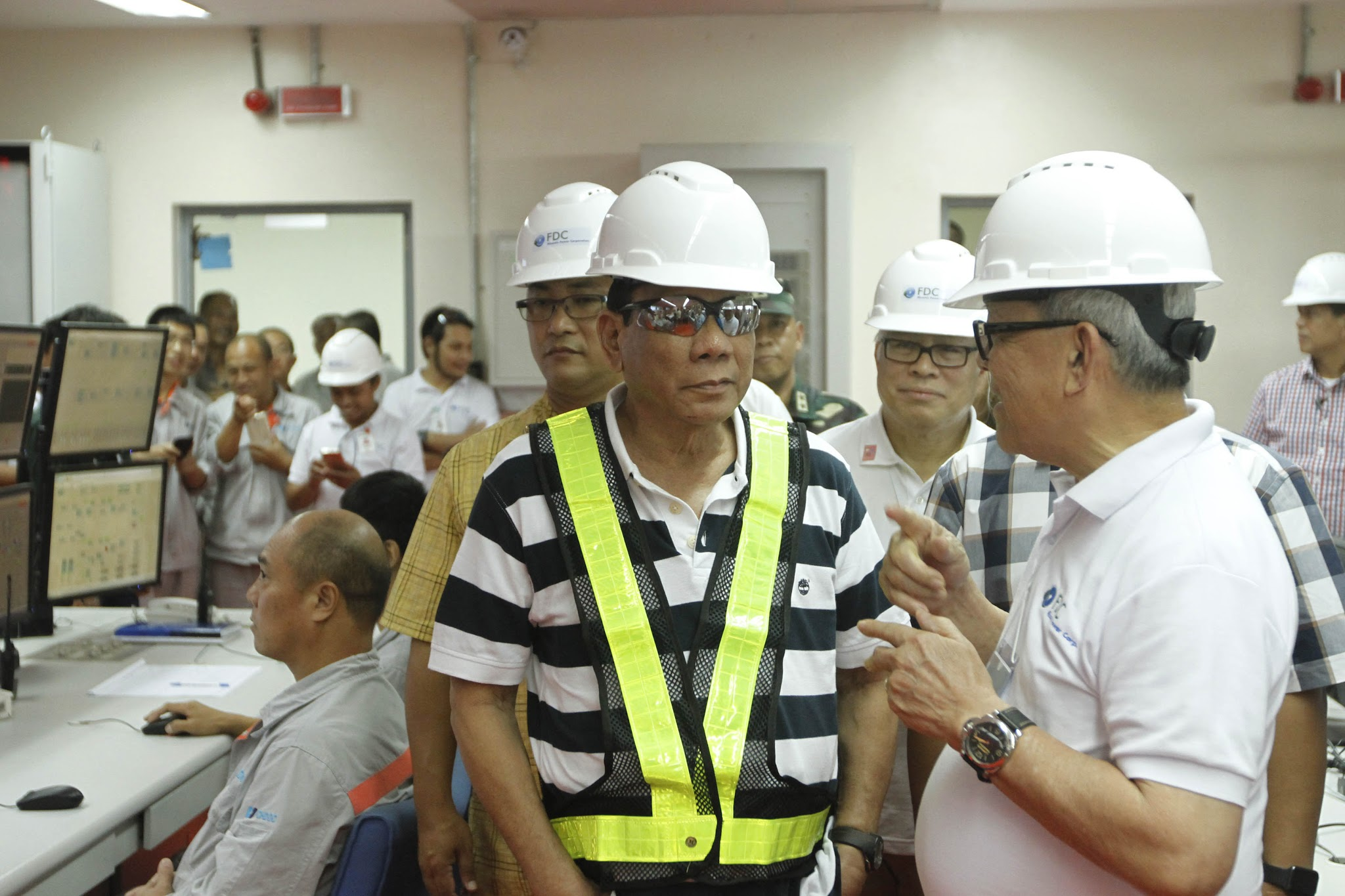
Duterte inspects a coal thermal plant in Villanueva, Misamis Oriental on September 22, 2016.

Early in Duterte's presidency, his administration adopted a "technology neutral" policy in energy and refused to end the use of coal because the Philippines' carbon footprint was not significant compared to those of more-developed Western nations. After Duterte in July 2019 issued a directive to cut coal dependence and fast-track a transition to renewable energy, in October 2020, the administration ended its energy neutrality policy and issued a moratorium on the construction of new coal-fired power plants.

To improve the electrification and power-generating capacity of the country, Duterte signed a law promoting the use of microgrid systems in unserved and under-served areas, and established the inter-agency Energy Investment Coordinating Council, which was tasked with simplifying the approval process of major projects. The administration pursued the liberalization of the energy sector; in October 2020, the Philippines started allowing 100% foreign ownership in large-scale geothermal projects.

The administration sought new energy sources and partnered with foreign companies to study the use of hydrogen as an energy source. In October 2020, with the impending depletion of the Malampaya gas field, Duterte approved the Department of Energy's (DOE) recommendation to lift the moratorium on oil-and-gas exploration in the South China Sea imposed by President Benigno Aquino III in 2012. In February 2022, Duterte signed an executive order approving the inclusion of nuclear power in the country's energy mix.

In September 2021, the DOE reported the country's energy capacity increased from 21,424 megawatts in 2016 to 26,287 megawatts in 2020, and household-electrification level rose from 90.7% in 2016 to 94.5% in 2020.

=== Environment ===
Duterte signed the Paris Agreement on Climate Change in March 2017. He declared parts of the Philippine Rise as a marine protected area, and significantly increased the number of protected areas in the country by signing the E-NIPAS Act of 2018. Duterte in April to May 2019 escalated a waste dispute with Canada, which led Canada to repatriate tons of refuse it sent to the Philippines in 2013 and 2014. Under Duterte's presidency, the Department of Environment and Natural Resources (DENR) completed the closure of all 335 open dumpsites in the country and subsequently required local authorities to convert the dumpsites into sanitary landfills.

Duterte in May 2017 appointed former military chief Roy Cimatu as the DENR secretary to replace his first appointee, environmental activist Gina Lopez, after the Commission on Appointments rejected Lopez's reappointment; Lopez was criticized following her decision to close 23 mining operations in functional watersheds and suspend six others in February 2017. To boost the COVID-19 pandemic-afflicted economy, in April 2021, Duterte lifted the nine-year moratorium on new mining agreements imposed by the Aquino administration in 2012; Cimatu in December 2021 repealed the ban on open-pit mining on copper, gold, silver, and complex ores imposed by Lopez in 2017. Following Duterte's directive to investigate reports of illegal logging and mining, in January 2021, Department of the Interior and Local Government (DILG) secretary Eduardo Año ordered the Philippine National Police to begin a campaign against illegal logging. A few days before Duterte left office, his administration withdrew the Philippines from the Extractive Industries Transparency Initiative (EITI) on grounds that EITI's quality assurance assessment process was "subjective, biased and unfair".

==== Boracay and Manila Bay cleanup ====
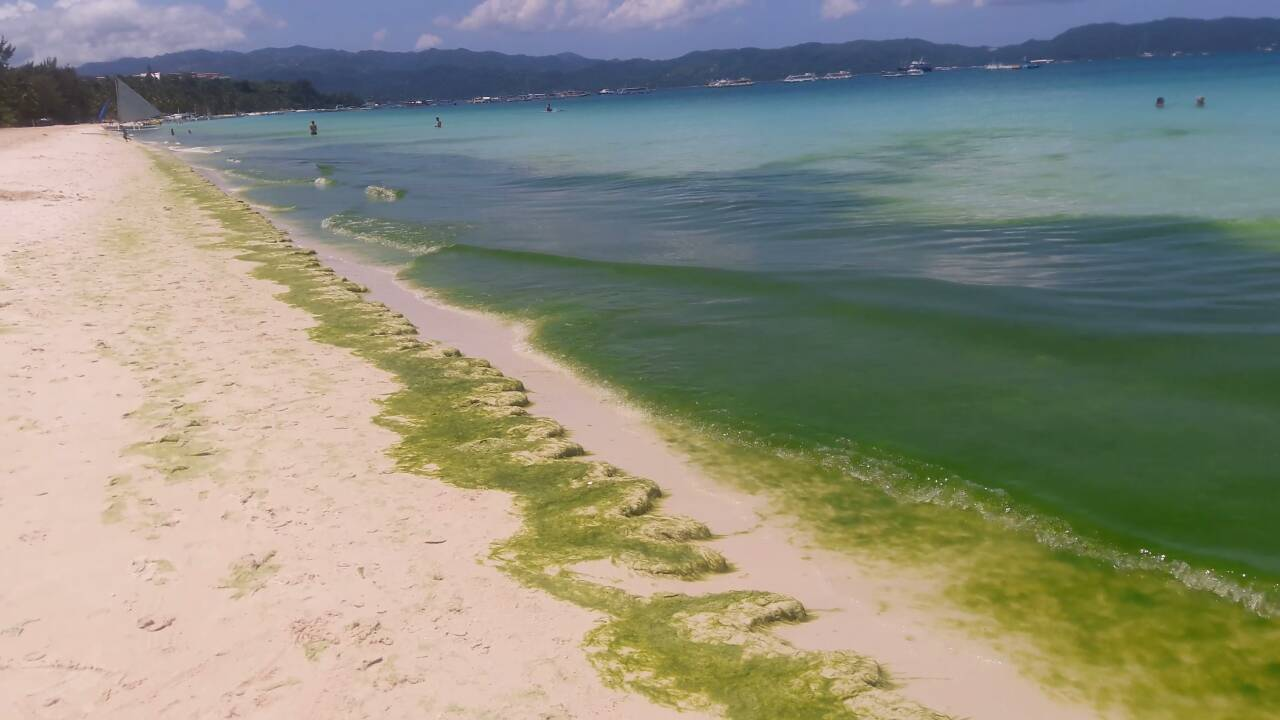
Algal bloom in Boracay on April 25, 2018, a day prior to the island's closure

After incidences of pollution in Boracay island, the country's most popular tourism destination, peaked in January 2018, Duterte in April that year ordered a six-month closure of the island to address the dumping of raw sewage in its waters. The closure began on April 26. Duterte created the Boracay Inter-Agency Task Force (BIATF) to administer the cleanup and later issued an executive order extending the BIATF's term until the end of his presidency to ensure the completion of the cleanup plan. The Duterte administration set a limit of 6,000 visitors per day, based on the island's capacity, following Boracay's reopening to the public on October 26, 2018.

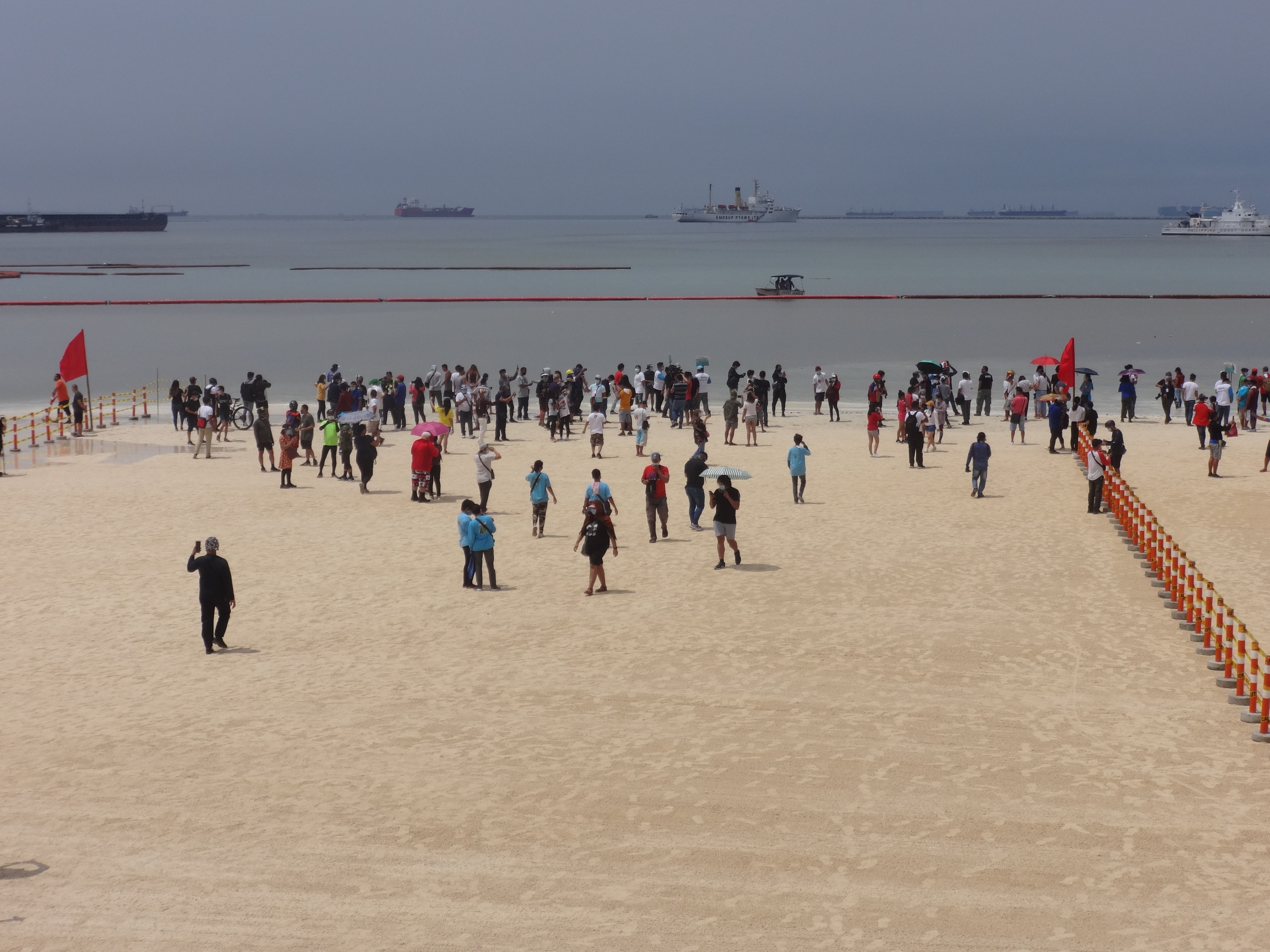
Manila Bay Beach during its temporary opening on September 19, 2020

Following the Boracay cleanup, in early 2019, Duterte directed DENR and DILG secretaries Cimatu and Año to initiate the cleanup of Manila Bay, threatening to shut down hotels along the bay if they did not install water treatment systems. Shortly after the cleanup started on January 27, Duterte created the Manila Bay Task Force to hasten the cleanup task. As part of the bay's rehabilitation, in September 2020, the DENR began overlaying crushed dolomite rock on a portion of Manila Bay to create an artificial beach; the move drew criticism from environmental advocates and the opposition but support from the general public. Coliform levels in several parts of the bay significantly declined since the cleanup.

Amid imminent land reclamation projects in Manila Bay in February 2019, Duterte signed an executive order transferring the power to approve reclamation projects from the National Economic and Development Authority to the Philippine Reclamation Authority, which he placed under the Office of the President. Favoring government-related reclamation projects in the bay, he rejected private-sector proposals, citing the damage they would cause to the city. Toward the end of his presidency, he ordered the DENR to stop the processing of applications for all reclamation projects in the country, saying massive land-reclamation proposals are "nothing but a breeding ground for corruption".

=== Health ===
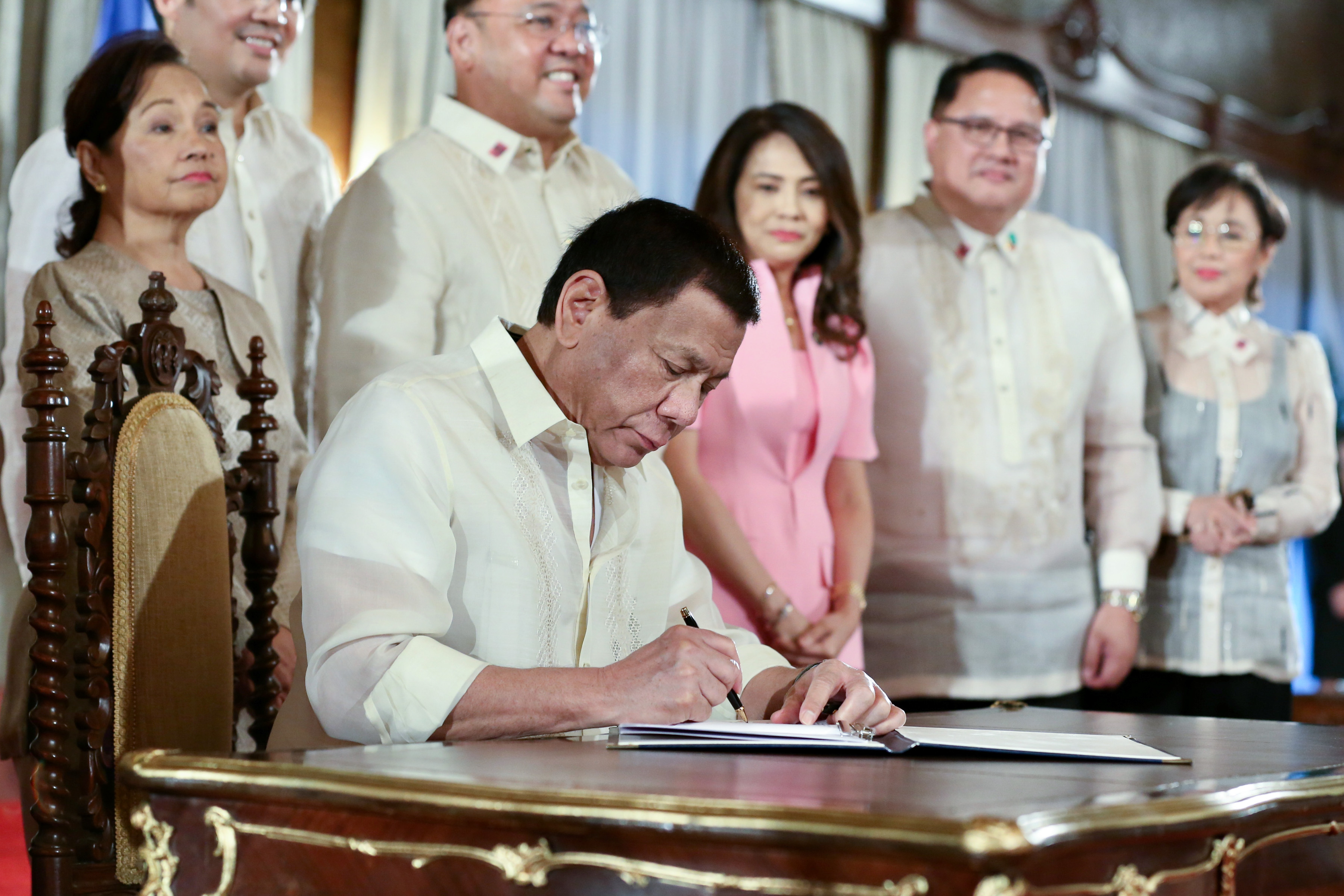
Duterte signs the Universal Health Care Act at the Malacañang Palace on February 20, 2019.

After promising to improve the country's health care system, Duterte signed laws such as the Universal Health Care Act in February 2019, which facilitated the automatic enrollment of all Filipinos under the government's health insurance program. The Philippine Mental Health Law established a national policy to improve mental health services in the country and protect the rights of persons using psychiatric, neurologic, and psycho-social health services. HIV and AIDS health services were made more accessible through a law enacted in December 2018. A law signed in December 2019 institutionalized the Malasakit Center, a "one-stop shop" for health concerns, in all hospitals run by the DOH; a total of 151 centers have been established by May 2022. Smoking in public places was banned, and the use of firecrackers and pyrotechnics was regulated through executive orders issued by Duterte.

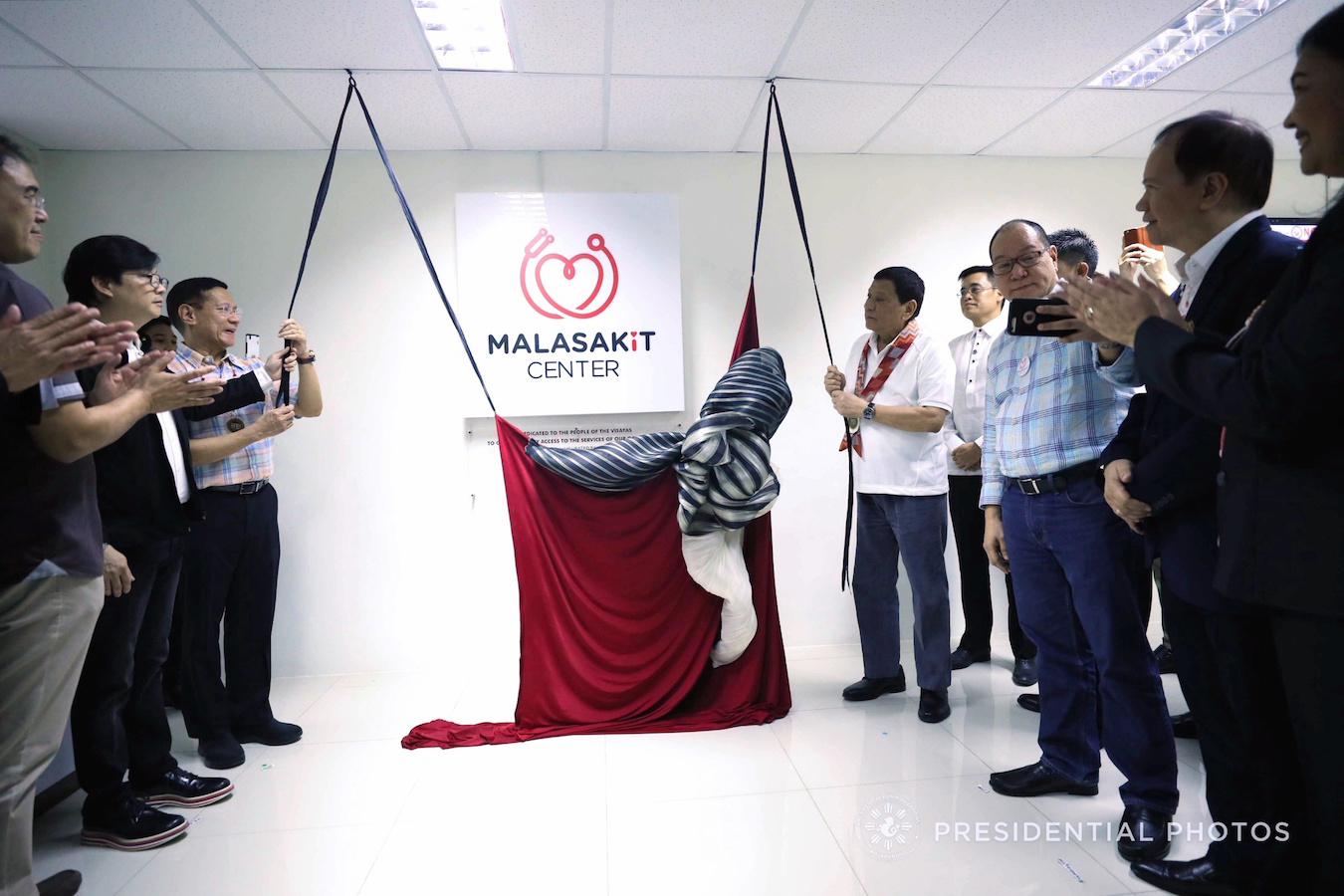
Duterte and DOH Secretary Francisco Duque III inaugurate the Malasakit Center at the VSMMC in Cebu City on February 12, 2018

Duterte signed a law establishing a national feeding program for undernourished children in all public schools. He expanded health and nutrition services for pregnant women and all infants during their first 1,000 days. An executive order signed by Duterte created an inter-agency task force to formulate a National Food Policy that included a plan to eliminate hunger.

In 2017, Duterte launched a ₱1 billion medical program to provide free medicines, prostheses, assistive devices, radiology, and chemotherapy assistance to indigent citizens. It was funded under the Office of the President's socio-civic projects fund. To make medicines more affordable, Duterte ordered a price cap for select medicines; another executive order issued in December 2021 enforced stricter price regulation of drugs and medicines for the leading causes of death in the country.

==== COVID-19 pandemic ====
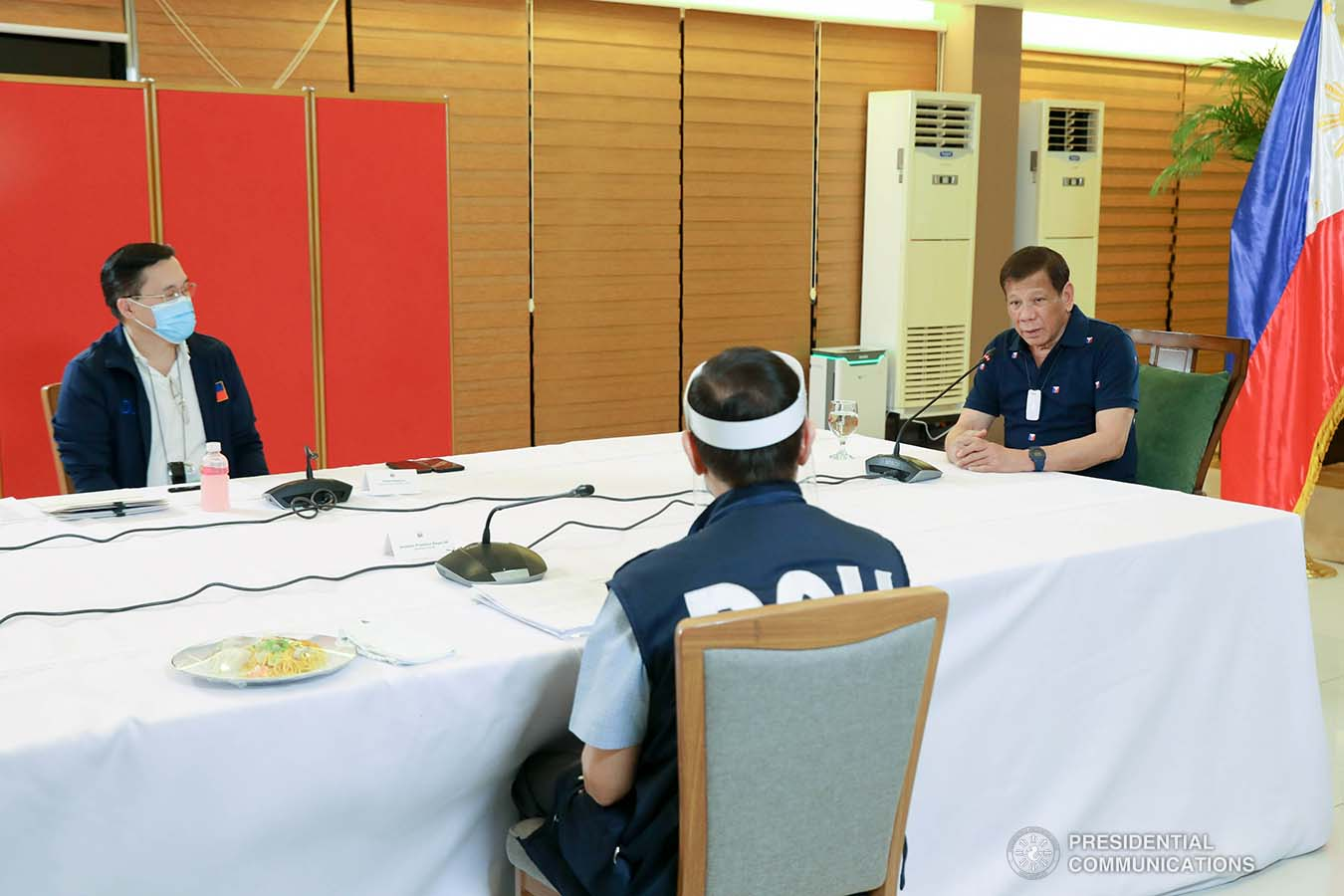
Duterte (right) during a meeting with IATF-EID members at the Matina Enclaves in Davao City on June 4, 2020.

Following the first confirmed case of "novel coronavirus 2019" in the Philippines, on January 31, 2020, Duterte ordered a temporary ban on the entry of Chinese nationals from China's Hubei province, and in February, he expanded the ban to the whole of China. On March 8, he declared a State of Public Health Emergency throughout the country due to COVID-19; four days later, he ordered a lockdown in Metro Manila. On March 16, he declared a State of National Calamity for the next six months; a day later, he placed Luzon under Enhanced Community Quarantine, resulting in the temporary closure of borders and the suspension of work and public transport. On March 24, Congress passed the Bayanihan to Heal as One Act (Bayanihan 1), which Duterte signed the following day; under the law, the President was granted the authority to realign the 2020 national budget to address the COVID-19 crisis and to temporarily direct the operations of private establishments such as private hospitals, hotels, and public transport.

The administration purchased and distributed medical equipment and supplies. On March 30, 2020, the DOH purchased one million items of personal protective equipment (PPE) worth ₱1.8 billion for COVID-19 health workers, prompting the Senate to call for a probe on overpricing. On May 20, Duterte took full responsibility for the procurement of PPE, saying he ordered health secretary Francisco Duque III to expedite the procurement of PPE regardless of cost to prevent compromising of the health workers' safety. The DTI also boosted local production of medical equipment through its Shared Service Facility Fabrication Laboratories project.

Amid a Senate investigation that was headed by Senator Richard Gordon of a scandal involving the government's purchase of alleged overpriced medical supplies from Pharmally Pharmaceutical Corp., Duterte barred Cabinet members from attending the hearings, which he called an overlong impediment to the government's pandemic response efforts. In February 2022, the Senate draft report on the investigation recommended filing charges against Pharmally and government officials involved in the transactions, including Duterte, on grounds he "betrayed public trust" when he appointed Michael Yang, who was linked to the scandal, as presidential advisor. Duterte ignored the report, saying he would not waste Filipinos' time in reacting to the Senate panel's recommendation. The seven-month-long investigation ended with the adjournment of the 18th Congress in June 2022; the report failed to reach the Senate plenary for deliberation after it was signed by nine senators out of the 11 required signatures. Senators Migz Zubiri and Sherwin Gatchalian refused to sign the report after it implicated Duterte in the scandal.

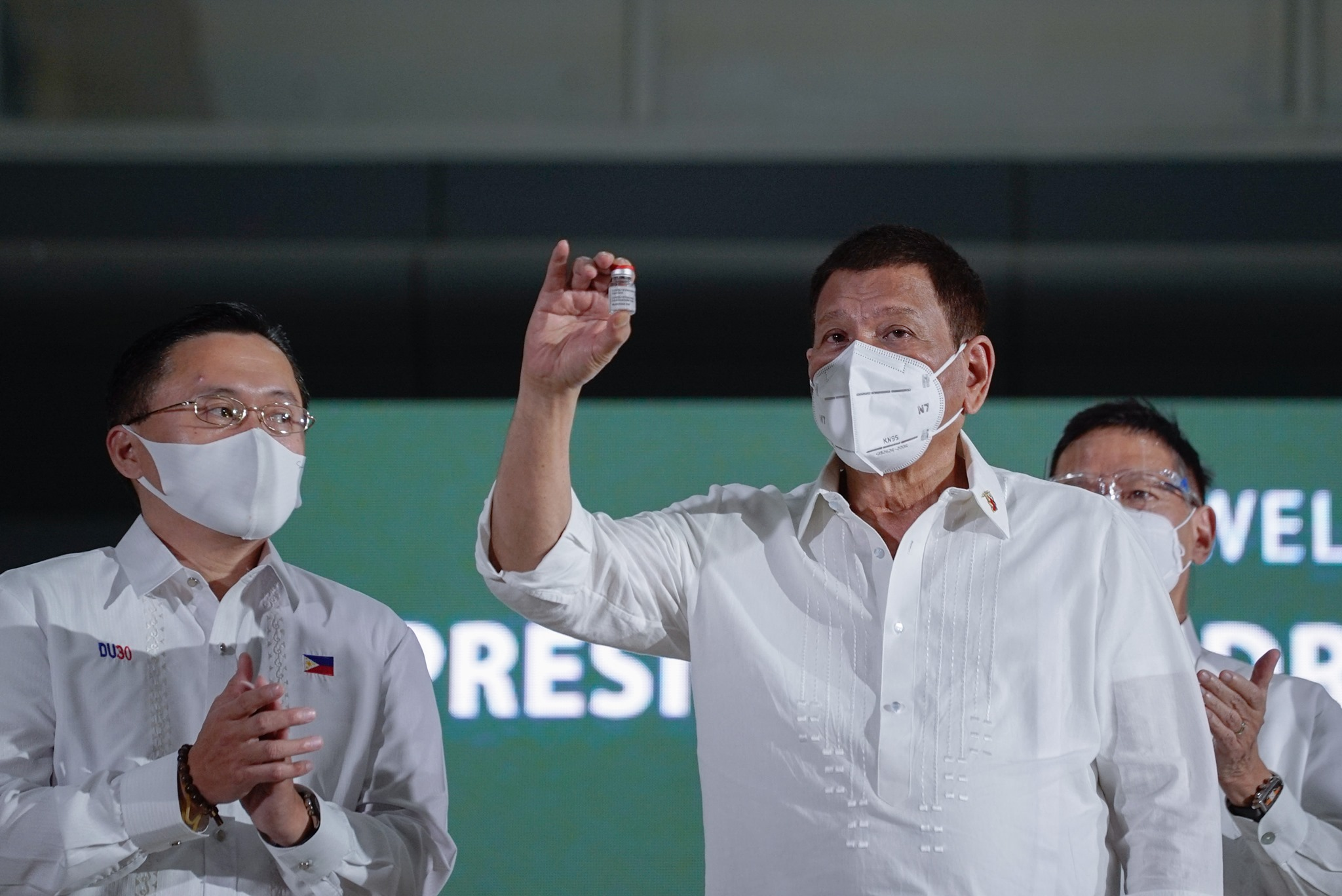
Duterte shows an AstraZeneca-developed COVID-19 vaccine vial following a ceremonial turnover in Pasay City on March 4, 2021.

The administration started its COVID-19 vaccination program on March 1, 2021, a day after the arrival of the country's first vaccine doses, which the Chinese government donated. Under the program, priority was given to medical workers, senior citizens, and persons with co-morbidities. The administration initially had a target of vaccinating 90 million Filipinos before Duterte's term ended but lowered it to between 77 million and 80 million in April 2022 due to persisting vaccine hesitancy. By early June 2022, over 245 million vaccine doses had been secured by the administration, of which 151.2 million had been administered. By the end of Duterte's term in office, 70.5 million people had been fully vaccinated; over 3.7 million COVID-19 cases in the country had been recorded during his presidency since the onset of the pandemic in 2020, with over 3.69 million recoveries and 8,706 (0.23%) active cases.

=== Housing and urban development ===
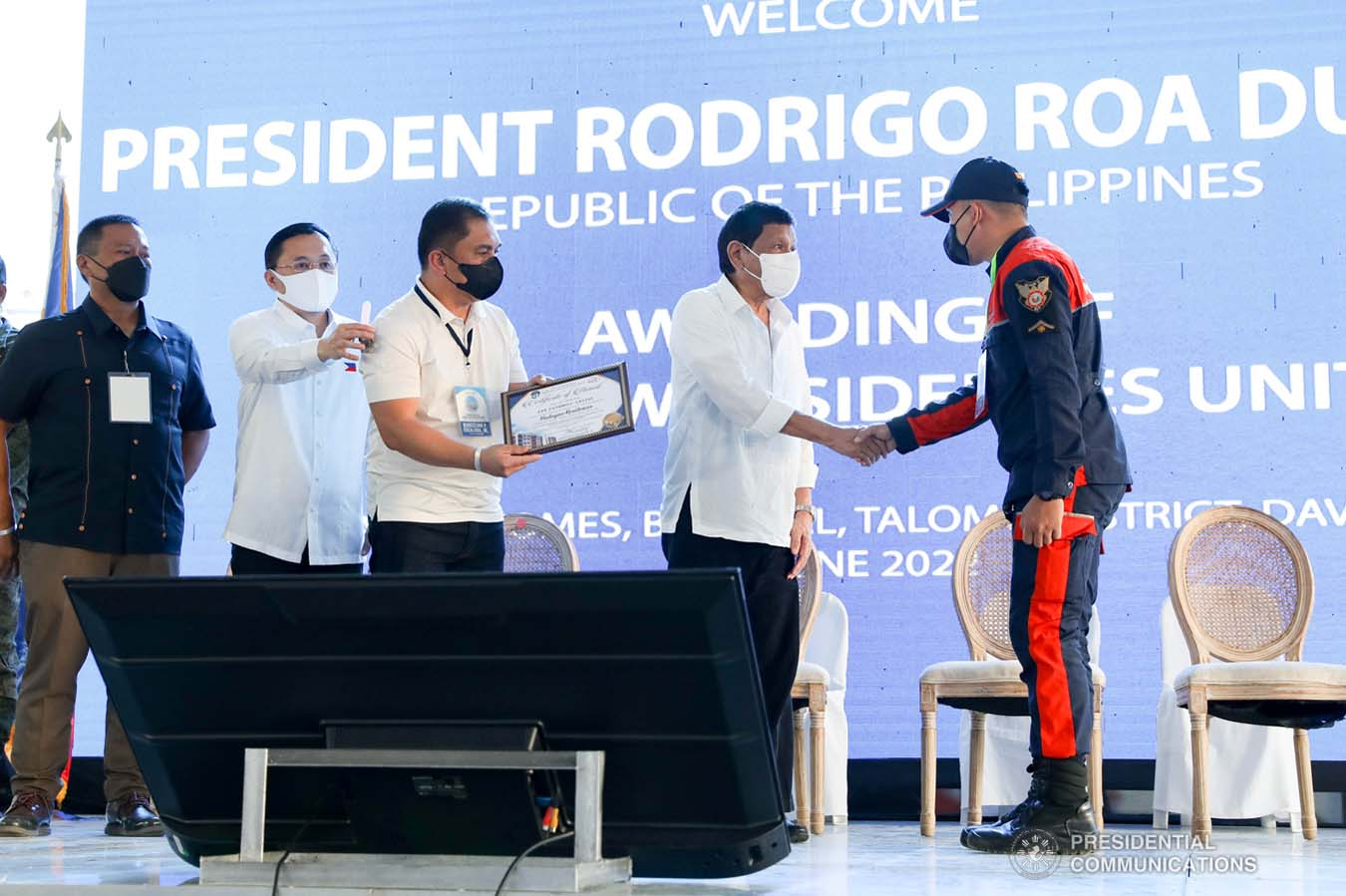
Duterte hands over the certificate of award to one of the 640 beneficiaries of Madayaw Residences units at Kadayawan Homes in Davao City on June 24, 2022.

In February 2019, Duterte merged the Housing and Urban Development Coordinating Council and the Housing and Land Use Regulatory Board to create the Department of Human Settlements and Urban Development (DHSUD), which was tasked with centralizing processing of housing documents at one-stop shops. The DHSUD reported in October 2021 the Duterte administration financed and built 1,076,277 housing units from 2016 to 2021, the highest yearly output average of housing units per year since 1975.

On March 8, 2017, an estimated 12,000 people led by members of militant urban-poor group Kalipunan ng Damayang Mahihirap (Kadamay) illegally occupied about 5,000 housing units in government housing projects in Pandi, Bulacan. These projects were intended for National Housing Authority (NHA) beneficiaries, informal settlers displaced from danger zones in Metro Manila, and uniformed personnel. Duterte initially said he would not tolerate the illegal occupation, which he described as anarchy, and that the issue should be resolved through communication. The NHA issued eviction notices but failed to evict the occupants from the housing units, prompting Duterte to permit the illegal dwellers to continue occupying the units if they did not unhouse military and police officers in the process. In June 2018, after Kadamay members attempted to occupy another housing project in Rizal, Duterte ordered the Philippine National Police to prevent the takeover.

In March 2022, the government started its first housing project for indigenous peoples.

=== Labor ===
==== Effort vs. contractualization ====
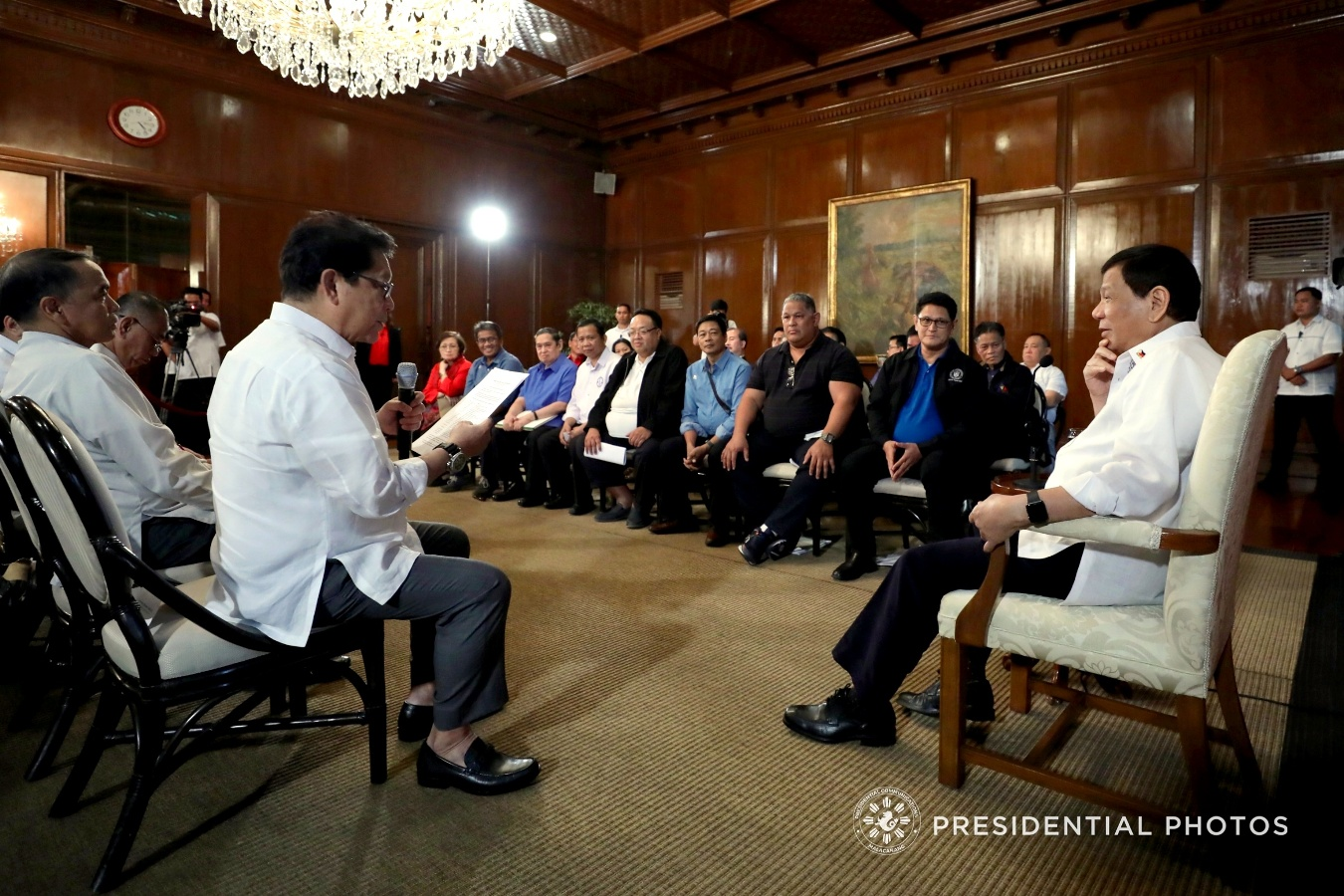
Duterte (right) convenes with government and non-government stakeholders from the labor sector at the Malacañang Palace on February 7, 2018.

Duterte campaigned to phase out contractualization (locally known as "endo", derived from "end of contract") and improve labor policies in the Philippines. In 2017, he and Department of Labor and Employment secretary Silvestre Bello III proposed a new policy to end labor-only contractualization but Bello declined to sign it, seeking input from labor groups. On March 16, Bello signed Department Order 174, which sets stricter guidelines on endo without outlawing it. Duterte continued his stand against the practice, promising to sign an executive order against it; however, terrorist attacks perpetuated by the Maute group in Marawi City delayed the signing. Labor groups organized a rally on March 15, 2018, in protest against the president's postponement. On May 1, Duterte signed Executive Order No. 51, prohibiting illegal contracting and subcontracting; labor groups expressed dissatisfaction because the terms of the agreement had changed since negotiation. Malacañang said it was powerless to enforce the ban and that lawmakers would have to amend the Labor Code of the Philippines for endo to be abolished.

On September 21, 2018, Duterte certified a Senate bill prohibiting labor-only contracting that was stated to benefit over 40 million workers. Several business groups urged Duterte to veto the bill, which they said was redundant and would force businesses to adopt automation and artificial intelligence, and that the bill violated the constitutional rights of businesses. In July 2019, Duterte vetoed the Security of Tenure Bill, which he said broadened the scope and definition of illegal "labor-only contracting", and prohibited legitimate forms of contractualization favorable to employees; he added "our goal, however, has always been to target the abuse, while leaving businesses free to engage in those practices beneficial to both management and the workforce". Employers welcomed the decision but some labor groups criticized it as a failure to deliver a campaign promise. The Trade Union Congress of the Philippines blamed business groups for using "scare tactics" of impending disinvestment if the bill was to pass.

In November 2019, the labor department reported employers had regularized over 564,000 contractual workers as part of the administration's effort to end contractualization.

==== Support for migrant workers ====
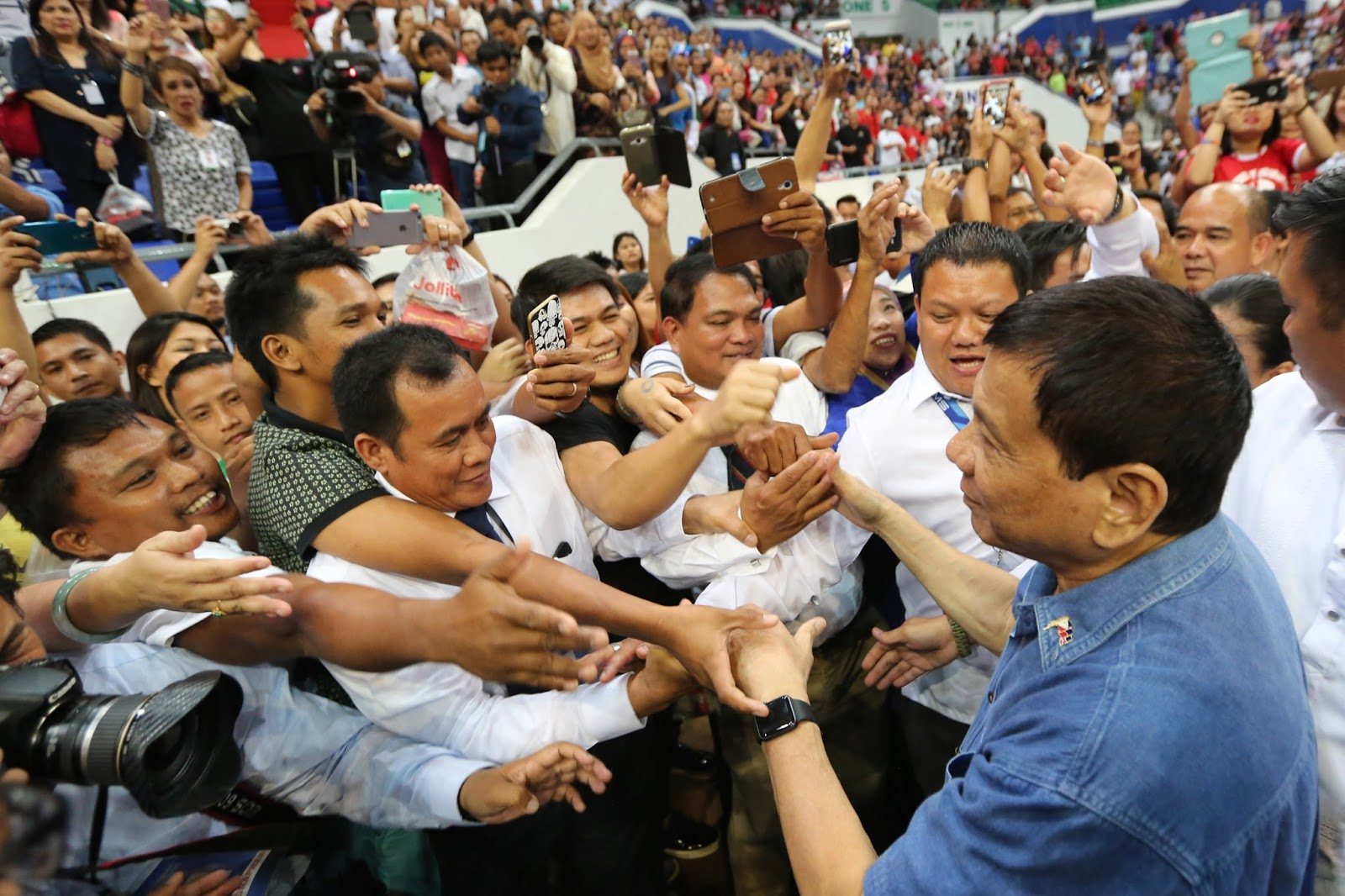
Duterte shakes hands with overseas Filipinos in Brunei on October 16, 2016

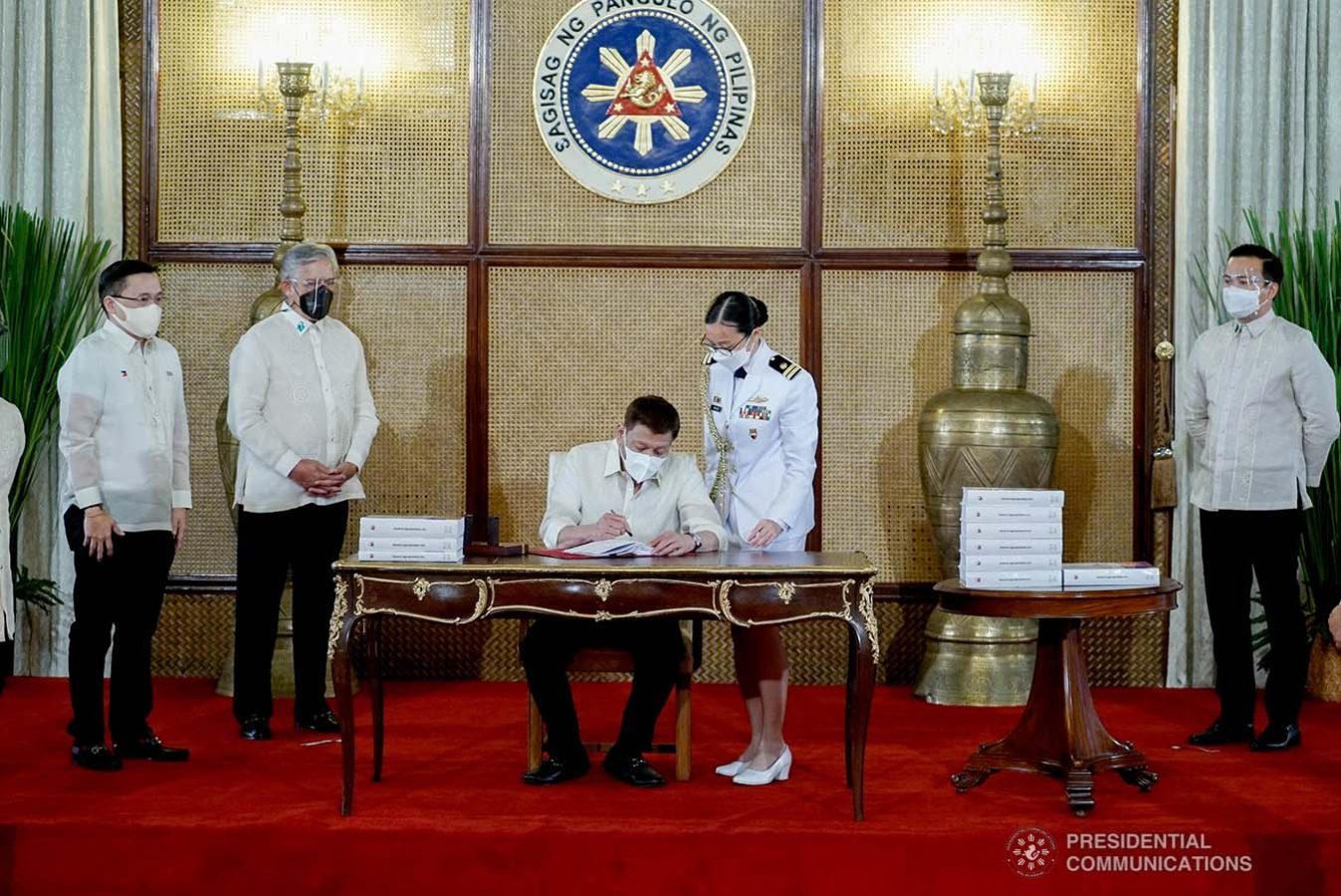
Duterte signs the bill creating the Department of Migrant Workers at the Malacañang Palace on December 30, 2021.

Duterte promised to prioritize the labor concerns of overseas Filipino workers (OFWs). He created the Department of Migrant Workers to improve coordination among government agencies concerned with OFW affairs, the Overseas Filipino Bank, and the Overseas Filipino Workers Hospital. In August 2017, he signed a law extending the validity of Philippine passports from five years to ten years.

Bilateral agreements increasing protections and opportunities for OFWs were reached with 26 countries, including Cambodia, Canada, China, Israel, Japan, Jordan, Kuwait, Romania, Saudi Arabia, and the United Arab Emirates.

The Duterte administration launched OFW centers, which provide centralized government front-line services for employment documents. Starting September 2016, the Philippine Overseas Employment Administration exempted OFWs returning to their jobs or same employers abroad from paying travel tax, securing overseas employment certificates, and paying the agency's processing fee. In November 2018, the Overseas Workers Welfare Administration (OWWA) launched the OFW E-Card, a new identification card allowing OFWs faster access to OWWA resources, including welfare services, scholarships, training programs, and social benefits.

Duterte called for the abolition of the exploitative kafala system affecting millions of OFWs employed in Gulf countries. Following the death of Filipina maid Joanna Demafelis, whose body was found inside a freezer in Kuwait, a dispute between the two countries occurred. Duterte issued a deployment ban to Kuwait in February 2018 and thousands of OFWs in Kuwait were repatriated. On May 11, 2018, the two countries signed the Agreement on the Employment of Domestic Workers between the Philippines and Kuwait, which recognized certain rights of OFWs employed as servants and maids in Kuwait.

On January 15, 2020, following the alleged killing of Jeanelyn Villavende in Kuwait by her employer, the Philippines approved a ban on the deployment of workers to Kuwait. The Philippines and Kuwait signed an agreement on the proposed standard employment contract for OFWs in Kuwait on February 5, 2020. The standard contract contained regulations endorsed by Duterte; these regulations allowed OFWs to keep their passports and cellphones, mandated one day off with pay, and designated working and sleeping hours for the OFWs.

Amid the COVID-19 pandemic from 2020 to 2022, the Duterte administration repatriated more than one million OFWs and provided them free COVID-19 testing, food, and accommodation in Metro Manila.

==== Salary increases and employee benefits ====
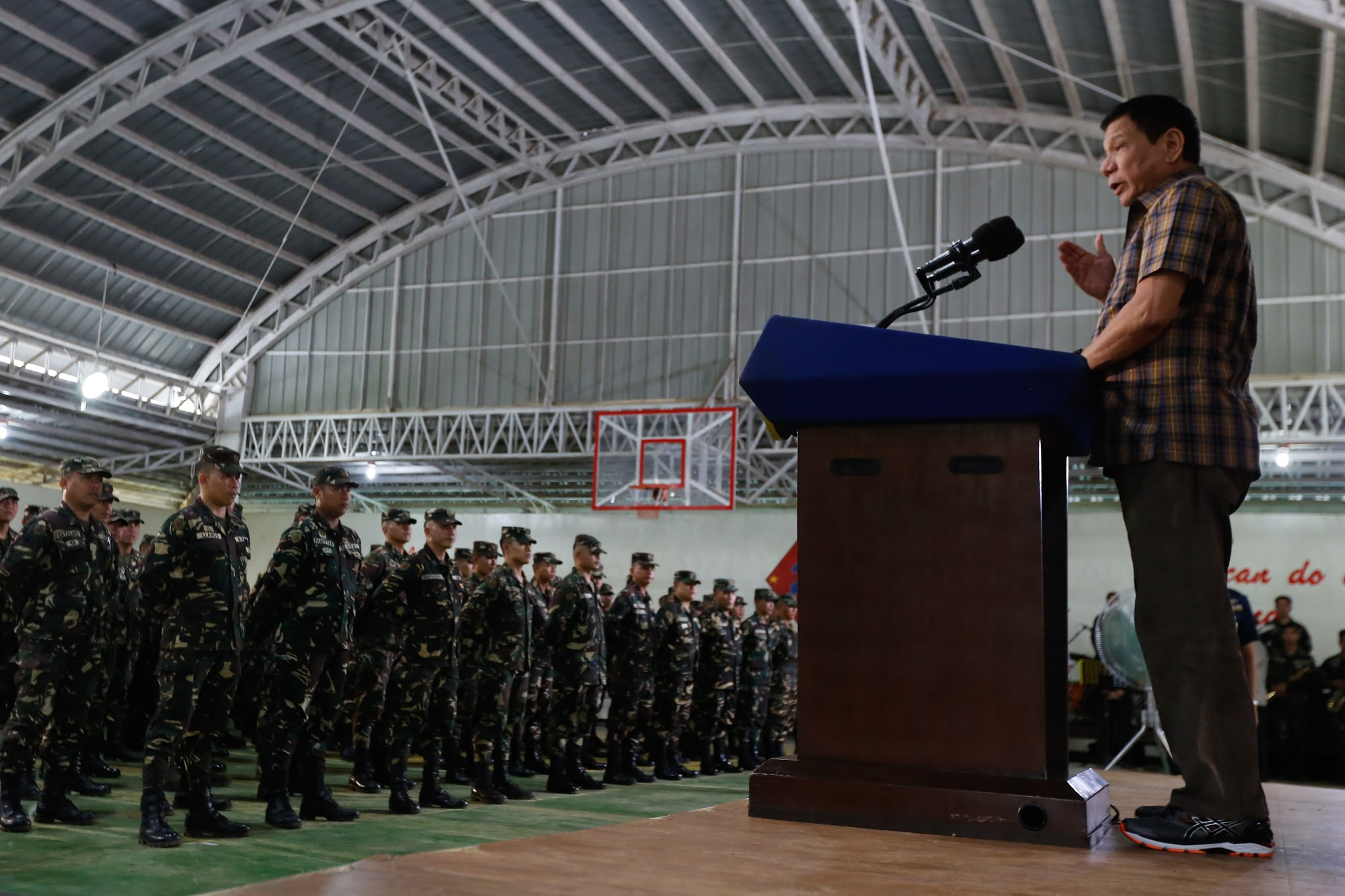
Duterte announces salary increase for soldiers and policemen at Camp Capinpin, Tanay, Rizal on August 24, 2016.

During his presidency, Duterte approved the raising of salaries of government employees, including military, police, and other uniformed personnel. Through the Salary Standardization Law of 2019, salaries of government workers, including teachers and nurses, were increased in four tranches from 2020 to 2023. A law signed in April 2022 granted a night-shift differential pay to all government employees at a rate not exceeding 20% of the hourly basic rate of the employee.

In February 2019, Duterte signed a law extending paid maternity leave for female workers from 60 days to 105 days.

=== National identification system ===
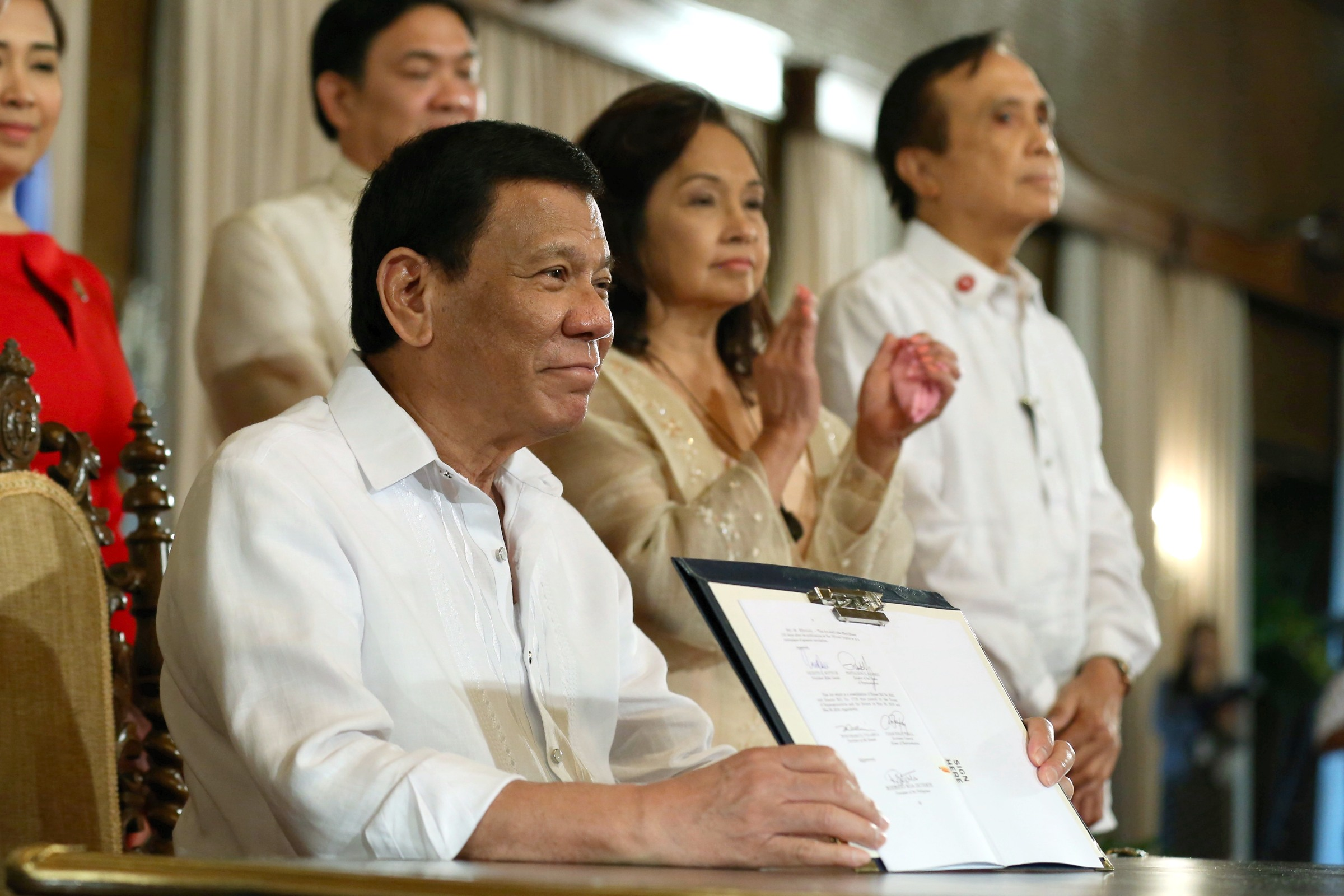
Duterte shows a copy of the PhilSys Act after signing it at Malacañang Palace on August 6, 2018.

According to Duterte, transactions would be simpler and faster through the use of a national identity system. On August 6, 2018, he signed into law the Philippine Identification System Act (PhilSys Law), seeking to integrate government IDs into a single identification card for all citizens and foreign residents in the country. On February 14, 2022, he issued an executive order institutionalizing the national ID card as sufficient proof of identity and age in all forms of transactions, eliminating the need to present additional identity documents.

The PhilSys project gained public support, but its implementation was delayed by pandemic restrictions and management issues within the Bangko Sentral ng Pilipinas. By June 2022, 66.48 million Filipinos have completed the Step 2 registration process involving validation of supporting documents and biometric captures, while the Philippine Statistics Authority delivered 11.53 million ID cards to registrants through the Philippine Postal Corporation.

=== Social issues ===
==== Land reform ====
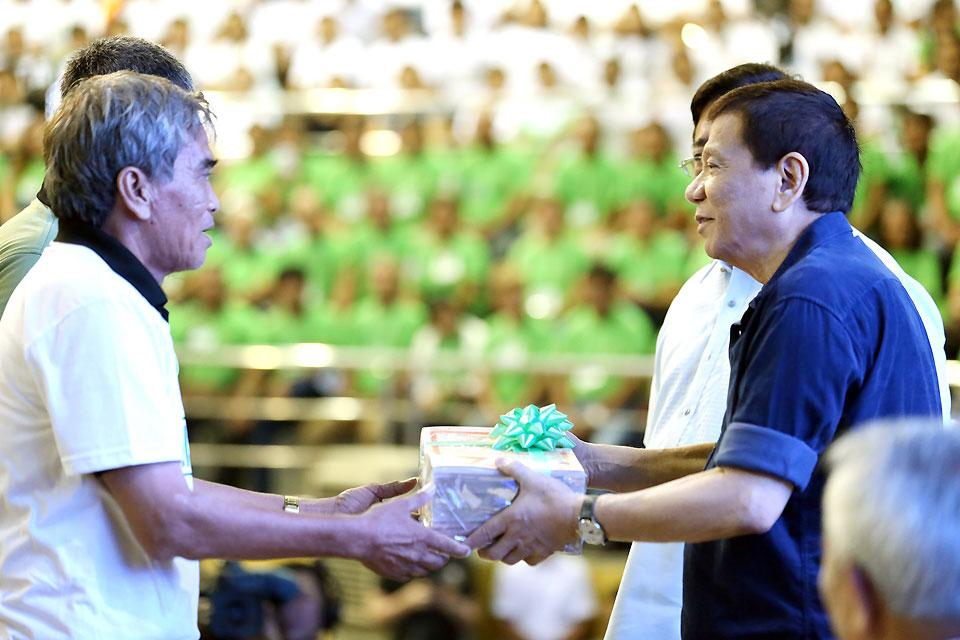
Duterte (right) distributes Certificates of Land Ownership Award (CLOAs) to Lanao del Norte beneficiaries in Cagayan de Oro on October 31, 2018.

During his presidential campaign, Duterte called the land reform program of the Aquino administration a "total failure", and promised to provide support services alongside land distribution to farmers. On July 5, 2016, a few days after Duterte's presidential inauguration, the Department of Agrarian Reform (DAR) opened the gates of its main office in Quezon City after twenty years of being barricaded shut to prevent protesters from storming it.

Following the Boracay cleanup, Duterte distributed 623 certificates of land-ownership award covering 274 hectares (680 acres) of land in Boracay and Aklan to the area's Ati inhabitants and other beneficiaries. In February 2019, Duterte ordered all government agencies to identify government-owned land that could be distributed to agrarian-reform beneficiaries.

By August 2021, under the Duterte administration, the DAR had distributed 516,000 hectares (1,280,000 acres) of land among 405,800 farmers.

==== Poverty alleviation ====
The Duterte administration has sought to lift six million Filipinos out of poverty. Duterte issued his first executive order directing the cabinet secretary to supervise 12 government agencies under the Office of the President to evaluate and reform existing poverty reduction programs. On October 5, 2016, he signed his fifth executive order, adopting Ambisyon Natin 2040 as the 25-year economic development plan for the Philippines with the aim of making the Philippines "a prosperous, predominantly middle-class society where no one is poor" by 2040.

In April 2019, Duterte enacted three anti-poverty laws; the Magna Carta of the Poor, which aimed to increase the quality of life of poor Filipinos; the Pantawid Pamilyang Pilipino Program (4Ps) Act, which institutionalized a program providing conditional cash transfer to poor households for up to seven years; and the Community-based Monitoring System Act, which adopted a community-based monitoring system in every city and municipality to improve poverty analysis.

In December 2019, the Philippine Statistics Authority reported nearly six million Filipinos were no longer in poverty as the government raised its spending on social welfare; a poverty incidence of 23.3% in 2015 had dropped to 16.6% in 2018. Administration efforts to further lower the poverty rate by the end of 2022 were hampered by the COVID-19 pandemic, prompting quarantine measures and leading to an increase in unemployment. During this time, the number of impoverished Filipinos rose from 22.26 million in 2019 to 26.14 million in early 2021. In June 2020, the administration began to ease lockdown to encourage economic activity, and address hunger and unemployment, distributing cash aid to millions of poor and low-income families during the lockdowns.

On May 21, 2021, Duterte signed a law extending the electricity lifeline rates for the poor for 50 years.

==== Family planning and child welfare ====
As part of its 10-point socioeconomic agenda, the Duterte administration strengthened the 2012 Reproductive Health Law which had not yet been implemented due to a temporary restraining order issued by the Supreme Court. On January 9, 2017, Duterte signed an executive order providing funds and support for modern family planning, and ordered the full implementation of the law.

Duterte enacted several laws protecting minors from abuse and exploitation. He signed laws that criminalized child marriage, raised the age of sexual consent from 12 to 16, and required the government to provide special protection to children in armed conflict. In September 2019, he issued an executive order creating the National Council Against Child Labor. He signed a law in May 2022 promoting the rights of abandoned children with unknown parents and recognizing them as natural-born Filipino citizens.

Duterte rejected abortion and suggested birth-control pills to prevent pregnancy. In January 2022, he signed a law simplifying the country's adoption process and establishing the National Authority for Child Care.

==== Gambling policy ====
Republic Act No. 11590 signed by Duterte on September 22, 2021, imposed additional taxes on POGOs.

Duterte has expressed disdain for gambling. Early in his term, he announced his intention to stop all online gambling operations in the country. In January 2018, he ordered the Philippine Amusement and Gaming Corporation (PAGCOR) to stop accepting new casino applications. In August that year, he dismissed the entire board of the Nayong Pilipino Foundation (NPF) for approving an onerous casino deal, ordering the Department of Justice to review the contract between the NPF and Chinese casino operator Landing Resorts Philippines Development Corp.; Duterte said the contract was disadvantageous to the government due to its low rental payments and lengthy lease.

Duterte declined China's request to ban Philippine Offshore Gaming Operators (POGOs), which flourished during his presidency, because of the industry's contribution to the economy. During the COVID-19 pandemic, he allowed gambling operations in the country to raise COVID-19 response funds, lifting the ban on casinos he imposed in 2018 on Boracay Island following the island's cleanup and initially rejecting calls to terminate e-sabong (online cockfighting) operations amid the disappearance of more than 30 cockfight enthusiasts.

From 2016 through 2021, the PAGCOR earned ₱373.33 billion in revenues, of which ₱238.74 was remitted to the government; ₱150.16 billion was remitted to the National Treasury and was used to fund the Universal Health Care Act, while ₱360 million was remitted to the Dangerous Drugs Board.

==== Revised water concession agreements ====
In March 2019, a water shortage crisis severely affected Metro Manila, causing long queues to collect water rations. Duterte ordered the review of the 1997 water-concession agreements signed under the Ramos administration with private water companies Maynilad and Manila Water, saying the agreements were onerous to both the government and the public. That November, a Singapore-based arbitration court in November 2019 ruled the government had to pay billions of pesos to both companies as compensation for losses from rejected water-rate hikes. Duterte refused to pay and threatened to sue the two firms for economic plunder. Following the Department of Justice's discovery of 12 "onerous provisions" that favored the companies, Duterte ordered Solicitor General Jose Calida and Finance secretary Carlos Dominguez III to write a new water-concession contract favorable to the public and the government, and ordered the two firms to accept or face expropriation. The two firms agreed to waive the ₱10.8 billion refund from the government, and, in 2021, signed the revised agreement, which removed government non-interference clauses and the firms' authority to charge corporate income tax to consumers.

In January 2022, Duterte signed new franchises for Maynilad and Manila Water, allowing the firms to continue operating for another 25 years. Under the new franchise laws, the President is allowed to temporarily take over and operate the firms during a period of war, rebellion, calamity, emergency, and disaster.

==== Compensation and incentives ====
Duterte approved, in January 2017, a ₱1,000 increase in the Social Security System pension. He signed legislation raising the old-age pension for living Filipino veterans of World War II, the Korean War, and the Vietnam War; providing incentives for Filipino scientists abroad to return and share their expertise; granting tax-free compensation to Marawi Siege victims and mandatory, continued benefits to all frontline workers during public-health emergencies; granting benefits to the surviving spouse and children of deceased, retired prosecutors of the National Prosecution Service; and, strengthening the Sangguniang Kabataan and granting monthly honoraria to barangay youth-council officials. He also signed executive orders granting monetary assistance to each CAFGU Active Auxiliary unit member in recognition for their contributions in the government's fight against insurgency and terrorism.

To decongest Metro Manila and promote development in other regions, Duterte issued an executive order institutionalizing the Balik Probinsya, Bagong Pag-asa Program, which provides incentives such as transportation, cash aid, skills training, and low-cost housing to qualifying people wishing to return to their provinces. In his last month in office, he doubled the cash incentives for Filipino medalists in the 31st Southeast Asian Games, and allowed a bill granting additional benefits and coverage to solo parents to lapse into law.

=== Space ===
Republic Act No. 11363 signed by Duterte on August 8, 2019, established the Philippine Space Agency.

Recognizing the "urgent need to create a coherent and unified strategy for space development and utilization to keep up with other nations", Duterte signed a law creating the Philippine Space Agency, to serve as the central government agency addressing national issues and activities related to space, science, and technology applications.

The Department of Science and Technology, led by Secretary Fortunato de la Peña, in collaboration with Japanese institutions, launched three satellites into space under the STAMINA4Space program: the Maya-1 nanosatellite, on June 29, 2018; the Diwata-2 microsatellite, on October 29, 2018; and the Maya-2 nanosatellite, on February 21, 2021.

=== Telecommunications ===
In his fifth State of the Nation address in July 2020, Duterte warned the major telecommunications companies Globe Telecom and Smart Communications to improve their services by December or risk facing closure. Duterte urged telecommunications firms to report local officials delaying the approval of permits for cell-site construction, after the firms said red tape and non-standardized requirements made it difficult for them to build towers. In compliance with Duterte's order, the Department of the Interior and Local Government simplified the application process for the construction of shared cellular sites, shortening it to 16 days; local government units also complied with Duterte's order. Globe Telecom and Smart Communications have since improved their services. In February 2022, average fixed broadband download speeds rose from 7.91 Mbit/s to 82.61 Mbit/s, a 944% increase; average mobile internet speeds increased 467% at 42.22 Mbit/s from 7.44 Mbit/s since the start of the Duterte administration.

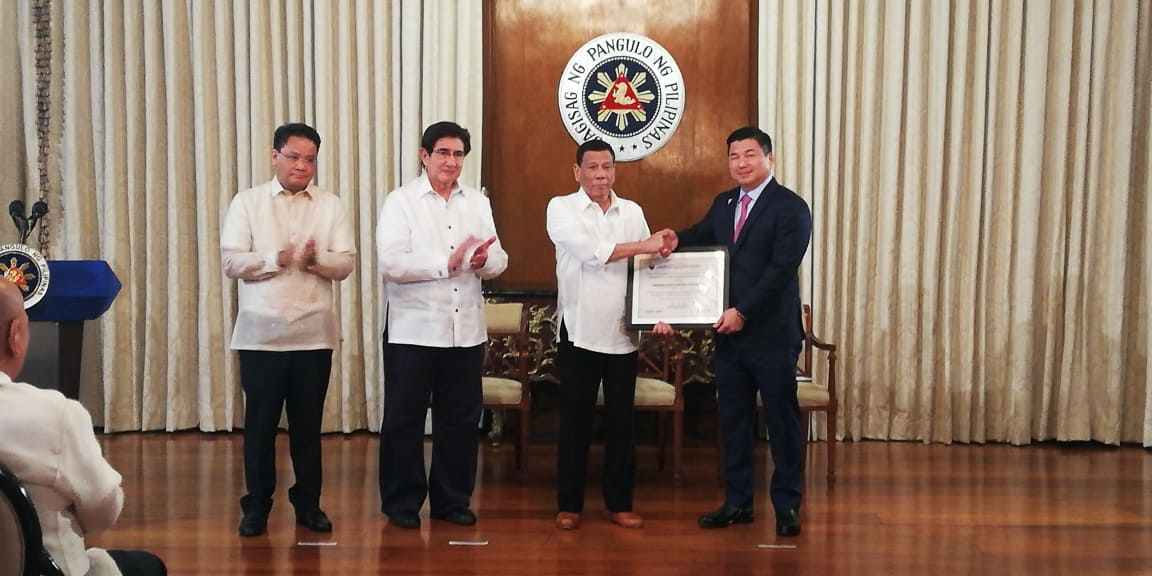
Duterte (2nd from right) leads the awarding of the Certificate of Public Convenience and Necessity to the Mislatel Consortium represented by businessman Dennis Uy (right) on July 8, 2019.

Duterte campaigned to break up the telecom duopoly of Globe and Smart due to the companies' poor mobile network services and internet speeds. Bidding was held in November 2018 to determine a third major telecommunications provider in the country; Dito Telecommunity, which was then known as Mislatel Consortium, provisionally won the bid on November 7. Duterte formally awarded the company its certificate of public convenience and necessity in July 2019. On March 9, 2021, Dito Telecommunity began commercial operations, becoming the Philippines' third telecommunications company, and soon received a 25-year franchise.

In March 2017, Duterte approved the National Broadband Program (NBP) that was developed by the Department of Information and Communications Technology (DICT). Despite a small budget, the DICT and the Bases Conversion and Development Authority completed the Luzon Bypass Infrastructure, an ultra-high-speed system for international submarine cables that avoided the earthquake-prone Luzon Strait.

Duterte and his administration were embroiled in controversy following the cessation of TV and radio broadcast operations of ABS-CBN, the largest media network in the country. Duterte expressed displeasure at the media network following its failure to air his political advertisements for which his 2016 election campaign had paid; during the same period, the network aired Senator Antonio Trillanes' advertisements, showing clips of Duterte speaking about issues of rape and murder. Duterte said he would not allow the National Telecommunications Commission (NTC) to grant ABS-CBN a permit unless the firm paid its alleged tax debt. In February 2020, a few months before its legislative franchise expired, ABS-CBN president and CEO Carlo Katigbak issued an apology to Duterte for failing to air his political advertisements, offering to return the remaining ₱2.6 million in advertisement funds. Duterte accepted the apology and declined the refund, and distanced himself from the franchise-renewal issue, saying he had no control over the House of Representatives or Solicitor General Jose Calida, who earlier filed a quo warranto petition before the Supreme Court, seeking to invalidate ABS-CBN's franchise due to an alleged violation of the 1987 Constitution regarding foreign ownership. Following the expiry of its legislative franchise on May 4, ABS-CBN ceased its broadcast operations; the following day, the NTC issued a cease-and-desist order. On July 10, the House Committee on Legislative Franchises, in a 70-to-11 vote, declined the media network's application for a new 25-year franchise, citing issues with the dual citizenship of its chairman emeritus Eugenio Lopez III, a possible violation of constitutional limits on foreign ownership, reported tax and labor violations, and allegations of biased reporting and political meddling. Opposition politicians, media groups, academic institutions, and religious leaders condemned the broadcast shutdown and the franchise-renewal denial. Calida called the cease-and-desist order "a triumph of the rule of law".

Duterte signed laws requiring the government to provide free internet access in public places and allowing mobile users to permanently keep their numbers. In March 2021, to improve internet access, he issued an executive order granting telecommunication companies access to satellite services. By March 2022, 7,977 WiFi operational sites in public areas nationwide were established under the Free WiFi for All program while the completion rate of the first phase of the NBP was at 73.5%. Shortly before Duterte's term ended, his administration swiftly approved Starlink's application to provide satellite internet access in the country to address connectivity issues in unserved or underserved areas.

=== Transportation ===
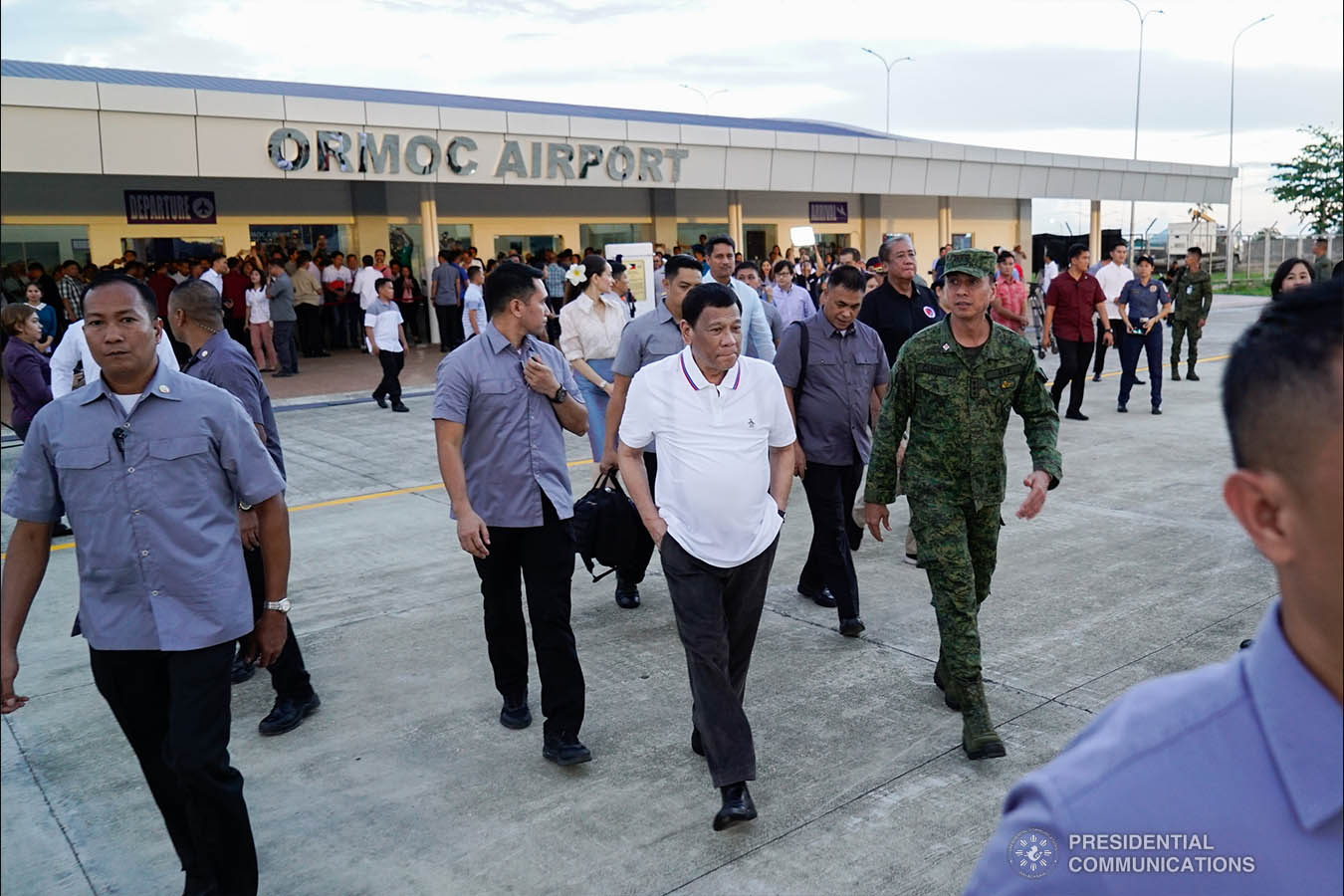
Duterte (center) leads the inauguration of the upgraded Ormoc Airport.

In June 2017, the Duterte administration launched a program to modernize the country's public transport system. The program phased out 15-year-old and older jeepneys and other public utility vehicles (PUVs), required PUVs to have at least a Euro4-compliant engine or electric engine to lessen pollution, and encouraged PUV operators with existing franchises to consolidate into a single legal group of at least 15 units. Another program launched in June 2019 provided scholarships and training to public-transport drivers.

Duterte campaigned to solve the long-standing traffic problem in Metro Manila, particularly in EDSA, but later abandoned it after a bill granting him emergency powers allowing him to bypass bidding procedures and hasten the resolution of right-of-way issues did not progress in the Senate.

In his fourth State of the Nation Address in July 2019, Duterte ordered the clearing of obstructions on public roads, instructing Department of the Interior and Local Government secretary Eduardo Año to suspend mayors and governors who failed to comply. Año gave mayors 60 days to clear illegal obstructions and illegally parked vehicles from all public roads and sidewalks. In October 2019, Año said: "based on the report from 1,246 LGUs, 6,899 roads around the country were cleared through the cooperation of the provincial, city and municipal governments"; 97 local government units failed to comply with Duterte's order and were given five days to explain their non-compliance.

The DOTr created protected bike lanes in major metropolises; by the end of Duterte's term in office, 563 km (350 mi) of bike lane networks had been completed in Metro Manila, Metro Cebu, and Metro Davao. Duterte extended the validity of driver's licenses from three years to five and granted students riding PUVs a 20% fare discount. In April 2022, he allowed a bill regulating and developing the Philippines' electric vehicle industry to lapse into law. By 2022, under Duterte's Build! Build! Build! program, 40,080 km (24,900 mi) of roads and 6,854 bridges had been constructed, maintained, or upgraded; 579 commercial and social tourism ports had been developed; and 248 airport projects were completed.

=== Other initiatives ===
==== Burial of Ferdinand Marcos ====
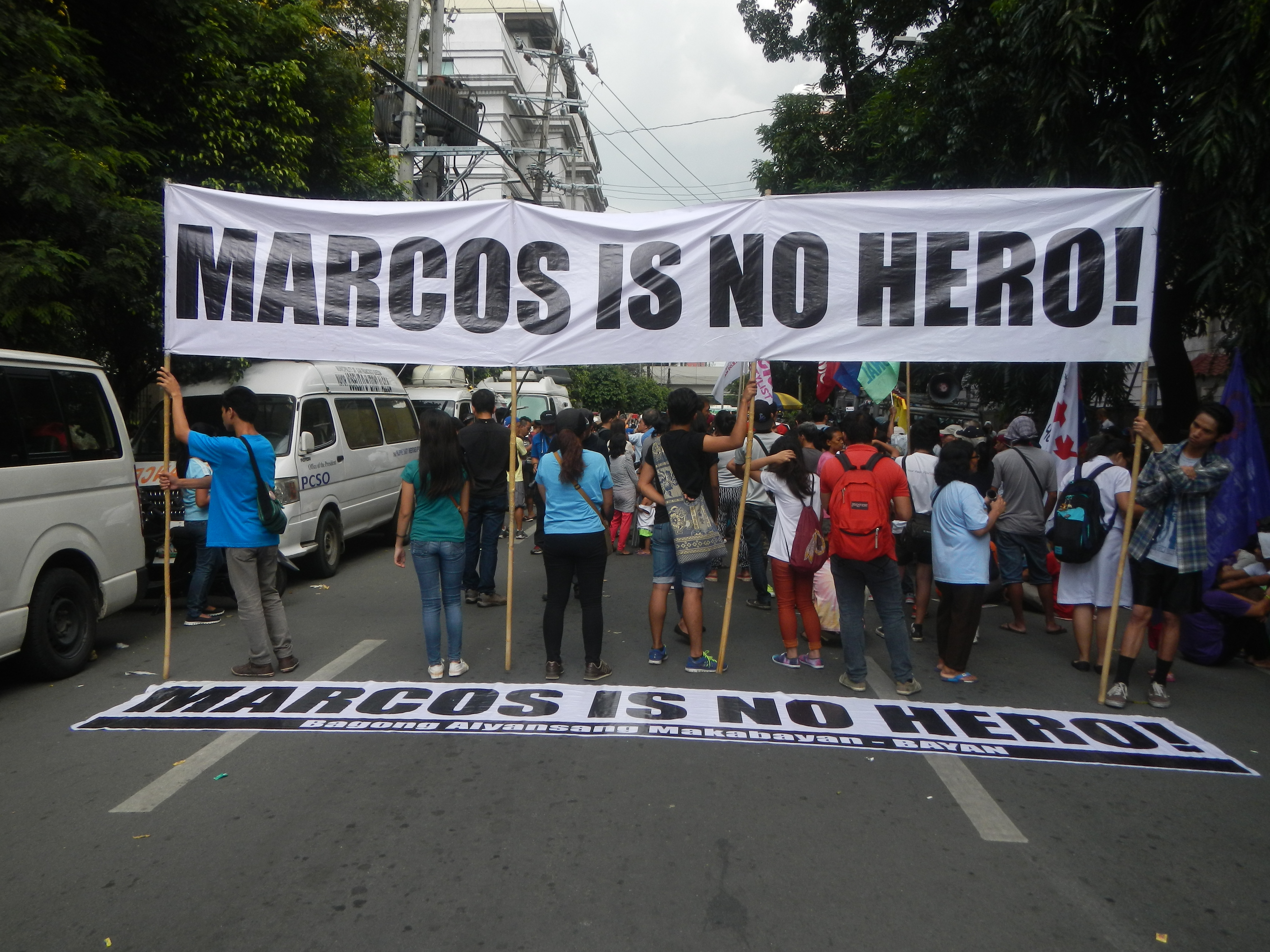
Protesters against the burial of late dictator Ferdinand Marcos at the Libingan ng mga Bayani

In 2016, Duterte said dictator Ferdinand Marcos's remains would be moved and interred at Libingan ng mga Bayani (Heroes' Cemetery), calling him a president, soldier, and hero. On November 18, 2016, Marcos was buried with full military honors at Heroes' Cemetery after the Supreme Court issued a verdict permitting it. The burial provoked national outrage, especially among those who had suffered human rights abuses under the Marcos regime; protests were continuously held from November 18 to 30. Vice President Leni Robredo criticized the burial while Duterte expressed hope people could "find space in their hearts to forgive and set free those who have hurt or injured them".

==== Administrative division changes ====
In 2017, citing the need to prioritize funds for government programs and projects, Duterte revoked the 2015 executive order issued by President Aquino III creating Negros Island Region, effectively reverting Negros Occidental and the city of Bacolod to Region VI, and Negros Oriental to Region VII. In April 2019, he signed a law dividing Palawan province into three new provinces; Palawan del Norte, Palawan del Sur, and Palawan Oriental; the law failed to gain a majority of votes in a plebiscite. A law he signed dividing Maguindanao into Maguindanao del Norte and Maguindanao del Sur provinces was ratified in a plebiscite on September 17, 2022. In April 2019, Duterte signed a law renaming Compostela Valley to Davao de Oro, a change that was overwhelmingly supported in a plebiscite.

Duterte signed a law amending the Local Government Code of 1991, easing conversion of municipalities to component cities on the conditions the municipality earns ₱100 million for two consecutive years and has either a land area of at least 100 km^{2} (39 sq mi) or a population of at least 150,000.

== Foreign affairs ==
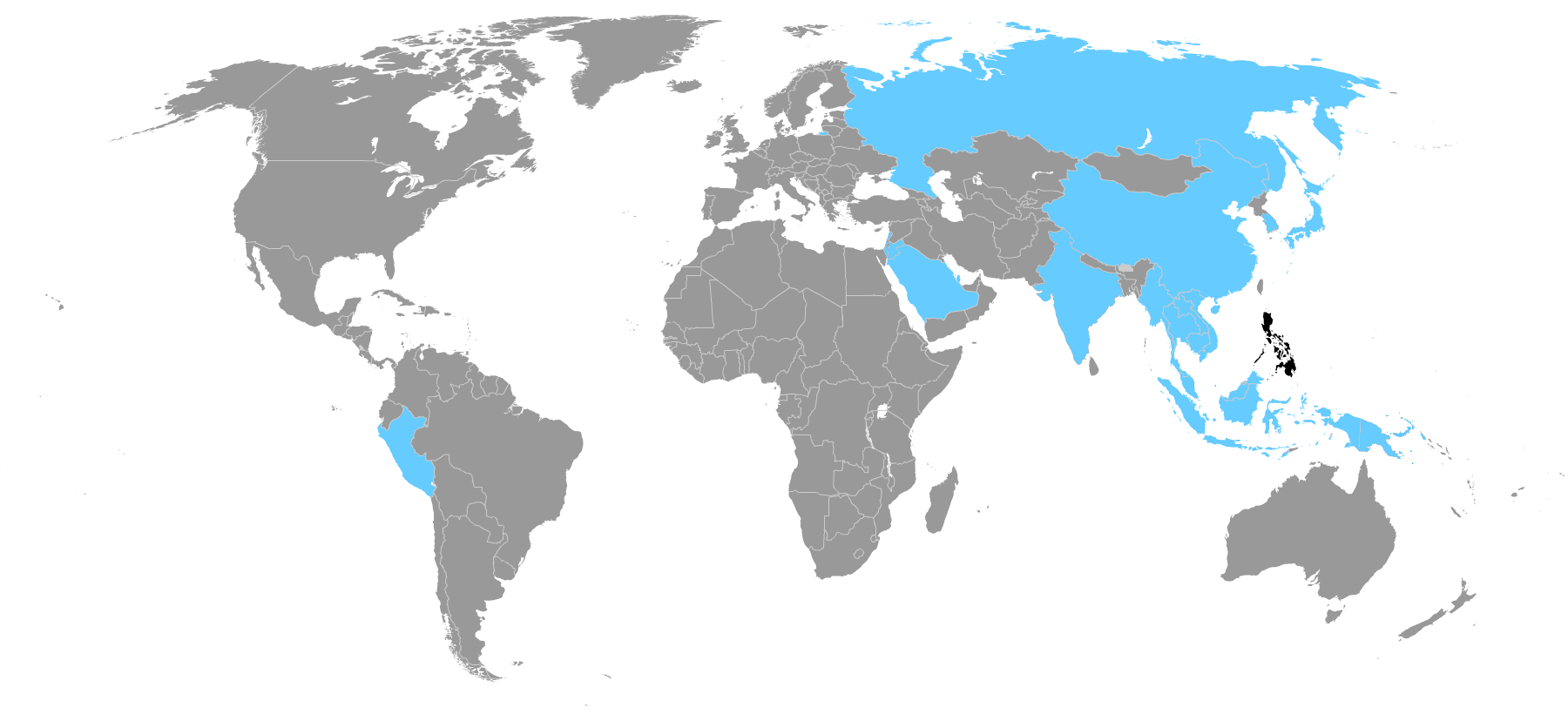
International trips made by Duterte as president

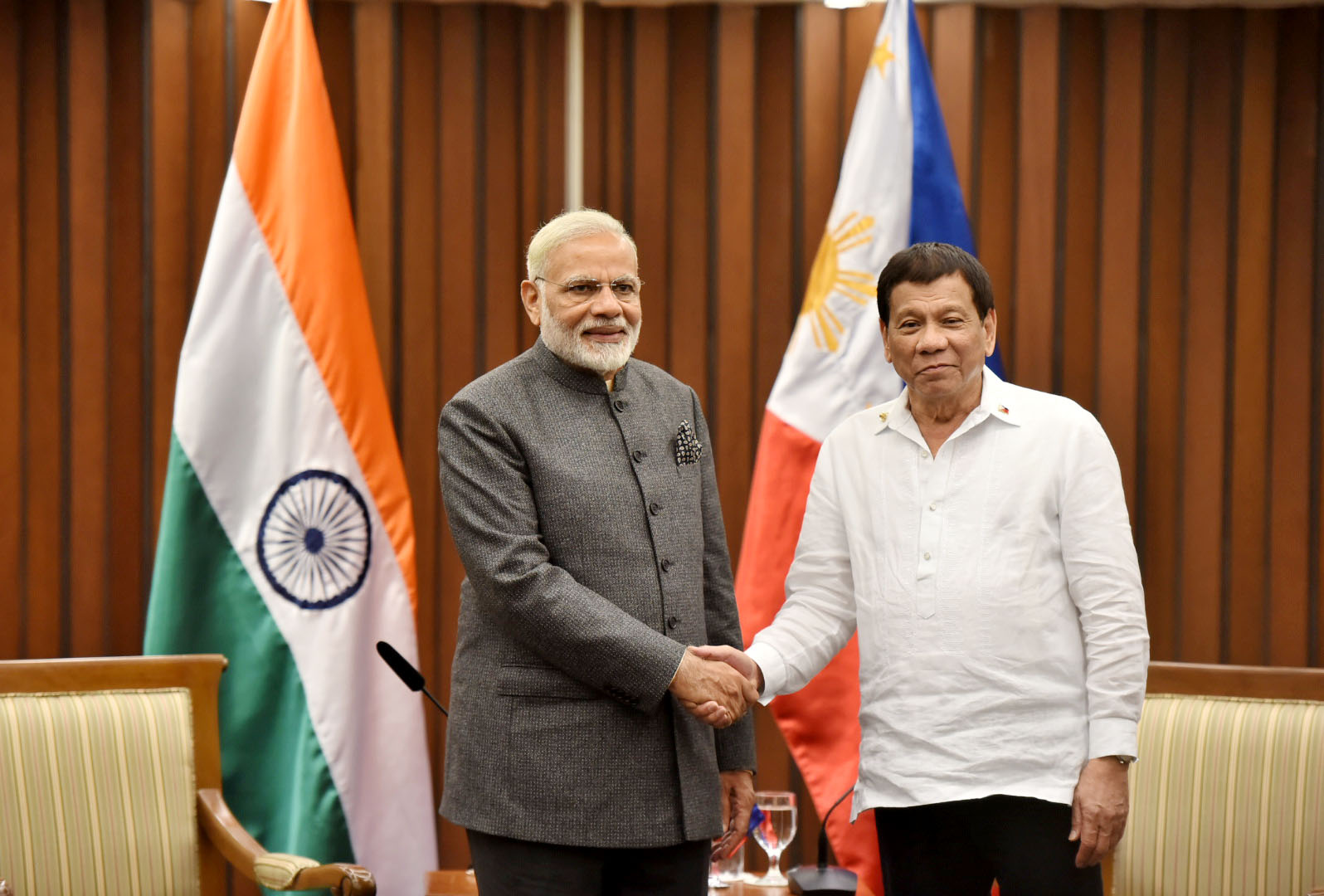
Duterte with Indian Prime Minister Narendra Modi in Manila, November 2017

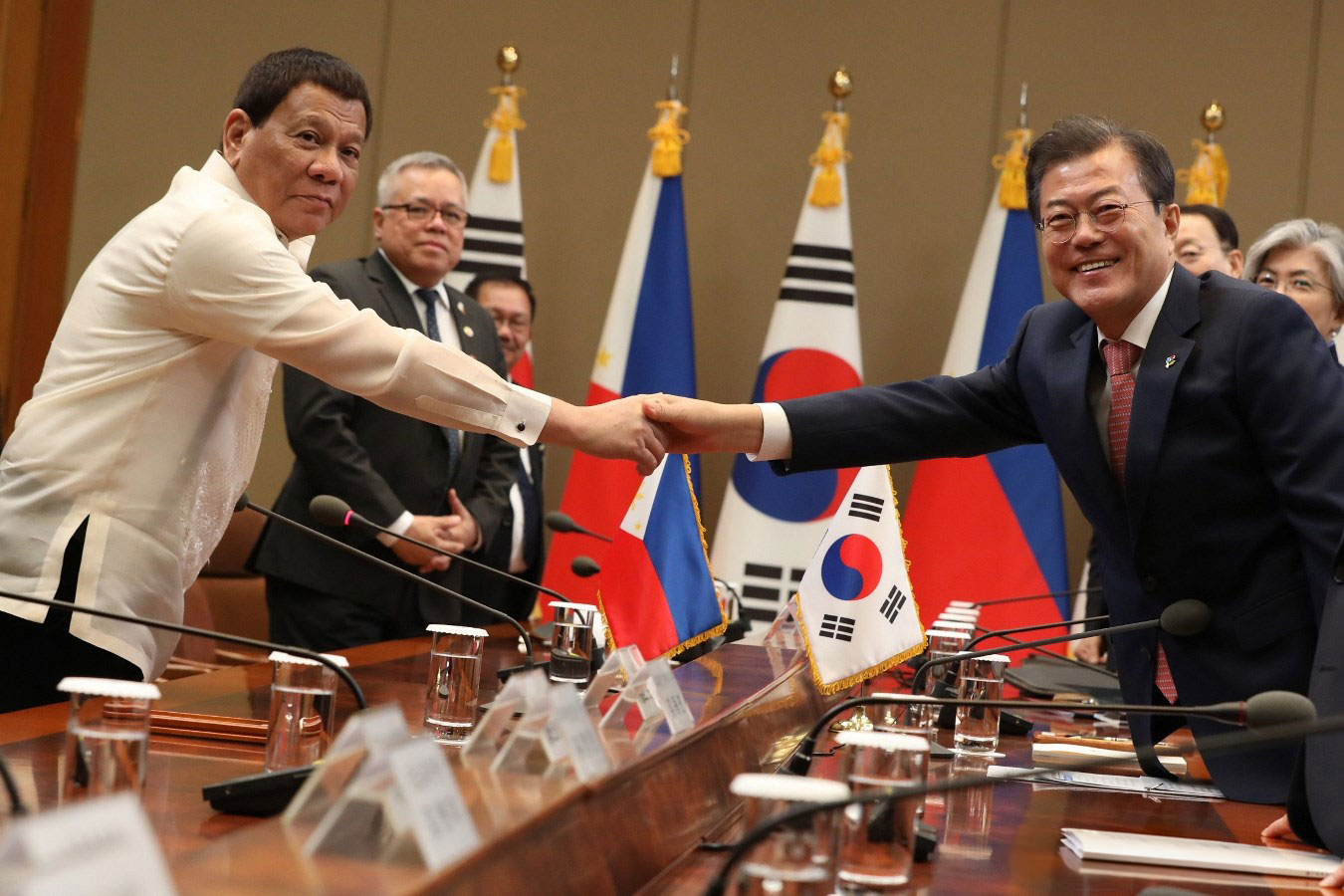
Duterte with South Korean President Moon Jae-in at the Blue House during the former's official visit to Seoul, June 2018

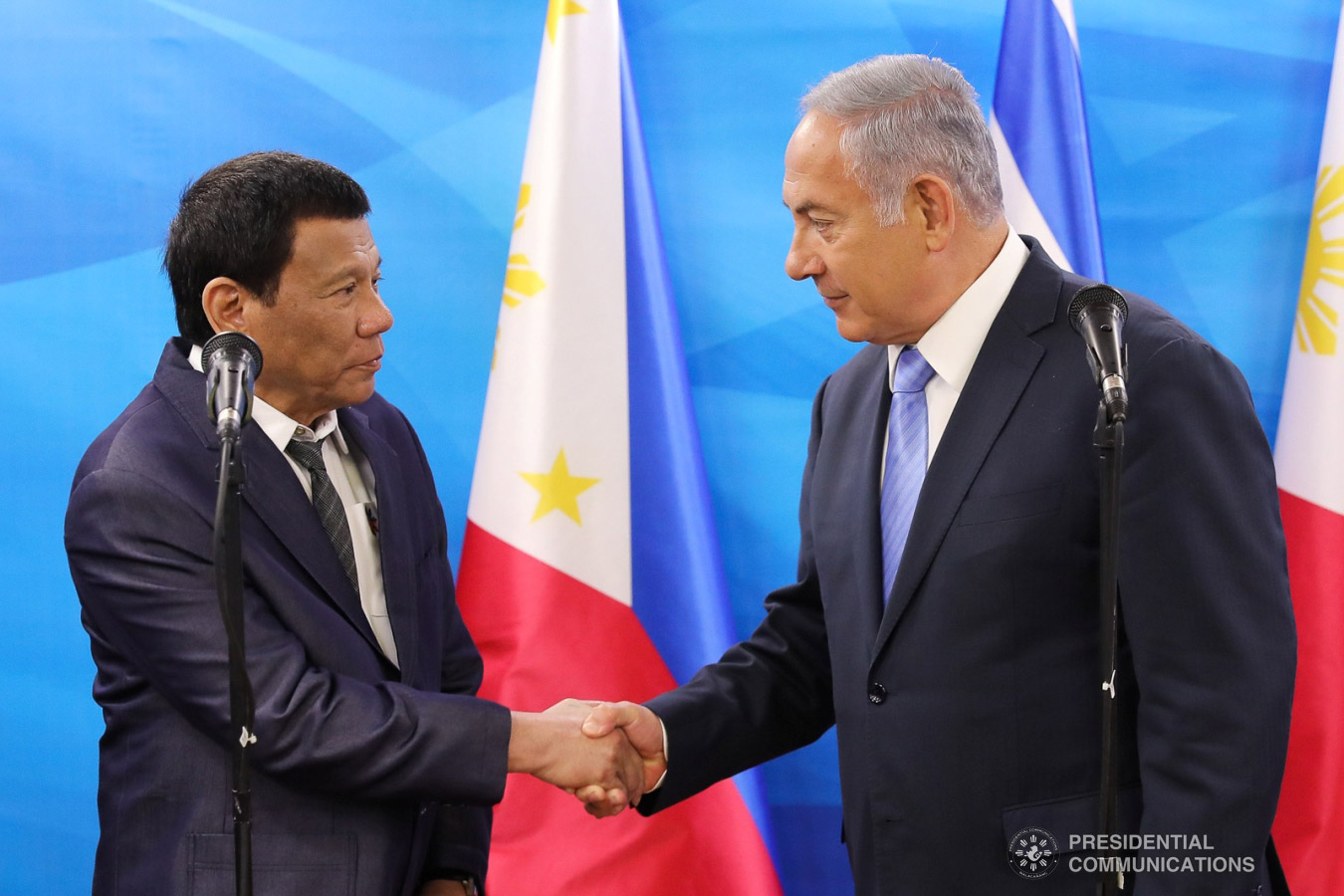
Duterte and Israeli Prime Minister Benjamin Netanyahu, during the former's state visit to Jerusalem, September 2018

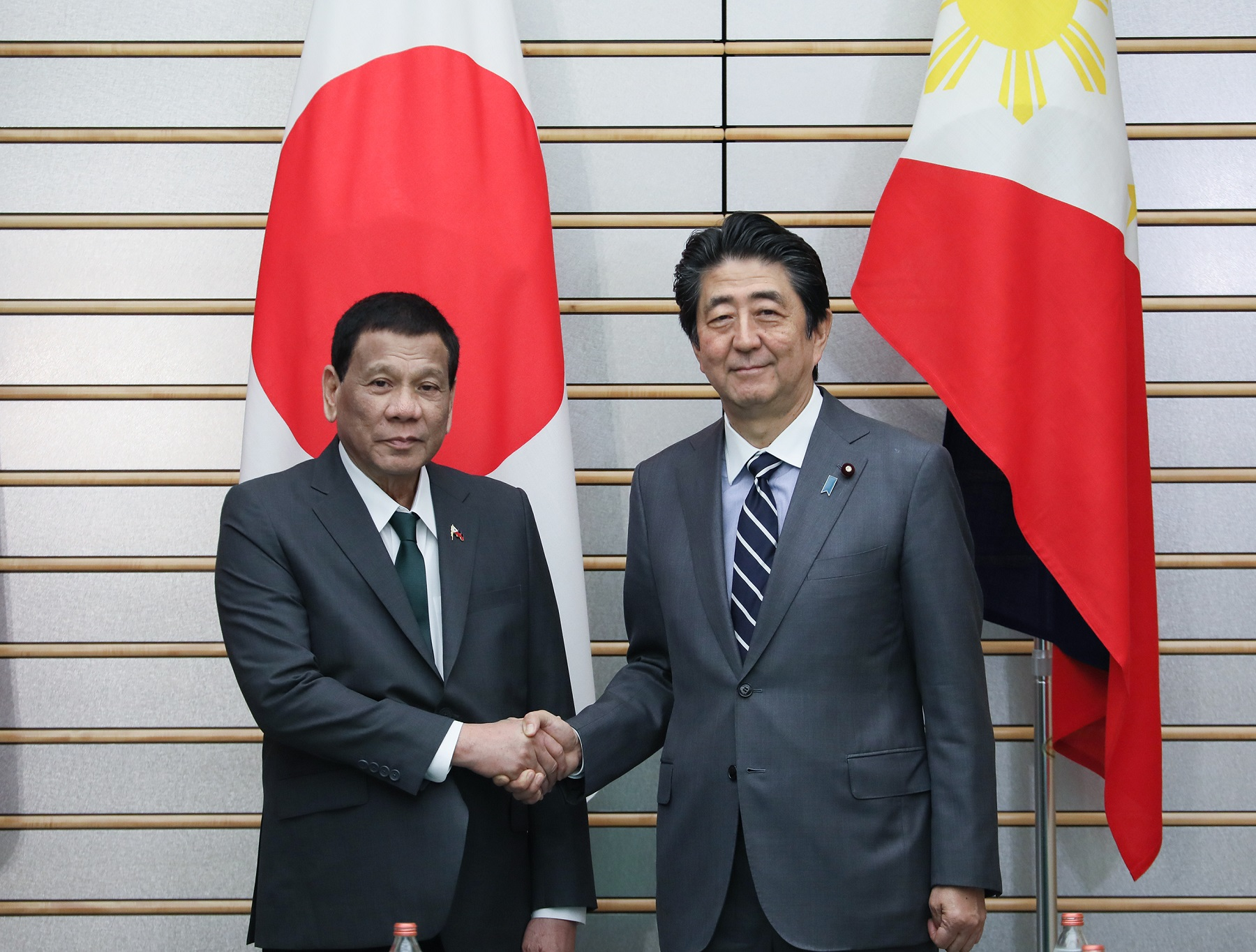
Duterte with Japanese Prime Minister Shinzo Abe during the former's official visit in Tokyo, May 2019

The Duterte administration's foreign policy rhetorically espoused diplomacy and independence from foreign interference. During his first year in office, Duterte made 21 international trips, which included seven state visits and four summit meetings.

=== ASEAN ===
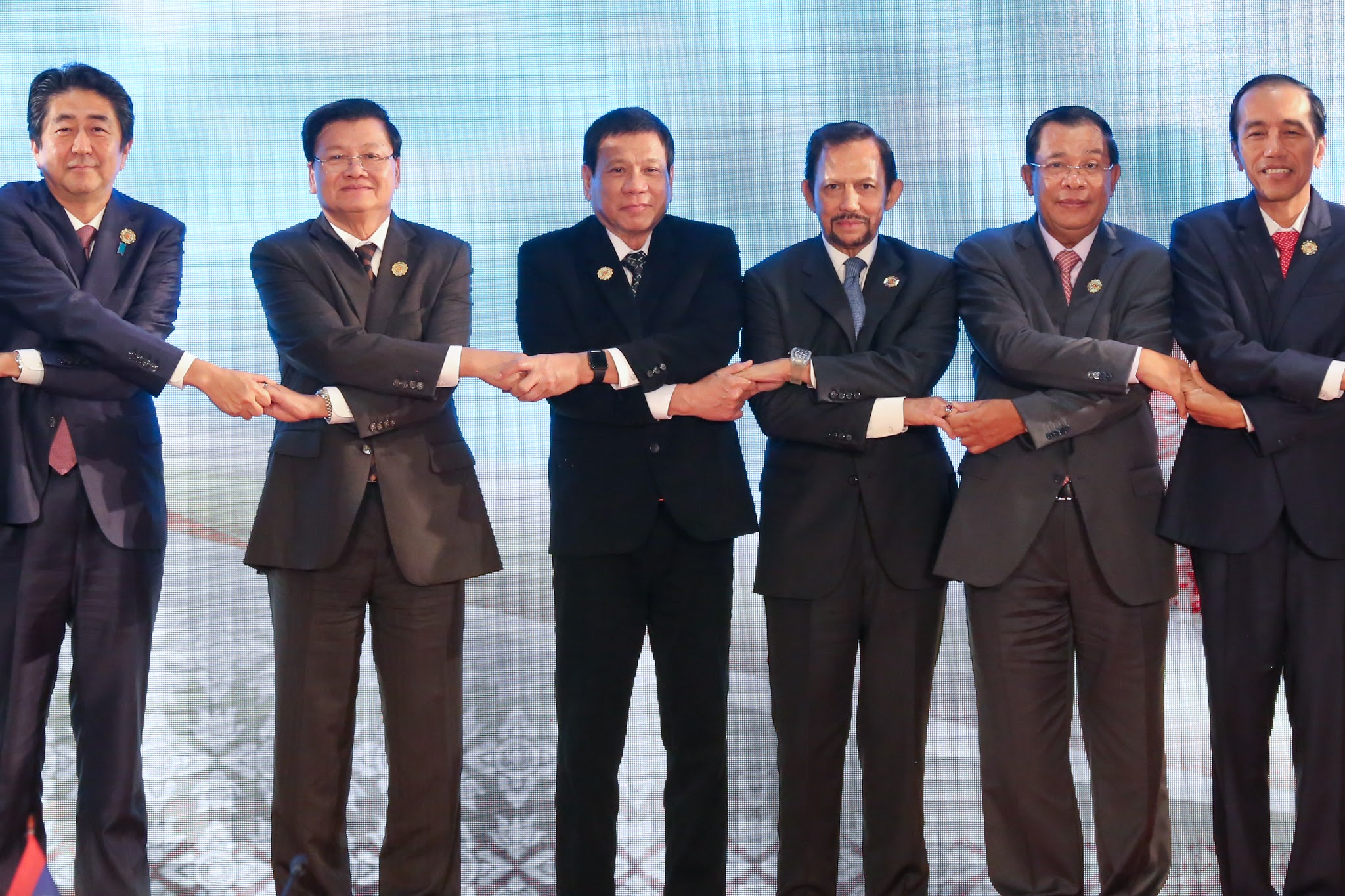
Duterte (3rd from left) and other leaders from ASEAN and its nearby countries hold hands as a symbol of unity in Vientiane, Laos, September 7, 2016.

Duterte placed great importance on the Philippines' diplomatic relations with its Association of Southeast Asian Nations (ASEAN) neighbors. Following tradition, his first trips outside the country were to Laos on September 7, 2016, for the 49th ASEAN Leaders Summit, Indonesia on September 9, Vietnam on September 29, Malaysia on November 9, Cambodia on December 13, Singapore on December 15, Thailand on March 17, and Myanmar on March 19.

In 2017, the Philippines was chair and host to the ASEAN summits; the culminating event was held in Manila on November 10–14 (31st summit). Duterte and other ASEAN leaders signed the ASEAN Consensus on the Protection and Promotion of the Rights of Migrant Workers, a landmark document that would ensure social protection of migrant workers in the ASEAN region; however, the consensus was silent on undocumented workers.

=== China and United States ===
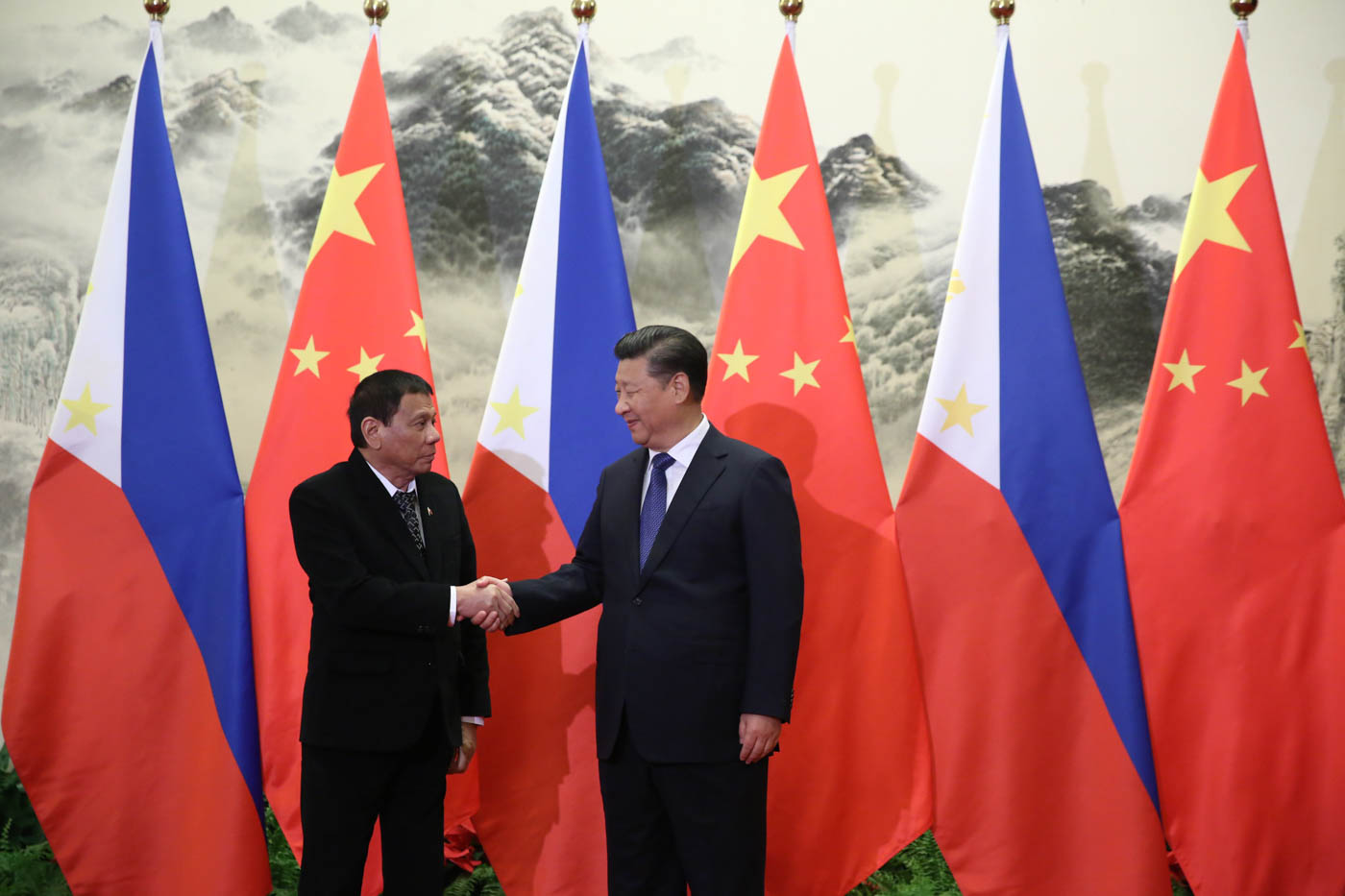
Duterte and Chinese President Xi Jinping prior to the bilateral meetings at the Great Hall of the People in Beijing, October 20, 2016

Early in his presidential tenure, Duterte made efforts to distance the Philippines from the United States, and forge closer relationships with China and Russia, particularly in economic and military cooperation. Duterte expressed his intention to scale back military agreements with the United States, and to conduct joint military exercises with China's People's Liberation Army. Duterte also sought to source weapons from China and Russia after the U.S. State Department refused to sell assault rifles to the Philippine police due to human rights violations concerns relating to the drug war.

Seeking to avoid armed conflict, Duterte adopted a conciliatory and friendly stance towards China that was unlike his predecessor's antagonism toward it. In 2016, Duterte and Chinese president Xi Jinping created the biannual Bilateral Consultation Mechanism on the South China Sea, a process allowing the two nations to peacefully manage disputes and strengthen their relations. In May 2017, Duterte said Xi had threatened war if the Philippines tried to enforce the South China Sea Arbitration ruling and drill for oil in the South China Sea.

Duterte also hoped a non-confrontational approach to China would eventually lead to joint exploration of the South china Sea to support Build! Build! Build!. During Xi's first state visit to the country in November 2018, the Philippines and China signed 29 agreements, including cooperation on the Belt and Road Initiative and a memorandum of understanding on joint oil-and-gas developments in the South China Sea. In September 2019, Duterte said Xi had offered the Philippines a controlling stake in a gas deal in the Reed Bank if the Philippines set aside the South China Sea Arbitration ruling.

In April 2017, Duterte ordered the Armed Forces of the Philippines to occupy and fortify several uninhabited islands in the South China Sea. Following the sighting of Chinese survey vessels, he ordered the Philippine Navy to build structures on Benham Rise to assert the Philippines' sovereignty over the region. A month later, he signed an executive order formally renaming Benham Rise to Philippine Rise.

Chinese aggression in the South China Sea strained the nations' relationship. In April 2017, Chinese Ambassador to the Philippines Zhao Jianhua called Philippine plans to repair Thitu (Pag-asa) Island illegal. Between 2018 and 2020, China deployed hundreds of military vessels around Thitu Island to impede these repairs. In April 2019, following a military report at least 275 Chinese vessels had been monitoring the region since January, Duterte threatened to send Philippine soldiers on a "suicide mission" should China further encroach. In January 2021, China passed a law authorizing its coast guard to fire on foreign vessels as needed and in March, it moored 220 Chinese vessels believed to be manned by the Chinese military at disputed Whitsun Reef. In response, Duterte authorized foreign-affairs secretary Teodoro Locsin Jr. to submit several diplomatic protests.

75th Session of the United Nations General Assembly
Duterte affirms the Philippines v. China arbitral ruling before the United Nations General Assembly on September 22, 2020.

By June 2020, Duterte was gradually distancing the Philippines from China. In July that year, he called on the Department of Foreign Affairs to demand China recognize the South China Sea Arbitration ruling. During the 75th United Nations General Assembly in September 2020, Duterte stated that "the Award is now part of international law".

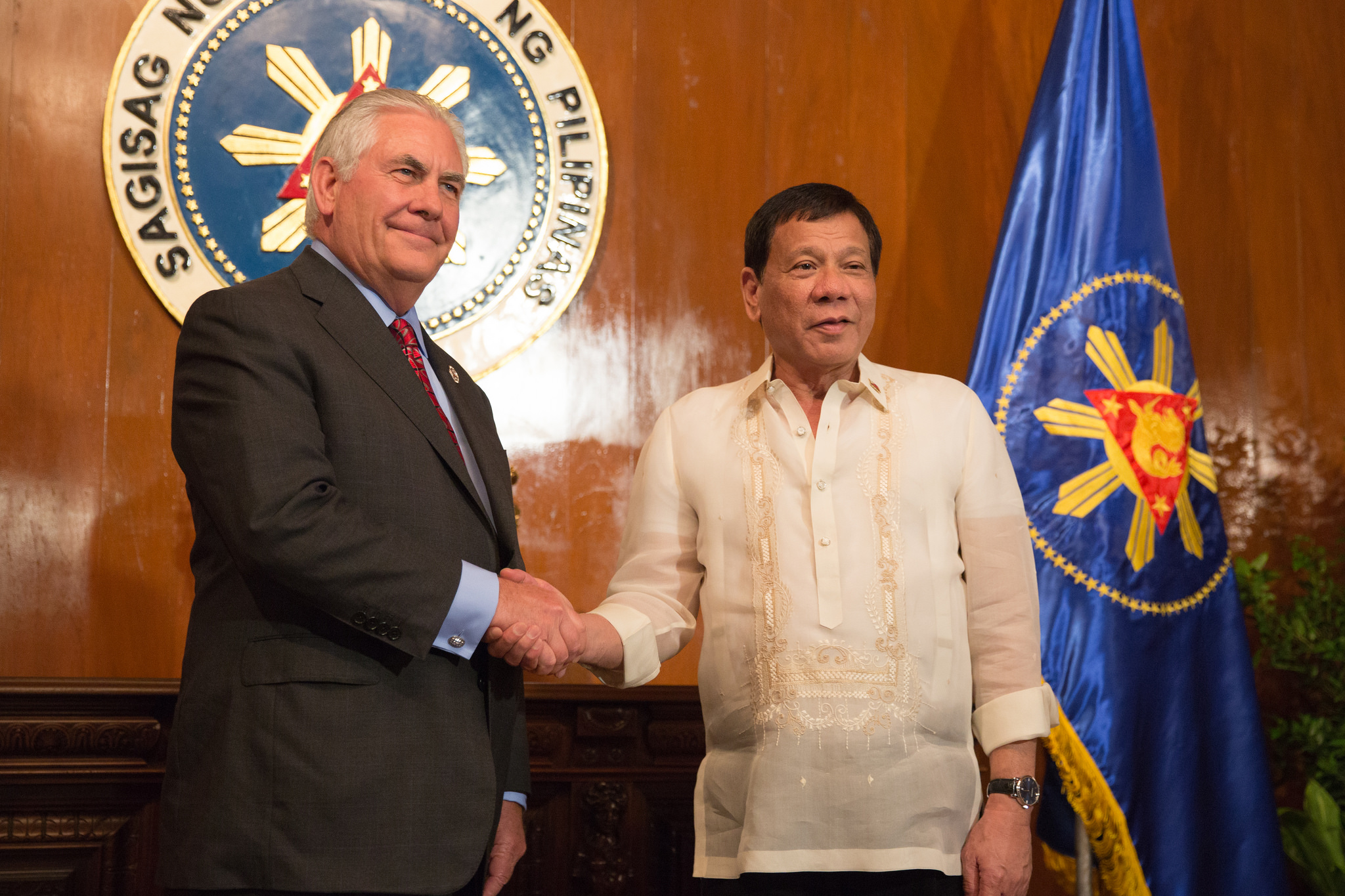
Duterte with U.S. Secretary of State Rex Tillerson during the latter's official visit in Manila, August 7, 2017

In January 2020, when the U.S. denied a visa for Senator Ronald dela Rosa due to his role as police chief during the Philippine anti-drug war, Duterte moved to terminate the Visiting Forces Agreement (VFA). Duterte repeatedly postponed the termination between June 2020 and June 2021, canceling it in July 2021 during U.S. Secretary of Defense Lloyd Austin's visit to the Philippines. Following criticism over vaccine-procurement delays during the COVID-19 pandemic, Duterte used the VFA as leverage for securing vaccines from the U.S.; in August 2021, he thanked the U.S. for its donations, which he said played a key role in his decision to keep the VFA.

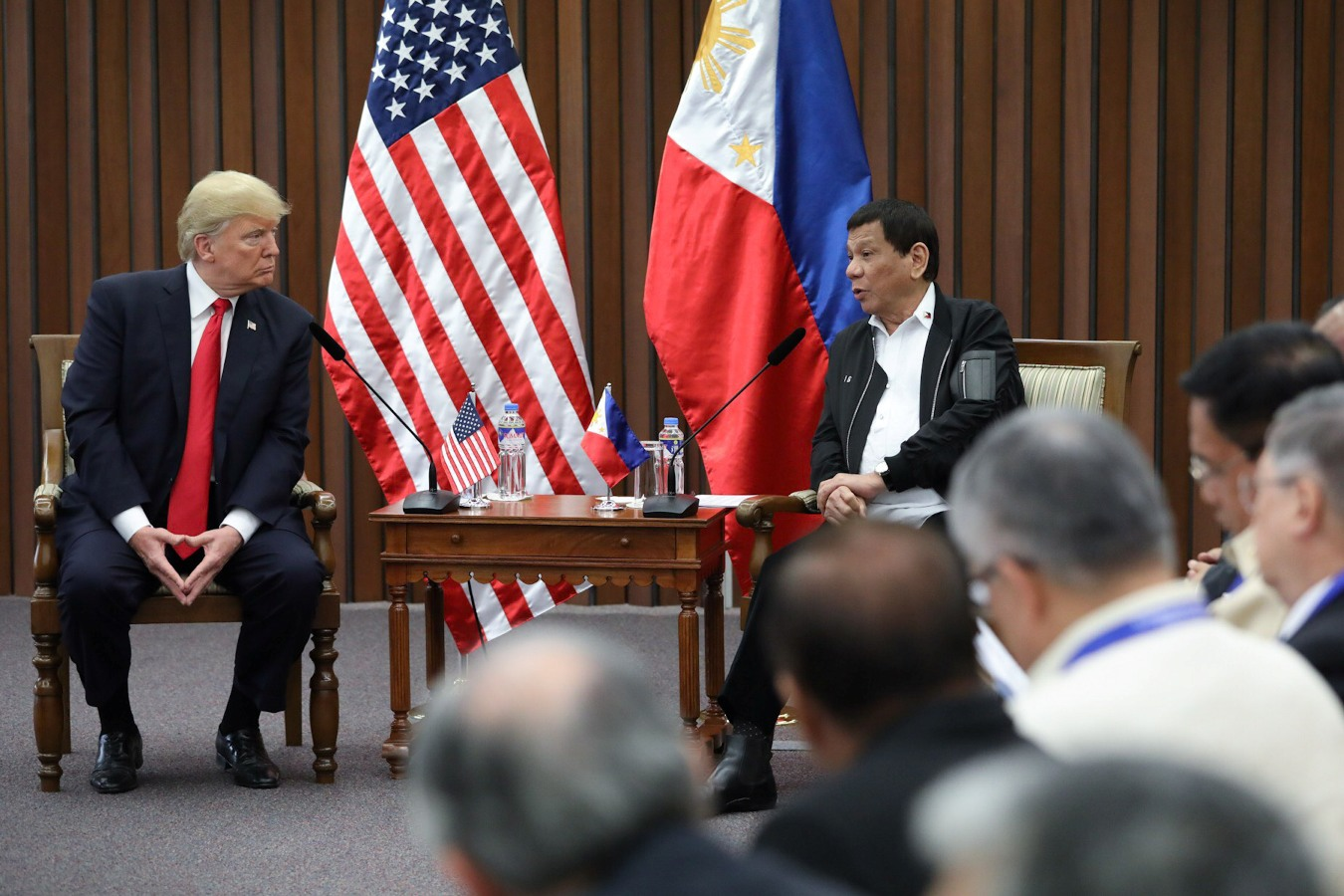
Duterte with U.S. President Donald Trump during a bilateral meeting in Pasay City, November 13, 2017

In December 2020, the Philippines received military equipment worth ₱1.4 billion ($29 million) from the U.S. The countries made efforts to reinvigorate relations. This included high-level visits by commander of U.S. Indo-Pacific Command, Adm. John Aquilino, who affirmed the Mutual Defense Treaty (MDT) with the Philippines, and Marine Corps Commandant David H. Berger. In September 2021, foreign-affairs secretary Teodoro Locsin Jr. and defense secretary Delfin Lorenzana met with counterparts in the U.S. to celebrate the 70th anniversary of the U.S.-Philippines MDT. In the same month, Locsin welcomed the AUKUS nuclear submarine deal, which he said could help balance the power in the Indo-Pacific region; days after, Duterte expressed concern the AUKUS deal could provoke a "nuclear arms race".

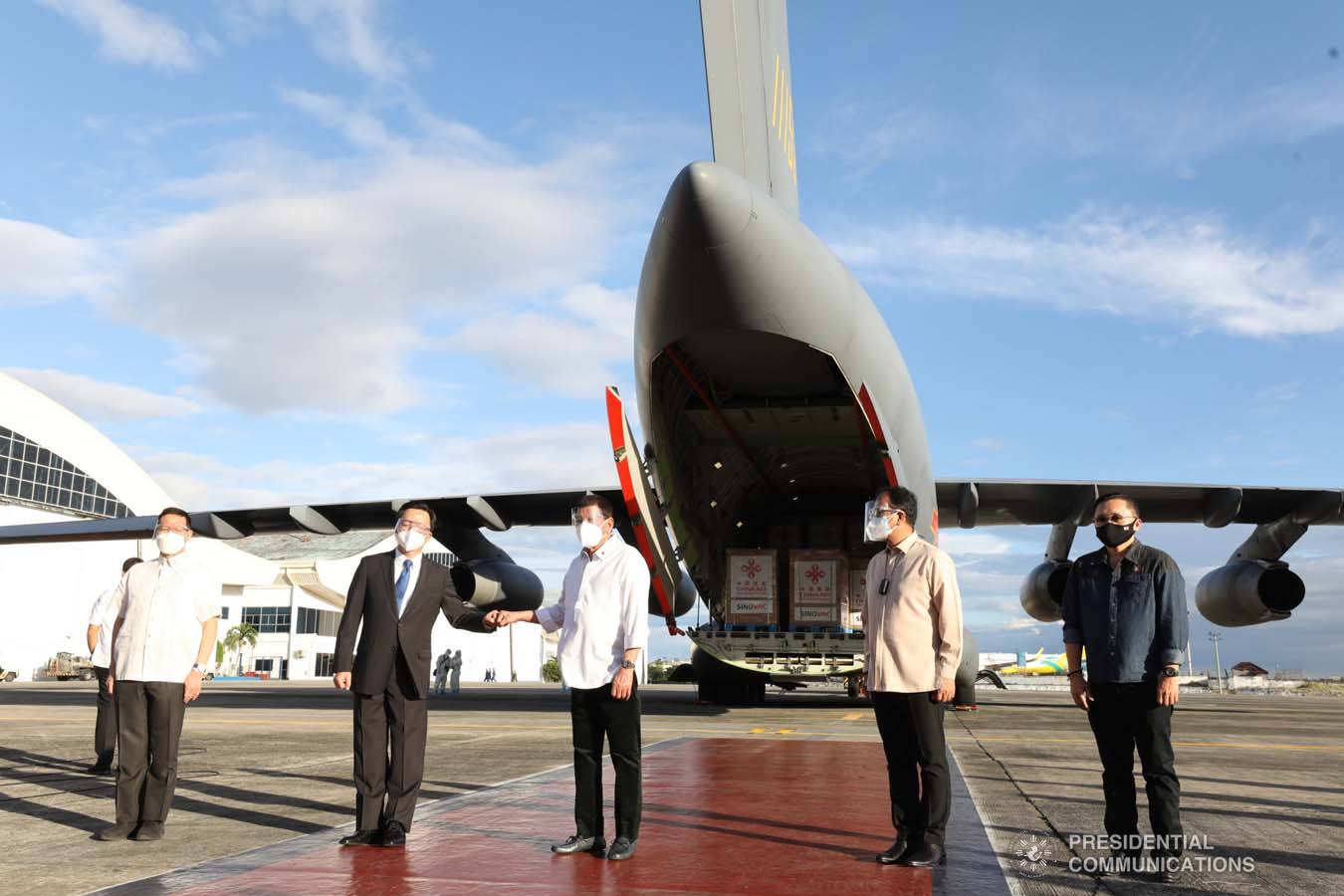
Duterte (center) does a fist bump with Chinese Ambassador Huang Xilian during the ceremonial turnover of CoronaVac vaccines in Villamor Air Base, Pasay City on February 28, 2021.

China played an important role in the early months of the Philippines' response to COVID-19. In February 2021, China became the first country to send the Philippines COVID-19 vaccines; Duterte said he had asked Xi for assistance in securing vaccines. On January 16, 2022, China donated ₱1 billion of non-combat military equipment, two days after the Philippines made a deal with India to buy the BrahMos supersonic cruise missile to improve its coastal defense.

In March 2022, Duterte warned trouble might occur if the next Philippine administration chose not to honor the memorandum of understanding with China on joint-exploration activities in the South China Sea, after receiving a "reminder" from a man from China whom he did not identify. On June 24, six days before his term ended, Duterte ordered the complete termination of the planned joint oil exploration in the South China Sea with China; Locsin stated in the three years since it was signed, the "objective of developing oil and gas resources so critical for the Philippines" had not been achieved.

Amid the Russian invasion of Ukraine in March 2022, Duterte pledged to open the country's facilities to American forces under the 1951 MDT if the conflict spreads to Asia.

=== Russia ===
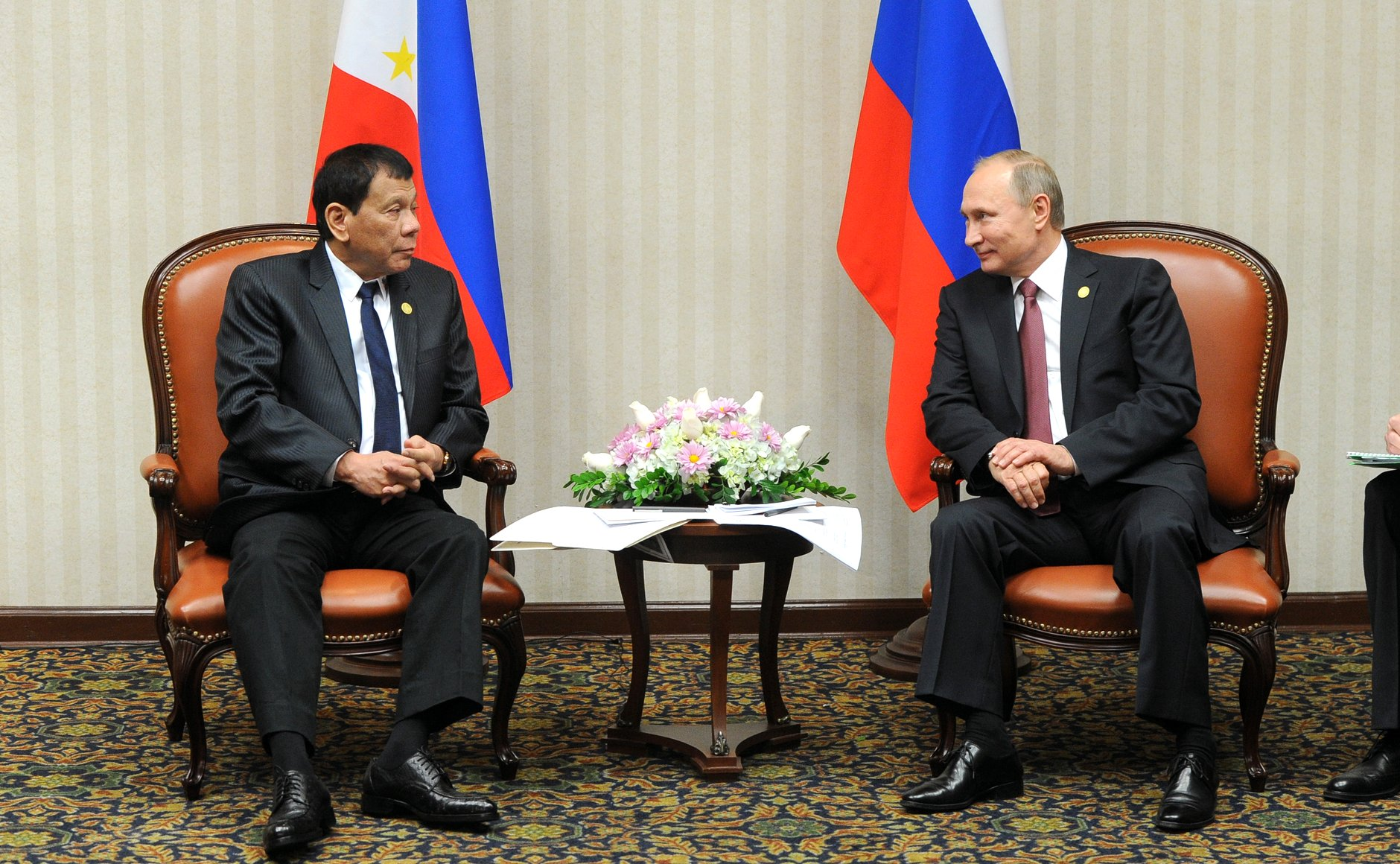
Duterte meets with Russian President Vladimir Putin during the APEC summit in Lima, Peru, November 19, 2016.

Philippine-Russian relations improved during Duterte's presidency. On November 20, 2016, Duterte met with Russian President Vladimir Putin at the APEC summit in Lima, Peru; Duterte has praised Putin's leadership skills, calling him his "idol". Duterte stated the Philippines could seek stronger diplomatic cooperation with China and Russia "to make the world more peaceful" but that the Philippines was "not ready" for military alliances due to the United States-Philippines Mutual Defense Treaty. The Russian government offered a strategic partnership with the Philippines and offered to assist the purchasing of Russian-made weaponry.

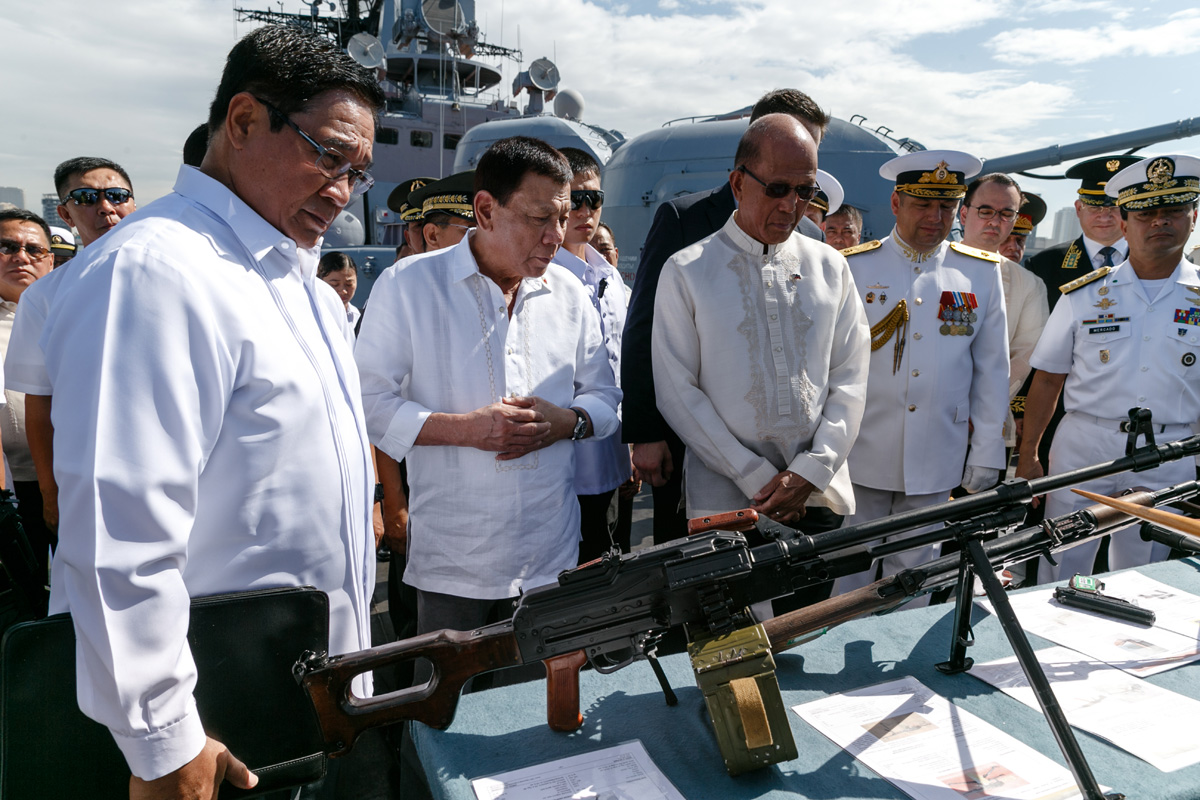
Duterte (foreground, 2nd from left) during the ceremonial handing over of a batch of Russian military products to the Philippines on October 25, 2017

In May 2017, Duterte made his first state visit to Russia and met with Putin to finalize a defense-cooperation agreement between the nations but the visit was cut short when Islamic militants attacked Marawi. In October the same year, the Philippines and Russia signed an agreement of defense and technical cooperation, which included a sales contract for the purchase of defense articles with Russian state-owned company Rosoboronexport; Russia donated thousands of rifles, helmets, and other military equipment to the Philippines.

On October 2, 2019, Duterte made his second state visit to Russia to discuss increasing security and defense cooperation. During the visit, he received an honorary doctorate degree for international relations or foreign diplomacy from the Moscow State Institute of International Relations.

At the height of the COVID-19 pandemic in April 2021, Duterte and Putin held a teleconference to discuss production and supply of coronavirus vaccines, defense, and trade opportunities; Duterte informed Putin of his plan to order 20 million doses of Sputnik V vaccine from Russia. On May 1 that year, 15,000 Sputnik V vaccines purchased by the government arrived in the Philippines.

A few days after the Russian invasion of Ukraine began in February 2022, the Philippines voted in favor of a United Nations resolution, expressing "explicit condemnation" of the invasion. Duterte described Putin, whom he considers a friend, as "suicidal" and said the invasion deserved condemnation. He said the Philippines would remain neutral on the issue. Amid rising global oil prices brought about by the invasion, in May 2022, Duterte contradicted Putin's labeling of the invasion as a "special military operation", saying the invasion was a war waged against "a sovereign nation". A few days before he left office, Duterte approved his administration's cancellation of its order of 16 Mil Mi-17 military helicopters from Russia for fear of United States sanctions amid the ongoing Russia-Ukraine war.

=== Support for refugees ===
Duterte expressed willingness to accept refugees such as Rohingya people fleeing war and persecution in Myanmar, people fleeing Afghanistan to escape the Taliban's rule, and Ukrainian refugees. On September 9, 2021, Foreign Affairs Secretary Teodoro Locsin, Jr. said the Philippines has welcomed Afghan refugees to the country since the Taliban took control of Afghanistan three weeks prior but provided no further details for the refugees' safety and privacy.

On February 28, 2022, Duterte issued an executive order institutionalizing access to protection services for refugees, stateless persons, and asylum seekers.

== Impeachment attempt ==
On March 16, 2017, opposition politician Gary Alejano filed an impeachment complaint against Duterte citing thousands of deaths in Duterte's anti-drug campaign, alleged leadership of vigilante group Davao Death Squad, and allegations of graft and corruption. Alejano, on March 30, filed a supplemental complaint over Duterte's alleged inaction and "defeatist stance" in the South China Sea, Scarborough Shoal, and Benham Rise. On May 15, the House Justice Committee officially dismissed the charge by unanimous vote due to insufficient evidence after Alejano said he had no personal knowledge of the alleged offenses, having based his impeachment complaint on news reports and witness testimonies.

== Elections during the Duterte presidency ==
=== 2019 mid-term election ===
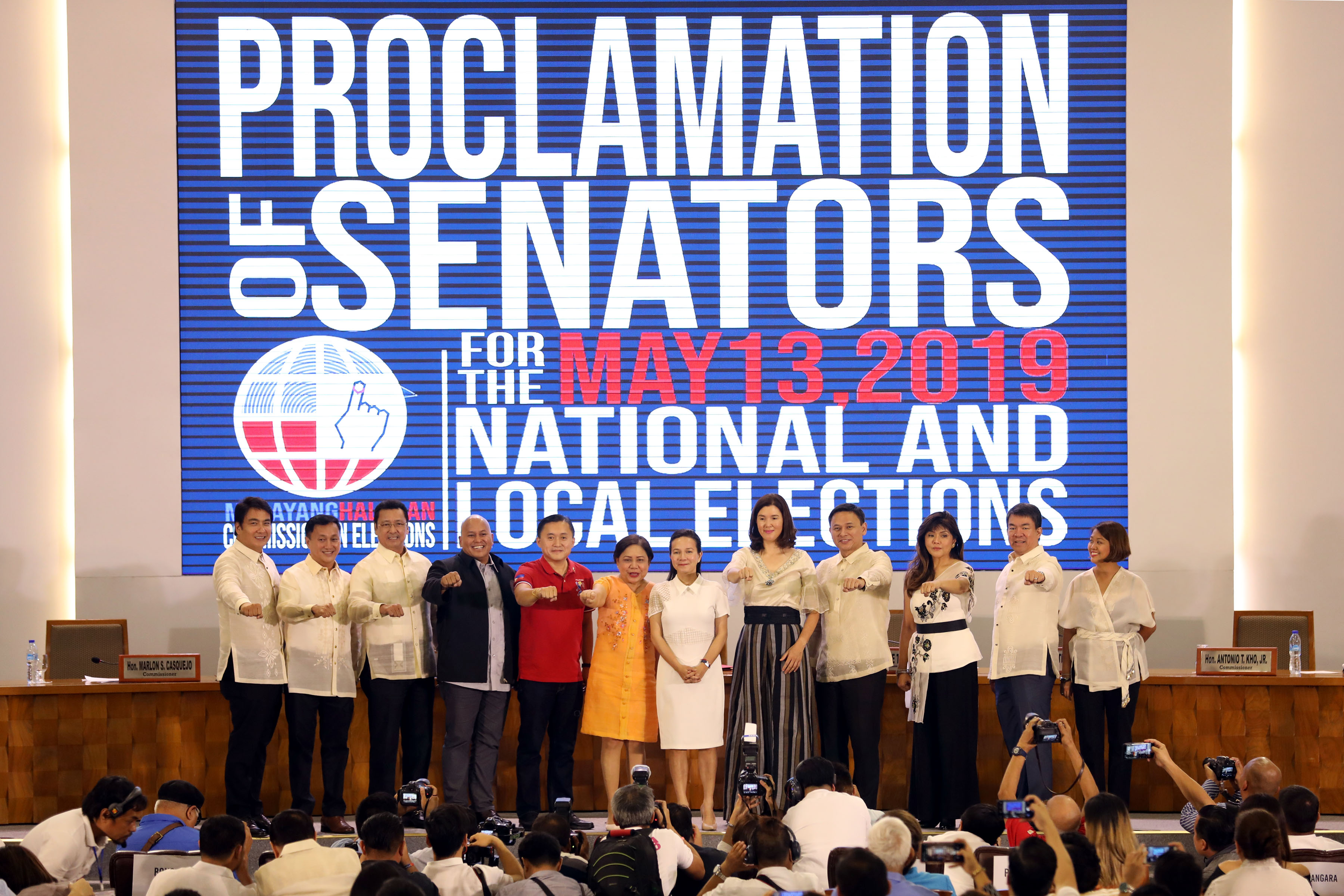
10 of 12 winning senators do Duterte's signature fist bump during their proclamation in Pasay City on May 22, 2019.

Opposition alliance Otso Diretso promoted the 2019 mid-term election as a referendum on Duterte and his administration. Eight of the twelve candidates backed by Duterte's administration won Senate seats; Otso Diretso suffered a historic loss, failing to secure any seats.

=== 2022 general election ===
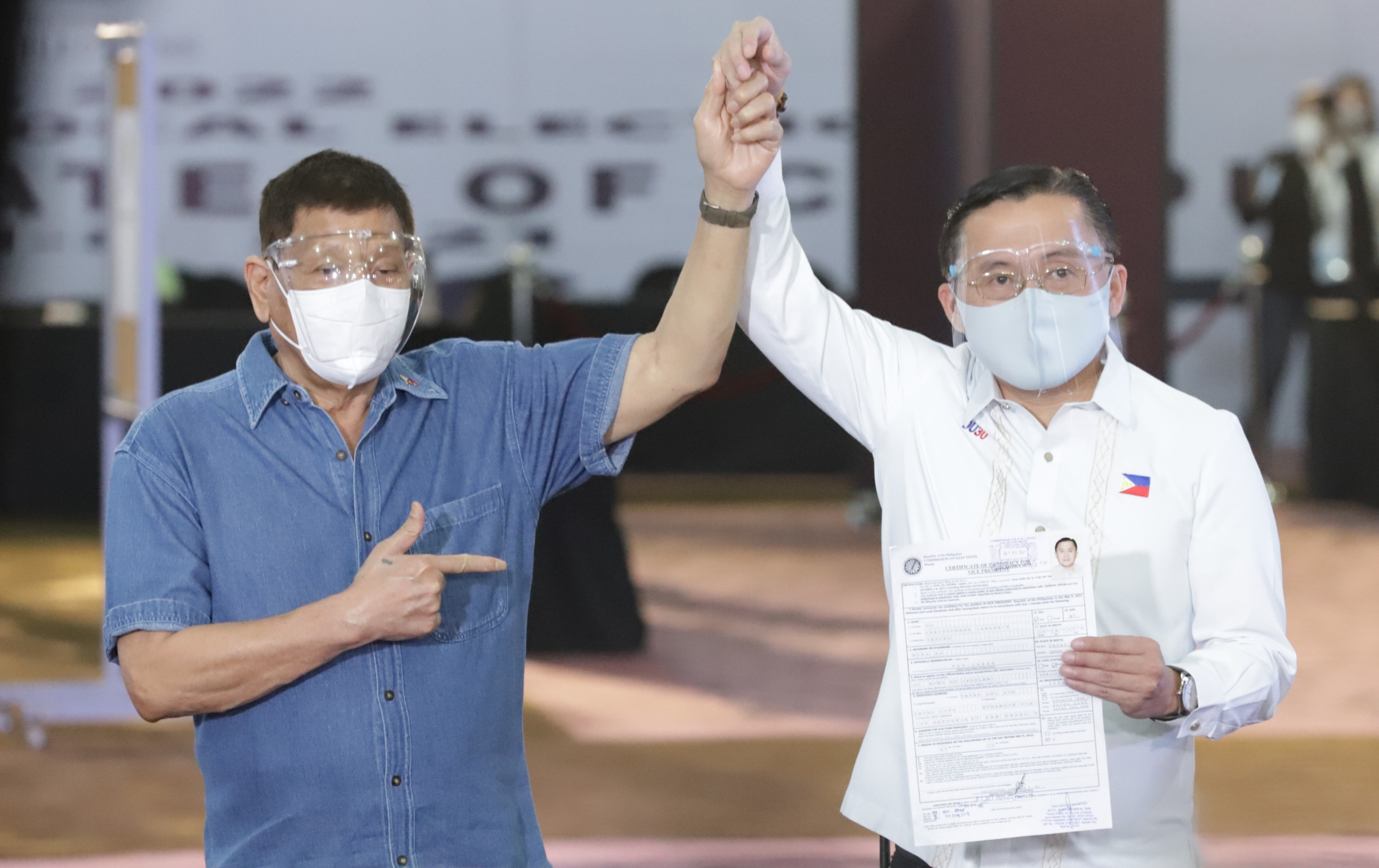
Duterte (left) endorsing Bong Go, who filed his certificate of candidacy for vice president on October 2, 2021.

In August 2021, critics raised the possibility of Duterte extending his term after he announced he would run as vice president. Duterte's party, the PDP–Laban Cusi faction, fielded former Philippine National Police chief and Senator Ronald dela Rosa as president, who was widely suspected of being a placeholder for Duterte's daughter, Davao City mayor Sara Duterte. On October 2, 2021, Duterte withdrew his candidacy and announced his retirement from politics, and his long-time aide, Senator Bong Go, replaced him as the vice-presidential candidate.

On November 13, 2021, Sara unexpectedly decided to run as vice president under the Lakas–CMD party, prompting dela Rosa to withdraw hours later and be replaced by Go. Duterte retracted his planned retirement and announced he would run for vice president to express his dismay for Sara's decision to enter the vice-presidential race when polls showed she was the preferred candidate for presidency; he later withdrew candidacy after deciding not to run against his daughter, and instead announced his intent to run as senator, while endorsing a Go–Sara team.

Sara, however, decided to partner with Bongbong Marcos, who announced his presidential candidacy in November 2021. Go later expressed his disinterest in the presidency. On December 14, hours after Go withdrew his candidacy for president, Duterte withdrew his senate bid.

Duterte remained influential before the national elections because several presidential candidates were open to his endorsement due to his popularity. Allies of Duterte endorsed different candidates after the Cusi faction was left without a leader following Go's withdrawal. The PDP–Laban Cusi faction endorsed presidential candidate Marcos, with some officials calling for Duterte to do the same. Duterte, however, endorsed only Sara as vice president and 17 senatorial candidates, and said he would remain neutral, deciding not to endorse any presidential candidate and prohibiting his Cabinet members from campaigning for any candidate to avoid suspicion he would use public funds for his preferred successor's campaign; and to prevent cabinet members from compromising their integrity. Duterte said the next president should be decisive, compassionate, a good judge of character, and preferably a lawyer, which a PDP–Laban official interpreted as a "virtual endorsement" for Duterte's rival, Vice President Leni Robredo, who also decided to run for president. In March 2022, Go said Duterte briefly met with Marcos and gave him advice on the presidency but could not say whether Duterte endorsed Marcos.

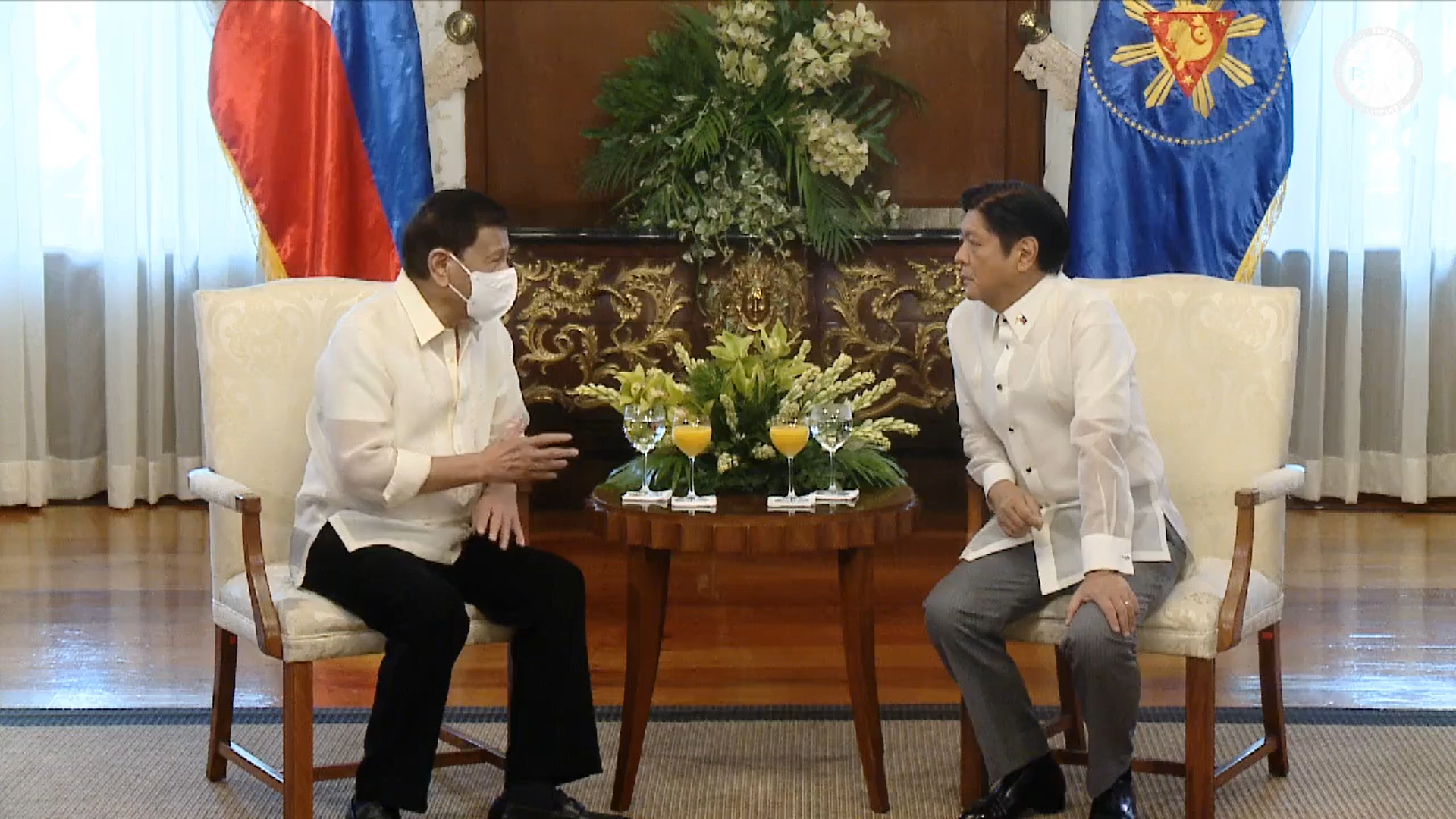
Outgoing President Duterte (left) and president-elect Bongbong Marcos speak ahead of Marcos' inauguration on June 30, 2022.

On May 5, 2022, Duterte created a transition committee led by Executive Secretary Salvador Medialdea to oversee the transition of power to the next administration. According to analysts, Duterte's popularity was "inherited" by Marcos and Sara, both of whom won landslides in the election.

== Approval ratings ==
SWS Net satisfaction ratings of Rodrigo Duterte (September 2016–June 2022)
Date	Rating
Sep 2016	+64
Dec 2016	+63
Mar 2017	+63
Jun 2017	+66
Sep 2017	+48
Dec 2017	+58
Mar 2018	+56
Jun 2018	+45
Sep 2018	+54
Dec 2018	+60
Mar 2019	+66
Jun 2019	+68
Sep 2019	+65
Dec 2019	+72
Nov 2020	+79
May 2021	+65
Jun 2021	+62
Sep 2021	+52
Dec 2021	+60
Apr 2022	+65
Jun 2022	+81

Duterte's approval rating remained relatively high throughout his presidency despite criticism and international opposition to his anti-narcotics drive. Two weeks into Duterte's presidency, on July 13, 2016, Social Weather Stations (SWS) conducted the first approval survey since his inauguration; Duterte received an "excellent" trust rating of 79% among 1,200 Filipino adults. A week later, Pulse Asia released a poll conducted on July 2–8 showing 91% of Filipinos trusted Duterte, making him the most-trusted official in the Philippines since 1999. Duterte's net-satisfaction was at its lowest value 45% in July 2018; it recovered to 54% in September 2018 and 60% in December that year.

By July 2019, halfway through his six-year term in office, Duterte had a record net-satisfaction rating of 68%. An April 2019 survey put his approval rating at 79%, higher than any of his predecessors at that stage in their presidencies. By December that year, his approval rating was 87% according to Pulse Asia; this was credited to poverty reduction and the successful hosting of the 2019 SEA Games.

Amid the COVID-19 pandemic, a Pulse Asia September 2020 "Ulat ng Bayan Survey" ("Report to the Nation Survey"), showed 84% of Filipinos approved of the government's work to control the spread of COVID-19 and its assistance to those who lost their jobs due to the pandemic; 92% of survey respondents said Duterte has "done well" in preventing the spread of COVID-19 in the country. Duterte's SWS net-satisfaction rating rose to 60% in December 2021, higher than the 52% rating in September 2021, and slightly lower than the 62% rating in June 2021; the survey also noted higher net satisfaction among those vaccinated and those willing to be vaccinated.

Duterte remained popular until the end of his term; according to a PUBLiCUS Asia survey conducted between March 30 to April 6, 2022, 67.2% of 1,500 respondents approved of his performance over the past 12 months while only 15.2% disapproved. A 2021 survey by WR Numero Research showed 54.59% of voters wanted soft continuity of Duterte's policies, 29.57% wanted full continuity, and 15.84% preferred change.

Duterte left office with a net-satisfaction rating of 81%—his highest—according to an SWS survey held between June 26 to 29, 2022. A survey of 1,500 people conducted by PUBLiCUS Asia in June—Duterte's last month in office—showed he was the most-popular post-EDSA president, with a 75% approval of his performance as president, while only 10% expressed disapproval.

== See also ==
- List of executive orders by Rodrigo Duterte
- List of international presidential trips made by Rodrigo Duterte
- List of major acts and legislation during the presidency of Rodrigo Duterte
- Philippine drug war
- Political positions of Rodrigo Duterte
- Protests against Rodrigo Duterte
- Rodrigo Duterte 2016 presidential campaign
