= Discrimination =

Prejudicial treatment based on membership in a certain group

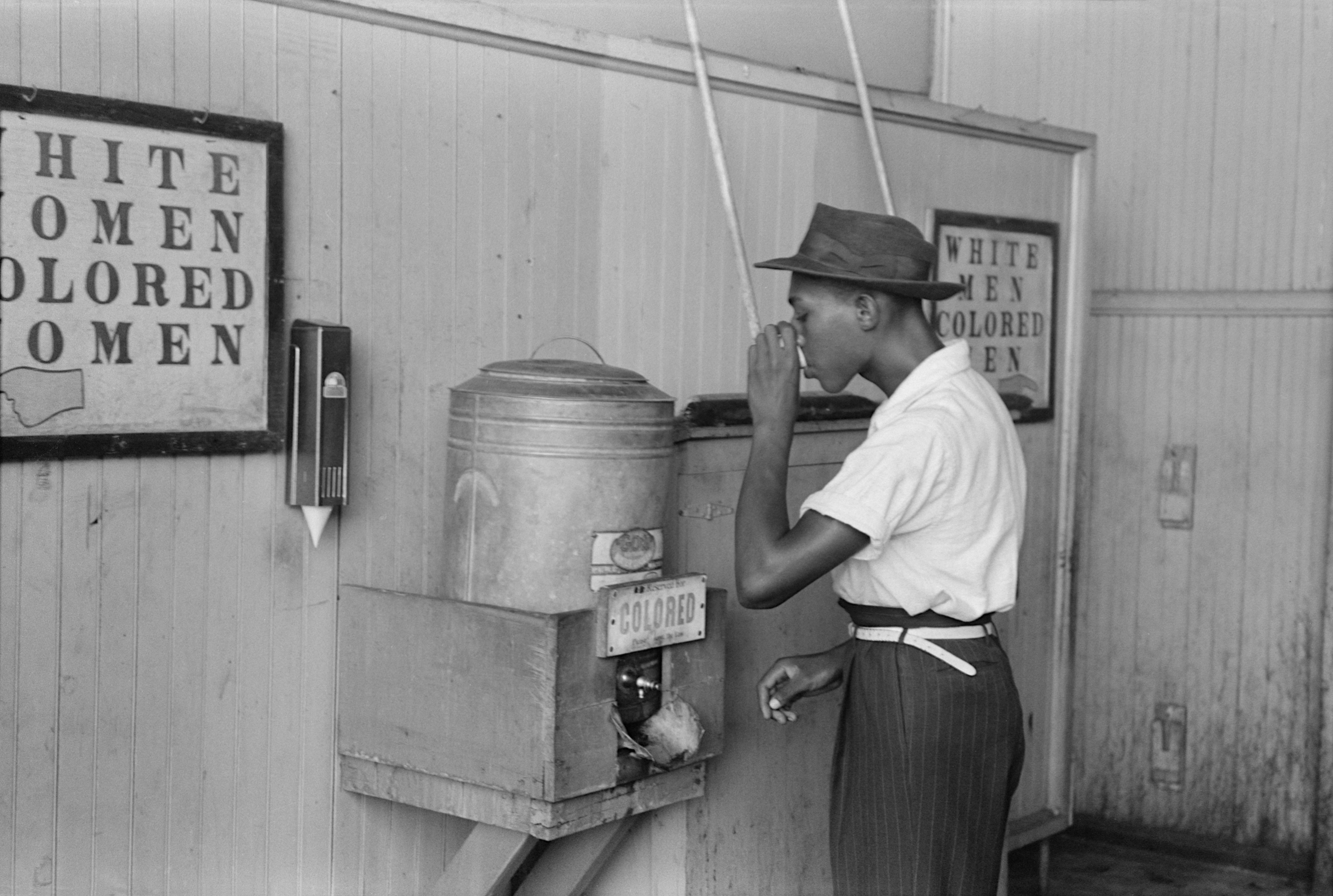
An African-American man drinking from a racially segregated water cooler marked "Colored", in Oklahoma City c. 1939

Discrimination is the process of making unjustified distinctions between people based on the groups, classes, or other categories to which they belong or are perceived to belong, usually in a way that deprives them of their legal or human rights. The group may be identified by a feature such as race, gender, height, age, class, religion, disability or sexual orientation. Discrimination typically leads to groups being unfairly treated on the basis of perceived statuses of characteristics, for example ethnic, racial, gender or religious categories. It involves depriving members of one group of opportunities or privileges that are available to members of another group.

Discriminatory traditions, policies, ideas, practices and laws exist in many countries and institutions in all parts of the world, including those where such discrimination is generally decried. In some places, countervailing measures such as quotas have been used to redress the balance in favor of those who are believed to be current or past victims of discrimination. These attempts have often been met with controversy, and sometimes been called reverse discrimination.

== Etymology ==
The term discriminate appeared in the early 17th century in the English language. It is from the Latin discriminat- 'distinguished between', from the verb discriminare, from discrimen 'distinction', from the verb discernere (corresponding to "to discern"). Since the American Civil War the term "discrimination" generally evolved in American English usage as an understanding of prejudicial treatment of an individual based solely on their race, later generalized as membership in a certain socially disfavored group or social category. Before this sense of the word became almost universal, it was a synonym for discernment, tact and culture as in "taste and discrimination", generally a laudable attribute; to "discriminate against" being commonly disparaged.

== Definitions ==
Moral philosophers have defined discrimination using a moralized definition. Under this approach, discrimination is defined as acts, practices, or policies that wrongfully impose a relative disadvantage or deprivation on persons based on their membership in a salient social group. This is a comparative definition. An individual need not be actually harmed in order to be discriminated against. They just need to be treated worse than others for some arbitrary reason. If someone decides to donate to help orphan children, but decides to donate less, say, to children of a particular race out of a racist attitude, they will be acting in a discriminatory way even if they actually benefit the people they discriminate against by donating some money to them. Discrimination also develops into a source of oppression, the action of recognizing someone as 'different' so much that they are treated inhumanly and degraded.

This moralized definition of discrimination is distinct from a non-moralized definition—in the former, discrimination is wrong by definition, whereas in the latter, this is not the case.

The United Nations stance on discrimination includes the statement: "Discriminatory behaviors take many forms, but they all involve some form of exclusion or rejection." The United Nations Human Rights Council and other international bodies work towards helping ending discrimination around the world.

== Types ==
=== Age ===
Ageism or age discrimination is discrimination and stereotyping based on the grounds of someone's age. It is a set of beliefs, norms, and values which used to justify discrimination or subordination based on a person's age. Ageism is most often directed toward elderly people, or adolescents and children.

Age discrimination in hiring has been shown to exist in the United States. Joanna Lahey, professor at The Bush School of Government and Public Service at Texas A&M, found that firms are more than 40% more likely to interview a young adult job applicant than an older job applicant. In Europe, Stijn Baert, Jennifer Norga, Yannick Thuy and Marieke Van Hecke, researchers at Ghent University, measured comparable ratios in Belgium. They found that age discrimination is heterogeneous by the activity older candidates undertook during their additional post-educational years. In Belgium, they are only discriminated if they have more years of inactivity or irrelevant employment.

In a survey for the University of Kent, England, 29% of respondents stated that they had suffered from age discrimination. This is a higher proportion than for gender or racial discrimination. Dominic Abrams, social psychology professor at the university, concluded that ageism is the most pervasive form of prejudice experienced in the UK population.

=== Caste ===
According to UNICEF and Human Rights Watch, caste discrimination affects an estimated 250 million people worldwide and is mainly prevalent in parts of Asia (India, Sri Lanka, Bangladesh, Pakistan, Nepal, Japan) and Africa. As of 2011, there were 200 million Dalits or Scheduled Castes (formerly known as "untouchables") in India.

=== Citizenship or nationality ===
Discrimination on the basis of nationality, citizenship or naturalization is usually included in employment laws. It may vary from laws that regulate hiring and firing based on citizenship, to forced retirement, compensation and pay, etc., based on immigration status. In the GCC states, in the workplace, preferential treatment is given to full citizens, even though many of them lack experience or motivation to do the job. State benefits are also generally available for citizens only. Citizenship discrimination may show as a "level of acceptance" in a team regarding new team members and employees who differ from the citizenship of the majority of team members. Citizenship discrimination can be sometimes connected with racial discrimination although it can be separate.

=== Class ===
Class discrimination, also known as classism, is prejudice or discrimination on the basis of social class. It includes individual attitudes, behaviors, systems of policies and practices that are set up to benefit the upper class at the expense of the lower class. Social class refers to the grouping of individuals in a hierarchy based on wealth, income, education, occupation, and social network.

=== Disability ===
Discrimination against people with disabilities in favor of people who are not is called ableism or disablism. Disability discrimination, which treats non-disabled individuals as the standard of "normal living", results in public and private spaces, services, workplaces, and educational environments being designed primarily for "standard" users, which can exclude or disadvantage individuals with disabilities.

Some studies have shown that employment can be beneficial for people with disabilities, helping to support mental health and overall well-being. Work may fulfill several basic needs, including social interaction, a sense of purpose, structured activity, and social status, thereby reducing social isolation. However, other research indicates that employment does not always produce positive outcomes, particularly when workplace environments fail to accommodate the specific needs of disabled individuals. In such cases, employment may contribute to stress, exclusion, or reduced well-being. Demographic changes, such as a decline in the working-age population in some regions, have also led to increased attention toward disabled individuals as participants in the labor market for economic reasons.

Empirical research suggests that repeated exposure to ableist microaggressions may have cumulative psychological effects. Studies have linked these experiences to increased levels of psychological distress, reduced self-esteem, and a diminished sense of belonging, particularly among students in higher education settings. These findings indicate that discrimination is not limited to overt exclusion, but also operates through subtle, everyday interactions that can negatively impact well-being over time.

Disability discrimination is also shaped by broader theoretical perspectives. The social model of disability emphasizes that disability arises not only from individual impairments but also from environmental, social, and institutional barriers that limit participation. This contrasts with the medical model, which focuses primarily on the individual's condition. The social model has influenced policy, accessibility standards, and advocacy efforts aimed at reducing barriers and promoting equal participation.

Some studies have shown that employment can be beneficial to people with disabilities, helping to sustain their mental health and well-being. Work can fulfil a number of basic needs for an individual such as collective purpose, social contact, status, and activity, therefore reducing social isolation.

Other research shows that employment is not always beneficial, particularly if a disabled persons needs are not considered. A decline in the working age population, particularly in Europe, is resulting in disabled people being seen as more of a valuable resource, within the labour market, for economic reasons.

In the United States, the Americans with Disabilities Act mandates the provision of equality of access to both buildings and services and is paralleled by similar acts in other countries, such as the Equality Act 2010 in the UK.

=== Excellence ===
Discrimination of excellence is the violation of formal equality of opportunity and meritocracy, which reward merits of individuals and overachievement. Discrimination of excellence can be caused by different reasons, including legacy preferences, nepotism, substantive equality, affirmative action, ageism or random luck.

=== Language ===
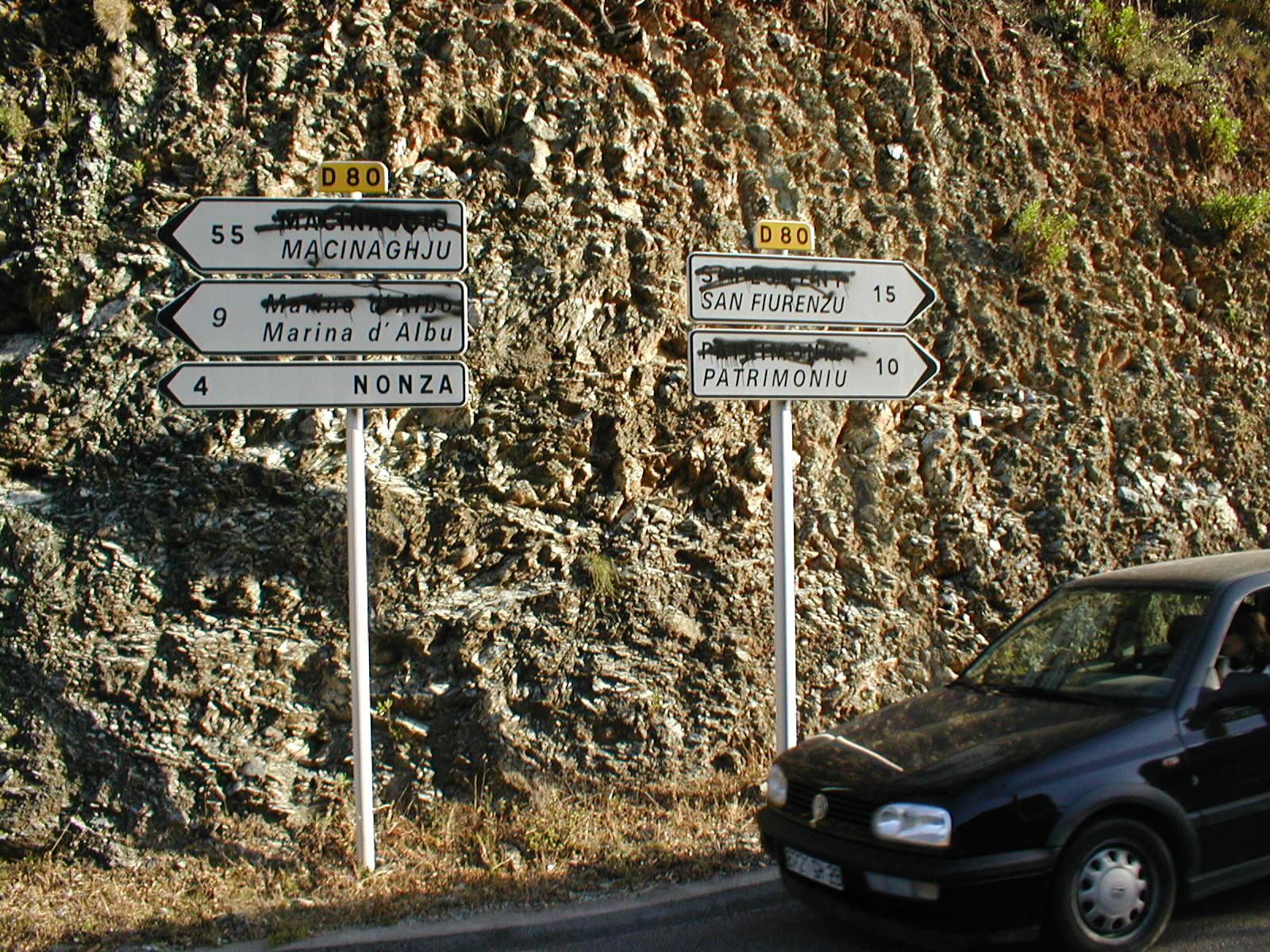
Nationalists in Corsica sometimes spray-paint or shoot traffic signs in French.

Linguistic discrimination (also called glottophobia, linguicism and languagism) is the unfair treatment of people based upon their use of language and the characteristics of their speech, such as their first language, their accent, the perceived size of their vocabulary (whether or not the speaker uses complex and varied words), their modality, and their syntax. For example, an Occitan speaker in France will probably be treated differently from a French speaker.

Based on a difference in use of language, a person may automatically form judgments about another person's wealth, education, social status, character or other traits, which may lead to discrimination. This has led to public debate surrounding localisation theories, likewise with overall diversity prevalence in numerous nations across the West.

Linguistic discrimination was at first considered an act of racism. In the mid-1980s, linguist Tove Skutnabb-Kangas captured the idea of language-based discrimination as linguicism, which was defined as "ideologies and structures used to legitimize, effectuate, and reproduce unequal divisions of power and resources (both material and non-material) between groups which are defined on the basis of language". Although different names have been given to this form of discrimination, they all hold the same definition. Linguistic discrimination is culturally and socially determined due to preference for one use of language over others. Using this same logic, this would make many modern slurs considered to be linguistic discrimination.

Scholars have analyzed the role of linguistic imperialism in linguicism, with some asserting that speakers of dominant languages gravitate toward discrimination against speakers of other, less dominant languages, while disadvantaging themselves linguistically by remaining monolingual.

According to Carolyn McKinley, this phenomenon is most present in Africa, where much of the population speaks European languages introduced during the colonial era; African states are also noted as instituting European languages as the main medium of instruction, instead of indigenous languages. UNESCO reports have noted that this has historically benefited only the African upper class, conversely disadvantaging the majority of Africa's population who hold varying level of fluency in the European languages spoken across the continent.

Scholars have also noted the influence of the linguistic dominance of English on academic disciplines; Anna Wierzbicka, professor of linguistics at the Australian National University, has described disciplines such as the social sciences and humanities as being "locked in a conceptual framework grounded in English", preventing academia as a whole from reaching a "more universal, culture-independent perspective."

=== Name ===
Discrimination based on a person's name may also occur, with researchers suggesting that this form of discrimination is present based on a name's meaning, its pronunciation, its uniqueness, its gender affiliation, and its racial affiliation. Research has further shown that real world recruiters spend an average of just six seconds reviewing each résumé before making their initial "fit/no fit" screen-out decision and that a person's name is one of the six things they focus on most. France has made it illegal to view a person's name on a résumé when screening for the initial list of most qualified candidates. Great Britain, Germany, Sweden, and the Netherlands have also experimented with name-blind summary processes. Some apparent discrimination may be explained by other factors such as name frequency. The effects of name discrimination based on a name's fluency is subtle, small and subject to significantly changing norms.

=== Political views ===
Political discrimination involves treating individuals or groups unfairly based on their political opinions, political party affiliations, or activities. While many international human rights instruments, such as the Universal Declaration of Human Rights, prohibit discrimination based on "political or other opinion," legal protections vary significantly by jurisdiction. Germany, France, Israel, South Africa, New Zealand, and Northern Ireland protect against political discrimination as of 2025.

In many historical and modern contexts, political discrimination manifests in two primary forms:

- Anti-leftism (or opposition to left-wing politics) refers to the opposition, prejudice, or persecution of individuals and groups associated with left-wing views. Historical examples include the McCarthyism in the United States, where individuals suspected of communist sympathies were blacklisted, and the White Terror during and after the Spanish Civil War.
- Anti-rightism (or opposition to right-wing politics) refers to the opposition, prejudice, or persecution of individuals and groups associated with right-wing views. This has occurred in various revolutionary states (e.g. Reign of Terror, Anti-Rightist Campaign, etc) or through social and professional exclusion in highly polarized environments.

Studies in the 21st century, particularly in the United States and Europe, have shown that political affiliation can influence hiring decisions, social interactions, and access to services, a phenomenon often linked to increased political polarization.

=== Race or ethnicity ===
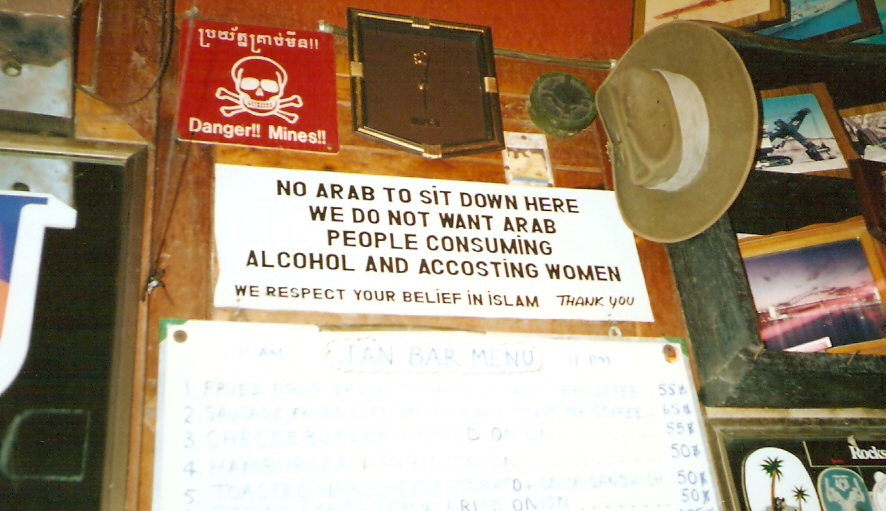
Anti-Arab sign in Pattaya Beach, Thailand

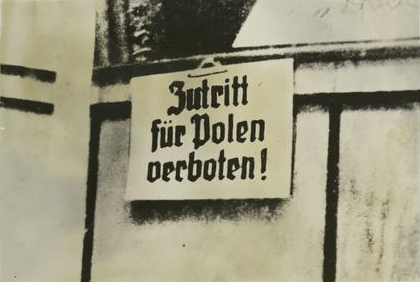
German warning in German-occupied Poland 1939 – "No entrance for Poles!"

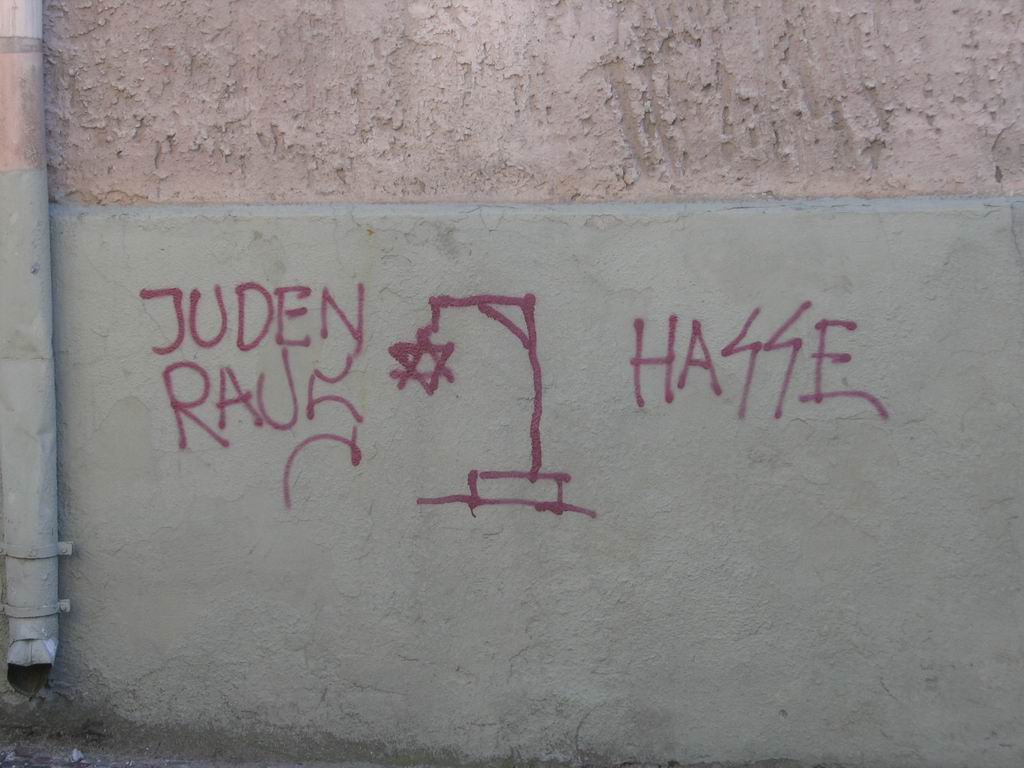
Antisemitic graffiti in Lithuania. The words read Juden raus (German for Jews out) and Hasse (presumably a misspelling of Hass, German for hate).

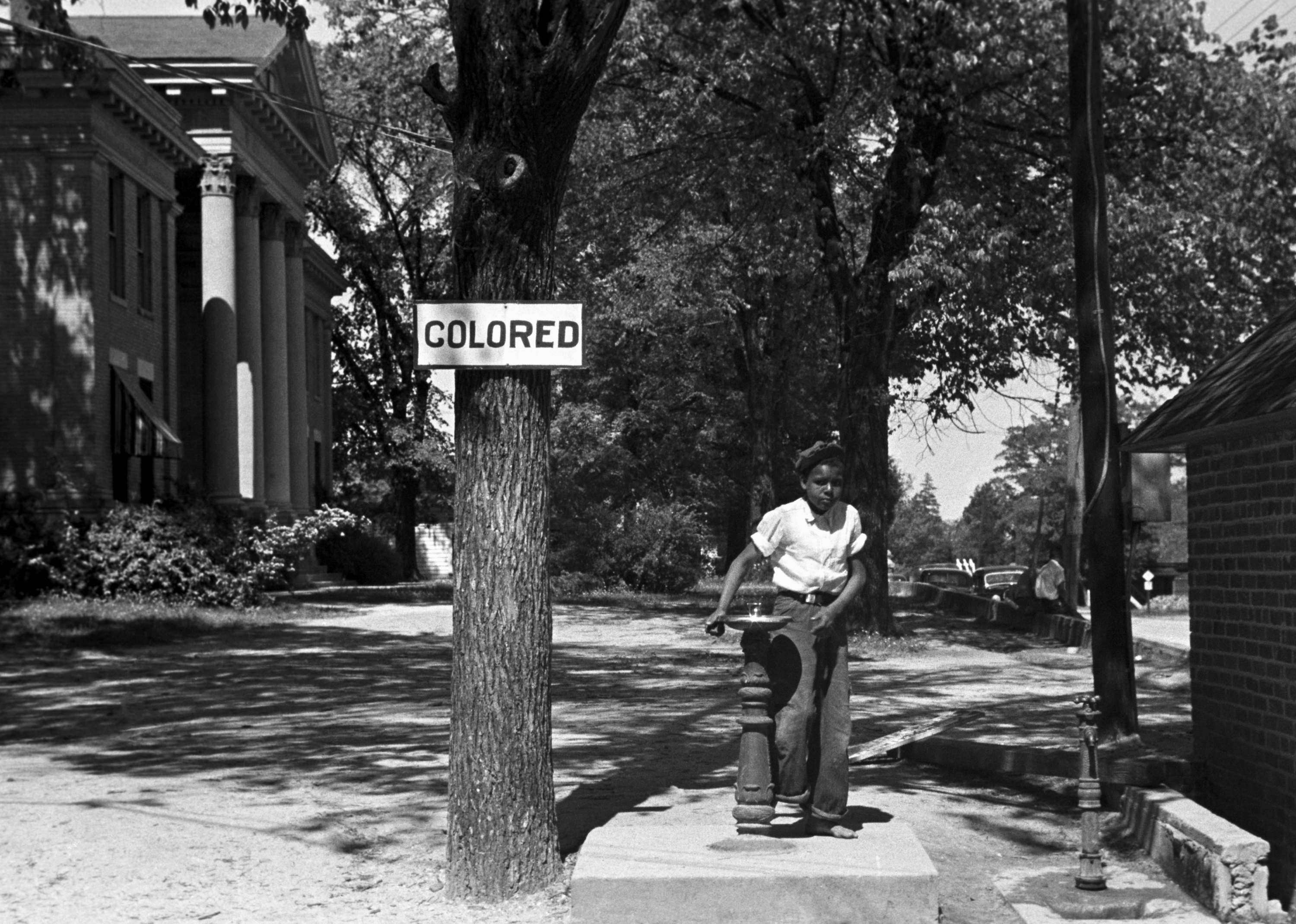
An African-American child at a segregated drinking fountain on a courthouse lawn, North Carolina, US 1938

Racial and ethnic discrimination differentiates individuals on the basis of real and perceived racial and ethnic differences and leads to various forms of the ethnic penalty. It can also refer to the belief that groups of humans possess different behavioral traits corresponding to physical appearance and can be divided based on the superiority of one race over another. It may also mean prejudice, discrimination, or antagonism directed against other people because they are of a different race or ethnicity.

Modern variants of racism are often based in social perceptions of biological differences between peoples. These views can take the form of social actions, practices or beliefs, or political systems in which different races are ranked as inherently superior or inferior to each other, based on presumed shared inheritable traits, abilities, or qualities. It has been official government policy in several countries, such as South Africa during the apartheid era. Discriminatory policies towards ethnic minorities include the race-based discrimination against ethnic Indians and Chinese in Malaysia The concept of multiracism has been used to explain the varieties of race discrimination. After the Vietnam War, many Vietnamese refugees moved to Australia and the United States, where they faced discrimination. Westerners might get paid more than other immigrants in GCC states.

Roma and Sinti are considered one of the most discriminated ethnic groups in the world. They suffered from mass genocide, sterilization and enslavement. The Roma are suspiciously discriminated like the Dom caste they descend from. Rohingya people are also the world's most discriminated-against ethnic group.

Native Americans experienced one of the largest genocides and ethnic cleansing in history. Black people and Jews are also vulnerable ethnic groups.

=== Region ===
Regional or geographic discrimination is a form of discrimination that is based on the region in which a person lives or the region in which a person was born. It differs from national discrimination because it may not be based on national borders or the country in which the victim lives, instead, it is based on prejudices against a specific region of one or more countries. Examples include discrimination against Chinese people who were born in regions of the countryside that are far away from cities that are located within China, and discrimination against Americans who are from the southern or northern regions of the United States. It is often accompanied by discrimination that is based on accent, dialect, or cultural differences.

Japan's regional discrimination manifests primarily through historical prejudice against specific communities, such as the Burakumin and Okinawans, and through enduring stereotypes about residents of different prefectures. Regional discrimination in South Korea is related to rift between Jeolla and Gyeongsang Provinces, and rupture between Seoul and other regions. In particular, discrimination against Jeolla provinces is remarkable, which is evaluated as an instance of internal colonialism promoted by the right-wing military dictatorship. Historical American regional discrimination may include discrimination against southern people by Northern people.

=== Religious beliefs ===
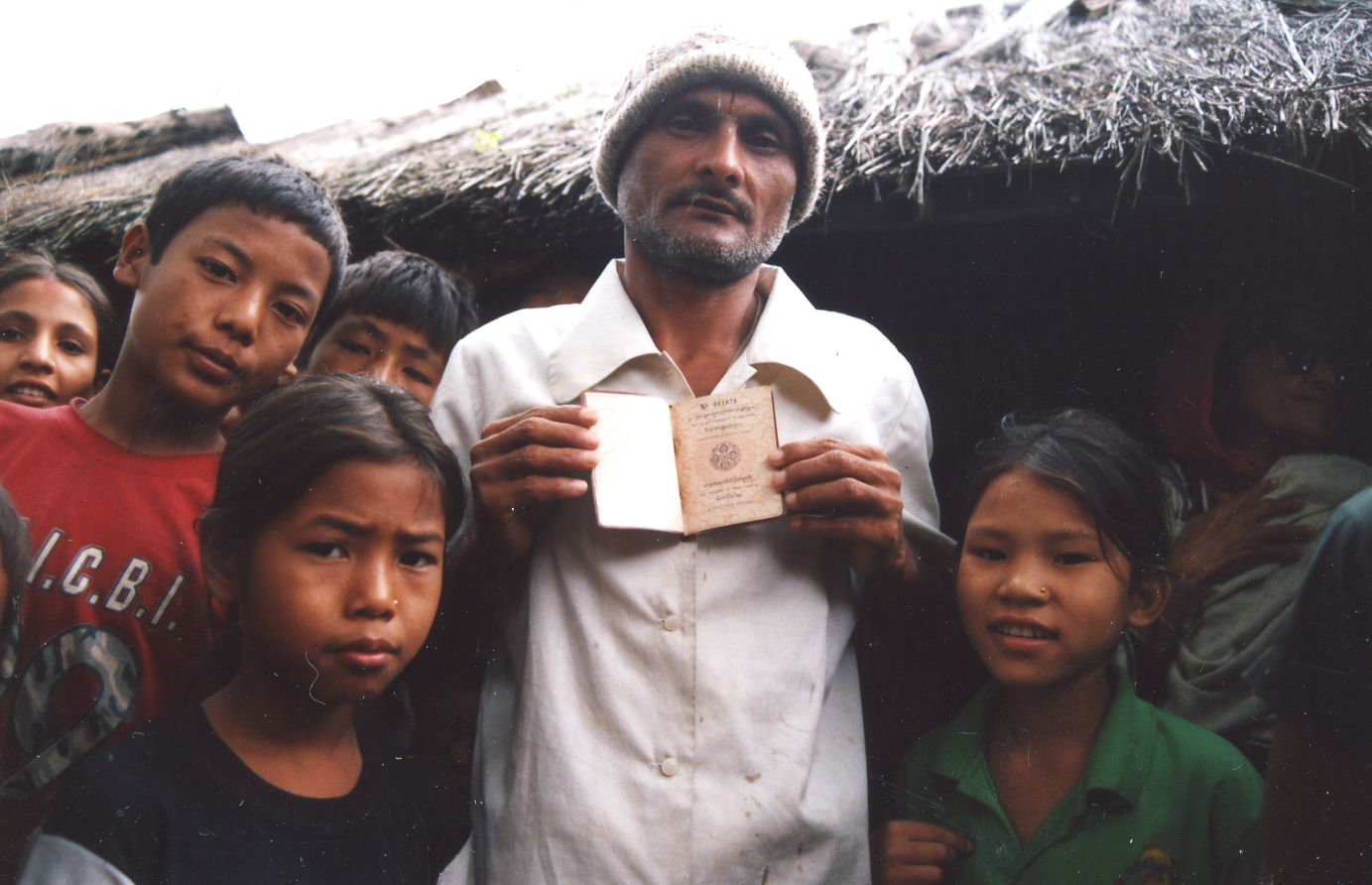
In the 1990s, Bhutan expelled its Hindu population or forced it to leave the country in order to preserve Bhutan's Buddhist culture and identity.

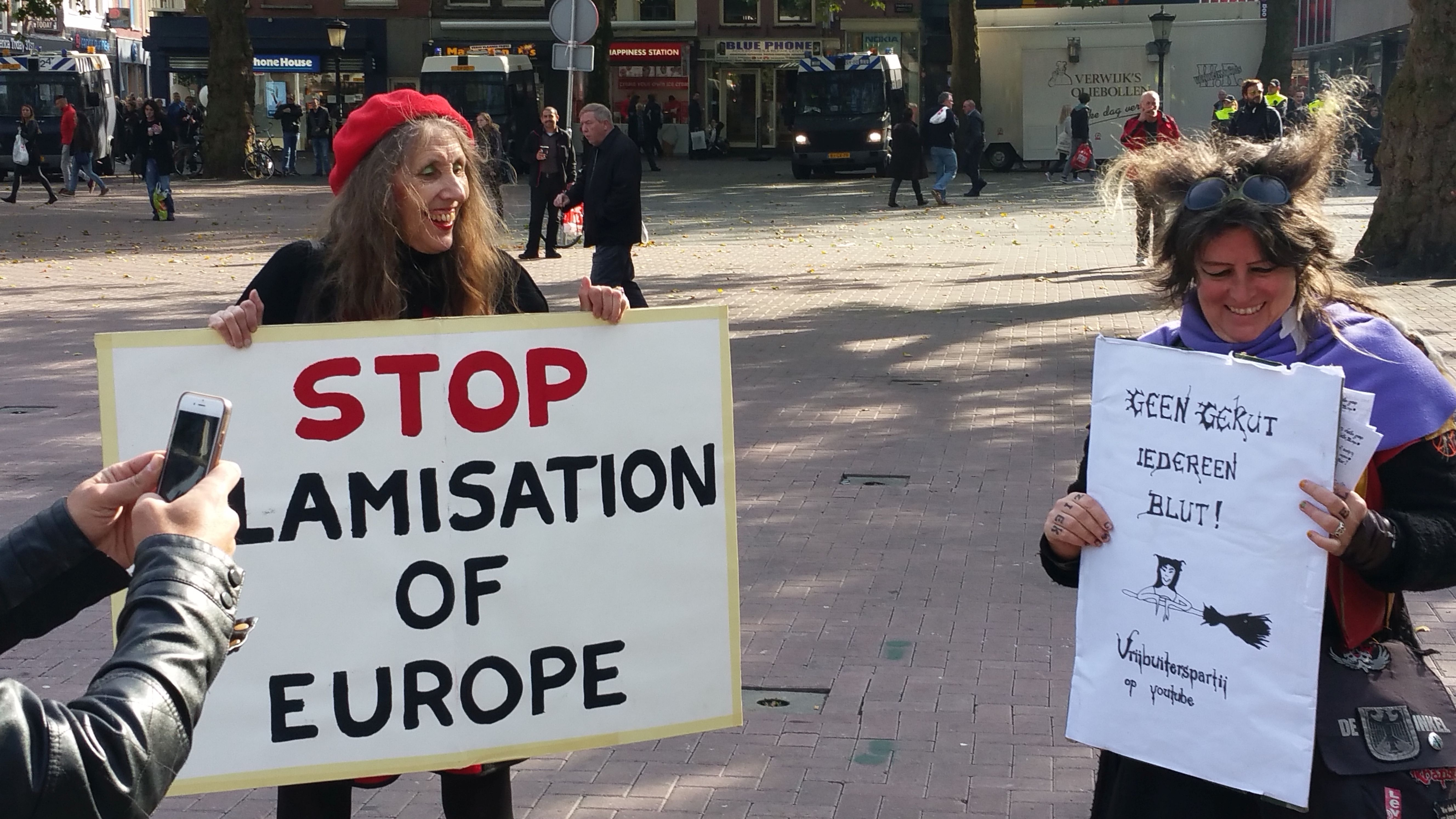
Demonstration against Islam in the 2010s

Religious discrimination is valuing or treating people or groups differently because of what they do or do not believe in or because of their feelings towards a given religion. For instance, the Jewish population of Germany, and indeed a large portion of Europe, was subjected to discrimination under Adolf Hitler and his Nazi party between 1933 and 1945. They were forced to live in ghettos, wear an identifying star of David on their clothes, and sent to concentration and death camps in rural Germany and Poland, where they were to be tortured and killed, all because of their Jewish religion. Many laws (most prominently the Nuremberg Laws of 1935) separated those of Jewish faith as supposedly inferior to the Christian population.

Restrictions on the types of occupations that Jewish people could hold were imposed by Christian authorities. Local rulers and church officials closed many professions to religious Jews, pushing them into marginal roles that were considered socially inferior, such as tax and rent collecting and moneylending, occupations that were only tolerated as a "necessary evil". The number of Jews who were permitted to reside in different places was limited; they were concentrated in ghettos and banned from owning land.

In Saudi Arabia, non-Muslims are not allowed to publicly practice their religions and they cannot enter Mecca and Medina. Furthermore, private non-Muslim religious gatherings might be raided by the religious police. In Maldives, non-Muslims living and visiting the country are prohibited from openly expressing their religious beliefs, holding public congregations to conduct religious activities, or involving Maldivians in such activities. Those expressing religious beliefs other than Islam may face imprisonment of up to five years or house arrest, fines ranging from 5,000 to 20,000 rufiyaa ($320 to $1,300), and deportation.

In Myanmar, 600,000 Rohingya muslims have been forced to become refugees in Bangladesh due to institutionalised religious discrimination, in law, policy and practice. An example is the government refusing to grant them citizenship, making them stateless without legal documentation. In 2015 Buddhist nationalists protested their right to vote in a constitutional referendum.

In a 1979 consultation on the issue, the United States commission on civil rights defined religious discrimination in relation to the civil rights which are guaranteed by the Fourteenth Amendment. Whereas religious civil liberties, such as the right to hold or not to hold a religious belief, are essential for Freedom of Religion (in the United States as secured by the First Amendment), religious discrimination occurs when someone is denied "equal protection under the law, equality of status under the law, equal treatment in the administration of justice, and equality of opportunity and access to employment, education, housing, public services and facilities, and public accommodation because of their exercise of their right to religious freedom".

=== Sex, sex characteristics, gender, and gender identity ===
Sexism is a form of discrimination based on a person's sex or gender. It has been linked to stereotypes and gender roles, and may include the belief that one sex or gender is intrinsically superior to another. Extreme sexism may foster sexual harassment, rape, and other forms of sexual violence. Gender discrimination may encompass sexism and is discrimination toward people based on their gender identity or their gender or sex differences. Gender discrimination is connected to workplace inequality. It may arise from social or cultural customs and norms.

Intersex persons experience discrimination due to innate, atypical sex characteristics. Multiple jurisdictions now protect individuals on grounds of intersex status or sex characteristics. South Africa was the first country to explicitly add intersex to legislation, as part of the attribute of 'sex'. Australia was the first country to add an independent attribute, of 'intersex status'. Malta was the first to adopt a broader framework of 'sex characteristics', through legislation that also ended modifications to the sex characteristics of minors undertaken for social and cultural reasons. Global efforts such as the United Nations Sustainable Development Goal 5 is also aimed at ending all forms of discrimination on the basis of gender and sex.

=== Sexual orientation ===
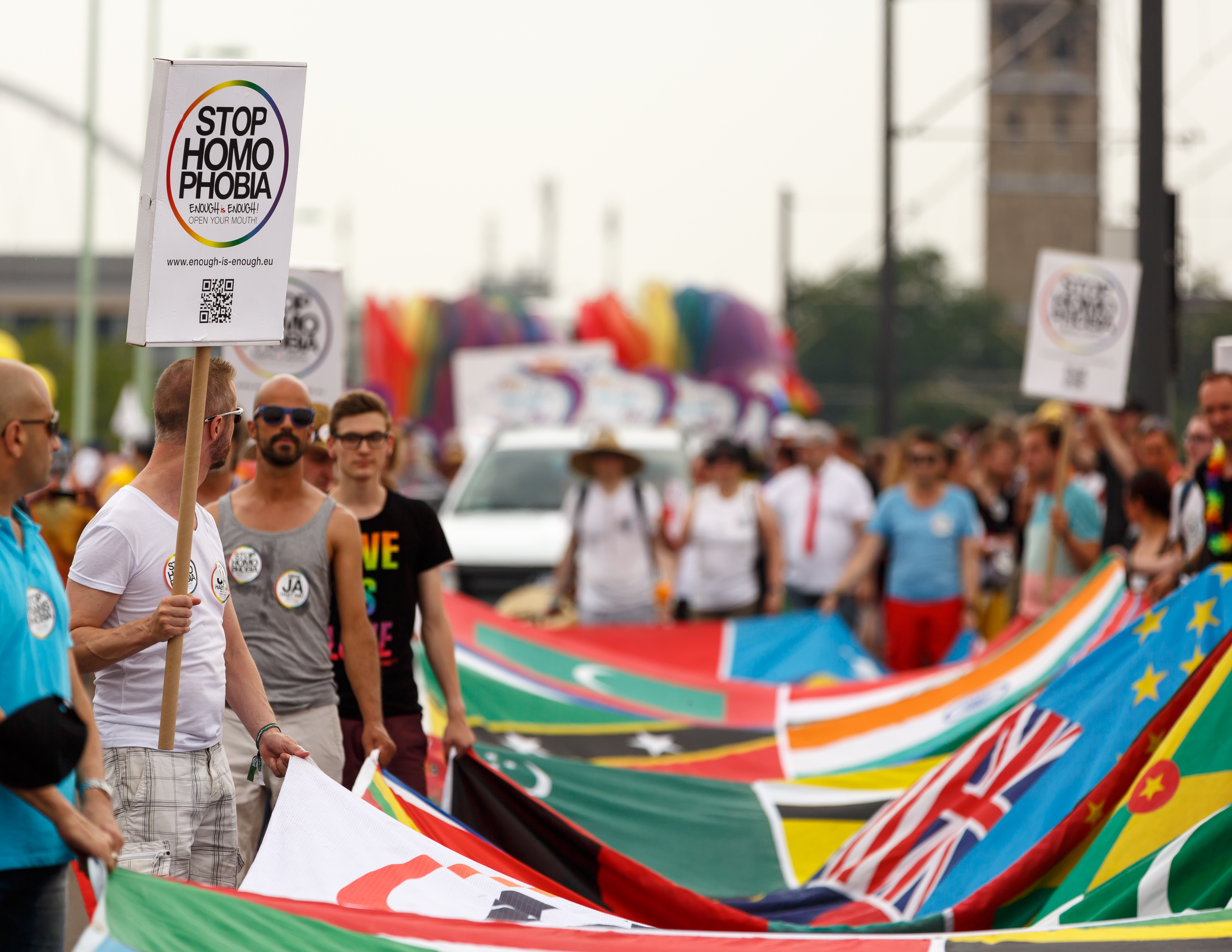
LGBT activists at Cologne Pride carrying a banner with the flags of over 70 countries where homosexuality is illegal

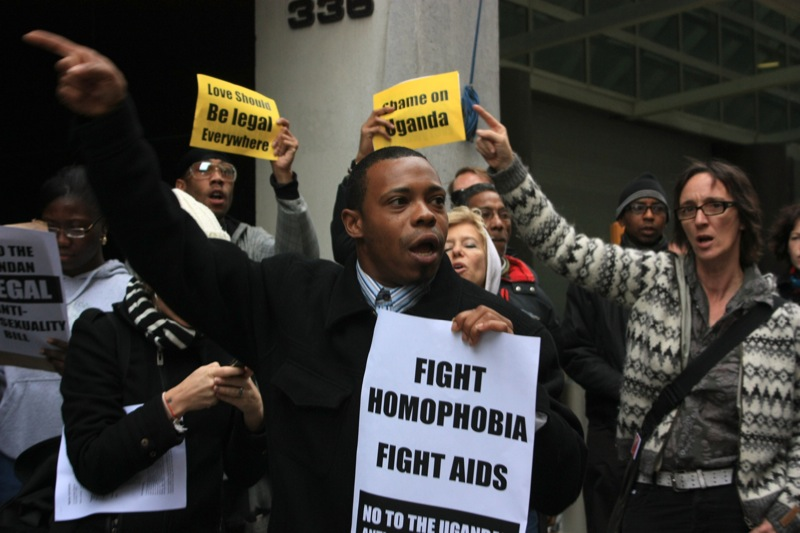
Protests in New York City against Uganda's Anti-Homosexuality Bill

One's sexual orientation is a "predilection for homosexuality, heterosexuality, or bisexuality". Like most minority groups, homosexuals and bisexuals are vulnerable to prejudice and discrimination from the majority group. They may experience hatred from others because of their sexuality; a term for such hatred based upon one's sexual orientation is often called homophobia. Many continue to hold negative feelings towards those with non-heterosexual orientations and will discriminate against people who have them or are thought to have them. People of other uncommon sexual orientations also experience discrimination. One study found its sample of heterosexuals to be more prejudiced against asexual people than against homosexual or bisexual people.

Employment discrimination based on sexual orientation varies by country. Revealing a lesbian sexual orientation (by means of mentioning an engagement in a rainbow organisation or by mentioning one's partner name) lowers employment opportunities in Cyprus and Greece but overall, it has no negative effect in Sweden and Belgium. In the latter country, even a positive effect of revealing a lesbian sexual orientation is found for women at their fertile ages.

Besides these academic studies, in 2009, ILGA published a report based on research carried out by Daniel Ottosson at Södertörn University College in Stockholm, Sweden. This research found that of the 80 countries around the world that continue to consider homosexuality illegal, five carry the death penalty for homosexual activity, and two do in some regions of the country. In the report, this is described as "State sponsored homophobia". This happens in Islamic states, or in two cases regions under Islamic authority. On February 5, 2005, the IRIN issued a reported titled "Iraq: Male homosexuality still a taboo". The article stated, among other things that honor killings by Iraqis against a gay family member are common and given some legal protection. In August 2009, Human Rights Watch published an extensive report detailing torture of men accused of being gay in Iraq, including the blocking of men's anuses with glue and then giving the men laxatives. Although gay marriage has been legal in South Africa since 2006, same-sex unions are often condemned as "un-African". Research conducted in 2009 shows 86% of black lesbians from the Western Cape live in fear of sexual assault.

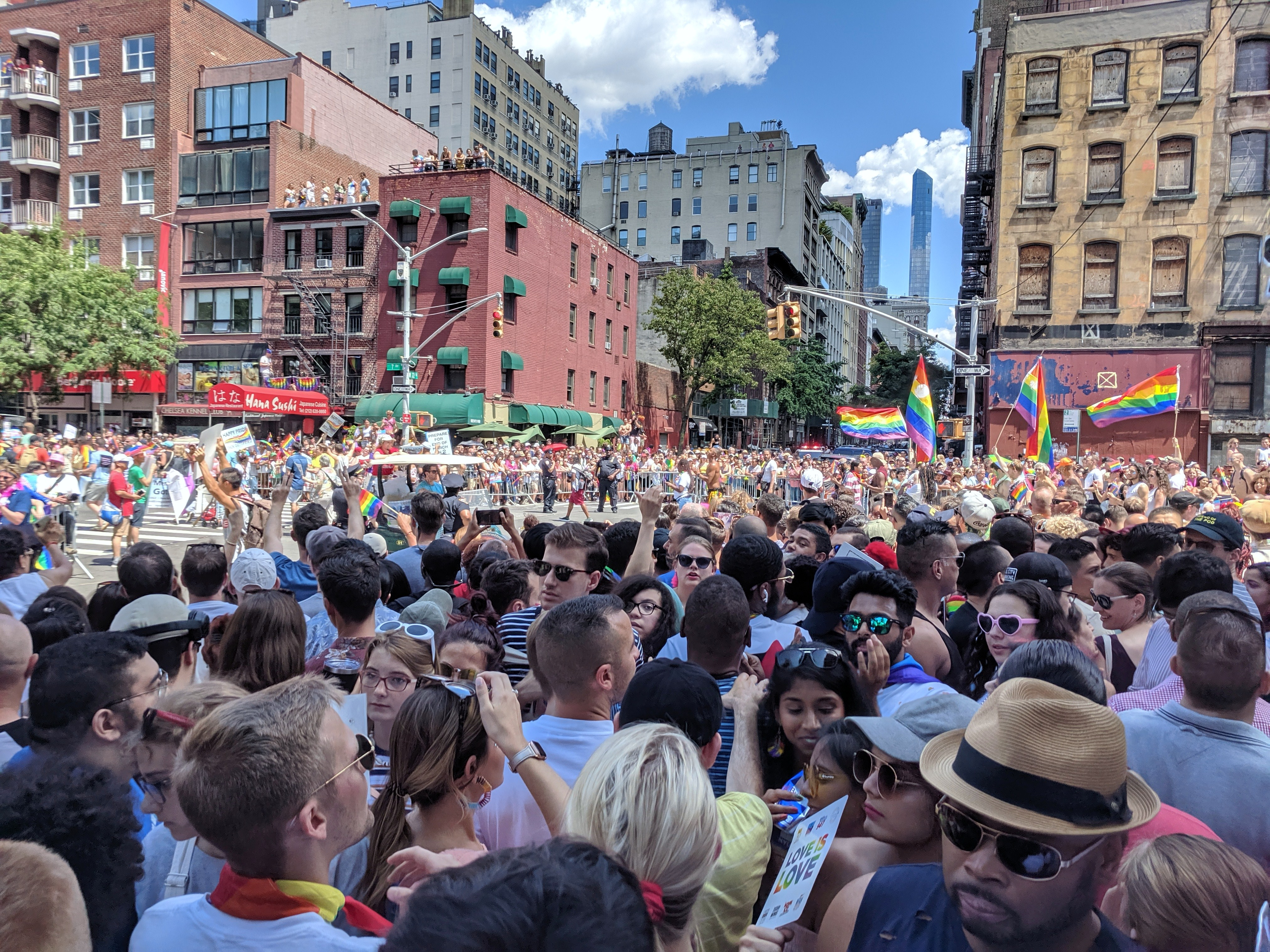
The NYC Pride March is the world's largest LGBT event. Regional variation exists with respect to tolerance, the antithesis of discrimination, in different parts of the world.

A number of countries, especially those in the Western world, have passed measures to alleviate discrimination against sexual minorities, including laws against anti-gay hate crimes and workplace discrimination. Some have also legalized same-sex marriage or civil unions in order to grant same-sex couples the same protections and benefits as opposite-sex couples. In 2011, the United Nations passed its first resolution recognizing LGBT rights.

=== Reverse discrimination ===
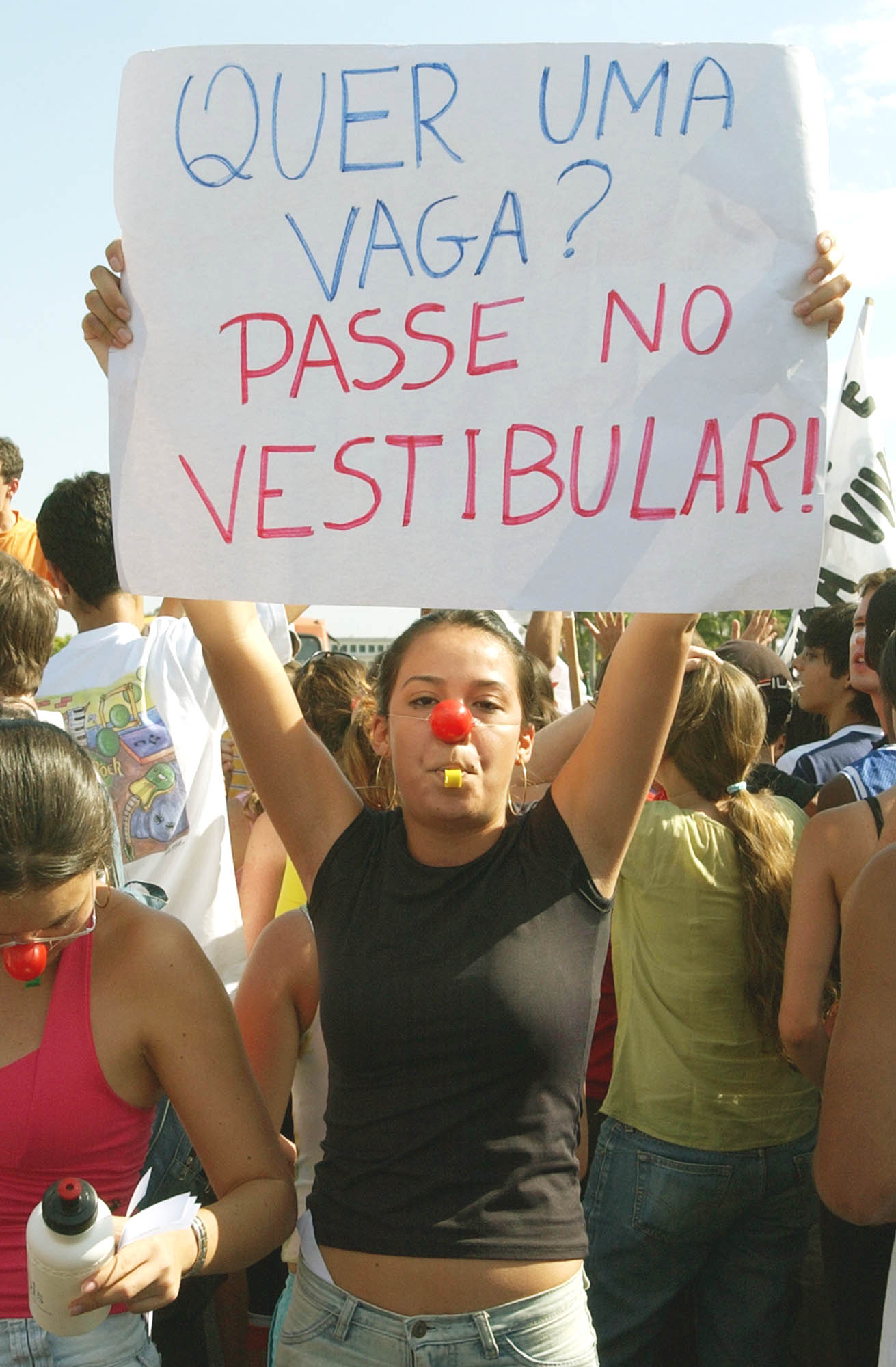
Students protesting against racial quotas in Brazil: "Quer uma vaga? Passe no vestibular!" ("Do you want a spot? Pass the entrance exam!")

Reverse discrimination is discrimination against members of a dominant or majority group, in favor of members of a minority or historically disadvantaged group.

This discrimination may seek to redress social inequalities under which minority groups have had less access to privileges enjoyed by the majority group. In such cases it is intended to remove discrimination that minority groups may already face. Reverse discrimination can be defined as the unequal treatment of members of the majority groups resulting from preferential policies, as in college admissions or employment, intended to remedy earlier discrimination against minorities.

Conceptualizing affirmative action as reverse discrimination became popular in the early- to mid-1970s, a time period that focused on under-representation and action policies intended to remedy the effects of past discrimination in both government and the business world.

== Anti-discrimination laws ==
=== Australia ===
- Racial Discrimination Act 1975
- Sex Discrimination Act 1984
- Disability Discrimination Act 1992
- Age Discrimination Act 2004

=== Canada ===
- Ontario Human Rights Code 1962
- Canadian Human Rights Act 1977

=== Hong Kong ===
- Sex Discrimination Ordinance (1996)

=== India ===
Article 15 of the Constitution of India prohibits discrimination against any citizen on grounds of caste, religion, sex, race or place of birth etc. Similarly, the Constitution of India guarantees several rights to all citizens irrespective of gender, such as right to equality under Article 14, right to life and personal liberty under Article 21.

Indian Penal Code, 1860 (Section 153 A) – Criminalises the use of language that promotes discrimination or violence against people on the basis of race, caste, sex, place of birth, religion, gender identity, sexual orientation or any other category.

=== Israel ===
- Prohibition of Discrimination in Products, Services and Entry into Places of Entertainment and Public Places Law, 2000
- Employment (Equal Opportunities) Law, 1988
- Law of Equal Rights for Persons with Disabilities, 1998

=== Netherlands ===
- Article 137c, part 1 of Wetboek van Strafrecht prohibits insults towards a group because of its race, religion, sexual orientation (straight or gay), handicap (somatically, mental or psychiatric) in public or by speech, by writing or by a picture. Maximum imprisonment one year of imprisonment or a fine of the third category.
- Part 2 increases the maximum imprisonment to two years and the maximum fine category to 4, when the crime is committed as a habit or is committed by two or more persons.
- Article 137d prohibits provoking to discrimination or hate against the group described above. Same penalties apply as in article 137c.
- Article 137e part 1 prohibits publishing a discriminatory statement, other than in formal message, or hands over an object (that contains discriminatory information) otherwise than on his request. Maximum imprisonment is 6 months or a fine of the third category.
- Part 2 increases the maximum imprisonment to one year and the maximum fine category to 4, when the crime is committed as a habit or committed by two or more persons.
- Article 137f prohibits supporting discriminatory activities by giving money or goods. Maximum imprisonment is 3 months or a fine of the second category.

=== Philippines ===
- 1987 Philippine Constitution – Guarantees equal protection under the law and prohibits discrimination based on sex, religion, race, and other status.
- Labor Code of the Philippines (Presidential Decree No. 442, 1974) – Prohibits unfair treatment in employment based on sex, race, creed, and promotes merit-based employment decisions.
- Magna Carta for Persons with Disability (RA 7277, 1992) – Prohibits discrimination against persons with disabilities in employment, education, and access to public services.
- Anti-Sexual Harassment Act (RA 7877, 1995) – Prohibits sexual harassment in workplaces, schools, and training environments as a form of discrimination.
- Anti-Age Discrimination in Employment Act (RA 10911, 2016) – Prohibits discrimination in employment based on age, including hiring, promotion, and compensation.
- Magna Carta of Women (RA 9710, 2009) – Provides comprehensive protection against gender-based discrimination and promotes women's rights.
- Safe Spaces Act (RA 11313, 2019) – Prohibits gender-based harassment, sexist remarks, and homophobic remarks, including discrimination in public spaces and online.
- Solo Parents' Welfare Act (RA 8972, 2000) – Protects solo parents from discrimination in employment and social services.
- Mental Health Act (RA 11036, 2018) – Prohibits discrimination against persons with mental health conditions in employment, education, and access to services.
- Proposed SOGIE Equality Bill (as of 2025) – Seeks to prohibit discrimination based on sexual orientation, gender identity, and expression in employment, education, healthcare, and public services.

=== United Kingdom ===
- Equal Pay Act 1970 – provides for equal pay for comparable work.
- Sex Discrimination Act 1975 – makes discrimination against women or men, including discrimination on the grounds of marital status, illegal in the workplace.
- Human Rights Act 1998 – provides more scope for redressing all forms of discriminatory imbalances.
- Equality Act 2010 – consolidates, updates and supplements the prior Acts and Regulations that formed the basis of anti-discrimination law.

=== United States ===
- Equal Pay Act of 1963 – (part of the Fair Labor Standards Act) – prohibits wage discrimination by employers and labor organizations based on sex.
- Civil Rights Act of 1964 – many provisions, including broadly prohibiting discrimination in the workplace including hiring, firing, workforce reduction, benefits, and sexually harassing conduct.
- Fair Housing Act of 1968 prohibited discrimination in the sale or rental of housing based on race, color, national origin, religion, sex, familial status, or disability. The Office of Fair Housing and Equal Opportunity is charged with administering and enforcing the Act.
- Pregnancy Discrimination Act of 1978, which amended Title VII of the Civil Rights Act of 1964 – covers discrimination based upon pregnancy in the workplace.
- Americans With Disabilities Act of 1990 prohibits discrimination based on disability and requires accessibility in public accommodations.
- Violence Against Women Act of 1994
- Many states have anti-discrimination laws, such as Florida's civil rights laws found in State Statute 760.

=== United Nations documents ===
Important UN documents addressing discrimination include:

- The Universal Declaration of Human Rights is a declaration adopted by the United Nations General Assembly on December 10, 1948. It states that:" Everyone is entitled to all the rights and freedoms set forth in this Declaration, without distinction of any kind, such as race, colour, sex, language, religion, political or other opinion, national or social origin, property, birth or other status."
- The International Convention on the Elimination of All Forms of Racial Discrimination (ICERD) is a United Nations convention. The Convention commits its members to the elimination of racial discrimination. The convention was adopted and opened for signature by the United Nations General Assembly on December 21, 1965, and entered into force on January 4, 1969.
- The Convention on the Elimination of All Forms of Discrimination against Women (CEDAW) is an international treaty adopted in 1979 by the United Nations General Assembly. Described as an international bill of rights for women, it came into force on September 3, 1981.
- The Convention on the Rights of Persons with Disabilities is an international human rights instrument treaty of the United Nations. Parties to the convention are required to promote, protect, and ensure the full enjoyment of human rights by persons with disabilities and ensure that they enjoy full equality under the law. The text was adopted by the United Nations General Assembly on December 13, 2006, and opened for signature on March 30, 2007. Following ratification by the 20th party, it came into force on May 3, 2008.

=== Exemptions ===
The Anti-discrimination laws of most countries allow and make exceptions for discrimination based on nationality and immigration status. The International Convention on the Elimination of All Forms of Racial Discrimination (CERD) does not prohibit discrimination by nationality, citizenship or naturalization but forbids discrimination "against any particular nationality".

== International cooperation ==
- Global Forum against Racism and Discrimination
- The International Coalition of Inclusive and Sustainable Cities (ICCAR) launched by UNESCO in 2004
- Routes of Enslaved Peoples project

== Theories and philosophy ==
Social theories such as egalitarianism assert that social equality should prevail. In some societies, including most developed countries, each individual's civil rights include the right to be free from government sponsored social discrimination. Due to a belief in the capacity to perceive pain or suffering shared by all animals, abolitionist or vegan egalitarianism maintains that the interests of every individual (regardless of their species), warrant equal consideration with the interests of humans, and that not doing so is speciesist.

Philosophers have debated as to how inclusive the definition of discrimination should be. Some philosophers have argued that discrimination should only refer to wrongful or disadvantageous treatment in the context of a socially salient group (such as race, gender, sexuality etc.) within a given context. Under this view, failure to limit the concept of discrimination would lead to it being overinclusive; for example, since most murders occur because of some perceived difference between the perpetrator and the victim, many murders would constitute discrimination if the social salience requirement is not included. Thus this view argues that making the definition of discrimination overinclusive renders it meaningless. Conversely, other philosophers argue that discrimination should simply refer to wrongful disadvantageous treatment regardless of the social salience of the group, arguing that limiting the concept only to socially salient groups is arbitrary, as well as raising issues of determining which groups would count as socially salient. The issue of which groups should count has caused many political and social debates.

Based on realistic-conflict theory and social-identity theory, Rubin and Hewstone have highlighted a distinction among three types of discrimination:

1. Realistic competition is driven by self-interest and is aimed at obtaining material resources (e.g., food, territory, customers) for the in-group (e.g., favoring an in-group in order to obtain more resources for its members, including the self).
2. Social competition is driven by the need for self-esteem and is aimed at achieving a positive social status for the in-group relative to comparable out-groups (e.g., favoring an in-group in order to make it better than an out-group).
3. Consensual discrimination is driven by the need for accuracy and reflects stable and legitimate intergroup status hierarchies (e.g., favoring a high-status in-group because it is high status).

=== Labeling theory ===
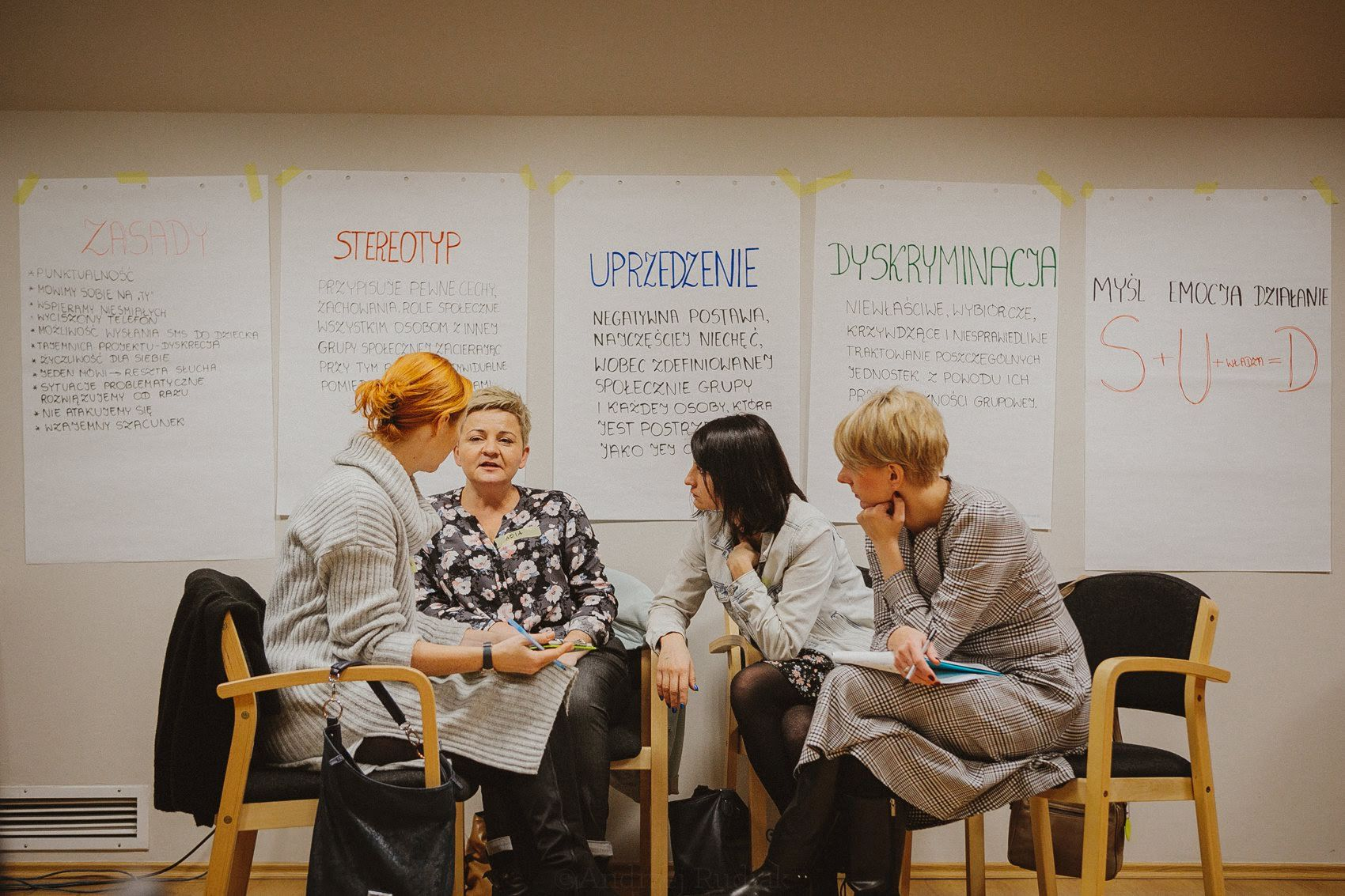
An anti-discrimination education workshop at the Auschwitz Jewish Center, Poland, 2019

Discrimination, in labeling theory, takes form as mental categorization of minorities and the use of stereotype. This theory describes difference as deviance from the norm, which results in internal devaluation and social stigma that may be seen as discrimination. It is started by describing a "natural" social order. It is distinguished between the fundamental principle of fascism and social democracy. The Nazis in 1930s-era Germany and the pre-1990 Apartheid government of South Africa used racially discriminatory agendas for their political ends. This practice continues with some present day governments.

=== Game theory ===
Economist Yanis Varoufakis (2013) argues that "discrimination based on utterly arbitrary characteristics evolves quickly and systematically in the experimental laboratory", and that neither classical game theory nor neoclassical economics can explain this.

In 2002, Varoufakis and Shaun Hargreaves-Heap ran an experiment where volunteers played a computer-mediated, multiround hawk-dove game. At the start of each session, each participant was assigned a color at random, either red or blue. At each round, each player learned the color assigned to his or her opponent, but nothing else about the opponent. Hargreaves-Heap and Varoufakis found that the players' behavior within a session frequently developed a discriminatory convention, giving a Nash equilibrium where players of one color (the "advantaged" color) consistently played the aggressive "hawk" strategy against players of the other, "disadvantaged" color, who played the acquiescent "dove" strategy against the advantaged color. Players of both colors used a mixed strategy when playing against players assigned the same color as their own. The experimenters then added a cooperation option to the game, and found that disadvantaged players usually cooperated with each other, while advantaged players usually did not. They state that while the equilibria reached in the original hawk-dove game are predicted by evolutionary game theory, game theory does not explain the emergence of cooperation in the disadvantaged group. Citing earlier psychological work of Matthew Rabin, they hypothesize that a norm of differing entitlements emerges across the two groups, and that this norm could define a "fairness" equilibrium within the disadvantaged group.

== Effects on health ==
The psychological impact of discrimination on health refers to the cognitive pathways through which discrimination impacts mental and physical health in marginalized, and lower-status groups (e.g. racial and sexual minorities). Research on the relationship between discrimination and health grew in the 1990s, when researchers proposed that persisting racial/ethnic disparities in health outcomes could be explained by racial or ethnic differences in experiences with discrimination. While much research focuses on the interactions between interpersonal discrimination and health, researchers studying discrimination and health in the United States have proposed that institutional discrimination and cultural racism also create conditions that contribute to persisting racial and economic health disparities.

A stress and coping framework is applied to investigate how discrimination influences health outcomes in racial, gender, and sexual minorities, as well as on immigrant and indigenous populations. The research indicates that experiences of discrimination are associated with worse physical and mental health conditions and lead to increased participation in unhealthy behaviors. Evidence of the inverse link between discrimination and health has been observed consistently across multiple population groups and various cultural and national contexts. Such observations have been studied and organized into theoretical frameworks in the field of public health to work towards understanding and achieving health equity.

Analysis of data from the UK Household Longitudinal Study has shown a link between disability discrimination and wellbeing. 13.4% of disabled people have felt discriminated against. Larger European studies have found disability discrimination to be very common. Disability discrimination was associated with lower wellbeing, for example depression, self rated health, psychological distress and life satisfaction.

== See also ==
- Algorithmic bias – Technological phenomenon with social implications
- Class discrimination – Discrimination on the basis of social class
- Classicide – Intentional destruction of a social class
- Cultural appropriation – Adoption of culture and cultural identity perceived as inappropriate
- Cultural assimilation – Adoption of features of another culture
- Cultural genocide – Genocide involving destruction of culture
- Dehumanization – Behavior or process that undermines individuality of and in others
- Dignity – Person's right to be valued, respected and treated ethically
- Discrimination against asexual people
- Discrimination against atheists – Discrimination based on lack of religious belief
- Discrimination against drug addicts
- Discrimination against members of the armed forces in the United Kingdom
- Discrimination against people with HIV/AIDS
- Discrimination based on skin color
- Economic discrimination – Discrimination based on economic factors
- Equal opportunity – Aspect of social equality
- Equal rights – Judicial principle
- Normalization of antisemitism
