= Anti-discrimination law =

Legislation designed to prevent discrimination against particular groups of people

Anti-discrimination laws (also known as non-discrimination laws) are designed to prevent discrimination against particular groups of people; these groups are often referred to as protected groups or protected classes.

Although prohibited types of discrimination and protected groups vary by jurisdiction, such legislation usually aims to prevent discrimination in employment, housing, education, and other areas of social life, such as public accommodations. Anti-discrimination law may protect groups based on sex, age, race, ethnicity, nationality, disability, mental illness or ability, sexual orientation, gender, gender identity/expression, sex characteristics, religion, creed, or individual political opinions.

Anti-discrimination laws are rooted in principles of equality, specifically, that individuals are designed not to be treated differently due to the characteristics outlined above. At the same time, they have often been criticised as violations of the inherent right of free association. Anti-discrimination laws are designed to protect against both individual discrimination (committed by individuals) and from structural discrimination (arising from policies or procedures that disadvantage certain groups). Courts may take into account both discriminatory intent, disparate treatment and disparate impact in determining whether a particular action or policy constitutes discrimination.

== International law ==
Equality has been described as the foundational principle of international human rights law. Promoting equality and combating discrimination has been described as a one of the main objectives of the United Nations, and non-discrimination is one of two rights mentioned in the UN Charter. Since the UN's founding, various UN committees has been tasked with reducing discrimination on various grounds, including sex, race, language, nationality, and religion.

The Universal Declaration of Human Rights proclaim that everyone is entitled to the rights it mentions "without distinction of any kind" and expressly provides equality before the law, the right to marry and divorce, and equal compensation for labor without distinction based on certain protected characteristics. While the declaration is not binding, nations make a commitment to uphold those rights through the ratification of international human rights treaties.

In addition to the Universal Declaration of Human Rights, other human rights treaties include non-discrimination rights in specific social settings or for specific groups.

=== Definition of discrimination ===
Human rights treaties define discrimination differently.

The International Covenant on Civil and Political Rights (ICCPR) does not define discrimination. The UN Human Rights Committee has create its own definition, drawing on the definitions in Convention on the Elimination of All Forms of Discrimination Against Women (CEDAW) and the International Convention on the Elimination of All Forms of Racial Discrimination (ICERD). Discrimination is defined as "distinction, exclusion, restriction or preference" on any ground or status that can impair a person's enjoyment of freedoms on "equal footing". Enjoying rights on equal footing does not imply identical treatment every time.

The International Covenant on Economic, Social and Cultural Rights (ICESCR) explicitly defines discrimination as differential treatment based on certain grounds, including harassment and incitement to discriminate. The discrimination could be direct, where there is intention to discriminate, or indirect, where the treatment appears neutral on the outset but has disproportionate impact on a protected group.

== History of anti-discrimination legislation ==
=== Australia ===
The Racial Discrimination Act 1975 was the first major anti-discrimination legislation passed in Australia, aimed at prohibiting discrimination based on race, ethnicity, or national origin. Jurisdictions within Australia moved shortly after to prohibit discrimination on the basis of sex, through acts including the Equal Opportunity Act 1977 and the Anti-Discrimination Act 1977. The Australian parliament expanded these protections with the Sex Discrimination Act 1984 (SDA) to cover all Australians and provide protections based on sex, relationship status, and pregnancy. Additionally, the SDA has been expanded to include gender identity and intersex status as protected groups. Discrimination based on disability status is also prohibited by the Disability Discrimination Act 1992.

=== Belgium ===
The first Belgian anti-discrimination law of 25 February 2003 was annulled by the Belgian Constitutional Court. The Court ruled that the law was discriminative since its scope did not include discrimination on the basis of a political opinion or language and thus violated the articles 10-11 of the Belgian Constitution, instituting the principle of equality before law.

A new law came into force on the 9th of June 2007. This law prohibits any use of direct or indirect discrimination on the basis of age, sexual preference, marital status, birth, wealth, religion or belief, political or syndical opinion, language, current or future state of health, disability, physical or genetical property or social origin.

=== Philippines ===
The Philippines has a long history of establishing laws to protect individuals from discrimination and ensure equality before the law. The Labor Code of the Philippines (Presidential Decree No. 442, 1974) enforces equality in the workplace, prohibiting discrimination based on sex, race, or creed (Article 3). Gender-based wage discrimination is also prohibited (Article 133), ensuring men and women receive equal pay for work of equal value. The 1987 Philippine Constitution provides the foundational framework, guaranteeing that all persons shall have the right to equal protection of the laws (Article III, Section 1). Subsequent legislation has addressed discrimination on the basis of gender, age, disability, mental health, social status, and sexual orientation.

One of the earliest comprehensive anti-discrimination laws was the Magna Carta for Persons with Disability (Republic Act No. 7277), enacted in 1992. This law safeguards persons with disabilities from unfair treatment, particularly in employment, education, transportation, health, and access to public services. It mandates the removal of barriers and the provision of equal opportunities for full participation in society. The Anti-Sexual Harassment Act of 1995 (Republic Act 7877) considers it discriminatory when a sexual favor is required as a condition for hiring, continued employment, promotion, or receiving benefits (Section 3). Employees who refuse such demands cannot be unfairly treated, deprived of opportunities, or subjected to adverse employment actions. In 2000, the Solo Parents' Welfare Act (Republic Act 8972) was enacted in 2000. It safeguards solo parents from employment discrimination (Section 7).

The Magna Carta of Women (Republic Act 9710), enacted in 2009, explicitly prohibits discrimination against women in all forms (Section 2). It provides women with equal access to education, employment, political participation, healthcare, and social services. In 2016, the Anti-Age Discrimination in Employment Act (Republic Act 10911) was enacted to protect workers from workplace prejudice based on age. It prohibits employers from imposing age-based hiring restrictions or terminating employees solely due to age (Section 5). The Mental Health Act (Republic Act 11036), enacted in 2018, protects individuals with mental health conditions from stigma and discrimination (Section 2). It guarantees access to mental health services and encourages the full social and occupational participation of affected persons. The Safe Spaces Act (Republic Act 11313), enacted in 2019, protects individuals from gender-based harassment in workplaces, educational institutions, public spaces, and online. It prohibits discrimination, harassment, and offensive remarks based on sex, gender, sexual orientation, or gender identity, including sexist and homophobic remarks. Based on the Implementing Rules and Regulations of Republic Act 11313, sexist remarks or slurs are statements that reflect prejudice, stereotyping, or discrimination based on sex, typically targeting women.

The SOGIESC (Sexual Orientation, Gender Identity, Gender Expression, and Sex Characteristics) Equality Act, also known as SOGIE Equality Bill, is a pending legislation designed to explicitly prohibit discrimination against LGBTQIA+ persons. The proposed law aims to prevent marginalization, harassment, and unequal treatment in employment, education, health services, and public accommodations. Its passage would strengthen legal protections for sexual and gender minorities, aligning national law with the constitutional guarantee of equality. The first version of SOGIE Equality Bill was filed in 2000, introduced by Miriam Defensor‑Santiago (Senate) and Etta Rosales (House) during the 11th Philippine Congress. As of 2025, the SOGIE Equality Bill remains unpassed, with the last recorded major procedural move on March 19, 2024, when the House committees on Women and Gender Equality and Appropriations submitted Committee Report No. 1035 recommending the bill as a substitute for multiple House bills.

=== European Union ===
The European Union has passed several major anti-discrimination directives, the Racial Equality Directive and the Employment Equality Directive, and the Equal Treatment Directive. These directives set standards for all member countries of the European Union to meet; however each member state is responsible for creating specific legislation to achieve those goals. The Court of Justice of the European Union interprets the European Union anti-discrimination law as substantive equality with equality of outcome for subgroups.

All EU member states are also member states to the European Convention on Human Rights. Thus, article 14 of the Convention applies, which concerns a prohibition on discrimination on the ground of sex, race, colour, language, religion, political or other opinion, national or social origin, association with a national minority, property, birth or other status.

=== United Kingdom ===
Laws forbidding discrimination in housing, public facilities and employment were first introduced in the 1960s covering race and ethnicity under the Race Relations Act 1965 and the Race Relations Act 1968.

In the 1970s, anti-discrimination law was significantly expanded. The Equal Pay Act 1970 allowed women to bring action against their employer if they could show that they were being paid less compared to a male colleague for equal work or work of the same value. The Sex Discrimination Act 1975 forbade both direct and indirect discrimination on the basis of sex, and the Race Relations Act 1976 expanded the scope of anti-discrimination law on the basis of race and ethnicity.

In the 1990s, protections against discrimination on the basis of disability was added primarily through the Disability Discrimination Act 1995.

In the 2000s, the scope of employment anti-discrimination laws were expanded to cover sexual orientation (with the passage of the Employment Equality (Sexual Orientation) Regulations 2003), age (the Employment Equality (Age) Regulations 2006), and religion/belief (Employment Equality (Religion or Belief) Regulations 2003).

In 2010, existing anti-discrimination law was combined into a single Act of Parliament, the Equality Act 2010. The Equality Act contains provisions forbidding direct, indirect, perceptive and associative discrimination on the basis of sex, race, ethnicity, religion and belief, age, disability, sexual orientation and gender reassignment. Employment law also protects employees from worse treatment based on being part-time workers, agency workers or being on fixed-term contracts.

=== United States ===
In 1868 after the American Civil War, the Fourteenth Amendment to the United States Constitution was ratified, including the Equal Protection Clause. It was an effort by John Bingham and other Radical Republicans to protect formerly-enslaved people from discrimination. Nevertheless, the promises of this and other Reconstruction Amendments went largely unfulfilled for nearly a century due to the profusion of racist Jim Crow laws designed to oppress persons of color and reinforce racial segregation in the United States. The Civil Rights Act of 1964 was the next major development in anti-discrimination law in the US, though prior civil rights legislation (such as the Civil Rights Act of 1957) addressed some forms of discrimination, the Civil Rights Act of 1964 was much broader, providing protections for race, colour, religion, sex, or national origin in the areas of voting, education, employment, and public accommodations. This landmark legislation led the way for other federal legislation, which expanded upon the protected classes and forms of discrimination prohibited under federal legislation, such as the Fair Housing Act or the Americans with Disabilities Act. These protections have also been expanded through the courts interpretation of these pieces of legislation. For example, the U.S. Courts of Appeals for the Seventh and Second Circuits, and later the U.S. Supreme Court in Bostock v. Clayton County, ruled that employment discrimination based on sexual orientation is a violation of Title VII of the Civil Rights Act. In addition to federal legislation, there are numerous state and local laws that address discrimination that is not covered by these laws.

== Effects ==
=== United States ===
==== Americans with Disabilities Act of 1990 ====
Employment rates for all disabled men and disabled women under 40 have decreased since the implementation of the ADA. This effect is especially pronounced for those with mental disabilities and for those with lower levels of education. However, there is evidence to suggest that the decrease in employment rates is partially explained by increased participation in educational opportunities. These decreases can be attributed to increased costs for employers to remain in compliance with ADA provisions; rather than bearing increased costs, companies hire fewer workers with disabilities. While popular conception is that the ADA has created the opportunity for legal recourse for those with disabilities, less than 10% of ADA related cases find in favor of the plaintiff.

==== Prior to 1960 ====
David Neumark and Wendy Stock found evidence that sex discrimination/equal pay laws boosted the relative earnings of black and white females and conversely reduced the relative employment of both black women and white women.

== Exceptions ==
Where anti-discrimination legislation is in force, exceptions are sometimes included in the laws.

=== Citizenship ===
The International Convention on the Elimination of All Forms of Racial Discrimination has an exception which allows discrimination based on nationality, citizenship or naturalization.

=== Military ===
In many nations with anti-discrimination legislation, women are excluded from holding certain positions in the military, such as serving in a frontline combat capacity or aboard submarines. The reason given varies; for example, the British Royal Navy cite the reason for not allowing women to serve aboard submarines as medical and related to the safety of an unborn foetus, rather than that of combat effectiveness.

=== Religious organizations ===
Some religious organizations are exempted from legislation. For example, in Britain the Church of England, in common with other religious institutions, has historically not allowed women to hold senior positions (bishoprics) despite sex discrimination in employment generally being illegal; the prohibition was confirmed by a vote by the Church synod in 2012.

Selection of teachers and pupils in schools for general education but with a religious affiliation is often permitted by law to be restricted to those of the same religious affiliation even where religious discrimination is forbidden.

== See also ==
- Anti-discrimination laws in Brazil
- Clothing laws by country
- Discrimination (Employment and Occupation) Convention (ILO Convention No. 111)
- Employment discrimination law in the United Kingdom
- Employment discrimination law in the United States
- Employment equity (Canada)
- Freedom of expression
- History of women in the military
- Labour law
- LGBT rights by country or territory
- List of anti-discrimination acts
- Public accommodations
- Reasonable accommodation
- Reverse discrimination
- Right to personal identity
