= List of executive orders by Rodrigo Duterte =

Philippine presidents issue executive orders to assist officers and agencies of the executive branch manage the operations within the government. Below is a list of executive orders signed by Philippine President Rodrigo Duterte.

== Executive orders ==
=== 2016 ===
| No. | Title / Description | Date signed | Ref. |
|---|---|---|---|
| 1 | Reengineering the Office of the President Towards Greater Responsiveness to the Attainment of Development Goals | June 30, 2016 | |
| 2 | Operationalizing in the Executive Branch the People's Constitutional Right to Information and the State Policies to Full Public Disclosure and Transparency in the Public Service and. Providing Guidelines Therefor | July 23, 2016 | |
| 3 | Increasing the Rates of Combat Duty Pay and Combat Incentive Pay of the Armed Forces of the Philippines and Extending the Same Allowances to the Uniformed Personnel of the Philippine National Police, Amending Therefor Executive Order No. 38 (s. 2011) | September 26, 2016 | |
| 4 | Providing for the Establishment and Support of Drug Abuse Treatment and Rehabilitation Centers Throughout the Philippines | October 11, 2016 | |
| 5 | Approving and Adopting the Twenty-Five-Year Long Term Vision Entitled Ambisyon Natin 2040 as Guide for Development Planning | October 11, 2016 | |
| 6 | Institutionalizing the 8888 Citizens' Complaint Hotline and Establishing the 8888 Citizen's Complaint Center | October 14, 2016 | |
| 7 | Amending Executive Order No. 43 (s. 2011) Entitled "Pursuing Our Social Contract With the Filipino People through the Reorganization" to Designate the Department of National Defense Secretary as the Chairperson of the Security, Justice and Peace Cluster | October 14, 2016 | |
| 8 | Amending Further Executive Order No. 120 (s. 2012), as Amended by Executive Order No. 187 (s. 2015), on the Bangsamoro Transition Commission and for Other Purposes | November 8, 2016 | |
| 9 | Strengthening the Office of the Cabinet Secretary, Enhancing its Powers and Functions, Providing for its Support Staff and for Other Purposes | December 1, 2016 | |
| 10 | Creating a Consultative Committee to Review the 1987 Constitution | December 7, 2016 | |
| 11 | Extending Further the Term of South Cotabato/North Cotabato/Sultan Kudarat/ Sarangani/General Santos City (SOCSKSARGEN) Area Development Project Office (ADPO) to December 31, 2022, Amending for the Purpose Executive Order No. 507 (s. 2006), as Amended | December 29, 2016 | |

=== 2017 ===
| No. | Title / Description | Date signed | Ref. |
|---|---|---|---|
| 12 | Attaining and Sustaining Zero Unmet Need for Modern Family Planning Services through the Strict Implementation of the Responsible Parenthood and Reproductive Health Act, Providing Funds Therefore, and for Other Purposes | January 9, 2017 | |
| 13 | Strengthening the Fight Against Illegal Gambling and Clarifying the Jurisdiction and Authority of Concerned Agencies in the Regulation and Licensing of Gambling and Online Gaming Facilities, and for Other Purposes | February 2, 2017 | |
| 14 | Reverting the Clark International Airport Corporation as a Subsidiary of the Bases Conversion and Development Authority, and Maintaining the Policy Supervision and Operational Control of the Department of Transportation over the Clark International Airport | February 28, 2017 | |
| 15 | Creating the Inter-Agency Committee on Anti-Illegal Drugs (ICAD) and Anti-Illegal Drug Task Force to Suppress the Drug Problem in the Country | March 6, 2017 | |
| 16 | Directing All Government Departments and Agencies, Including Government-owned or -controlled Corporations and Local Government Units to Adopt the National Security Policy 2017 – 2022 in the Formulation and Implementation of Their National Security Related Plans and Programs | April 4, 2017 | |
| 17 | Creating the Order of Lapu-Lapu | April 7, 2017 | |
| 18 | Repealing Executive Order No. 235 (s. 2003), Streamlining the Rules and Procedures of Defense Contracts, and for Other Purposes | April 7, 2017 | |
| 19 | Reduction and Condonation of Real Property Taxes and Interests/Penalties Assessed on the Power Generation Facilities of Independent Power Producers Under Build-Operate Transfer Contracts With Government-owned or -controlled Corporations | April 27, 2017 | |
| 20 | Modifying the Nomenclature and Rates of Import Duty on Various Products Under Section 1611 of Republic Act No. 10863 Otherwise Known as the Customs Modernization and Tariff Act | April 27, 2017 | |
| 21 | Modifying the Nomenclature and the Rates of Import Duty on Certain Information Technology Products Under Section 1611 of the Customs Modernization and Tariff Act, in Order to Implement the Philippines' Tariff Commitments Under the World Trade Organization–Information Technology Agreement | April 27, 2017 | |
| 22 | Reducing the Rates of Duty on Capital Equipment, Spare Parts and Accessories Imported by Board of Investments–Registered New and Expanding Enterprises | April 28, 2017 | |
| 23 | Extending the Effectivity of the Most-Favoured-Nation Rates of Duty on Certain Agricultural Products Under Republic Act No. 10863, Otherwise Known as the Customs Modernization and Tariff Act, and the Other Philippine Commitments Under the World Trade Organization Decision on Waiver Relating to Special Treatment for Rice of the Philippines | April 28, 2017 | |
| 24 | Reorganizing the Cabinet Clusters System by Integrating Good Governance and Anti-Corruption in the Policy Frameworks of All Clusters and Creating the Infrastructure Cluster and Participatory Governance Cluster | May 16, 2017 | |
| 25 | Changing the Name of "Benham Rise" to "Philippine Rise" and for Other Purposes | May 16, 2017 | |
| 26 | Providing for the Establishment of Smoke-free Environments in Public and Enclosed Places | May 16, 2017 | |
| 27 | Directing All Government Agencies and Instrumentalities, Including Local Government Units, to Implement the Philippine Development Plan and Public Investment Program for the Period 2017–2022 | June 1, 2017 | |
| 28 | Providing for the Regulation and Control of the Use of Firecrackers and Other Pyrotechnic Devices | June 20, 2017 | |
| 29 | Renaming the National Disaster Consciousness Month to National Disaster Resilience Month and Shifting its Focus from Disaster Awareness Building to Disaster Resilience | June 28, 2017 | |
| 30 | Creating the Energy Investment Coordinating Council in Order to Streamline the Regulatory Procedures Affecting Energy Projects | June 28, 2017 | |
| 31 | Creating the Strategy, Economics, and Results Group in the Department of Finance | June 28, 2017 | |
| 32 | Inclusion of the Department of Transportation and the Department of Information and Communications Technology as Members of the National Disaster Risk Reduction and Management Council | July 12, 2017 | |
| 33 | Increasing the Employment Compensation Funeral Benefits for Employees in the Private and Public Sectors | July 17, 2017 | |
| 34 | Further Amending Executive Order No. 423 (s. 2005), as Amended, Prescribing the Rules and Procedures on the Review and Approval of all Government Contracts, Pursuant to Republic Act No. 9184, Otherwise Known as the Government Procurement Reform Act of 2003 | July 17, 2017 | |
| 35 | Amending Executive Order No. 17 (s. 2017) Creating the Order of Lapu-Lapu | July 28, 2017 | |
| 36 | Suspending the Compensation and Position Classification System Under Executive Order No. 203 (s. 2016), Providing for Interim Compensation Adjustments, and for Other Purposes | July 28, 2017 | |
| 37 | Adjusting the Dividend Rate of the National Development Company for its 2015 Net Earnings Pursuant to Section 5 of Republic Act No. 7656 | August 7, 2017 | |
| 38 | Revoking Executive Order No. 183 (s. 2015) which Created a Negros Island Region and for Other Purposes | August 7, 2017 | |
| 39 | Mandating the Secretary of Energy to Sit Ex Officio Chairman of the Board of Directors of PNOC Exploration Corporation and PNOC Renewables Corporation | September 5, 2017 | |
| 40 | Amending Executive Order No. 9 (S. 2016) for the Purpose of Strengthening the Functional Arrangements in the Office of the President | September 15, 2017 | |
| 41 | Reconstituting the Membership of the Local Water Utilities Administration Board of Trustees | September 15, 2017 | |
| 42 | Repealing Executive Order (EO) No. 340 (S. 2004) and Defining the Powers, Functions and Duties of the Board of Directors of the Subic Bay Metropolitan Authority (SBMA) and the SBMA Administrator | September 25, 2017 | |
| 43 | Creating the Presidential Anti-Corruption Commission and Providing for its Powers, Duties and Functions, and for Other Purposes | October 4, 2017 | |
| 44 | Approving the Acquisition of Philippine Postal Savings Bank by the Land Bank of the Philippines | September 28, 2017 | |
| 45 | Providing for the Reorganization of the Field Offices of the Office of Consular Affairs of the Department of Foreign Affairs | October 20, 2017 | |
| 46 | Reviving the Post Clearance Audit Function of the Bureau of Customs and Institutionalizing the Functions of the Financial Analytics and Intelligence Unit of the Department of Finance | October 20, 2017 | |
| 47 | Further Amending Executive Order No. 82 (s. 1999), as Amended, Institutionalizing the Legacy of the 1986 EDSA People Power Revolution | November 24, 2017 | |
| 48 | Adjusting the Dividend Rate of Selected Government-Owned Or -Controlled Corporations Pursuant to Section 5 of Republic Act No. 7656 | December 13, 2017 | |

=== 2018 ===
| No. | Title / Description | Date signed | Ref. |
|---|---|---|---|
| 49 | Exempting the National Housing Authority from the National Economic and Development Authority Guidelines on Joint Venture Agreements to Expedite the Implementation of Recovery, Reconstruction and Rehabilitation Projects in the Most Affected Areas of Marawi City | February 5, 2018 | |
| 50 | Approving the Micro, Small, and Medium Enterprise (MSME) Development Plan 2017–2022 and Directing Concerned Government Agencies and Instrumentalities, Including Government-Owned and -Controlled Corporations and Local Government Units, to Adopt and Implement the Plan | April 4, 2018 | |
| 51 | Implementing Article 106 of the Labor Code of the Philippines, as Amended, to Protect the Right to Security of Tenure of All Workers Based on Social Justice in the 1987 Philippine Constitution | May 1, 2018 | |
| 52 | Creating the Program Management Office for Earthquake Resiliency of the Greater Metro Manila Area | May 8, 2018 | |
| 53 | Creating a Boracay Inter-Agency Task Force, Providing for Its Powers and Functions and Those of the Member-Agencies Thereof, and Other Measures to Reverse the Degradation of Boracay Island | May 8, 2018 | |
| 54 | Increasing Employees' Compensation Benefits in the Private Sector and Carer's Allowance in the Public Sector | May 8, 2018 | |
| 55 | Constituting a Steering Committee for the Commemoration of the Quincentennial of the Arrival of Ferdinand Magellan in the Philippines, the Victory of Lapu-Lapu in the Battle of Mactan, and Other Historic Events That Happened from 1519 to 1522 | May 8, 2018 | |
| 56 | Institutionalizing the Emergency 911 Hotline as the Nationwide Emergency Answering Point, Replacing Patrol 117, and for Other Purposes | May 25, 2018 | |
| 57 | Reducing the Rates of Duty on Capital Equipment, Spare Parts and Accessories Imported by Board of Investments-Registered New and Expanding Enterprises | June 22, 2018 | |
| 58 | Approving the Merger of the Home Guaranty Corporation and the Philippine Export-Import Credit Agency (PHILEXIM), Transferring the Guarantee Functions, Programs and Funds of the Small Business Corporation, and the Administration of the Agricultural Guarantee Fund Pool and the Industrial Guarantee and Loan Fund to the PHILEXIM, and Renaming the PHILEXIM as the Philippine Guarantee Corporation | July 23, 2018 | |
| 59 | Adjusting the Dividend Rate of the Power Sector Assets and Liabilities Management Corporation Pursuant to Section 5 of Republic Act No. 7656 | July 25, 2018 | |
| 60 | Reduction and Condonation of Real Property Taxes and Interest/Penalties Assessed on the Power Generation Facilities of Independent Power Under Build-Operate-Transfer Contracts With Government-Owned or -Controlled Corporations | July 25, 2018 | |
| 61 | Modifying the Rates of Import Duty on Certain Imported Articles in Order to Implement the Philippine Tariff Commitments Pursuant to the Free Trade Agreement Between the European Free Trade Association States and the Philippines | August 2, 2018 | |
| 62 | Amending Executive Order No. 1 (s. 2016), Entitled Reengineering the Office of the President Towards Greater Responsiveness to the Attainment of Development Goals, and for Other Purposes | September 17, 2018 | |
| 63 | Further Strengthening the Authority of the Maritime Industry Authority as the Single Maritime Administration for the Purpose of Implementing the 1978 International Convention on Standards of Training, Certification and Watchkeeping for Seafarers, as Amended | September 21, 2018 | |
| 64 | Reviving Barter in Mindanao, Promoting Its Growth and Development, and Constituting the Mindanao Barter Council for the Purpose | October 29, 2018 | |
| 65 | Promulgating the Eleventh Regular Foreign Investment Negative List | October 29, 2018 | |
| 66 | Institutionalizing the Philippine Anti-Illegal Drugs Strategy | October 29, 2018 | |
| 67 | Rationalizing the Office of the President Through the Consolidation of Its Core Mandates and Strengthening the Democratic and Institutional Framework of the Executive Department | October 31, 2018 | |
| 68 | Adoption of the National Anti-Money Laundering and Countering the Financing of Terrorism (AML/CFT) Strategy and Creation of the National AML/CFT Coordinating Committee | November 12, 2018 | |
| 69 | Granting Financial Support to the Citizen Armed Force Geographical Unit Active Auxiliary Service | December 4, 2018 | |
| 70 | Institutionalizing the Whole-Of-Nation Approach in Attaining Inclusive and Sustainable Peace, Creating a National Task Force to End Local Communist Armed Conflict, and Directing the Adoption of a National Peace Framework | December 4, 2018 | |
| 71 | Renaming the Commission on Population as the Commission on Population and Development and Reverting Its Attachment to the National Economic and Development Authority from the Department of Health and for Other Purposes | December 13, 2018 | |
| 72 | Amending Executive Order No. 271 (s. 1995) Governing the Admission and Stay of Foreign Nationals in the Subic Bay Freeport Zone as Temporary Visitors | December 18, 2018 | |
| 73 | Amending Executive Order No. 43 (s. 2017) Creating the Presidential Anti-Corruption Commission | December 28, 2018 | |

=== 2019 ===
| No. | Title / Description | Date signed | Ref. |
|---|---|---|---|
| 74 | Repealing Executive Order (EO) No. 798 (s. 2009) and EO No. 146 (s. 2013), Transferring the Philippine Reclamation Authority (PRA) to the Office of the President (OP), Delegating to the PRA Governing Board the Power of the President to Approve Reclamation Projects, and for Other Purposes | February 1, 2019 | |
| 75 | Directing All Departments, Bureaus, Offices and Instrumentalities of the Government to Identify Lands Owned by the Government Devoted to or Suitable for Agriculture for Distribution to Qualified Beneficiaries | February 1, 2019 | |
| 76 | Amending Executive Order No. 201 (s. 2016), Entitled Modifying the Salary Schedule for Civilian Government Personnel and Authorizing the Grant of Additional Benefits for Both Civilian and Military and Uniformed Personnel | March 15, 2019 | |
| 77 | Prescribing Rules and Regulations and Rates of Expenses and Allowances for Official Local and Foreign Travels of Government Personnel | March 15, 2019 | |
| 78 | Transferring the Philippine Aerospace Development Corporation to the Department of National Defense | March 15, 2019 | |
| 79 | Implementing the Annex on Normalization Under the Comprehensive Agreement on the Bangsamoro | April 24, 2019 | |
| 80 | Rationalizing the Rules for the Engagement of Third Party Participants Under Petroleum Service Contracts, Repealing for the Purpose Executive Order No. 556 (s. 2006) | May 28, 2019 | |
| 81 | Reclassifying the Clark Industrial Estate 5 as an International Center of Commerce, Industry, Leisure and Recreation, and Amending Executive Order No. 716, Series of 2008, for This Purpose | June 4, 2019 | |
| 82 | Modifying the Nomenclature and Rates of Import Duty on Certain Agricultural Products Under Section 1611 of Republic Act No. 10863, Otherwise Known as the Customs Modernization and Tariff Act | June 13, 2019 | |
| 83 | Approving and Adopting the National Technical Education and Skills Development Plan 2018–2022 | June 17, 2019 | |
| 84 | Creation of an Inter-Agency Council on the International Maritime Organization Member State Audit Scheme | July 2, 2019 | |
| 85 | Reducing the Rates of Duty on Capital Equipment, Spare Parts and Accessories Imported by Board of Investments – Registered New and Expanding Enterprises | July 19, 2019 | |
| 86 | Amending Executive Order No. 24 (s. 2017), Entitled Reorganizing the Cabinet Clusters System by Integrating Good Governance and Anti-Corruption in the Policy Frameworks of All the Clusters and Creating the Infrastructure Cluster and Participatory Governance Cluster | July 25, 2019 | |
| 87 | Directing That All Accounts Payable Which Remain Outstanding for Two Years or More in the Books of National Government Agencies Be Reverted to the Accumulated Surplus or Deficit of the General Fund, or the Cumulative Result of Operations of the National Government | August 13, 2019 | |
| 88 | Reduction and Condonation of Real Property Taxes and Interest/Penalties Assessed on the Power Generation Facilities of Independent Power Producers Under Build-Operate-Transfer Contracts With Government-Owned Or-Controlled Corporations | August 13, 2019 | |
| 89 | Adjusting the Dividend Rate of Selected Government-Owned or -Controlled Corporations Pursuant to Section 5 of Republic Act No. 7656 | August 28, 2019 | |
| 90 | Further Amending Executive Order No. 54 (s. 1999), as Amended, by Transferring the Chairmanship of the Pasig River Rehabilitation Commission to the Department of Environment and Natural Resources, and for Other Purposes | August 28, 2019 | |
| 91 | Adopting the Cash Budgeting System Beginning Fiscal Year 2019, and for Other Purposes | September 9, 2019 | |
| 92 | Institutionalizing the National Council Against Child Labor to Upscale the Implementation of the Philippine Program Against Child Labor | September 17, 2019 | |
| 93 | Disestablishment of the Pasig River Rehabilitation Commission | November 8, 2019 | |
| 94 | Authorizing the Grant of Financial Support to the Citizen Armed Force Geographical Unit Active Auxiliary Service | November 8, 2019 | |
| 95 | Reorganizing the National Cybersecurity Inter-Agency Committee, Amending Executive Order No. 189 (s. 2015) and for Other Purposes | November 15, 2019 | |
| 96 | Establishing the Philippine Railways Institute Under the Department of Transportation as the Planning, Implementing and Regulatory Agency for Human Resources Development in the Railways Sector | November 28, 2019 | |
| 97 | Reorganizing the Presidential Commission on Visiting Forces, Thereby Amending Executive Order No. 175 (s. 2014) | November 29, 2019 | |
| 98 | Providing Guidelines on the Detail of Personnel of the Armed Forces of the Philippines and the Philippine National Police to Civilian Offices and Officials, and Repealing Executive Order Nos. 41 (s. 1966) and 207 (s. 2016) for the Purpose | November 29, 2019 | |
| 99 | Enjoining All Sangguniang Barangays to Establish a Yuletide Social Assistance Program for All Barangay Officials and Functionaries for Fiscal Year (FY) 2019 | December 6, 2019 | |
| 100 | Institutionalizing the Diversity and Inclusion Program, Creating an Inter-Agency Committee on Diversity and Inclusion, and for Other Purposes | December 19, 2019 | |

=== 2020 ===
| No. | Title / Description | Date signed | Ref. |
|---|---|---|---|
| 101 | Creating an Inter-Agency Task Force on Zero Hunger | January 10, 2020 | |
| 102 | Modifying the rates of import duty on certain imported articles in order to implement the Philippine Tariff Commitments pursuant to the Free Trade Agreement between the Association of Southeast Asian Nations (ASEAN) and Hong Kong, China | January 10, 2020 | |
| 103 | Reconstituting and Strengthening the National Quincentennial Committee, and amending Executive Order No. 55 (S. 2018) for the purpose | January 28, 2020 | |
| 104 | Improving access to Healthcare through the regulation of prices in the Retail of Drugs and Medicines | February 17, 2020 | |
| 105 | Creating a National Task Force to prevent the entry of Animal-Borne Diseases, Contain and control the transmission Thereof, and address issues relating thereto | February 21, 2020 | |
| 106 | Prohibiting the manufacture, distribution, marketing and sale of unregistered and/or adulterated electronic Nicotine/Non-Nicotine delivery systems, Heated Tobacco products and other novel tobacco products, Amending Executive Order No. 26 (S. 2017) and for other purposes | February 26, 2020 | |
| 107 | Reconstituting the Office for Transportation Security the National Civil Aviation Security Committee, Defining their Powers and Functions, Amending Executive Order Nos. 277 (S. 2004) and 311 (S. 2004) and for other purposes | March 13, 2020 | |
| 108 | Directing the Philippine Charity Sweepstakes Office to set aside a portion of the Standby Fund under Executive Order No. 201 (S. 2003) to cover the financial requirements of the national government's response to cases of COVID-19 in the country, Amending EO No. 201 and for other purposes. | March 14, 2020 | |
| 109 | Adjusting the Dividend Rate of the Landbank of the Philippines Pursuant to Section 5 of Republic Act No. 7656 | March 18, 2020 | |
| 110 | Institutionalizing the Comprehensive Social Benefits Program | April 7, 2020 | |
| 111 | Reconstituting the Office of the Presidential Spokesperson, Abolishing the Presidential Communications Development and Strategic Planning Office, and for other purposes. | April 27, 2020 | |
| 112 | Imposing an Enhanced Community Quarantine in High-Risk Geographic Areas of the Philippines and a General Community Quarantine in the rest of the country from May 1 to 15, 2020, Adopting the Omnibus Guidelines on the implementation thereof, and other purposes. | April 30, 2020 | |
| 113 | Temporarily Modifying the Rates of import duty on crude petroleum oil and refined petroleum products under Section 1611 of Republic Act No. 10863, Otherwise known as the "Customs Modernization and Tariff Act". | May 2, 2020 | |
| 114 | Institutionalizing the Balik Probinsya, Bagong Pag-Asa Program as a pillar of Balanced Regional Development, Creating a council Therefor, and for other purposes. | May 6, 2020 | |
| 115 | Extending the term of the Boracay Inter-Agency Task Force, Amending for the purpose Executive Order No. 53 (S. 2018) | May 11, 2020 | |
| 116 | Directing a Study for the Adoption of a National Position on a Nuclear Energy Program, Constituting a Nuclear Energy Program Inter-Agency Committee, and for Other Purposes | July 24, 2020 | |
| 117 | Reduction and Condonation of Real Property Taxes and Interest/Penalties Assessed on the Power Generation Facilities of Independent Power Producers Under Build-Operate-Transfer Contracts with Government-Owned or -Controlled Corporations | July 24, 2020 | |
| 118 | Directing the Department of Health, In Coordination with the Department of Trade and Industry, To ensure accessibility and affordability of COVID-19 tests and test kits | November 4, 2020 | |
| 119 | Establishing a National Government Administrative Center in New Clark City, Capas, Tarlac, Providing for an Integrated Government Center Outside the National Capital Region in Case of Disaster, and Directing the Whole-of-Government to Establish Satellite Offices Therein | November 18, 2020 | |
| 120 | Strengthening Rehabilitation and Recovery Efforts in Typhoon-Hit Areas Through the Creation of the Build Back Better Task Force | November 18, 2020 | |
| 121 | Granting Authority to the Director General of the Food and Drug Administration to Issue Emergency Use Authorization for COVID-19 Drugs and Vaccines, Prescribing Conditions Therefor, and for Other Purposes | December 2, 2020 | |
| 122 | Strengthening Border Control Through the Adoption and Implementation of the Advance Passenger Information System | December 15, 2020 | |

=== 2021 ===
| No. | Title / Description | Date signed | Ref. |
|---|---|---|---|
| 123 | Modifying the Rates of Import Duty on Certain Agricultural Products Under Section 1611 of the Republic Act No. 10863, Otherwise Known as the Customs Modernization and Tariff Act | January 15, 2021 | |
| 124 | Imposition of Mandated Price Ceiling on Selected Pork and Chicken Products in the National Capital Region | February 1, 2021 | |
| 125 | Creation of the National Amnesty Commission | February 5, 2021 | |
| 126 | Reduction and Condonation of Real Property Taxes and Interest/Penalties Assessed on the Power Generation Facilities of Independent Power Producers Under Build Operate-Transfer Contracts With Government-Owned or -Controlled Corporations | March 4, 2021 | |
| 127 | Expanding the Provision of Internet Services Through Inclusive Access to Satellite Services, Amending Executive Order No. 467 (s. 1998) for the Purpose | March 10, 2021 | |
| 128 | Temporarily Modifying the Rates of Import Duty on Fresh, Chilled or Frozen Meat of Swine Under Section 1611 of Republic Act No. 10863, Otherwise Known as the "Customs Modernization and Tariff Act" | April 7, 2021 | |
| 129 | Creating the Office of the Presidential Adviser on Streamlining of Government Processes, Providing Its Functions, and for Other Purposes | April 13, 2021 | |
| 130 | Amending Section 4 of Executive Order No. 79, s. 2012, Institutionalizing and Implementing Reforms in the Philippine Mining Sector, Providing Policies and Guidelines to Ensure Environmental Protection and Responsible Mining in the Utilization of Mineral Resources | April 14, 2021 | |
| 131 | Adjusting the Dividend Rate of the Home Guaranty Corporation Pursuant to Section 5 of Republic Act No. 7656 | April 28, 2021 | |
| 132 | Adjusting the Dividend Rate of the Land Bank of the Philippines Pursuant to Section 5 of Republic Act No. 7656 | April 28, 2021 | |
| 133 | Increasing the Minimum Access Volume for Pork Meat Under Republic Act No. 8178 or the "Agricultural Tariffication Act," as Amended | May 10, 2021 | |
| 134 | Further Modifying the Rates of Import Duty on Fresh, Chilled or Frozen Meat of Swine Under Section 1611 of Republic Act No. 10863, Otherwise Known as the "Customs Modernization and Tariff Act," Repealing Executive Order No. 128 (s. 2021) for the Purpose | May 15, 2021 | |
| 135 | Temporarily Modifying the Rates of Import Duty on Rice Under Section 1611 of Republic Act No. 10863, Otherwise Known as the "Customs Modernization and Tariff Act" | May 15, 2021 | |
| 136 | Creating the Philippine Trade Facilitation Committee in Compliance With the World Trade Organization – Trade Facilitation Agreement | May 18, 2021 | |
| 137 | Accelerating and Harmonizing Aid and Humanitarian Operations of the National Government During Disasters and Emergencies | May 24, 2021 | |
| 138 | Full Devolution of Certain Functions of the Executive Branch to Local Governments, Creation of a Committee on Devolution, and for Other Purposes | June 1, 2021 | |
| 139 | Authorizing Payment of Death and Burial Benefits to Indigenous Peoples Mandatory Representatives in Barangays, Amending Executive Order No. 115 (s. 2002) for the Purpose | June 1, 2021 | |
| 140 | Adopting the National Employment Recovery Strategy (NERS) 2021-2022 and Reinforcing Job-Generating Programs Through the NERS Task Force | June 25, 2021 | |
| 141 | Adopting as a National Priority the Implementation of Measures to Address the Root Causes of the Rising Number of Teenage Pregnancies, and Mobilizing Government Agencies for the Purpose | June 25, 2021 | |
| 142 | Approving the Merger of the Land Bank of the Philippines (LBP) and the United Coconut Planters Bank (UCPB), and the Acquisition by the LBP of the Special Preferred Shares of the Philippine Deposit Insurance Corporation (PDIC) in the UCPB | June 25, 2021 | |
| 143 | Creating the Energy Virtual One-Stop Shop Task Group, Providing Its Functions, and for Other Purposes | July 2, 2021 | |
| 144 | Institutionalizing the Financial Stability Coordination Council | July 6, 2021 | |
| 145 | Reinforcing the Policy on the Grant of Career Executive Service Officer Rank to Graduates of the National Defense College of the Philippines, Further Amending Executive Order No. 696 (s. 1981), as Amended, for the Purpose | August 3, 2021 | |
| 146 | Adjusting the Dividend Rate of the Overseas Filipino Bank Pursuant to Section 5 of Republic Act No. 7656 | August 5, 2021 | |
| 147 | Further Amending Executive Order No. 53 (s. 2018), as Amended, to Extend the Term of the Boracay Inter-Agency Task Force | September 14, 2021 | |
| 148 | Transferring the Philippine Crop Insurance Corporation (PCIC) From the Department of Agriculture to the Department of Finance, and Reorganizing the PCIC Board of Directors | September 14, 2021 | |
| 149 | Transferring the Metropolitan Waterworks and Sewerage System From the Department of Public Works and Highways to the Office of the President | September 27, 2021 | |
| 150 | Approving the Compensation and Position Classification System (CPCS) and Index of Occupational Services, Position Titles, and Job Grades for GOCCS (IOS-G) Framework, Repealing Executive Order No. 203 (s. 2016), and for Other Purposes | October 1, 2021 | |
| 151 | Approving the Nationwide Implementation of the Alert Level System for COVID-19 Response | November 11, 2021 | |
| 152 | Further Amending Executive Order (EO) No. 17 (s. 2017) and EO No. 55 (s. 2018), to Change the Rendering of the Name of the Filipino Hero From "Lapu-Lapu" to "Lapulapu" | December 6, 2021 | |
| 153 | Adjusting the Dividend Rate of the Philippine Guarantee Corporation Pursuant to Section 5 of Republic Act No. 7656 | December 6, 2021 | |
| 154 | Directing the Establishment of the Overseas Filipino Workers (OFW) Hospital, Creating the Inter-Agency Committee on the OFW Hospital, and for Other Purposes | December 7, 2021 | |
| 155 | Further Improving Access to Healthcare Through the Regulation of Prices in the Retail of Drugs and Medicines | December 7, 2021 | |
| 156 | Instituting Measures to Ensure Consistent and Reliable Electricity Service in Inadequately Served Areas, Improve Performance of Ineffective Distribution Utilities, and Achieve Total Electrification of the Country | December 9, 2021 | |
| 157 | Reduction and Condonation of Real Property Taxes and Interest/Penalties Assessed on the Power Generation Facilities of Independent Power Producers Under Build-Operate-Transfer Contracts With Government-Owned or -Controlled Corporations | December 16, 2021 | |
| 158 | Strengthening the Policy Framework on Peace, Reconciliation and Unity, and Reorganizing the Government's Administrative Structure for the Purpose | December 27, 2021 | |
| 159 | Adopting an Integrated Approach in the Ratification and Accession to International Maritime Organization Conventions and Instruments, and Reconstituting the Inter-Agency Coordinating Committee for the Purpose | December 28, 2021 | |
| 160 | Adopting an Integrated Approach in the Ratification and Accession to International Maritime Organization Conventions and Instruments, and Reconstituting the Inter-Agency Coordinating Committee for the Purpose | December 29, 2021 | |

=== 2022 ===
| No. | Title / Description | Date signed | Ref. |
|---|---|---|---|
| 161 | Transferring the Oversight of the Film Development Council of the Philippines From the Department of Education to the Department of Trade and Industry | January 27, 2022 | |
| 162 | Institutionalizing the Acceptance of the Philippine Identification or Philippine Identification System Number as Sufficient Proof of Identity and Age in All Government and Private Transactions | February 14, 2022 | |
| 163 | Institutionalizing Access to Protection Services for Refugees, Stateless Persons and Asylum Seekers | February 28, 2022 | |
| 164 | Adopting a National Position for a Nuclear Energy Program, and for Other Purposes | February 28, 2022 | |
| 165 | Prescribing Regulations on Out-of-Home Advertising Signs and Billboards | March 21, 2022 | |
| 166 | Adopting the Ten-Point Policy Agenda to Accelerate and Sustain Economic Recovery From the COVID-19 Pandemic, and Directing a Whole-of-Government Approach to Align All Economic Recovery Programs and Measures of the National Government | March 21, 2022 | |
| 167 | Strengthening the Philippine Commission on Women, Further Amending Executive Order No. 208 (s. 1994), as Amended, for the Purpose | April 6, 2022 | |
| 168 | Transferring the National Irrigation Administration From the Office of the President to the Department of Agriculture | April 25, 2022 | |
| 169 | Strengthening the Franchising Industry for the protection of Micro, Small and Medium Enterprises | May 12, 2022 | |
| 170 | Adoption of Digital Payments for Government disbursements and collections | May 12, 2022 | |
| 171 | Temporary Modifying the Rates of Import Duty on Various Products Under Section 1611 of Republic Act No. 10863, Otherwise Known as the "Customs Modernization and Tariff Act" | May 21, 2022 | |
| 172 | Approving the Coconut Farmers and Industry Development Plan | June 2, 2022 | |
| 173 | Directing the Abolition of the Municipal Development Fund Office, Transferring Its Assets, Liabilities and Obligations to the Department of Finance, and for Other Purposes | June 10, 2022 | |
| 174 | Establishing the Expanded Career Progression System for Public School Teachers | June 23, 2022 | |
| 175 | Promulgating the Twelfth Regular Foreign Investment Negative List | June 27, 2022 | |
| 176 | Reduction and Condonation of Real Property Taxes and Interest/Penalties Assessed on the Power Generation Facilities of Independent Power Producers Under Build-Operate-Transfer Contracts With Government-Owned or -Controlled Corporations | June 28, 2022 | |

== See also ==
- List of major acts and legislation during the presidency of Rodrigo Duterte
