= Philippine Executive Order 10 =

2016 executive order by Philippine President Rodrigo Duterte

Executive Order No. 10
- Long title: Creating a Consultative Committee to Review the 1987 Constitution
- Citation: Executive Order No. 10, s. 2016
- Territorial extent: Philippines
- Signed by: Rodrigo Duterte
- Signed: December 7, 2016
- Status: In force

Executive Order No. 10 was signed on December 7, 2016, by Philippine President Rodrigo Duterte which created a consultative committee to review the 1987 Constitution of the Philippines. The move officially set in motion the process for amending the 30-year-old charter and set up a federal system of government in the Philippines aimed at ending the Moro conflict and further opening up of the Philippine economy.

== Background ==
Rodrigo Duterte campaigned for decentralization and a shift to federal government during the 2016 Philippine presidential election. In an October 2014 forum organized by Federal Movement for a Better Philippines in Cebu City prior to joining the presidential race, the then mayor of Davao City called for the creation of two federal states for Moro people as a solution to the problems besetting Mindanao. Mayor Duterte said that Nur Misuari and his Moro National Liberation Front don't see eye-to-eye with the Moro Islamic Liberation Front which the administration of President Benigno Aquino III had inked a peace deal with. He also said that the "template of the Bangsamoro Basic Law is federal," but what is granted to the Bangsamoro should also be granted to other Moro groups and other regions in the country. In a dialogue with the Makati Business Club prior to the elections, Duterte said he is open to "toning down the Constitution" in order to accommodate more foreign investors to the Philippines. He also said he is open to up to 70 percent foreign ownership of businesses in the country and foreign lease of lands up to 60 years, but will "leave it to Congress to decide." The current constitution only allows 40 percent ownership for foreigners.

In his first State of the Nation Address after winning the elections, Duterte vowed that he would be stepping down from power even before his term ends in 2022 if Congress can set up the federal system in the next few years. He urged both houses of Congress to look into the federal semi–presidential form of government and said that "If you hurry up the federal system of government, you can submit to the Filipino people [in the] fourth, fifth year… You call for a referendum. And after that, call for a presidential elections." By the time Duterte signed Executive Order No. 10 on December 7, 2016, several legislators have filed bills to amend the Constitution, including Senators Franklin Drilon and Migz Zubiri who called for a constitutional convention, and Senators Ralph Recto and Richard J. Gordon who asked Congress to amend the restrictive economic provisions in the Constitution. In the House of Representatives, Deputy Speaker Gwendolyn Garcia filed a resolution calling both the House and the Senate to convene as a constitutional assembly which passed the House Committee on Constitutional Amendments on October 19, 2016.

== Provisions ==
Executive Order No. 10 provides for the creation of a panel of not more than 25 members to "study, conduct consultations, and review the provisions of the 1987 Constitution including, but not limited to, the provisions on the structure and powers of the government, local governance, and economic policies." The consultative committee shall represent the different regions and sectors of the country and shall be headed by a chairperson who will preside over its deliberations. The order also provides for the inclusion of the Executive Secretary in the committee who shall act as an observer during its deliberations. It also states that all committee members shall be appointed or designated by the president.

The order lists down the qualifications of the committee members such as being a Filipino natural-born citizen, resident and voter, at least 25 years of age, and of "recognized probity, independence, nationalism, patriotism, and expertise in his field." It provides each member of the committee with not more than 2 technical and support staff with the Presidential Management Staff serving as its secretariat.

The order also sets out the internal rules and procedures and the filling of vacancies in the committee, and orders the Department of Budget and Management to determine and provide its funding requirements and member's compensation. It also endeavors the consultative committee to complete its work and present its recommendations and proposals to the president, who will then submit them to Congress, in 6 months after it has convened.

== Consultative committee ==
On April 10, 2017, just before leaving for a series of state visits to Saudi Arabia, Bahrain and Qatar, President Duterte said he will name the 25 members of the ConCom after the draft of a new Bangsamoro Basic Law (BBL) is submitted and if there is substantial progress in the peace process with the National Democratic Front (NDF). The BBL was drafted by the 21-member Bangsamoro Transition Commission, composed of 11 nominees from the Moro Islamic Liberation Front and 10 from the Philippine government. Duterte also said that he is waiting for substantial progress in the peace talks with the NDF, particularly on the Comprehensive Agreement on Political and Constitutional Reforms, before announcing the composition of the ConCom.

=== Members of the Consultative Committee ===
- Reynato Puno (chairperson)
- Nene Pimentel
- Randolph Climaco Parcasio
- Antonio Arellano
- Susan Ubalde-Ordinario
- Arthur Aguilar
- Reuben Canoy
- Roan Libarios
- Laurence Wacnang
- Ali Pangalian Balindong
- Edmund Soriano Tayao
- Eddie Mapag Alih
- Bienvenido Reyes
- Julio Cabral Teehankee
- Antonio Nachura
- Virgilio Bautista
- Ranhilio Aquino
- Rodolfo Robles
- Victor de la Serna
- Jose Martin Azcarraga Loon
- Rex Cambronero Robles
- Ferdinand Bocobo
- Jozef Laguatan y Baliar

== See also ==
- Constitutional reform in the Philippines
- Federalism in the Philippines
- List of executive orders by Rodrigo Duterte
