= Discrimination against members of the armed forces in the United Kingdom =

Incidents have been reported of discrimination against soldiers of the armed forces of the United Kingdom, comprising the Royal Navy, the British Army and the Royal Air Force.

In December 2007, the British Prime Minister requested a report to evaluate the relationship between "our Armed Forces and the rest of society". The report details the following incidents:

- Troops returning from Afghanistan were told to change into civilian clothes at Birmingham Airport in December 2007.
- Troops returning from Afghanistan into Edinburgh Airport were directed away from the public areas through ad hoc facilities in 2007.
- Patients from the Defence Medical Rehabilitation Centre at Headley Court were subjected to verbal abuse in November 2007.
- RAF personnel were banned from wearing uniform in Peterborough after incidents of verbal abuse.

Other incidents of discrimination and harassment against soldiers reported in the media were not detailed in the report as they had not been corroborated.

On 4 September 2008, the Metro Hotel in Woking refused a wounded soldier a room, forcing him to spend the night in his car.

There were incidents of public houses banning soldiers in 2002.

== Current legal practice ==
Concerning the case of the Metro Hotel, legal experts confirmed that it was not against the law for hotel staff to turn away a potential customer because of his or her job. The report to the Prime Minister states that "It is quite intolerable that those who wear the Queen’s uniform should be denied access to public or commercial services as a result, but there is no legal protection for the targets of such discrimination."

Proposals to improve the situation are limited to the "legal protection of the uniform". Thus a hotel could presumably still refuse an officer who did not wear his uniform. For example, the Metro Hotel refused the non-uniformed soldier when he presented his Army identification card. Some members of the public have taken matters into their own hands. Metro Hotel had to call the police as their lines were flooded with angry, abusive and threatening calls. Mr Kai Graf von der Pahlen and Mr Taha Idris of the Swansea Bay Racial Equality Council published research on "soldier discrimination" that raises the question whether such discrimination could constitute unlawful indirect gender discrimination. The research shows that male soldiers may have a case for unlawful gender discrimination because most of the soldiers of the UK Armed Forces are male. The discriminator is thus effectively excluding a predominantly (approximately 90%) male group of people, which is classed as "indirect gender discrimination" under the Sex Discrimination Act 1975 and therefore unlawful.
