= List of major acts and legislation during the presidency of Rodrigo Duterte =

This is a list of major acts and legislation which were signed by Philippine President Rodrigo Duterte. It includes landmark bills which were passed during his presidency and lapsed into law.

== Major acts and legislation ==
=== 2016 ===
R. A. No.	Title / Description	Date signed	Ref.
10923	An Act postponing the October 2016 Barangay and Sangguniang Kabataan Elections, Amending for the Purpose Republic Act No. 9164, as amended by Republic Act No. 9340 and Republic Act No. 10656, Prescribing Additional Rules Governing the Conduct of Barangay and Sangguniang Kabataan Elections and for Other Purposes	October 15, 2016	

=== 2017 ===
R. A. No.	Title / Description	Date signed	Ref.
10927	An Act Designating Casinos as Covered Persons under Republic Act No. 9160, known as the "Anti-Money Laundering Act of 2001"	July 14, 2017	
10928	Amending Section 10 of Republic Act No. 8239, known as the "Philippine Passport Act of 1996"	August 2, 2017	
10929	Free Internet Access in Public Places Act	August 2, 2017	
10930	An Act Rationalizing and Strengthening the Policy Regarding Driver's License by Extending the Validity Period of Drivers’ Licenses, and Penalizing Acts in Violation of its Issuance and Application, Amending for Those Purposes Section 23 of Republic Act No. 4136, as Amended by Batas Pambansa Blg. 398 and Executive Order No. 1011, Otherwise Known as The Land Transportation and Traffic Code	August 2, 2017	
10931	Universal Access to Quality Tertiary Education Act	August 3, 2017	
10932	An Act Strengthening the Anti-Hospital Deposit Law by Increasing the Penalties for the Refusal of Hospitals and Medical Clinics to Administster Appropriate Initial Medical Treatment and Support in Emergency or Serious Cases, Amending for the Purpose Batas Pambansa Bilang 702, Otherwlse Known as “An Act Prohibiting the Demand of Deposits or Advance Payments for the Confinement or Treatment of Patients in Hospitals and Medical Clinics in Certain Cases”, As Amended by Republic Act No. 8344, and for Other Purposes	August 5, 2017	
10951	An Act Adjusting the Amount or the Value of Property and Damage on Which a Penalty is Based and the Fines Imposed Under the Revised Penal Code, Amending for the Purpose Act No. 3815, Otherwise Known as “The Revised Penal Code”, as Amended	August 29, 2017	
10952	An Act Postponing the October 2017 Barangay and Sangguniang Katabaan Elections, Amending for the Purpose Republic Act No. 9164, as Amended by Republic Act No. 9340, Republic Act No. 10632, Republic Act No. 10656, and Republic Act No. 10923, and for Other Purposes	October 2, 2017	
10962	Gift Check Act of 2017	December 19, 2017	
10963	Tax Reform for Acceleration and Inclusion Law	December 19, 2017	

=== 2018 ===
R. A. No.	Title / Description	Date signed	Ref.
10968	Philippine Qualifications Framework Act	January 16, 2018	
10969	Free Irrigation Service Act	February 2, 2018	
11032	Ease of Doing Business and Efficient Government Service Delivery Act	May 28, 2018	
11035	Balik Scientist Act (lit. 'Returning Scientist Act')	June 15, 2018	
11036	Mental Health Act	June 20, 2018	
11037	Masustansyang Pagkain para sa Batang Pilipino Act (lit. 'Nutritious Food for the Filipino Youth Act')	June 20, 2018	
11038	Expanded National Integrated Protected Areas System Act	June 22, 2018	
11039	Electric Cooperatives Emergency and Resiliency Act	June 29, 2018	
11052	Philippine Food Technology Act	June 29, 2018	
11053	Anti-Hazing Act of 2018	June 29, 2018	
11054	Bangsamoro Organic Law	July 26, 2018	
11055	Philippine Identification System Act of 2018	August 6, 2018	
11057	Personal Property Security Act	August 17, 2018	
11058	Occupational Safety and Health Standards Law	August 20, 2018	
11106	Filipino Sign Language Act	November 12, 2018	
11131	The Philippine Criminology Profession Act of 2018	November 15, 2018	
11148	Kalusugan at Nutrisyon ng Mag-Nanay Act (lit. 'Health and Nutrition for Mother and Child Act')	November 29, 2018	
11663	National Bible Day Act	December 20, 2018	
11665	Telecommuting Act	December 20, 2018	
11666	Philippine HIV and AIDS Policy Act of 2018	December 20, 2018	

=== 2019 ===
R. A. No.	Title / Description	Date signed	Ref.
11180	Athletic Programs Report Act	January 3, 2019	
11188	Special Protection of Children in Situations of Armed Conflict Act	January 10, 2019	
11194	Gabaldon Schools Buildings Conservation Act	February 7, 2019	
11199	Social Security Act of 2019	February 8, 2019	
11200	An act providing for the rank classification in the Philippine National Police, Amending for the purpose Section 28 of Republic Act No. 6975, As amended, Otherwise known as the “Department of the Interior and Local Government Act of 1990”	February 8, 2019	
11202	Mobile Number Portability Act	February 8, 2019	
11201	Creation of Department of Human Settlements and Urban Development	February 14, 2019	
11203	Rice Tariffication Act	February 14, 2019	
11206	Secondary School Career Guidance and Counseling Act	February 14, 2019	
11207	An act Providing for reasonable rates for political advertisements, Amending for the purpose section 11 of Republic Act No. 9006, otherwise known as the “Fair Election Act”	February 14, 2019	
11211	An act amending Republic Act No. 7653, otherwise known as “The New Central Bank Act”, and for other purposes	February 14, 2019	
11213	Tax Amnesty Act	February 14, 2019	
11214	Philippine Sports Training Center Act	February 14, 2019	
11215	National Integrated Cancer Control Act	February 14, 2019	
11210	105-Day Expanded Maternity Act	February 20, 2019	
11223	Universal Health Care Act	February 20, 2019	
11232	Revised Corporation Code of the Philippines	February 20, 2019	
11222	Simulated Birth Rectification Act	February 21, 2019	
11227	Handbook for OFWs Act of 2018	February 22, 2019	
11229	Child Safety in Motor Vehicles Act	February 22, 2019	
11230	Tulong Trabaho Act (lit. 'Job Help Act')	February 22, 2019	
11231	Agricultural Free Patent Reform Act	February 22, 2019	
11234	Energy Virtual One-Stop Shop Act	March 8, 2019	
11235	Motorcycle Crime Prevention Act	March 8, 2019	
11239	An Act abolishing the Road Board and providing for the disposition of the motor vehicle user's charges, collections, Amending for the purpose Republic Act No. 8794, entitled “An act imposing a motor vehicle user's charge on owners of all types motor vehicles and for other purposes”	March 8, 2019	
11241	Philippine Occupational Therapy Law	March 11, 2019	
11249	Speech Language Pathology Act	March 22, 2019	
11261	First Time Job Seekers Assistance Act	April 10, 2019	
11285	Energy Efficiency and Conservation Act	April 12, 2019	
11291	Magna Carta of the Poor	April 12, 2019	
11292	The Seal of Good Local Governance Act of 2019	April 12, 2019	
11293	Philippine Innovation Act	April 17, 2019	
11310	Pantawid Pamilyang Pilipino Program Act	April 17, 2019	
11311	An Act to Improve Land Transportation Terminals, Stations, Stops, Rest Areas, and Roll-on/Roll-off Terminals	April 17, 2019	
11312	Magna Carta for Scientists	April 17, 2019	
11313	Safe Spaces Act	April 17, 2019	
11314	Student Fare Discount Act	April 17, 2019	
11315	Community-Based Monitoring System Act	April 17, 2019	
11321	Sagip Saka Act	April 17, 2019	
11332	Mandatory Reporting of Notifiable Diseases and Health Events of Public Health Concern Act	April 26, 2019	
11333	National Museum of the Philippines Act	April 26, 2019	
11337	Innovative Startup Act	April 26, 2019	
11346	An Act increasing the Excise Tax on tobacco products, Imposing Excise Tax on heated tobacco products and apor products, increasing the penalties for violations of provisions on Articles subject to Excise Tax, and earmarking a portion of the total excise tax collections from Sugar-Sweetened Beverages, Alcohol, Tobacco, Heated Tobacco and Vapor Products for Universal Health Care, Amending for this purpose Sections 144, 145, 146, 147, 152, 164, 260, 262, 263, 265, 288, and 289, Repealing section 288(B) and 288(C), and creating new Sections 263-A, 265-B, and 288-A of the National Internal Revenue Code of 1997, As amended by Republic Act No. 10963, and for other purposes.	July 25, 2019	
11350	National Commission of Senior Citizens Act	July 25, 2019	
11358	National Vision Screening Act	July 31, 2019	
11361	Anti-Obstruction of Power Lines Act	August 8, 2019	
11362	Community Service Act	August 8, 2019	
11363	Philippine Space Act	August 8, 2019	
11364	Cooperative Development Authority Charter of 2019	August 8, 2019	
11369	National Student's Day of 2019	August 8, 2019	
11371	Murang Kuryente Act	August 8, 2019	
11372	Philippine Coast Guard General Hospital Act	August 8, 2019	
11392	National Performing Arts Companies Act	August 22, 2019	
11393	Advanced Energy and Green Building Technologies Curriculum Act	August 22, 2019	
11394	Mandatory Provision of Neutral Desks in Educational Institutions Act	August 22, 2019	
11396	SUC's Land Use Development and Infrastructure Plan Act	August 22, 2019	
11398	Philippine Fisheries Profession Act	August 22, 2019	
11448	Transnational Higher Education Act	August 28, 2019	
11459	Judges-at-Large Act of 2019	August 30, 2019	
11463	Malasakit Centers Act	December 3, 2019	

=== 2020 ===
R. A. No.	Title / Description	Date signed	Ref.
11466	Salary Standardization Law of 2019	January 8, 2020	
11467	An Act amending Sections 109, 141, 142, 143, 144, 147, 152, 263, 263-A, 265, and 288, and adding a new section 290-A to Republic Act 8424 as amended, otherwise known as the National Internal Revenue Code of 1997, and for other purposes.	January 22, 2020	
11468	National Day of Remembrance for Road Crash Victims, Survivors, and Their Families Act	January 23, 2020	
11469	Bayanihan to Heal as One Act	March 24, 2020	
11470	National Academy of Sports Act	June 9, 2020	
11476	GMRC and Values Education Act	June 25, 2020	
11479	Anti-Terrorism Act of 2020	July 3, 2020	.
11494	Bayanihan to Recover as One Act	September 11, 2020	
11509	Doktor Para sa Bayan Act	December 23, 2020	
11510	Alternative Learning System Act	December 23, 2020	
11511	An act amending Republic Act No. 10068 or the Organic Agriculture Act of 2010	December 23, 2020	
11517	An Act authorizing the President to Expedite the processing and issuance of National and Local permits, licenses and certifications in times of National Emergency	December 23, 2020	

=== 2021 ===
R. A. No.	Title / Description	Date signed	Ref.
11523	Financial Institutions Strategic Transfer Act	February 16, 2021	
11524	Coconut Farmers and Industry Trust Fund Act	February 26, 2021	
11525	COVID-19 Vaccination Program Act of 2021	February 26, 2021	
11534	Corporate Recovery and Tax Incentives for Enterprises Act	March 26, 2021	
11549	PNP, BFP, BJMP, and BuCor Height Equality Act	May 26, 2021	
11551	Labor Education Act	May 27, 2021	
11571	JCEC Enhancement Act	July 6, 2021	
11589	Bureau of Fire Protection Modernization Act	September 10, 2021	
11590	An Act Taxing Philippine Offshore Gaming Operations, Amending for the Purpose Sections 22, 26, 27, 28, 106, 108, and Adding New Sections 125-a and 288(G) of the National Internal Revenue Code of 1997, as Amended, and for Other Purposes	September 22, 2021	
11592	LPG Industry Regulation Act	October 14, 2021	
11595	An Act Amending Republic Act No. 8762, Otherwise Known as the "Retail Trade Liberalization Act of 2000", by Lowering the Required Paid-up Capital for Foreign Retail Enterprises, and for Other Purposes	December 10, 2021	
11596	An Act Prohibiting the Practice of Child Marriage and Imposing Penalties for Violations Thereof	December 10, 2021	
11641	Department of Migrant Workers Act	December 30, 2021	

=== 2022 ===
R. A. No.	Title / Description	Date signed	Ref.
11642	Domestic Administrative Adoption and Child Care Act	January 10, 2022	
11646	Microgrid Systems Act	January 21, 2022	
11647	An Act Promoting Foreign Investments, Amending Thereby Republic Act No. 7042, Otherwise Known as the "Foreign Investments Act of 1991," as Amended, and for Other Purposes	March 2, 2022	
11648	An Act Providing for Stronger Protection Against Rape and Sexual Exploitation and Abuse, Increasing the Age for Determining the Commission of Statutory Rape, Amending for the Purpose Act No. 3815, as Amended, Otherwise Known as "the Revised Penal Code," Republic Act No. 8353, Also Known as "the Anti-Rape Law of 1997," and Republic Act No. 7610, as Amended, Otherwise Known as the "Special Protection of Children Against Abuse, Exploitation and Discrimination Act"	March 4, 2022	
11650	An Act Instituting a Policy of Inclusion and Services for Learners With Disabilities in Support of Inclusive Education, Establishing Inclusive Learning Resource Centers of Learners With Disabilities in All Schools Districts, Municipalities and Cities, Providing for Standards, Appropriating Funds Therefor, and for Other Purposes	March 11, 2022	
11659	An Act Amending Commonwealth Act No. 146 otherwise known as the Public Service Act	March 21, 2022	
11683	An Act Amending Section 450 of Republic Act No. 7160, Otherwise Known as the Local Government Code of 1991, as Amended by Republic Act No. 9009, by Providing for the Requisites for the Conversion of a Municipality Into a Component City, and for Other Purposes	April 10, 2022	
11684	Mt. Arayat Protected Landscape Act	April 8, 2022	
11685	Mt. Pulag Protected Landscape Act	April 8, 2022	
11686	Naga-Kabasalan Protected Landscape Act	April 8, 2022	
11687	Tirad Pass Protected Landscape Act	April 8, 2022	
11688	Banao Protected Landscape Act	April 8, 2022	
11691	Judiciary Marshals Act	April 11, 2022	
11696	Marawi Siege Victims Compensation Act of 2022	April 13, 2022	
11697	Electric Vehicle Industry Development Act	April 15, 2022 (Note: Lapsed into law without the signature of President Duterte)	
11698	Vintage Vehicle Regulation Act	April 15, 2022	
11701	An Act Granting Night Shift Differential Pay to Government Employees Including Those in Government-Owned or -Controlled Corporations and Appropriating Funds Therefor	April 13, 2022	
11706	An Act Providing for the Establishment of Timbangan Ng Bayan Centers in Public and Private Markets, Amending for the Purpose Chapter Ii, Title Iii of Republic Act No. 7394, Otherwise Known as the "Consumer Act of the Philippines"	April 13, 2022	
11709	An Act Strengthening Professionalism and Promoting the Continuity of Policies and Modernization Initiatives in the Armed Forces of the Philippines, by Prescribing Fixed Terms for Key Officers Thereof, Increasing the Mandatory Retirement Age of Generals/Flag Officers, Providing for a More Effective Attrition System, and Providing Funds Therefor	April 13, 2022	
11711	An Act Further Amending Republic Act No. 4566, as Amended, Otherwise Known as the Contractors’ License Law	April 27, 2022	
11712	Public Health Emergency Benefits and Allowances for Health Care Workers Act	April 27, 2022	
11713	Excellence in Teacher Act	April 27, 2022	
11765	An Act Affording More Protection to Consumers of Financial Products and Services	May 6, 2022	
11766	An Act Fixing the Validity Period of the License to Own and Possess, Registration, and Permit to Carry Firearms Outside of Residence or Place of Business, Amending for the Purpose Sections 7 and 19 of Republic Act No. 10591, Otherwise Known as the "Comprehensive Firearms and Ammunition Regulation Act"	May 6, 2022	
11767	Foundling Recognition and Protection Act	May 6, 2022	
11768	An Act Strengthening the Sangguniang Kabataan, Institutionalizing Additional Reforms to Revitalize Youth Participation in Local Governance and by Providing Honorarium, Other Benefits, and Privileges, Amending for the Purpose Certain Sections of Republic Act No. 10742, Otherwise Known as the "Sangguniang Kabataan Reform Act of 2015"	May 6, 2022	
11840	Philippine Deposit Insurance Corp. charter	June 17, 2022	
11861	Expanded Solo Parents Welfare Act	June 4, 2022	
11862	An Act Strengthening the Policies on Anti-Trafficking in Persons, Providing Penalties for Its Violations, and Appropriating Funds Therefor, Amending for the Purpose Republic Act No. 9208, as Amended, Otherwise Known as the "Anti-Trafficking in Persons Act of 2003", and Other Special Laws	June 23, 2022	
11898	Extended Producer Responsibility Act	July 23, 2022	
11900	Vaporized Nicotine and Non-Nicotine Products Regulation Act	July 25, 2022	
11904	Creative Industries Charter of the Philippines	July 28, 2022	
11917	Private Security Services Industry Act	July 30, 2022	
11926	Willful and Indiscriminate Discharge of Firearms	July 30, 2022	
11927	Digital Workforce Competitiveness Act	July 30, 2022	
11928	Separate Facility for Heinous Crimes Inmates Act	July 30, 2022	
11929	National Music Competitions for Young Artists Act	July 30, 2022	
11930	Anti-Online Sexual Abuse and Exploitation Children (OSAEC) Law	July 30, 2022	

== See also ==
- List of executive orders by Rodrigo Duterte
