= Safe Spaces Act =

2019 Philippine law

Safe Spaces Act of 2019

Congress of the Philippines
- Long title: An Act Defining and Penalizing Gender-based Street and Public Spaces Harassment, Expanding the Definition of Sexual Harassment, and Amending for this Purpose Republic Act No. 7877, and for Other Purposes
- Citation: Republic Act No. 11313
- Territorial extent: Philippines
- Passed by: Senate of the Philippines
- Passed: October 8, 2018
- Passed by: House of Representatives of the Philippines
- Passed: January 9, 2019
- Signed by: Rodrigo Duterte
- Signed: April 17, 2019
- Effective: August 3, 2019

Legislative history

Initiating chamber: Senate of the Philippines
- Bill title: Safe Spaces Act of 2017
- Bill citation: Senate Bill No. 1558
- Introduced by: Risa Hontiveros
- Introduced: August 16, 2017
- Voting summary: 21 voted for; 3 absent

Revising chamber: House of Representatives of the Philippines
- Bill title: Safe Street, Public and Online Spaces Act of 2018
- Bill citation: House Bill No. 8794
- Received from the Senate of the Philippines: December 12, 2018
- Member(s) in charge: Bernadette Herrera
- Voting summary: 208 voted for

Amends
- Anti-Sexual Harassment Act
- Status: In force

The Safe Spaces Act, colloquially known as the Bawal Bastos Law and officially designated as Republic Act No. 11313, is a Philippine law that penalizes gender-based sexual harassment.

== Legislative history ==
=== Senate ===
The Safe Spaces Act of 2019 was first proposed in the Senate, the upper house of the Congress of the Philippines as Senate Bill No. 1326 on November 22, 2016, with Senator Risa Hontiveros as the author. Two more similar bills were filed; Senate Bill No. 1254 by Senator Grace Poe on November 22, 2016, and Senate Bill No. 1326 by Hontiveros on February 14, 2017.

During a Senate session on August 1, 2018. Senator Tito Sotto asked Hontiveros if the provisions on gender-based harassment is too similar to the proposed SOGIE Bill. Hontiveros says that sexual harassment and discrimination which the latter is covered by the SOGIE Bill are different but overlaps may occur if the victim happens to be LGBTQ and may seek the proposed Safe Spaces law as recourse. Sotto also ask what would happen if under a hypothetical scenario of a straight man groping another straight man which he believes will not be covered by the Safe Spaces Act. Hontiveros suggest th man be held liable for "acts of lasciviousness" in that scenario.

It was later refiled as Senate Bill No. 1558 consolidating the three prior bills on August 16, 2017, with Senator Hontiveros as the principal author. It passed on the third reading on October 8, 2018, with all 21 Senators voting in favor.

=== House of Representatives ===
The House of Representatives counterpart bill of what will later become the Safe Spaces Act of 2019 was House Bill No. 8794 or Safe Street, Public and Online Spaces. It was sponsored by Bernadette Herrera of Bagong Henerasyon on December 12, 2018. It was unanimously passed on the third reading on January 9, 2019, with all 208 legislators present voting in favor.

=== Consolidation ===
The Senate ratified the reconciled Safe Space Act on February 6, 2019.

=== Signing into law and implementing rules ===
President Rodrigo Duterte signed the bill into law on April 17, 2019. Duterte's signing was only publicized on July 15, 2019, and hence it was earlier believed to have lapsed into law on April 21, 2019. The law took effect on August 3, 2019.

The implementing rules and regulations (IRR) drafted by a technical drafting committee led by the Philippine Commission on Women was signed on October 28, 2019.

== Scope ==
The Safe Spaces Act complements the existing Anti-Sexual Harassment Act (Republic Act No. 7877), penalizing acts not covered under said law. RA 7877 penalizes sexual harassment in the context of work, education, and training only. The Safe Spaces Act expands the scope of the older law. The Safe Spaces Act:

- Covers offenses committed in the streets, public spaces, and online in addition to the workplace and educational/training setting.
- Penalizes what it defines as "gender-based sexual harassment" (GBSH), or acts which causes mental, emotional or psychological distress to a person on the basis of gender, gender identity and/or expression
- It dispenses the requirement of the perpetrator having authority, influence or moral ascendancy over the victim which is stipulated in RA 7877.

It is also noted to penalize acts against LGBTQ people.

== Proposed amendments ==
On January 14, 2025, Senate Bill No. 2897 which proposes amendement to the Safe Spaces Act was passed in the third reading. The bill was still pending on the House of Representatives side. The bill takes into account artificial intelligence technology for online sexual harassment, as well as expanding the definition to include streets and alleys in rural areas, fields, farms, coastal areas, and multi-purpose halls. It also provides clearer definition to sexual grooming.
