= Philippine Public Safety Academy =

Firefighting and jail officers academy in the Philippines

- Type: Specialized Higher Education Institution service academy
- Established: June 2, 2022; 4 years ago
- Affiliations: DILG, PPSC, BFP, BJMP
- Director: FSSUPT Randolph V. Bides
- Location: Camp Vicente Lim, Calamba, Laguna, Philippines
- Campus: Urban
- Website: ppsa.edu.ph

The Philippine Public Safety Academy or PPSA is a constitutive unit of the Philippine Public Safety College, a public safety school whose graduates are assigned as officers of the Bureau of Jail Management and Penology (BJMP) and the Bureau of Fire Protection (BFP). PPSA is temporarily located inside the Camp Vicente Lim, sharing facility with the National Forensic Science Training Institute.

== History ==
The founding of the Philippine Public Safety Academy was born out of institutional necessity and strategic vision. For decades, the Philippine National Police Academy had served as the single proving ground for the country’s tri-bureau public safety officers—producing leaders for the police, fire, and jail services under one roof. But as modern public safety challenges grew more complex, the demands on fire protection, technical rescue, hazardous materials response, and penology evolved into specialized disciplines requiring dedicated leadership development.

The critical turning point came in 2019 with the passage of Republic Act No. 11279, which transferred the administration of the PNPA exclusively to the Philippine National Police. This created an urgent need for a dedicated officer-producing institution for the Bureau of Fire Protection and the Bureau of Jail Management and Penology.

Through the resolute efforts and vision of then PPSC President Police Lieutenant General Ricardo F. de Leon (Ret) and then DILG Secretary Eduardo M. Año, the Philippine Public Safety Academy was formally established under DILG Department Circular No. 2022-009.

Operationalized on June 2, 2022, inside Camp Vicente Lim in Calamba, Laguna, the academy was initially led by JSSUPT Leonalyn O. Oloan as its pioneer Director, laying the operational foundations and academic frameworks for the nascent institution. The stewardship of the academy was subsequently continued by FSSUPT Randolph V. Bides, who took the helm as Director to further consolidate and elevate its tactical, administrative, and doctrine-development capabilities.

The Philippine Public Safety Academy (PPSA) offers degree programs in Fire Protection Administration and Penology and Corrections Administration. Graduates of these programs are commissioned as officers in the Bureau of Fire Protection (BFP) and the Bureau of Jail Management and Penology (BJMP).Thenationalnews

The academy’s motto is “Courage, Integrity, Service.”

== Curriculum ==
The PPSA has a two-year program, namely:

- Bachelor of Science in Fire Protection Administration
- Bachelor of Science in Penology and Corrections Administration

Graduating cadets are then commissioned as members of the Bureau of Fire Protection or Bureau of Jail Management and Penology carried the rank of Fire/Jail Inspector and receive appropriate commissions of their organization. The rank was equivalent to an Army and Air Force First Lieutenant or Navy Lieutenant Junior Grade.

== See also ==
- Philippine Public Safety College
- Philippine Military Academy
- Philippine Merchant Marine Academy
- Philippine National Police Academy
- National Defense College of the Philippines
- Cadet rank in the Philippines
- Bureau of Fire Protection
- Bureau of Jail Management and Penology
