= 911 (Philippines) =

Emergency telephone number

911, sometimes written 9-1-1, is the national emergency telephone number of the Philippines managed by the Emergency 911 National Office.

On August 1, 2016, 911 and 8888, a public complaint hotline, effectively replaced Patrol 117.

== History ==
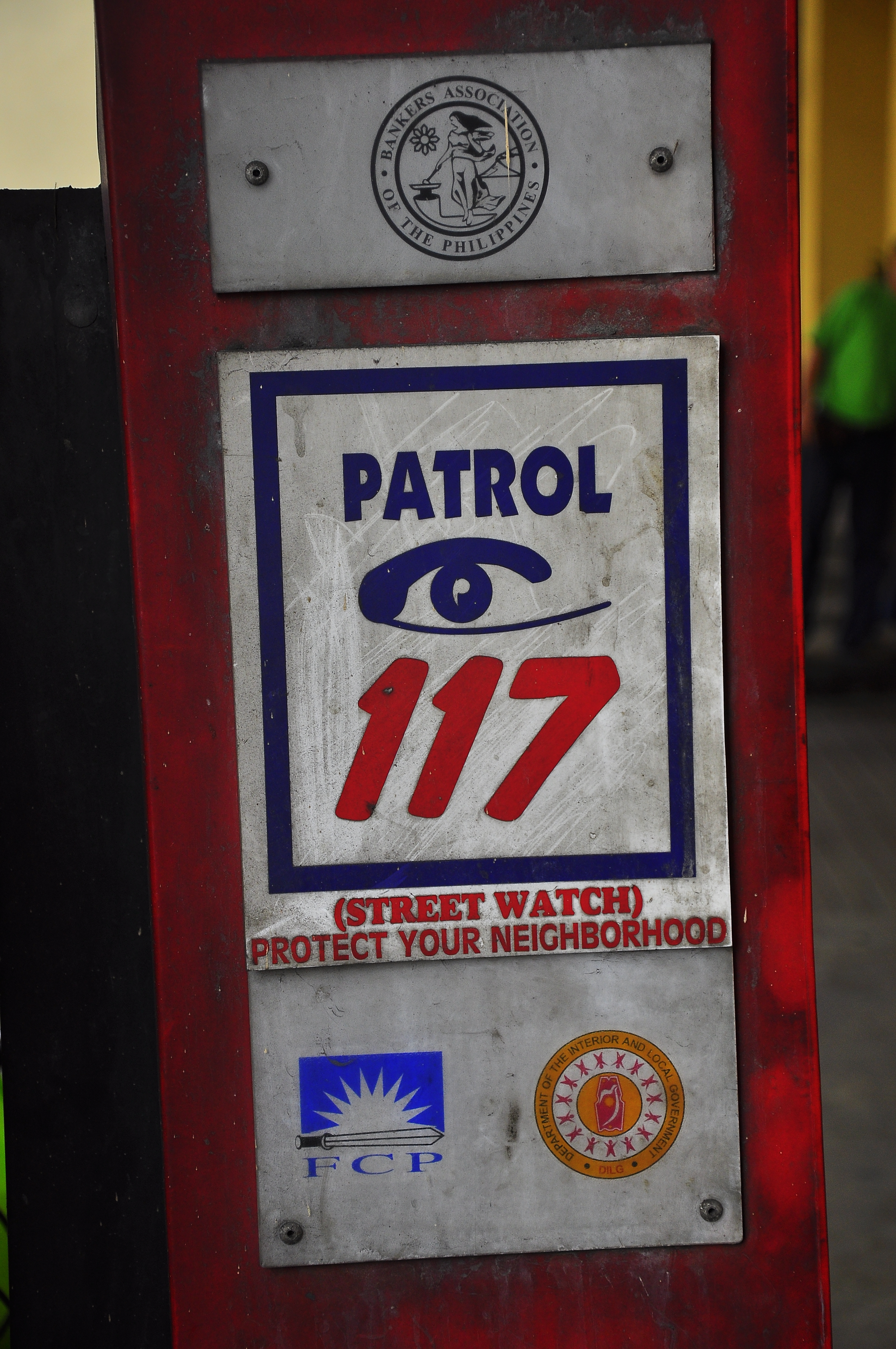
117 was a former national emergency hotline before it was replaced by 911.

Prior to the inception of 117, emergency services were reached through a myriad of telephone numbers. The fire department in Manila, for example, had fifty telephone numbers, one for every fire station in the city. In February 1998, the 117 hotline was implemented by PLDT. At the time, 117 was solely used in the Metro Manila area by the Philippine National Police for the reporting of ongoing crimes as part of a program called the "Patrol 117 Street Patrol Program" in cooperation with the Foundation for Crime Prevention. Efforts to expand the capabilities of 117 began in the 1990s, starting with the addition of emergency medical services to the scope of 117 in Metro Manila through a private-sector initiative called Project EARnet (Emergency Assistance and Response network).

Project EARnet consists of emergency resuce professionals managed by the Bureau of Fire Protection. A PLDT operator relays calls for 117 to either a Project EARet operator or a police precinct.

Government involvement in the expansion of 117's scope began in late 1998, when the DILG announced the formation of Emergency Network Philippines, a project that sought to support a national emergency telephone number in order to enable the faster delivery of emergency services to the Filipino people.

On August 8, 2001, a memorandum of agreement was signed between the DILG and Frequentis, an Austrian company, on the implementation of the ENP project. The National Economic and Development Authority approved the project later in the year, and project funding was secured with a loan agreement being signed between the Philippine and Austrian governments on December 6.

By virtue of Executive Order No. 226, 117 became the official national emergency telephone number of the Philippines on July 14, 2003.

The ₱1.4 billion project was completed on August 2, 2003, with the opening of a new 117 call center in Quezon City, serving the entire Metro Manila area. Four more 117 call centers were opened in 2006, and the full network, consisting of sixteen networked call centers, was rolled out in 2007.

In 2016, at his first cabinet meeting after his inauguration, President Rodrigo Duterte vowed to put up a complaint hotline, 8888, while Presidential Communications Secretary Martin Andanar said that the existing 117 hotline would be replaced by 911.

On August 1, 2016, 911 was launched as the nationwide emergency hotline number by the Philippine National Police (PNP). 911 is patterned on the same system that was implemented in Davao City by President Rodrigo Duterte while he was still mayor.

Toyota Wigo Unified 911 police car

On September 11, 2025, the Department of the Interior and Local Government (DILG) launched the Unified 911, a centralized emergency hotline integrating and streamlining all local emergency contact numbers across the Philippines. The system, which combines police, fire, and hospital emergency services, uses automated filtering and blocking mechanism to identify and filter repeated prank calls and deprioritizes prank callers in their following calls. The Unified 911 also provides operators trained in local languages and dialects.

== Coverage ==
911 service is available nationwide 24/7. Depending on the location of the call, a 911 call will route to any of the sixteen existing 117 call centers located in various cities around the Philippines. Each call center serves a single region.

Telecommunications Commissioner Gamaliel Cordoba in 2016 said that all calls to 911 will be rerouted to the existing Patrol 117 hotline while the 911 command center is not yet established.

Existing 117 call centers are located in the following areas:

- Region I: Laoag
- Region II: Tuguegarao
- Region III: Balanga
- Region IV-A: Batangas City
- Region IV-B: Puerto Princesa
- Region V: Legazpi
- Region VI: Iloilo City
- Region VII: Cebu City
- Region VIII: Tacloban
- Region IX: Zamboanga City
- Region X: Malaybalay
- Region XI: Davao City
- Region XII: Koronadal
- Region XIII: Butuan
- CAR: Baguio
- NCR: Quezon City

== Other Emergency numbers ==
Other than 911, other emergency numbers are also used around the country, maintained and operated by both government agencies and the private sector.

Agency Name	Phone Number	Specialized for	Area Coverage
Emergency 911 National Office (Philippines)	911	All emergencies	Nationwide
Philippine Red Cross (PRC)	143	Humanitarian aid	Nationwide
PRC Blood Unit	1158	Blood donation	Nationwide
Philippine National Police (PNP)	911	Police	Nationwide
PNP Women and Children Protection Unit	177 / 09197777377	Violence against women, Child abuse	Nationwide
VAWC 24/7 Hotline	723-0401-6979	Violence against women, Child abuse	Nationwide
Bureau of Fire Protection (BFP)	911	Firefighting, Emergency response, Emergency medical services, Wildlife Rescue, Rescue, Revised Fire Code of the Philippines of 2008	Nationwide
Department of Health (DOH)	911	Medical emergency	Nationwide
DOH COVID-19	1555	COVID-19	Nationwide
National Center for Mental Health (NCMH)	1800-1888-1553	Mental health	Nationwide
Department of Trade and Industry (DTI)	1384	Consumer Care	Nationwide
Department of Information & Communications Technology, Scam Watch Pilipinas	1326	Spam reporting, Scam, Phishing	Nationwide
National Complaint Hotline	8888	Public service, Complaint, Ombudsman	Nationwide
Anti-Red Tape Authority (ARTA)	1-2782	Public service, Complaint, Ombudsman	Nationwide
Civil Service Commission (Philippines) (CSC), Contact Center ng Bayan	Text 0908-881-6565	Public service, Complaint, Ombudsman	Nationwide
Office of the Ombudsman (Philippines)	(02) 8926-2662, (02) 5317-8300	Public service, Complaint, Ombudsman	Nationwide
Department of Social Welfare and Development (DSWD)	16545	Social services	Nationwide
Bantay Bata	163	Child protection, Social welfare, ABS-CBN Foundation	Nationwide
Council for the Welfare of Children (Philippines), 1383 MAKABATA Helpline	1383	Child protection, Social Welfare, Convention on the Rights of the Child	Nationwide
Inter-Agency Council Against Trafficking, 1343 ACTIONLINE AGAINST HUMAN TRAFFICKING	1343	Human trafficking	Nationwide
National Commission Of Senior Citizens (NCSC)	(02) 8567-5646 / 0962-274-3622	Elder rights	Nationwide
National Council on Disability Affairs (NCDA)	(632) 5310-4761 / (632) 8932-3663	Convention on the Rights of Persons with Disabilities	Nationwide
Commission on Human Rights (CHR)	(02) 8927-5790	Human rights in the Philippines, International Bill of Human Rights	Nationwide
Overseas Workers Welfare Administration (OWWA)	(+632) 1348	Overseas Filipino Workers	Worldwide
Department of Labor and Employment (DOLE)	1530	Employment, Labor Code of the Philippines	Nationwide
Department of Transportation (DOTR)	7890	Public transport	Nationwide
Land Transportation Franchising and Regulatory Board (LTFRB)	1342	Public transport Utility vehicle, Jeepney	Nationwide
Metropolitan Manila Development Authority (MMDA)	136	Road traffic safety	Metro Manila
National Grid Corporation of the Philippines (NGCP)	0917-847-6427, 0918-847-6427	Reporting Electricity theft and theft of power line materials	Nationwide
North Luzon Expressway (NLEX)	3-5000	Road traffic safety	Region III
Muntinlupa–Cavite Expressway	(02) 7795-1629	Road traffic safety	Metro Manila
Metro Manila Skyway & NAIA Expressway	(02) 5318-8655	Road traffic safety	Metro Manila
South Luzon Expressway (SLEX)	0917-687-7539	Road traffic safety	Region IV-A
STAR Tollway	043-756-7870	Road traffic safety	Region IV-A
Tarlac - Pangasinan - La Union Expressway	0917-888-0715	Road traffic safety	Region I, Region III
Metro Pacific Tollways Corporation (NLEX / SCTEX / NLEX Connector / CAVITEX / CALAX / CCLEX)	1-35000	Road traffic safety	Nationwide
Department of Tourism (DOT)	1386	Tourism, Tourist Information & Assistance	Nationwide
DOT Tourist Assistance Call Center	151-8687 / 09542533215	Emergency Support Services, Consumer protection & travel guide	Nationwide
Department of Public Works and Highways (DPWH)	16502	Infrastructure, Infrastructure Failure	Nationwide
Department of Energy (DOE)	(632) 8479-2900	Energy supply	Nationwide
National Water Resources Board (NWRB)	(02) 8928-2365 / (02) 8920-2641; (02) 8920-2654	Water supply network	Nationwide
Department of Environment and Natural Resources (DENR)	#3367	Environmental law, Natural resource	Nationwide
Philippine Atmospheric, Geophysical and Astronomical Services Administration (PAGASA)	(02) 8284-0800	Weather, Earthquake, Astronomy	Nationwide
Bangko Sentral ng Pilipinas (BSP)	(+632) 8708-7087	Financial Consumer protection	Nationwide
Securities and Exchange Commission (SEC)	1-4732	Company register	Nationwide
