= Philippine National Police Academy =

Police training academy in the Philippines

- Akademiyang Pambansang Pulisya ng Pilipinas
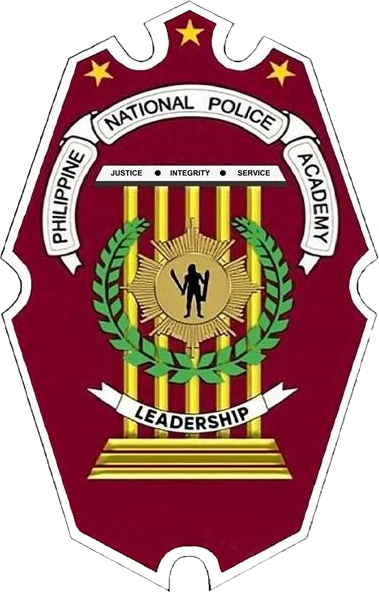
- Motto: To learn today, to lead tomorrow, Justice, Integrity, Service
- Type: Higher education service academy
- Established: June 12, 1978; 48 years ago
- Affiliations: DILG, PPSC (until 2022), PNP, BFP (until 2022), BJMP (until 2022)
- Dean: PCOL Frederick E. Obar
- Director: PMGEN Redrico A. Maranan
- Commandant of cadets: PBGEN Gonzalo C. Villamor
- Location: Silang, Cavite, Philippines; 14°11′54″N 121°01′24″E
- Campus: Urban Camp Mariano N. Castañeda 54 ha (540,000 m^{2})
- Chaplain: PLTCOL Rodolfo J. Ireso
- Hymn: PNPA Alma Mater Song
- Colors: Maroon
- Nicknames: PNPA Lakan/Lakambini "Bok" or "Bords"
- Website: pnpa.edu.ph

The Philippine National Police Academy (Tagalog: Akademiyang Pampulisya ng Pilipinas) or PNPA, is a public safety school and service academy in the Philippines whose graduates are assigned as officers of the Philippine National Police (PNP), And formerly assigned in Philippine Public Safety College (PPSC), Bureau of Jail Management and Penology (BJMP) and the Bureau of Fire Protection (BFP). The PNPA was established on August 26, 1977, under Section 19, PD 1184 and was tasked to provide tertiary level education for Filipinos aspiring to be officers in the three bureaus of the Department of the Interior and Local Government.

== History ==
In the early 1960s, policemen were hired based on personal relations with influential personalities and government officials. After being hired, city and municipal policemen were sworn in and issued weapons. Despite their lack of knowledge, they were given the responsibility of safeguarding and protecting the community.

The organization at the time had no code of conduct. The police service then required neither entry standards nor appropriate training and had no consistent promotional policies. However, substantial improvements were achieved with the passage of Republic Act 4864 on September 6, 1966, known as the “Police Act of 1966”. That law provided for the establishment of the Police Commission which was renamed the National Police Commission under the Office of the President of the Philippines.

Among the powers, duties, and responsibilities of the National Police Commission were to advise the President on all matters involving local police administration, examine and audit the performance, activities, and facilities of all local police agencies throughout the country, promulgate a police manual prescribing rules and regulations for the efficient organization, administration, and operation of the local police, including their recruitment, selection, and promotion, organize and develop police training programs and operate police training centers, and establish a system of Uniform Crime Reporting.

Upon approval of this Police Act, an appointment to a local police agency was made by the mayor from the list of eligible certified by the Civil Service Commission, provided that all appointments were on a probationary basis for six months. After that, an evaluation and recommendation report for retention or termination by the Chief of Police was required before the expiration of the probationary period.

The setup was not without its concomitant pitfalls. The training was limited to police service personnel only. Moreover, the system itself lent to locally based, individualized, and separate local police units that led to the marked preponderance of political influence and interference over the police forces. Mainly for these reasons, the government opted to integrate all city and municipal police, fire, and jail services into a unified national organization.

A series of police integration laws culminated on August 8, 1975, in the promulgation of Presidential Decree (PD) 765 constituting the Integrated National Police or INP, providing for the unification of the then separate city and municipal police, fire, and jail services in existence within the territory of the Republic. These integrated forces were placed under the operational control of the Philippine Constabulary, by itself an Armed Forces of the Philippines Major Service Command, under the responsibility of the Department of National Defense via the office of the Chief of Staff of the Armed Forces through the Chief of Constabulary and this served a nucleus to the new organization.

The new INP was thus made responsible for public safety, protection of lives and properties, enforcement of laws, and maintenance of peace and order within the territorial limits of the Philippines. It had the power to prevent crimes, effect and arrest criminal offenders and provide for their detention and rehabilitation. It took necessary measures to prevent and control fires, investigate the commission of all crimes and offenses, and bring the offenders to justice while taking every necessary step to ensure public safety.

The power of the administrative supervision and control by the city and municipal governments over their respective local police, jail, and fire departments was transferred to the Chief of Constabulary as Director-General of the Integrated National Police in August 1975.

The powers and functions of the National Police Commission in the training of policemen was the establishment of the integrated police communication system, the grant of police salary subsidy, and the adjudication and grant of compensation for temporary disability benefits, which were transferred to the Integrated National Police, including all appropriate personnel and staff, records and equipment and other resources appertaining thereto, except for the powers and functions vested in and exercised by the NPC. Its powers and functions were the attestations of appointments, examination, investigation, adjudication and review of police administrative disciplinary cases, adjudication and grant of compensation for permanent disability and death benefits, staff inspection and audit, which were extended to the police, fire, and jail components of the INP.

=== Creation of the academy ===
Thus, the police, fire, and jail services were unified into a single, paramilitary law enforcement organization and the responsibility of training INP personnel was transferred from the National Police Commission on July 1, 1976, to the Integrated National Police Training Command including the 13 regional training centers throughout the country as mandated by Presidential Decree (PD) 765, signed by then-President Ferdinand Marcos. It was the first step towards the creation of an official officer academy for the aforementioned services.

On August 26, 1977, PD 1184, otherwise known as the “INP Personnel Professionalization Law of 1977”, proposed the creation of the Philippine National Police Academy (PNPA). Immediately after the promulgation of PD 1184, the then chief of Constabulary and concurrently Director General of the Integrated National Police, Major General Fidel V. Ramos (later the President of the Philippines) created a study committee to prepare the corresponding feasibility study and all other prerequisites for the activation of the envisioned PNPA based on PD 1184.

Section 19 of said decree provided that “there shall be established in the Integrated National Police a premiere police service training institution to be known as the Philippine National Police Academy for the education and training of the members of the INP.”

In February 1978, General Ramos recommended to Minister Juan Ponce Enrile, then Minister of National Defense, for the activation of the Philippine National Police Academy. As a result of the recommendation, Ministry of National Defense (MND) Order No. 83 was issued on May 25, 1978, activating the Philippine National Police Academy effective June 12, 1978, in line with the national objective to upgrade the law enforcement service in the country.

=== Opening up to the present ===
Under said Ministry Order, General Orders No. 23-P of Headquarters Philippine Constabulary / Integrated National Police dated June 23, 1978, formally announced the activation of the Philippine National Police Academy (PNPA). The speed that characterized the creation and establishment of the new PNPA indicated the institution's important role in the professional development of police officers in the country. Its actual operations began even before its formal inauguration. It conducted entrance examinations for cadetship on May 28 and June 4, 1978, to select the best applicants for its first batch of cadets.

When the formal inauguration took place on June 30, 1978, the cadets had to share quarters with the INP Training Command at Fort Bonifacio in Makati City for more than two months before it moved to Camp Vicente Lim in Calamba City, Laguna as its training venue on August 19, 1978. The apparent infancy of the academy presented a lack of formal organization, staffing, and a training site. This was, however, resolved by having the Integrated National Police Training Command Headquarters at Fort Bonifacio serve as the surrogate organization of the academy.

Simultaneously with the formal establishment of the academy, the first batch of police cadets was chosen after a rigorous and painstaking selection process – including thorough medical and psychiatric examinations that took place on June 30, 1978. Formal academic instructions started on July 17, 1978, with 50 cadets, in formal ceremonies at Fort Bonifacio on the present Philippine Public Safety College grounds. Two years later, 45 of them finally graduated to compose the first Bachelor of Science in Public Safety (BSPS) graduates – the Maharlika Class of 1980, commissioned Police Lieutenants in Calamba. The traditions of the young academy were adapted from those of the Philippine Military Academy at the behest of Gen Ramos, then Chief of Constabulary, to reflect its status, as the PC supplied some of its personnel as part of academy staff.

During its initial years of existence, the academy limited the admission of its student cadets to the two-year Bachelor of Science in Public Safety (BSPS) for qualified members of the Integrated National Police (INP) only. This meant that applicants outside the Integrated National Police (INP) services were not directly accepted into the cadetship program, given that those holding the rank of Patrolman and above who have been assessed as ready for admission would be granted entry.

When the Philippine National Police Academy was about to complete its third year of existence, the academy modified its admission requirements to include civilian applicants who directly gained their collegiate education there.

On January 15, 1981, less than three years after its establishment, the academy was granted its Academic Charter through the promulgation of Presidential Decree 1780, otherwise known as “The Philippine National Police Academy Charter of 1981.” This decree elevated the academy to the status of the premier educational and training institution of the country's national police force.

Thus, the Philippine National Police Academy was specifically tasked “to develop and conduct comprehensive education and training programs with the view of Professionalizing the personnel in every level of command of the Integrated National Police.”

The 1978 Bachelor of Science in Public Safety (BSPS) curriculum underwent curriculum and training revisions and modifications which brought about the transition from two years to a three-year curriculum, emphasizing the separate specialized areas for cadets who would opt for either the police, fire, or jail services. In 1991, by the enactment of Republic Act 6975, otherwise known as the “Department of the Interior and Local Government Act of 1990”, the INP became part of a new Philippine National Police, while its fire and jail branches were split, becoming both the Bureau of Fire Protection and Bureau of Jail Management and Penology, respectively, all three fall under the Department of the Interior and Local Government. The PNPA remained the official joint officer training institution for the public security services of the republic. Finally, on April 13, 1994, the PNPA found its new and permanent home when it moved to Camp General Mariano N. Castañeda at Silang, Cavite.

By the provisions of RA 6975, The PNPA became a primary component of the Philippine Public Safety College (PPSC), the institution which was mandated as the premier institution for the training, human resource development, and continuing education of all police, fire, and jail personnel.

It was in January 1997, under the leadership of Police Chief Superintendent Rufino G. Ibay Jr. that the proposal to revise the Bachelor of Science in Public Safety (BSPS) course into a four-year program was favorably endorsed by then Philippine Public Safety College (PPSC) President Guillermo P. Enriquez Jr. that led to its eventual approval by the Philippine Public Safety College (PPSC) Board of Trustees which is composed of the Department of the Interior and Local Government (DILG) Secretary as chairman, the head of the Philippine National Police (PNP), Bureau of Fire Protection (BFP) and Bureau of Jail Management and Penology (BJMP) as members, and the Philippine Public Safety College (PPSC) President as an ex-officio member.

Since the academy moved to Camp General Mariano N Castañeda, Silang, Cavite in 1994 as its new and permanent home, its facilities have been continuously upgraded to make the academy conducive for learning.

=== Transition to PNP-only Academy ===
Under the provisions of Republic Act No. 11279 approved on April 12, 2019, the administrative control of the academy, along with the National Police Training Institute, was transferred from the Philippine Public Safety College to the Philippine National Police.

The 2022 creation of the Philippine Public Safety Academy officially ended the 31 year connection of the academy to the other uniformed organizations of the DILG and thus making it a solely PNP-only police academy earmarked for the training of the officers of this institution.

== Curriculum ==
Police Officer candidates attend a 4-year tertiary education course, allowing them to earn a Bachelor of Science Degree in public safety. Graduating cadets are then commissioned as Police Lieutenants, equivalent to a Military First Lieutenant or Lieutenant Junior Grade in the Philippine National Police (PNP). The academic curriculum of the institution is accredited by the Commission on Higher Education.

Until the 2022 opening of the PPSA, officer cadets who graduate as members of the Bureau of Fire Protection or Bureau of Jail Management and Penology carried the rank of Fire/Jail Inspector and receive appropriate commissions of their organization.

== Notable alumni ==
- Nicolas Torre - 31st chief of the Philippine National Police
- Gerald Bantag - Director-General of the Bureau of Corrections
- Jorge Antonio Bustos - representative for Patrol Partylist from 2019 to 2025.

== See also ==
- Philippine Military Academy
- Philippine Merchant Marine Academy
- Philippine National Police
- Philippine Public Safety Academy
- Bureau of Fire Protection
- Bureau of Jail Management and Penology
- National Defense College of the Philippines
- Cadet rank in the Philippines
