= Eric Noble =

Filipino police officer (born 1968)

Police Major General (retired) Eric Noble

Director for Investigation and Detective Management of Philippine National Police
- In office June 26, 2023 – January 16, 2024
- President: Bongbong Marcos
- Preceded by: PMGEN Eliseo DC Cruz
- Succeeded by: PBGEN Rodolfo Castil (OIC)

Personal details
- Born: Eric Escosio Noble
- Education: Philippine Public Safety College (DPSG); Philippine Military Academy (BS); University of San Diego; Lyceum-Northwestern University; Jose Rizal University; FBI National Academy
- Occupation: UNMIK (Kosovo); MINUSTAII (Haiti); Writer
- Awards: Medalya ng Pambihirang Paglilingkod (PNP Special Service Medal); Medalya ng Katangitanging Gawa (PNP Outstanding Achievement Medal); Military Merit Medal; Philippine Republic Presidential Unit Citation; Presidential Lingkod Bayan Award; Country’s Outstanding Policemen in Service (COPS) - 2009; Metrobank Foundation Award for Continuing Excellence and Service (ACES)
- Police Career
- Service: Philippine National Police
- Allegiance: Philippines
- Divisions: Director for Investigation and Detective Management; Philippine National Police Academy; Police Community Affairs and Development Group
- Service years: 1992–2024
- Rank: Police Major General

Eric Escosio Noble is a Filipino retired police officer. He served as Director for Investigation and Detective Management of Philippine National Police from 2023 to 2024.

== Background and education ==
Noble was born in Dagupan City and was raised in Santa Barbara, Pangasinan. In 2024, he earned a post-graduate degree as Doctor of Public Safety and Security Governance at the Philippine Public Safety College. He earned the degree of Bachelor of Science in 1992 at the Philippine Military Academy. He also holds a master's degree in Law Enforcement and Public Safety Leadership from the University of San Diego in 2020, and a bachelor's degree in law from Jose Rizal University in Mandaluyong City. In 2010, he was a student scholar and earned a graduate non-degree course on leadership as part of the Asia-Pacific Leadership Program at the East West Center in Hawaii

He graduated from the FBI National Academy at Quantico, Virginia in 2014 and at the same time earned a graduate certificate in Criminal Justice Administration from the University of Virginia.

== Career ==
He is a Filipino diplomat and an International Peacekeeper, having served as a diplomat in the United States of America as Police Attaché and has served in two (2) United Nations peacekeeping missions: in Kosovo (2000–2001) as part of the United Nations Mission in Kosovo, and in Haiti (2006–2007) as part of MINUSTAII (Mission des Nations Unies pour la stabilisation en Haiti).

He was conferred by the President of the Republic of the Philippines in July 2009 as one of the Country's Outstanding Policemen in Service (COPS) and again in September of the same year as a recipient of the Presidential Lingkod Bayan Award in the nationwide search for outstanding government employees and public officials. Furthermore, he was a recipient of the Award for Continuing Excellence (ACES) medal by the Metrobank Foundation in 2014. In February 2024, he was awarded as PMA Outstanding Alumnus (Cavalier Award for Staff Function) by the Philippine Military Academy Alumni Association.

He became the Director of the Police Community Affairs and Development Group in 2020. Noble acted as the Director of the Philippine National Police Academy from August 2022 to June 2023, where he emphasized the upholding the Honor Code to maintain integrity and reinforced the PNPA's stance against any form of maltreatment. Noble was appointed Director for Investigation and Detective Management of the Philippine National Police in June 2023. He retired from active PNP service in January 2024.

== Awards and honors ==
=== Decorations ===
Noble received more than 135 medals and citations throughout his law enforcement career, including:

- Medalya ng Pambihirang Paglilingkod (PNP Special Service Medal)
- Medalya ng Katangitanging Gawa (PNP Outstanding Achievement Medal)
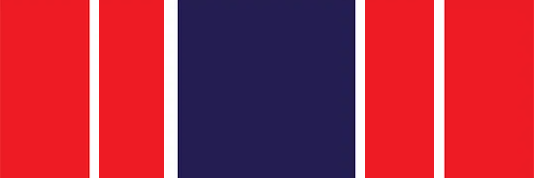
- Medalya ng Kadakilaan (PNP Heroism Medal)
- Medalya ng Kagalingan (PNP Medal of Merit)
- Medalya ng Kasanayan (PNP Efficiency Medal)
- Medalya ng Papuri (PNP Commendation Medal)
- Medalya ng Paglilingkod (PNP Service Medal)
- Medalya ng Katangitanging Asal (PNP Outstanding Conduct Medal)
- Medalya ng Ugnayang Pampulisya (PNP Relations Medal)
- Medalya ng Paglaban sa Manliligalig (PNP Anti-Dissidence Campaign Medal)
- Medalya ng Pagtulong sa Nasalanta (PNP Disaster Relief and Rehabilitation Operations Campaign Medal)
- Medalya ng Paglilingkod sa Mindanao (Mindanao Campaign Medal)
- Military Merit Medal
- Medalya ng Mabuting Asal (PNP Good Conduct Medal)
- Philippine Republic Presidential Unit Citation
- United Nations Medal for Kosovo
- United Nations Medal for Haiti

=== Significant awards ===
- Presidential Lingkod Bayan Award - 2009
- Metrobank Foundation Country's Outstanding Policemen in Service (COPS) - 2009
- Metrobank Foundation Award for Continuing Excellence and Service (ACES) - 2014
- PMAAAI Cavalier Award for Staff Functions - 2024

Political offices
Preceded by PMGEN Alexander Jadoc Sampaga	Philippine National Police Academy; Director; August 2022–June 2023	Succeeded by PBGEN Samuel Camarista Nacion

Political offices
Preceded by PMGEN Eliseo DC Cruz	Directorate for Investigation and Detective Management; Director; June 2023–January 2024	Succeeded by PBGEN Rodolfo Castil (OIC)
