= Jorge Antonio Bustos =

Filipino retired police officer and politician (born 1971)

Jorge Bustos
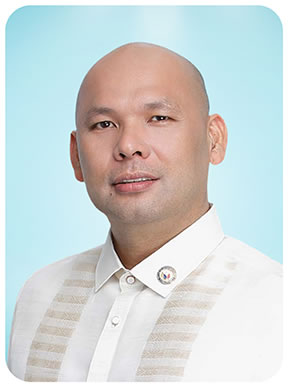
- Official portrait, 2022

Member of the Philippine House of Representatives for Patrol Partylist
- In office June 30, 2019 – June 30, 2025

Personal details
- Born: Jorge Antonio Perez Bustos; March 2, 1971 (age 55) San Fernando, Pampanga, Philippines
- Party: Independent (2024–present); Patrol (partylist; 2015–present)
- Children: 3
- Education: Angeles University Foundation; Philippine National Police Academy (BS)
- Police career
- Service: Philippine National Police
- Service years: 1996–2017
- Rank: Police Superintendent

Jorge Antonio Perez Bustos (born March 2, 1971), also known as Patrol Bustos, is a Filipino retired police officer and politician. He served as representative of the Patrol Partylist from 2019 to 2025.

== Early life and education ==
Bustos was born on March 2, 1971 in San Fernando, Pampanga. He graduated at the Philippine National Police Academy and became as part of the Kaagapay class of 1996. He was classmate of Gerald Bantag, a former corrections officer and jail officer who alleged mastermind for the killing of Percy Lapid in 2022.

== Political career ==
=== House of Representatives (2019–2025) ===
In 2019 elections, Bustos won as nominee of the Patrol Partylist.

In 2025 elections, Bustos ran as 4th District Representative of Pampanga but he lost to Anna York Bondoc over 97,658 votes.

== Personal life ==
His son, Jose Antonio "TonTon" Bustos, who served as mayor of Masantol from 2022 to 2025. He has also a brother Jorge Bustos III, former vice mayor of Masantol who killed inside his security agency office in Angeles City on January 23, 2021.

== Electoral history ==
Electoral history of Jorge Antonio Bustos
Year	Office	Party	Votes received				Result
Year	Office	Party	Total	%	P.	Swing	Result
2019	Representative (Party-list)	Patrol	216,653	0.78%	44th	—N/a	Won
2022	Representative (Party-list)	Patrol	252,571	0.69%	51st	—N/a	Won
2025	Representative (Pampanga–4th)	Independent	105,944	33.99%	2nd	—N/a	Lost
