= Scott Curtis =

Scott Curtis may refer to:

- Scott Curtis (American football) (born 1964), American football linebacker
- Scott Curtis (FBI agent) (fl. 1980s–2020s), American national security analyst and former FBI special agent

== See also ==
- Curtis Scott (born 1997), Australian boxer and rugby league footballer
- Curtis M. Scott (1960–1992), American software architect and board game designer
