= FBI National Academy =

Law enforcement education course in the US

Coordinates: 38.5302°N 77.4459°W

The FBI National Academy is a program of the Federal Bureau of Investigation (FBI) Academy for active U.S. law enforcement personnel and also for international law enforcement personnel who seek to enhance their credentials in their field and to raise law enforcement standards, knowledge, and also cooperation worldwide. The FBI National Academy is held four times a year, when up to 250 candidates go through a 10-week course.

== History ==
The FBI National Academy was started on July 29, 1935, in response to a 1930 study by the Wickersham Commission that recommended the standardization and professionalization of the law enforcement departments across the United States through centralized training. The National Academy is located at the FBI Academy on Marine Corps Base Quantico, Virginia. In 1935 China, Canada, and Great Britain were among the first foreign nations to send candidates for attendance.

== Requirements for admission ==
There are a few specific requirements to get into the FBI National Academy. Candidates have to have been in one of the following groups: leaders and managers of state and local police, sheriffs' departments, military police organizations, and law enforcement agencies. To participate candidates have to be invited through a nomination process. Participants are drawn from every state in the union, from U.S. territories, and from over 160 international partner nations.

Qualified candidates must:

- be a regular, full-time officer of a duly-constituted law enforcement agency of a municipality, county, or state, having at least five years of substantial and continuous experience;
- be at least 25 years old;
- be in excellent physical condition, capable of strenuous exertion and regular participation in the use of firearms, physical training, and defensive tactics, which will be confirmed by a thorough physical examination (submitted when requested by the FBI) by a medical doctor of the nominee's choosing and at the nominee's expense;
- possess an excellent character and enjoy a reputation for professional integrity;
- exhibit an interest in law enforcement as a public service, a seriousness of purpose, qualities of leadership and enjoy the confidence and respect of fellow officers;
- have a high school diploma or high school equivalency certificate; preferably a college diploma;
- have 60 college credit hours or equivalent education experience
- agree to remain in law enforcement for a minimum of three years after graduating from the FBI National Academy.

== Life at the Academy ==
While at the FBI National Academy during the 10-week course there are many different classes including; law, behavioral science, forensic science, the terrorist mindset, communication, health and fitness, and leadership development. Also at the end of the 10-week course there is a final physical exam called the "Yellow Brick Road" which is 6.1 miles in length and has many different obstacles along the way.

== Notable alumni ==
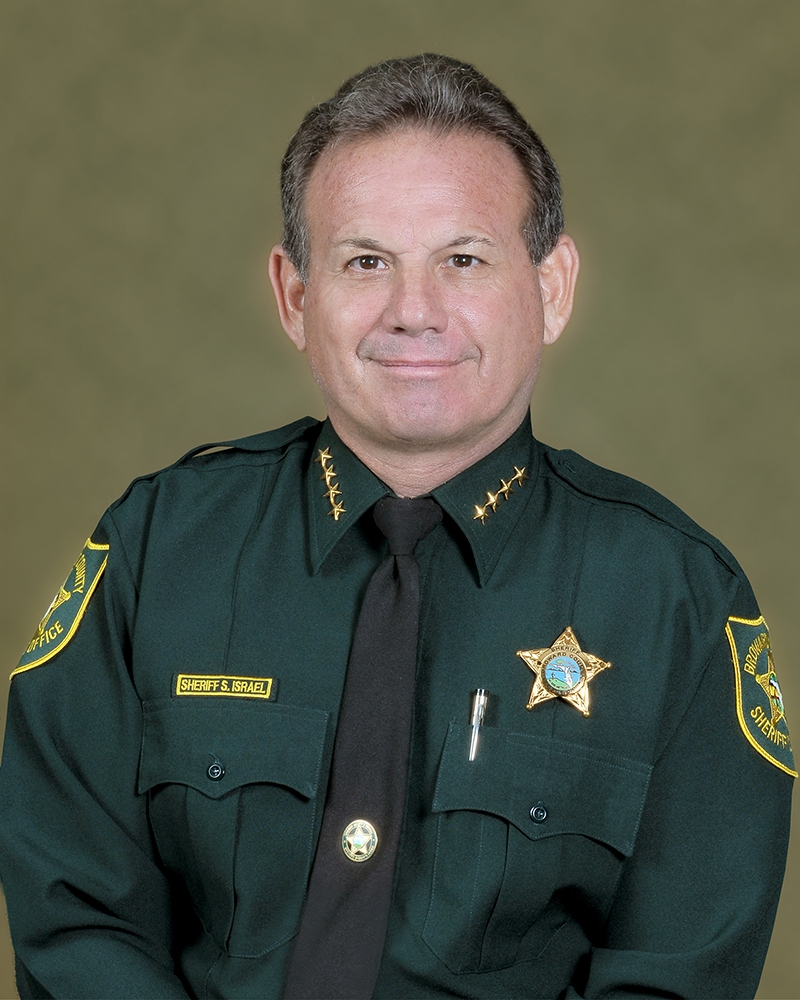
Scott Israel

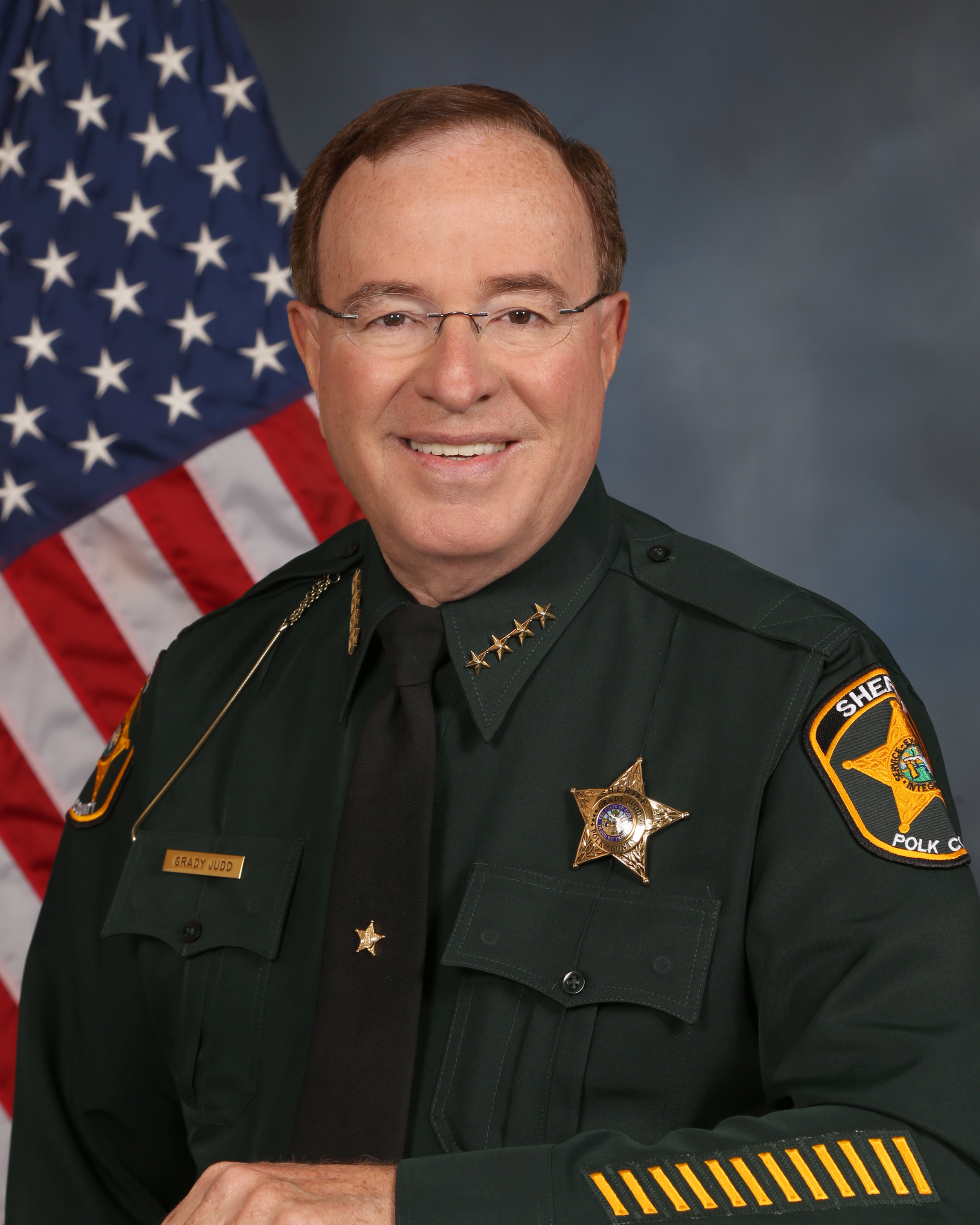
Grady Judd

- David Brown, Superintendent of the Chicago Police Department, former Chief of Police of the Dallas Police Department
- Ron Bolton, member of the Alabama House of Representatives
- Chad Chronister, Sheriff of Hillsborough County, Florida, and former intended nominee for DEA Administrator in 2025
- Scott Curtis (FBI agent), former FBI agent in New York City/Philadelphia and CNN crime and national security analyst
- Vince Deeds, West Virginia State Senator, former West Virginia State Police chief of staff
- Bill Hitchens, member of Georgia House of Representatives, former Georgia State Patrol trooper
- Scott Israel, former sheriff of Broward County, Florida, current police chief of Opa-locka, Florida
- Grady Judd (born1954), sheriff of Polk County, Florida
- Joe Lombardo, 31st governor of Nevada, 17th sheriff of Clark County
- David B. Mitchell, former Delaware Secretary of Safety and Homeland Security, former Secretary of the Maryland State Police
- Patrick V. Murphy, former New York City Police Commissioner, former Chief of the Detroit Police Department
- Christopher L. Paris, 23rd Commissioner of the Pennsylvania State Police
- Charles H. Ramsey, former Commissioner of the Philadelphia Police Department, former Chief of the Metropolitan Police Department of the District of Columbia
- Keechant Sewell, New York City Police Commissioner, former Nassau County Police Department's Chief of Detectives
- John J. Mueller, Chief of the Metropolitan Transportation Authority Police Department, former Commissioner of the Yonkers Police Department
- Eric Noble, Director of the Directorate for Investigative and Detective Management of the Philippine National Police
- Valdecy Urquiza, 9th Secretary-General of Interpol and member of the Federal Police of Brazil
