= Patrol Partylist =

Political party in Philippines

Patrol
- — Philippine partylist —
- Full name: Public Safety Alliance For Transformation and Rule of Law, Inc.
- President: Jose Antonio Bustos
- Sector(s) represented: Public safety workers
- Founder: Jorge Bustos
- Founded: March 2015; 10 years ago
- Colors: Blue, Red

The Public Safety Alliance For Transformation and Rule of Law, Inc., also known as the Patrol Partylist (Note: Sometimes capitalized; PATROL Partylist) is an organization which holds party-list representation in the House of Representatives of the Philippines.

== Background ==
The Public Safety Alliance For Transformation and Rule of Law, also known as Patrol, was formed in May 2015. It was founded by Jorge Bustos who is a retired police superintendent. Bustos hails from Masantol, Pampanga.

The group focuses on public safety as its main platform and is consist of educators, businessmen, lawyers and government workers. It also sought to create legislation aiding public safety front liners such as police personnel and firefighters.

They are linked to the Philippine National Police Academy Alumni Association with most of their nominees at least for the 2022 election. coming from the group.

== Electoral history ==
Patrol first sought party-list representation in the House of Representatives in 2019 election. They were able to win a seat, with Patrol founder Bustos filling in the seat for the 18th Congress.

They were able to retain their seat for the 19th Congress after garnering enough votes in the 2022 election.

== Election results ==
Election	Votes	%	Secured Seats	Party-List Seats	Congress	1st Representative	2nd Representative	3rd Representative
2019	216,653	0.78%	1 / 3	61	18th Congress; 2019–2022	Jorge Antonio Bustos	—	—
2022	252,571	0.69%	1 / 3	63	19th Congress; 2022–2025	Jorge Antonio Bustos	—	—
2025	41,570	0.10%	0 / 3	63	20th Congress; 2025–2028	Failed to secure representation		
Note: For party-list representation in the House of Representatives of the Philippines, a party can win a maximum of three seats.
