= 8888 (Philippines) =

National public service hotline operated by the Government of the Philippines

8888, also known as the Citizens' Complaint Hotline and the President's Hotline, is a 24/7 national public service hotline operated by the government of the Philippines. It was introduced on August 1, 2016, by President Rodrigo Duterte to allow the public to report poor government front-line service delivery and corrupt practices in all government agencies, government-owned and controlled corporations, government financial institutions, and other instrumentalities of the government.

The 8888 Citizens' Complaint Center is managed by the Office of the Executive Secretary which coordinates with the concerned government agency for the prompt resolution of public grievances and to provide feedback on the action taken on citizens' concerns within 72 hours.

A show entitled, Digong 8888 Hotline, was thereafter launched by the People's Television Network in July 2019 to address queries or grievances from the public directed to government agencies, bureaus and offices that are sourced from field interviews, social media, and actual case studies from the hotline and the Presidential Complaint Center. The program, which airs weekly, is also meant for the public to better understand the processes not only of the hotline but also of the featured agency of the week. Digong 8888 Hotline was hosted by Duterte's Chief Legal Counsel and Spokesperson, Secretary Salvador Panelo, Assistant Secretary Kris Roman of the Offices of the Chief Presidential Legal Counsel and Presidential Spokesperson and news anchor, Ms. Trixie Jaafar. It aired until 2022, the year when Duterte's presidency ended.

== History ==
Before the introduction of 8888, citizens seeking to make a complaint about a service provided by a government official would have to dial 1–6565 or the Contact Center ng Bayan (CCB) hotline. Introduced in 2012, the CCB served as the national government's helpdesk providing a public feedback mechanism linking the public and certain frontline government agencies. The CCB was established by the Civil Service Commission (CSC) and the Information and Communications Technology Office–National Computer Center of the Department of Science and Technology to support the implementation of Republic Act 9485 or the Anti-Red Tape Act of 2007. From its inception in 2012 to June 2016, the CSC facilitated a total of 175,481 transactions ranging from calls, e-mails and SMS messages through the Contact Center ng Bayan.

Executive Order No. 6 signed by President Rodrigo Duterte on October 14, 2016

8888 hotline was launched on August 1, 2016 along with the new emergency hotline 9-1-1. On October 14, 2016, President Rodrigo Duterte signed Executive Order No. 6 which institutionalized the hotline and established the 8888 Citizens' Complaint Center. The order placed the contact center under the supervision of the Office of the Cabinet Secretary and also directed the office to provide other communication channels for public complaints, such as SMS, e-mail, website and social networking sites. The order also provides for administrative sanctions to be imposed on government officials who fail to respond timely to the complaints received through the hotline.

As of January 2017, the 8888 Citizens' Complaint Center receives more than 1,000 complaints from the public per day. According to CSC Chairperson Alicia de la Rosa–Bala, the government agencies the complaint center received the most complaints about since its inception in August 2016 were the Social Security System regarding release of pensions and benefits, the Land Transportation Office regarding the issuance of plates and licenses, the Home Development Mutual Fund or PAGIBIG regarding loan grants, the Bureau of Internal Revenue regarding processing of papers, and the Land Registration Authority regarding the issuance of land titles. De la Rosa–Bala said the complaints they have received vary from inaction on submitted applications or requests, slow processing of papers, snubs by civil servants, irritable government employees, fee overcharging, and the presence of "fixers" in government agencies.

Data from the CSC shows that at least half of 8888 calls in 2017 were inquiries, and 200 out of 150,000 calls were complaints on graft and corruption. Only 71,646 out of 94,551 calls were processed in the first half of 2017. The performance audit of the Office of the President reported in 2019 that the hotline answered 646,658 calls, but the Commission on Audit noted that around 792,000 calls were either abandoned on queue or were not received by individual call takers. A SMS line to the 8888 Citizen's Complaint Center was opened in November 2020.
