= Gerald Bantag =

Philippine corrections officer

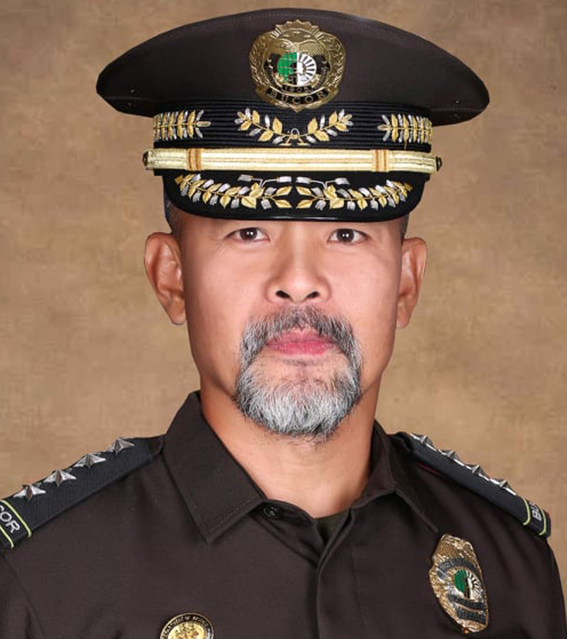
- Official portrait, 2021

Director-General of the Bureau of Corrections
- In office September 20, 2019 – October 21, 2022
- President: Rodrigo Duterte; Bongbong Marcos
- Preceded by: Nicanor Faeldon
- Succeeded by: Gregorio Pio Catapang (acting)

Personal details
- Born: Gerald Quitaleg Bantag Baguio City, Benguet
- Education: Philippine National Police Academy
- Correctional career
- Service: BUCOR; BJMP
- Allegiance: Philippines
- Service years: 1996–present
- Rank: Jail Senior Superintendent
- Criminal information
- Criminal charge: Murder
- Capture status: Fugitive
- Wanted by: Department of the Interior and Local Government (DILG)
- Wanted since: April 14, 2023

Gerald Quitaleg Bantag is a former Filipino corrections officer and retired jail officer who served as Director-General of the Bureau of Corrections. As of July 2023, a manhunt is underway for his capture due to his alleged major role in the killing of Percy Lapid in 2022.

== Education ==
Bantag attended the Philippine National Police Academy (PNPA), where he graduated as part of the Kaagapay class of 1996.

== Career ==
=== Jail warden ===
Bantag has served as warden in Parañaque, Manila, Malabon, Navotas, and Valenzuela.

In August 2007, Bantag was formally accused of attempting to murder a teenager in Caloocan when he was Navotas City Bureau of Jail Management and Penology (BJMP) chief. He denied such allegations.

He also headed the BJMP regional office in Mimaropa.

When Bantag was overseeing the Parañaque City Jail in August 2016, he was injured when a grenade exploded in the prison which also killed 10 detainees. The inmates earlier sought to conduct talks with Bantag regarding their concerns of his supposed plan to move them and conduct an inspection for contrabands.

He was moved to the Manila City Jail after the explosion incident. On October 23, 2016, 30 inmates staged a riot protesting against plans to segregate the 2,000 detainees of the prison charged for drug-related offenses and called for Bantag's removal as warden. They also alleged that under his watch, the Manila prison has started disallowing visitors to bring in food from the outside which meant that they could only buy food from establishments inside the prison which are supposedly more expensive.

=== Bureau of Corrections ===
Bantag was designated as Director General of the Bureau of Corrections (BuCor) by President Rodrigo Duterte on September 17, 2019. He took oath as bureau chief, three days later on September 20. His predecessor Nicanor Faeldon was dismissed for failing to heed to Duterte's order to stop the release of 2,000 heinous crime convicts under the Good Conduct Time Allowance Law. His assumption to the office was under secondment from the BJMP, which meant he retained his previous position with the agency. He would be appointed directly to the BuCor, by Duterte on March 4, 2022. He would take oath again on March 8.

His reappointment meant that he would serve as chief of BuCor even after Duterte's presidency expired. His tenure continued to the President Bongbong Marcos' administration.

==== Killing of Percy Lapid ====
Bantag was implicated to the killing of radio broadcaster and journalist Percy Lapid. President Marcos ordered Justice secretary Jesus Crispin Remulla to place Bantag under preventive suspension for 90 days pending investigation on his role on the killing. The National Bureau of Investigation (NBI) and the Philippine National Police would file charges against several people in connection to Lapid's death including Bantag who was formally charged of murder. Bantag has been subject to criticism by Lapid on his radio program Lapid Fire.

A demonstration was held in Baguio in support of Bantag. Salvador Panelo has raised the possibility that Bantag was framed. Actor Perry de Guzman wrote and directed a film based on Bantag's life titled Heneral Bantag: Anak ng Cordillera (lit. 'General Bantag: Child of Cordillera') in 2023, starring Jason Abalos as Bantag, though the film has yet to be given a release date.

On April 5, 2024, the National Bureau of Investigation raided 2 safe houses in Santa Rosa, Laguna and Caloocan City to serve arrest warrants to Bantag, issued by Muntinlupa Regional Trial Court Branch 206 and Las Piñas RTC Branch 254 but failed.

On December 27, 2025, multiple media outlets began to provide updates on the current status of Bantag. According to the BuCor, Bantag has been in hiding in Kalinga province, under the protection of his tribe.

"He has become like a folklore figure there," said Gregorio Catapang Jr., BuCor director general. "Whether good or bad, you protect your tribe. That is why authorities are cautious in pursuing him, as an operation there could lead to unnecessary conflict," he added.

On May 11, 2026, the Department of the Interior and Local Government (DILG) announced that the International Criminal Police Organization (Interpol) had issued Red Notices against Bantag, along with Atong Ang and Rafael Dumlao III, as fugitives.

== Personal life ==
Bantag is an Igorot. He is married to Olivia Bautista and has a son named Seal.
