= David B. Mitchell (police officer) =

American police chief

- Born: September 17, 1950 (age 75); Pittsburgh, Pennsylvania, U.S.
- Education: University of Maryland University College; University of Maryland, College Park; University of Maryland School of Law; FBI National Academy
- Occupation: Police officer

David B. Mitchell (born September 17, 1950) is an American police chief in Maryland and briefly Delaware.

== Biography ==
Mitchell was born in Pittsburgh, Pennsylvania. His educational background includes a B.S. in management and technology from the University of Maryland University College, a M.A. in public policy from the University of Maryland, College Park, a J.D. from the University of Maryland School of Law, and graduation from the FBI National Academy. Mitchell began his professional career with the Prince George's County Police Department in 1971, rising through the ranks to become Police Chief from 1990 to 1995. He was appointed as Secretary of the Maryland State Police in the Cabinet of Governor Parris Glendening in 1995 serving in that post until 2003.

In June 2004, Mitchell moved to Delaware in order to accept appointment as state Secretary of Safety and Homeland Security in the Cabinet of Governor Ruth Ann Minner, serving in that post until January 2009. Following his return to Maryland, he was appointed as Director of Public Safety and Chief of the University of Maryland Police Department in May 2010.
