= Killing of Percy Lapid =

2022 killing in Las Piñas, Metro Manila

- Location: 14°26′35.4″N 120°59′03.7″E; Las Piñas, Metro Manila, Philippines
- Date: October 3, 2022; 8:30 pm (PHT)
- Target: Percy Lapid
- Weapon: .45 caliber pistol
- Accused: See below

On October 3, 2022, Percy Lapid, a radio journalist and radio broadcaster, was shot dead while on his way home in Las Piñas, Metro Manila, Philippines.

== Percy Lapid ==
Percy Lapid
- Born: Percival Carag Mabasa; March 14, 1959; Quezon City, Philippines
- Died: October 3, 2022 (aged 63); Las Piñas, Metro Manila, Philippines
- Cause of death: Multiple gunshot wounds
- Resting place: Manila Memorial Park – Sucat, Parañaque, Philippines
- Other names: Percy Lapid; Ka Percy; Lapid Fire
- Occupations: Radio broadcaster, columnist
- Years active: 1985–2022
- Employer: DWBL/FBS Radio Network
- Political party: Kilusang Bagong Lipunan (1998)
- Spouse: Liza Santiago
- Children: 6

Percival Carag Mabasa (March 14, 1959 – October 3, 2022), known professionally as Percy Lapid (Tagalog: [ˈpɛɾsi ˈlapid]), was a Filipino journalist and radio broadcaster. He was a critic of President Bongbong Marcos and his predecessor, Rodrigo Roa Duterte. He hosted the radio program Lapid Fire on DWBL, where he tackled cases of corruption. He disclosed irregularities related to the Sugar Regulatory Administration's aborted order to import sugar during a sugar crisis. The scandal faced by the Marcos administration led to the resignation of Vic Rodriguez, the executive secretary of the Sugar Regulatory Administration, in September 2022.

Lapid was a vocal critic of red-tagging, a practice where the government attempts to silence journalists and other dissenters by accusing them of being communists. He was also an outspoken opponent of disinformation in the Philippines and the government's war on drugs.

In addition to serving as host for the DWBL radio network, over a period of almost four decades Lapid was a radio reporter and commentator for DWXI, DZME, DWBC, DZRM, DWIZ, and DZRJ, and a columnist for the tabloid Hataw.

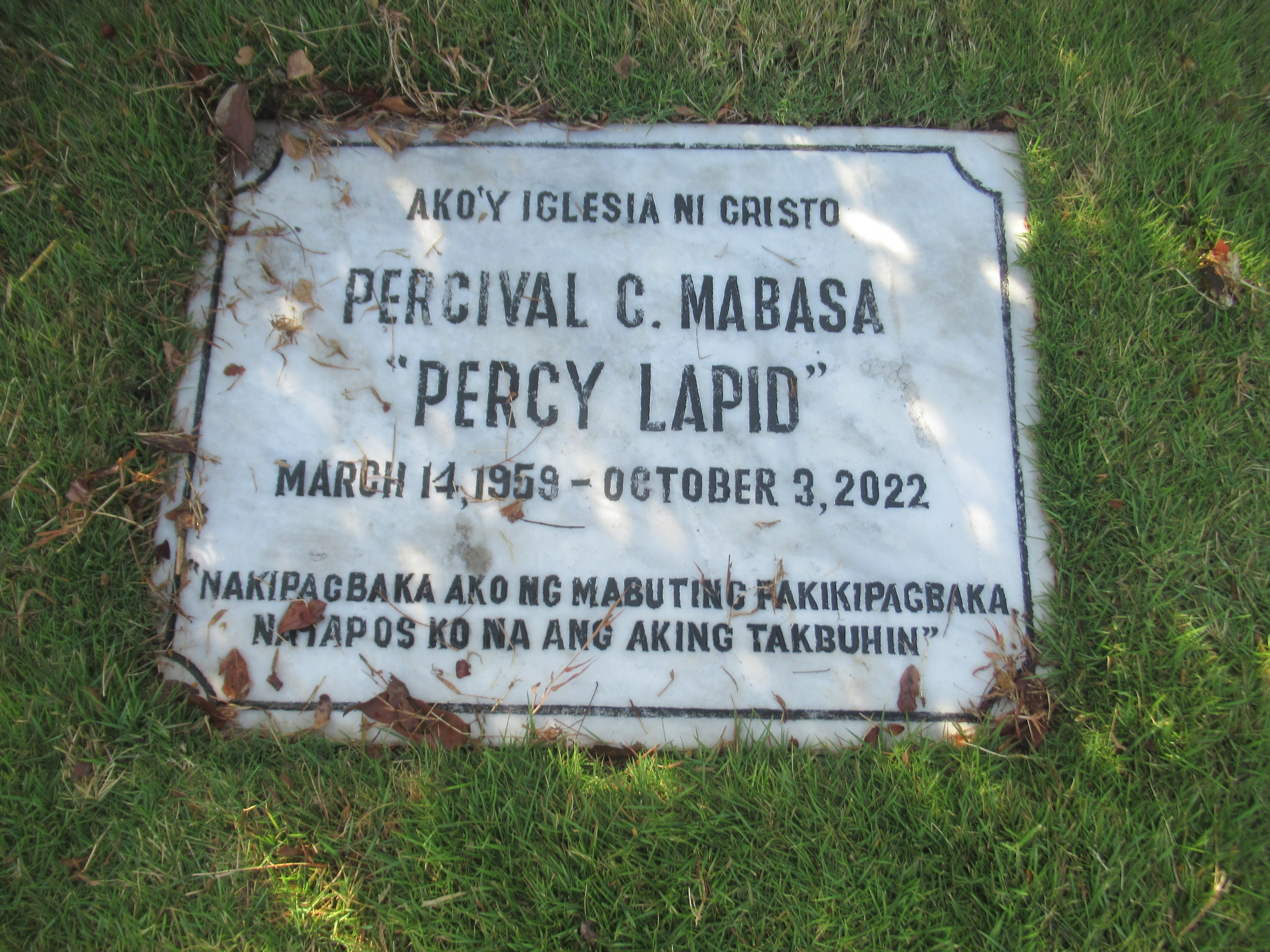
Percival Carag Mabasa's grave at Manila Memorial Park – Sucat.

== Assassination ==
Percy Lapid was killed on October 3, 2022, at around 8:30 pm (UTC+8) while he was driving home to BF Resort Village, a gated community in Las Piñas. There was a traffic buildup at the subdivision's gate near Aria Street in Barangay Talon 2 because of the routine inspection of all vehicles for a sticker required for entry into the subdivision. A motorcycle with two people riding it approached Lapid's vehicle in the queue, and the gunman from the motorcycle fired two shots at Lapid, killing him instantly. Lapid's vehicle was about 50 meters (160 ft) from the gate when the shooting occurred.

Lapid was the third journalist in the Philippines to be killed in 2022, according to data from UNESCO, and the second during the presidency of Bongbong Marcos, according to the National Union of Journalists of the Philippines.

== Perpetrators ==
Witnesses saw two men on a motorcycle carry out the killing. The police identified one "person-of-interest", a man wearing a pink jacket who was walking near the Las Piñas City Hall, about five minutes from Lapid's home. Department of the Interior and Local Government Secretary Benhur Abalos believed that the killer was a professional gunman.

Joel Escorial surrendered to the authorities on October 17, 2022, and confessed to being the gunman in Lapid's killing. He implicated brothers Edmon and Israel Dimaculangan as his partners in crime, and stated that they received orders from an individual named "Orlando" or "Orly", who in turn answered to another person who was incarcerated in the New Bilibid Prison, later identified as Jun Villamor. (Note: Name varies by source: Department of Justice (DOJ) statement: Crisanto Palana Villamor; Bureau of Corrections: Jun Globa Villamor; DOJ Secretary Jesus Crispin Remulla: Jun Garcia Villamor) Christopher Bacoto, also known as Jerry Sandoval, was alleged to have been another middleman who tasked Escorial, the Dimaculangan brothers, and "Orly", with the killing of Lapid.

The Philippines' National Bureau of Investigation (NBI) and the Philippine National Police (PNP) filed charges against several people in connection with Lapid's death, including Bureau of Corrections Director General Gerald Bantag, who was formally charged with murder. Bantag maintained his innocence and alleged that drug lord German Agojo was responsible for the killing.

In March 2023, the Department of Justice indicted a total of seventeen individuals over the killing of Lapid and the subsequent murder of Jun Villamor. Double murder charges were filed separately before the Regional Trial Courts of Muntinlupa (in the case of Villamor, on March 13) and Las Piñas (in the case of Lapid, on March 14). The panel of prosecutors said it found probable cause to charge Bantag and his deputy, Sr. Supt. Ricardo Zulueta, as "principals by inducement". Also indicted as principals were:

- Two "persons deprived of liberty" (PDLs) involved in both cases (by indispensable cooperation in Lapid's case; by inducement in Villamor's case).
- In Lapid's case: four by direct participation, including Escorial; three more PDLs by indispensable cooperation.
- In Villamor's case: six PDLs by direct participation.

In April, Muntinlupa Regional Trial Court Branch 266 issued an arrest warrant for Bantag and Zulueta for the murder of Villamor. Las Piñas RTC Branch 254 issued the same for those two as well as the Dimaculangan brothers and alias Orly/Orlando for the murder of Lapid. The manhunt for them is ongoing.

Lawyers filed a petition before the Court of Appeals on behalf of Bantag and Zulueta on July 10 (but made public about a month later) asking them to nullify the indictment by the Department of Justice along with the entire preliminary investigation conducted by the DOJ. Bantag claimed that the Ombudsman could do so since the Sandiganbayan appellate court had jurisdiction over him, as a public official. Bantag claimed that there was no evidence linking him to the death of Lapid.

Zulueta reportedly died due to heart failure (cerebrovascular disease intracranial hemorrhage according to his death certificate) at the Bataan Peninsula Medical Center in Dinalupihan, Bataan, on March 15, 2024. The PNP later said there was no foul play in his death, while the DOJ ordered the NBI to investigate the circumstances surrounding his death. In May, the Las Piñas RTC ordered Zulueta's counsel to address the prosecution's request for an autopsy.

On April 5, the NBI raided two safe houses in Santa Rosa and Caloocan cities in an unsuccessful attempt to arrest Bantag.

After a manhunt operation for alleged Escorial's accomplice, alias Orly, on August 11, the subject fatally shot himself after holding his family hostage in a rented room during a police operation in Lipa, Batangas. He was later variously identified as Jake Mendoza and Orlando Almanor.

== Investigation ==
The Philippine National Police (PNP) and the Commission on Human Rights opened investigations into the killing. The PNP reviewed CCTV cameras along the known route taken by Lapid, the dashcam on the victim's vehicle, and Lapid's cellphone, and interviewed the victim's family. The PNP's National Capital Region Police Office stated that they had not found any evidence on Lapid's cellphone and that Lapid's family was not aware of any threats to the journalist's life. The police did not determine a motive for the killing.

When Joel Escorial surrendered to authorities on October 17, 2022, he named Jun Villamor as his contact inside the New Bilibid Prison. Villamor died on October 18. The Bureau of Corrections' initial investigation concluded that Villamor died of natural causes and not as a result of foul play. The National Bureau of Investigation (NBI) conducted an autopsy and found no signs of external injury on Villamor's body. This was, however, contradicted by the findings of a second autopsy conducted by forensic pathologist Raquel Fortun, who concluded that Villamor died of suffocation from a plastic bag.

President Marcos ordered Justice Secretary Jesus Crispin Remulla to place Bureau of Corrections Director General Gerald Bantag under preventive suspension for 90 days pending investigation of his role in the killing. From sworn statements from certain "persons deprived of liberty" (PDLs) the NBI established that there was a direct line of communication between Bantag and deputy security officer Ricardo Zulueta and Escorial through middlemen Alvin Labra and gang leader Aldrin Galicia. Lapid's criticism of Bantag on his radio program Lapid Fire was cited as a possible motive for the killing.

== Trial status ==
For the murder of Percy Lapid, four of five co-accused charged as principals by indispensable cooperation, all NBP PDLs, have been convicted by the Las Piñas RTC through plea bargaining where they pleaded guilty as accessories to the crime, and sentenced to 2–8 years imprisonment. They are Aldrin Galicia, Alvin Labra and Alfie Peñaredonda, all NBP gang leaders, on June 23, 2023; and Denver Mayores, reportedly Bantag's aide, on December 4. The trial of another alleged accomplice, Christoper Bacoto, is yet to be concluded.

Escorial, also through a plea bargain deal, asked the court to downgrade his case from murder to homicide, as well as to lower his penalty; and in May 2024, he was given a prison sentence of 8 years, 8 months to 16 years.

For the killing of Villamor, all eight accused PDLs pleaded guilty of being accomplices and accessories in the murder. On June 27, 2023 the Muntinlupa RTC Branch 206 gave prison sentences to five of them ranging from six years and a day to at least 14 years, and sentenced the rest, including Labra and Galicia, both indicted as principal inducement, to between two years and eight years and a day.

On the same day, the court issued an order archiving the case against Bantag and Zulueta, pending their arrest for the death of Villamor.

== Reactions ==
=== Initial reactions ===
Lapid's killing received condemnation both domestically and internationally from foreign governments and media organizations. Media watchdogs and human rights organizations noted that the Philippines is one of the most dangerous countries in the world for journalists. According to the Committee to Protect Journalists' Global Impunity Index, 85 journalists were killed in the Philippines from 1992 to 2021, making the Philippines the seventh worst country in the world in terms of the number of journalists murdered, with most of their killers going unpunished.

The killing was called an attack on press freedom by some observers, such as former Vice President Leni Robredo and lawmakers Risa Hontiveros, Robin Padilla, France Castro, and Neri Colmenares. The killing has had a chilling effect on the media, according to media watchdogs and other observers.

Department of the Interior and Local Government Secretary Benhur Abalos offered ₱500 thousand of his own money to anyone who could provide information that would aid the investigations into the incident. As of October 10, 2022, the cash bounty stood at ₱6.5 million, with ₱1 million from lawyer, businessman and Partido Federal ng Pilipinas Manila Chapter chairman Alex Lopez and ₱5 million contributed by members of the House of Representatives.

The killing of Percy Lapid was condemned by the Director-General of UNESCO Audrey Azoulay in a press-release published on 6 October 2022. UNESCO’s mandate to “promote the free flow of ideas by word and image” includes the protection of journalists and media workers from attacks and reprisals. The facts and circumstances surrounding the killing are categorized and archived online in UNESCO’s Observatory of Killed Journalists. The Observatory archives publicly accessible information on all the journalists killed in relation to their duties since 1997.

=== Charging of Gerald Bantag ===
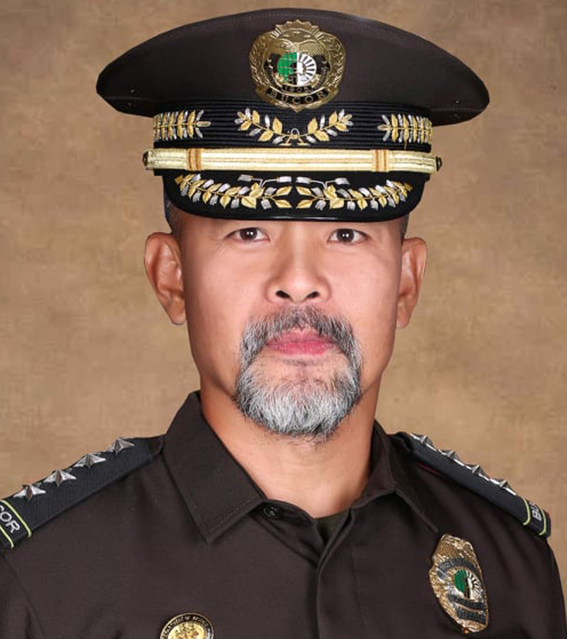
Usec. Gerald Bantag

President Bongbong Marcos expressed concern over Gerald Bantag's involvement in the case, remarked that he had established "his own fiefdom" in the prison while he was Bureau of Corrections chief, and vowed that investigations of the case will continue. Bantag expressed doubt that Marcos was being provided truthful information regarding the case and urged Justice Secretary Jesus Crispin Remulla to step down. Bantag accused him of manufacturing a motive in order to implicate him.

On May 11, 2026, Bantag was among three fugitives for whom a Red Notice had been issued by the International Criminal Police Organization (Interpol), according to the Department of the Interior and Local Government (DILG).

== See also ==
- Killing of Juan Jumalon
