= Scott Curtis (FBI agent) =

Former FBI special agent

- Born: Scott R. Curtis; Elizabeth, New Jersey, U.S.
- Education: United States Military Academy, FBI Academy, FBI National Academy
- Occupations: Former FBI agent, national security analyst, investigator
- Notable credit(s): National security and crime commentary: CNN NewsNight, Today (Australia), Anderson Cooper 360°, WFMZ-TV

Gymnastics career
- Discipline: Men's artistic gymnastics
- College team: Army Black Knights (1986–1990)
- Gym: Parkettes National Gymnastics Training Center
- Retired: c. 1990
- Website: https://www.scottcurtisconsulting.com

Scott R. Curtis is an American national security analyst, investigator, and former FBI special agent known for leading high-profile investigations into organized crime and political corruption. He played a significant role in dismantling the Colombo crime family in New York and later transferred to Allentown, Pennsylvania to investigate corruption in Pennsylvania municipalities including Allentown and Reading. After retiring from the FBI, Curtis was hired to investigate workplace harassment and discrimination in Allentown.

== Early life and education ==
Curtis trained in competitive gymnastics as a teenager at the Parkettes National Gymnastics Training Center in Allentown, Pennsylvania, commuting from New Jersey several times each week to practice. He enrolled at the United States Military Academy at West Point, where he earned a gymnastics scholarship. He was a member of the Army Black Knights men's gymnastics for four seasons, from 1986 through 1990, and served as team captain for his senior year. Upon graduation in May 1990, he served for five years as a United States Army infantry officer.

== Career ==
=== Organized crime investigations ===
Curtis joined the FBI in 1996 and was assigned to the organized crime squad in the New York City field office. He first gained national recognition for his work in the 2000s and 2010s, targeting organized crime in New York. He was the lead agent in the 2011 effort to dismantle the Colombo crime family, helping to prosecute more than 100 gangsters and persuading at least a dozen members to become government informants. Former Deputy U.S. Attorney General Greg Andres credited Curtis with significantly diminishing the power of the Colombo family through his investigations, and newspapers called him "the scourge of the Colombo crime family." He is also credited with spearheading the largest single-day takedown of organized-crime members in U.S. history, 127 arrests on January 20, 2011. That June, following the dismantling of Colombo family leadership, FBI Director Robert Mueller formally recognized Special Agent Curtis for his "hard work" and "significant role in the success achieved in this case" in an officially archived agency determination internally routed through the Bureau's command.

=== Corruption investigations in Pennsylvania ===
In 2013, Curtis transferred to the FBI's Allentown field office, seeking a change of pace after 15 years of organized crime investigation. After transferring to Pennsylvania, Curtis led FBI investigations into public corruption in Allentown and Reading. From 2013 to 2018, he directed a sweeping FBI probe into former Allentown Mayor Ed Pawlowski's administration. The investigation uncovered a pay-to-play scheme in which city contracts were awarded to firms that donated to Pawlowski’s campaign for U.S. Senate. Evidence was gathered through intercepted emails, recorded conversations, and raids on City Hall. In one colorful episode, Curtis testified in Pawlowski's trial that he had initially believed that another investigation subject's frequent references to meatballs were code for some kind of payoff, but later concluded that the person actually just had a particular liking for meatballs. Pawlowski was convicted on 47 criminal charges and sentenced to 15 years in federal prison.

Curtis also led the investigation into Reading Mayor Vaughn Spencer, who was found guilty on 11 federal criminal charges related to pay-to-play schemes. Spencer was sentenced to eight years in prison.

=== Allentown discrimination probe ===
In June 2024, Allentown City Council voted 6–1 to hire Curtis to conduct an independent investigation into allegations of racism and discrimination within city government. The allegations were made in 2023 by the Allentown NAACP after it received complaints from 10 city employees about the culture of racism within the city government. Council set a budget of $300,000 for the investigation and granted Curtis subpoena power to compel testimony. During the investigation, the city council sued the mayor and finance director of the city, alleging they were attempting to block the investigation.

Despite Curtis having conducted more than 100 interviews, the Allentown City Council voted to terminate the investigation in January 2025.

=== Public commentary ===
In July 2024, following the attempted assassination of former President Donald Trump, Curtis spoke in an interview about the importance of public vigilance and governmental transparency in identifying extremist threats. He urged that law enforcement should inform the public about warning signs of violence and emphasized the role of everyday citizens in preventing attacks. He has also appeared on CNN as a national security analyst and on CBS News, also giving commentary for publications such as The Wall Street Journal.
