= Revised Fire Code of the Philippines of 2008 =

Fire safety law in the Philippines

The Revised Fire Code of the Philippines of 2008

14th Congress of the Philippines
- Long title: An Act Establishing a Comprehensive Fire Code of the Philippines, Repealing Presidential Decree No. 1185 and For Other Purposes
- Citation: Republic Act No. 9514; Presidential Decree No. 1185 s. 1977
- Territorial extent: Philippines
- Enacted by: House of Representatives
- Enacted by: Senate
- Signed: December 19, 2008
- Effective: January 3, 2009

Legislative history

Initiating chamber: House of Representatives
- Bill title: "An Act Amending Presidential Decree No. 1185 Otherwise Known as the "Fire Code of the Philippines" and For Other Purposes"
- Bill citation: House Bill No. 4115
- Introduced by: Darlene Magnolia Antonino-Custodio (Legislative district of South Cotabato#1st District)
- Introduced: May 12, 2008
- First reading: May 19, 2008
- Second reading: May 27, 2008
- Third reading: June 11, 2008
- Committee report: House Committee on Public Order and Safety Report No. 512

Revising chamber: Senate
- Bill title: "An Act Amending Presidential Decree No. 1185, Otherwise Known as the Fire Code of the Philippines, and For Other Purposes"
- Bill citation: Senate Bill No. 2553
- Member(s) in charge: Francis Escudero, Miriam Defensor Santiago, Bong Revilla, Manny Villar, Gregorio Honasan, and Benigno Aquino III
- First reading: September 3, 2008
- Second reading: September 29, 2008
- Third reading: October 6, 2008
- Committee report: Senate Committee on Public Order and Illegal Drugs Report No. 94
- Conference committee bill passed by House of Representatives: October 8, 2008
- Conference committee bill passed by Senate: October 6, 2008

Repeals
- Presidential Decree No. 1185, s. 1977
- Status: In force

The Revised Fire Code of the Philippines of 2008, officially codified as Republic Act No. 9514, is a consolidation of Senate Bill No. 2553 and House Bill No. 4115, enacted and passed by the Senate and the House of Representatives on October 6, 2008, and October 8, 2008, respectively. It was signed into law by President Gloria Macapagal Arroyo on December 19, 2008.

This Act repealed Presidential Decree No. 1185, as amended, otherwise known as the "Fire Code of the Philippines", dated August 26, 1977.

R.A. No. 9514 and R.A. No. 6975 designated and empowered the Bureau of Fire Protection as the implementing arm of the Department of the Interior and Local Government for fire control and protection, fire inspection, investigation, and search and rescue. It also penalizes acts of obstruction of emergency exits, fire hydrants and fire lanes, overcrowding, locking fire exits, smoking in fire hazard areas, the removing, destroying, obliterating, any authorized seals, signs, mark or tags, and the tampering, overloading and/or destruction of electrical wires.
