= National Commission of Senior Citizens =

Philippine government agency

- Seal

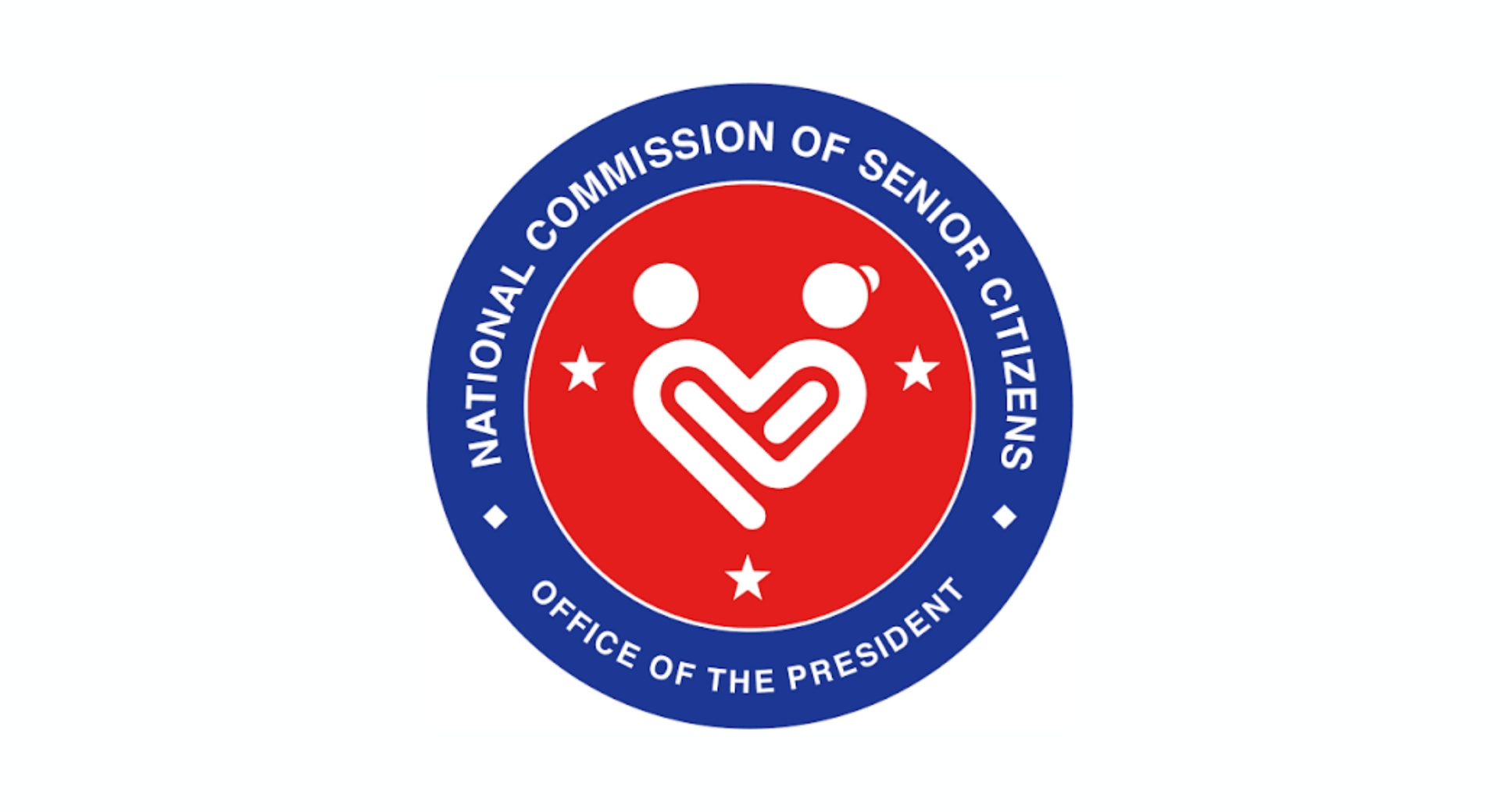
- Flag

Agency overview
- Formed: July 25, 2019
- Jurisdiction: Government of the Philippines
- Headquarters: 20th Floor, The Upper Class Tower, Quezon Avenue corner Scout Reyes, Barangay Paligsahan, Quezon City, Philippines
- Annual budget: ₱3.5 billion (2026) ▲
- Agency executive: Merceditas Gutierrez, Chairperson and CEO
- Parent agency: Department of Social Welfare and Development
- Website: ncsc.gov.ph

The National Commission of Senior Citizens (NCSC) is a Philippine government agency created in 2019 that is responsible for overseeing and caring for the welfare of Filipino senior citizens. In 2025, the commission was detached from the Office of the President and was placed under the Department of Social Welfare and Development.

== History ==
During hearings in the Senate of the Philippines in January 2019, the Commission on Population and Development underscored the need for a commission focused on elderly affairs, citing projections that the Philippines would have an aging population in the first half of the 2030s. In response, Francisco Datol Jr. of the Senior Citizens Partylist filed House Bill No. 8837 in the House of Representatives, proposing the creation of the commission. The counterpart measure in the Senate, Senate Bill 2159, was sponsored by Senator Antonio Trillanes.

The measure became law on July 25, 2019, when President Rodrigo Duterte signed Republic Act No. 11350, creating the National Commission of Senior Citizens (NCSC).

The NCSC, in coordination with the Department of Information and Communications Technology (DICT), launched the National Senior Citizens ID (NSCID), a digital identity card for senior citizens in August 2025.

President Bongbong Marcos issued Executive Order No. 96 on September 18, 2025, placing the NCSC under the supervision of the Department of Social Welfare and Development (DSWD) and detaching it from the Office of the President. The executive order maintained that the DSWD should remain responsible for managing the Social Pension for Indigent Senior Citizens (SPISC) program despite a mandate requiring the transfer of the program to the NCSC within three years of the effectivity of RA 11350.

== Composition ==
The National Commission of Senior Citizens is composed of the following:

- Chairperson and the Chief Executive Officer
- Commissioners (from Commissioner I to Commissioner VI)

The law gave the NCSC unique positions to ensure that the chairperson and its commissioners work with each other to strengthen coordination and support.

The chairperson shall oversee the NCSC in the development, administration, and management of programs.

The commissioners, on the other hand, help the chairperson in creating policies and frameworks to make the launching of such guidelines and other materials simpler.

== Appointment ==
To become a member of the NCSC, Section 6 of Republic Act No. 11350 states:

- Must be at least 60 years old and above at the time of appointment;
- Of good moral character;
- Bonafide members of senior citizens associations;
- Be in good health and sound-mind;
- Have not been convicted by a final judgment of a crime involving moral turpitude;
- Recommended by a general assembly of senior citizens organizations;

and at least two (2) commissioners must be women.

The President of the Philippines appoints the chairperson and the commissioners, all of whom serve a term of 6 years. The first appointments served special terms in which the chairperson and 2 commissioners would hold office for the full 6-year term, 2 commissioners would serve for 4 years, and 2 commissioners would serve for 2 years. If an appointment is made to a vacancy, the term would only consist of the remaining term of the predecessor.

== Powers ==
The NCSC was granted the power to:

- Establish strategies to increase the programs involving senior citizens.
- Make rules and regulations on proper joining of benefit programs, registering for identification cards (IDs), and other matters.
- Evaluate the welfare of all senior citizens to ensure that they aren't abused or mistreated by such establishments and other people.
- Enforce discounts for special senior citizens (e.g., persons with disability or PWD), as mandated by the Expanded Senior Citizens Act of 2010 (Republic Act No. 9994), which gives them a 20% discount on primary services (e.g., medical, transportation, etc.) and a VAT exemption.
- Coordinate with other government agencies for implementing such policies and programs regarding the benefit of senior citizens.

== Chairpersons ==
#	Image	Chairperson	Term began	Term ended	President	Ref.
1		Franklin Quijano	2019	08 October 2024	Rodrigo Duterte	
1		Franklin Quijano	2019	08 October 2024	Bongbong Marcos	
-		Mary Jean Loreche	Unclear; was Officer in Charge as early as February 2025		Bongbong Marcos	
2		Merceditas Gutierrez	November 4, 2025	Incumbent	Bongbong Marcos	
