= Bureau of Jail Management and Penology =

Philippine government agency responsible for district, city, and municipal jails

- Kawanihan ng Pamamahala ng Bilangguan at Penolohiya
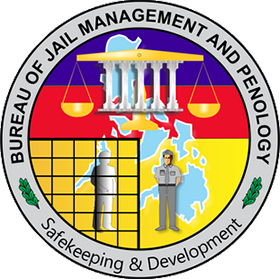
- Seal

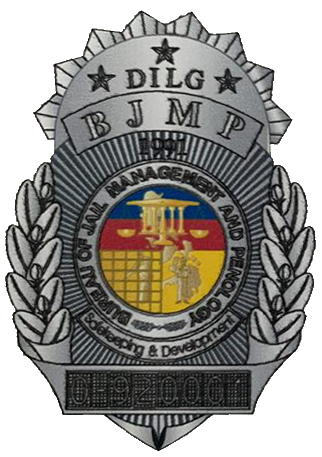
- Badge

Agency overview
- Formed: January 2, 1991; 35 years ago
- Jurisdiction: Government of the Philippines
- Headquarters: 144 Mindanao Avenue, Project 8., Quezon City, NCR 1106 Philippines
- Motto: "Changing lives, building a safer nation"
- Employees: 21,087 (2024)
- Annual budget: ₱22.33 billion (2023)
- Agency executives: J/Dir Ruel S. Rivera, DSC, Chief, BJMP; JCSupt. Dennis U. Rocamora, CESE, Deputy Chief for Administration; JCSupt. Efren A. Nemeño, DPA, TLPE, Deputy Chief for Operations; JCSupt. Isabelo V. Cartin Jr., Chief, BJMP Directorial Staff
- Parent agency: Department of the Interior and Local Government
- Website: www.bjmp.gov.ph

The Bureau of Jail Management and Penology (BJMP; Filipino: Kawanihan ng Pamamahala ng Bilangguan at Penolohiya) is an attached agency of the Department of the Interior and Local Government mandated to direct, supervise and control the administration and operation of all district, city and municipal jails in the Philippines with pronged tasks of safekeeping and development of its inmates, officially classed as persons deprived of liberty (PDL).

== History ==
The agency was created on January 2, 1991, by virtue of Republic Act No. 6975, also known as the Department of the Interior and Local Government Act of 1990. Prior to its creation, the Office of Jail Management and Penology of then Philippine Constabulary - Integrated National Police was the agency handling the local penology of the Philippines. It aimed to separate the agency from the national police, reporting directly to the Secretary of the Interior and Local Government.

== Operations ==
The Jail Bureau, pursuant to Section 60 to 65, Chapter V, Republic Act No. 6975 amended by Republic Act No. 9263 (Bureau of Fire Protection and Bureau of Jail Management and Penology Professionalization Act of 2004), is headed by a Chief who is assisted by two Deputy Chiefs, one for Administration and another for Operations, and one Chief of Directorial Staff, all of whom are appointed by the President upon the recommendation of the Secretary of the Interior and Local Government from among the qualified officers with the rank of at least Senior Superintendent in the Jail Bureau. The Chief of the Jail Bureau carries the rank of Director and serves a tour of duty that must not exceed four years, unless extended by the President in times of war and other national emergencies.

The Jail Bureau operates and maintains Regional Offices in each of the administrative regions of the country, headed by a Regional Director for Jail Management and Penology, with the rank of at least Senior Superintendent. The Regional Director is assisted by an Assistant Regional Director for Administration, Assistant Regional Director for Operations, and Regional Chief of Directorial Staff, who are all officers with the rank of at least Superintendent.

In every province, the Jail Bureau operates and maintains a Provincial Jail Administrator's Office headed by a Provincial Administrator, who oversee the implementation of jail services of all district, city and municipal jails within its territorial jurisdiction. In large cities or a group of clustered municipalities, a District Jail headed by a District Warden may be established. The City and Municipal Jails, each headed by a City or Municipal Warden.

== Mandates and functions ==
=== Mandate ===
BJMP is mandated to direct, supervise and control the administration and operation of all district, city and municipal jails nationwide with pronged tasks of safekeeping and development of the Persons Deprived of Liberty (PDLs).

=== Functions ===
In line with its mission, the Jail Bureau endeavors to perform the following functions:

- Formulate policies and guidelines in the administration of all district, city, and municipal jails nationwide.
- Implement strong security measures for the control of PDL.
- Provide for the basic needs of PDL.
- Conduct activities for the development of PDL.
- Improve jail facilities; and
- Promote the general welfare and development of personnel.

== Organizational Structure ==
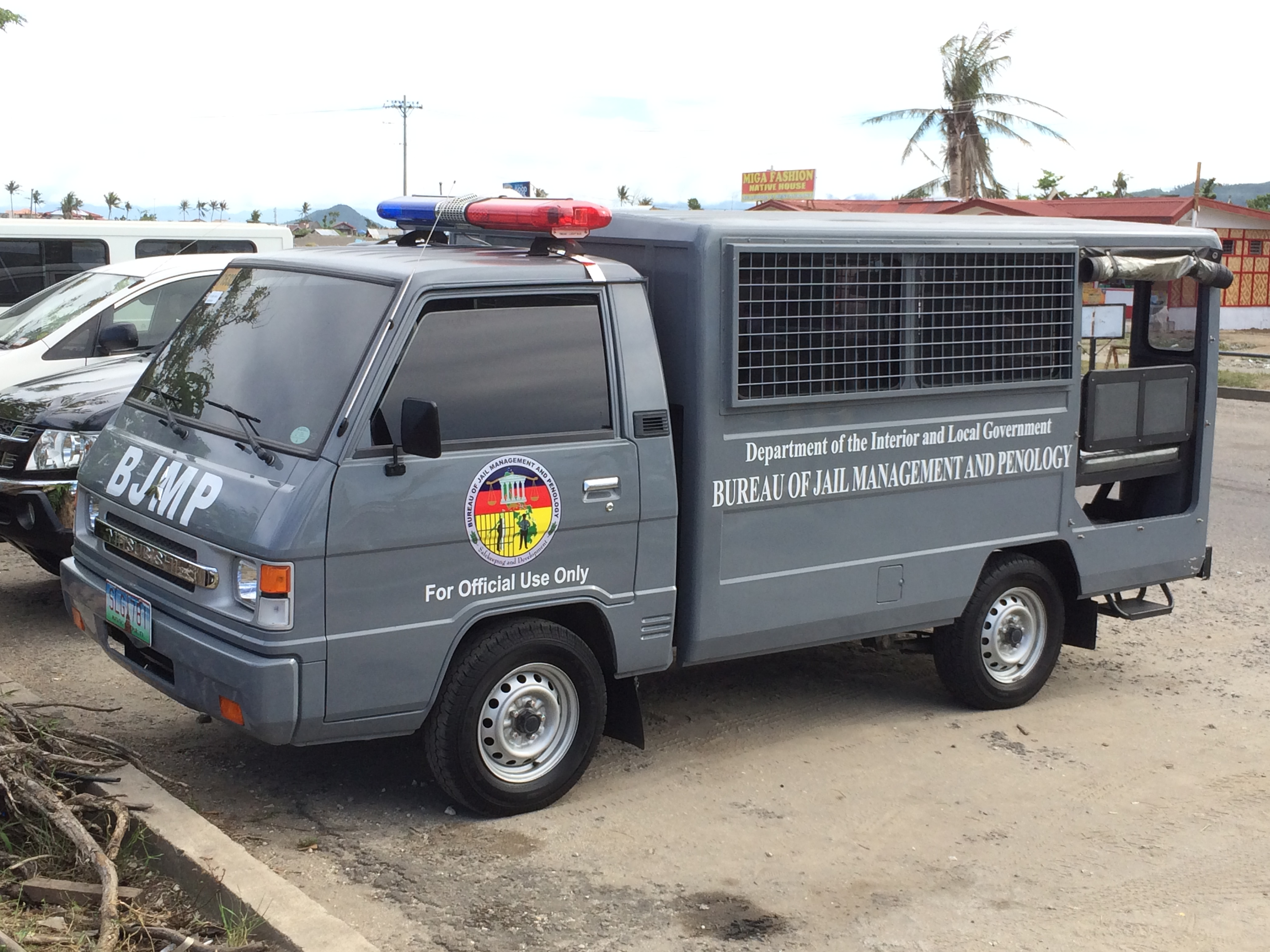
A Mitsubishi L-300 FB Prisoner Transport Vehicle in Tacloban

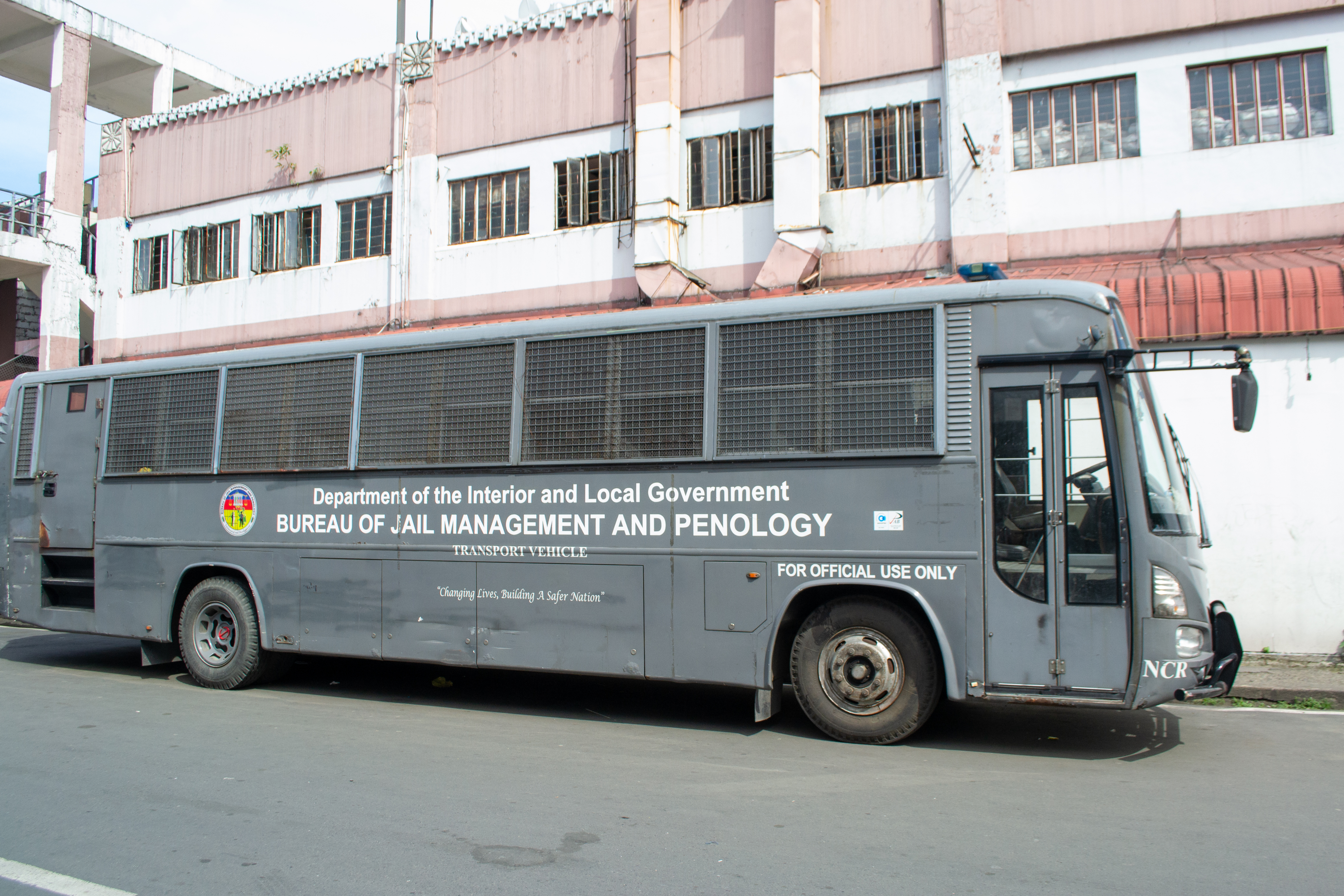
A Bureau of Jail Management and Penology transport bus

The current leadership within the bureau is as follows:

- Commander-in-Chief: Pres. Bongbong Marcos
- Secretary of the Interior and Local Government (SILG): Hon. Juanito Victor C. Remulla
  - Undersecretary for Peace and Order, DILG: Nestor B. Sanares
- Chief, Bureau of Jail Management and Penology (C, BJMP): JDir. Ruel S. Rivera, DSC
- The Deputy Chief for Administration (TDCA, BJMP): JCSupt. Dennis U. Rocamora, CESE
- The Deputy Chief for Operations (TDCO, BJMP) : JCSupt. Efren A. Nemeño, DPA, TLPE
- The Chief, BJMP Directorial Staff (TDCS, BJMP) : JCSupt. Isabelo V. Cartin Jr.

The National Headquarters is composed of:

- Office of the Chief, BJMP
- Office of the Deputy Chief for Administration
- Office of the Deputy Chief for Operations
- BJMP Directorial Staff
- Office of the Secretary to the Command Group

There are also Directorates within the bureau. They are as follows:

- Directorate for Personnel and Records Management
- Directorate for Human Resource Development
- Directorate for Operations
- Directorate for Welfare and Development
- Directorate for Logistics
- Directorate for Comptrollership
- Directorate for Program and Development
- Directorate for Information and Communications Technology Management
- Directorate for Intelligence
- Directorate for Investigation and Prosecution
- Directorate for Health Services

The bureau also has what it calls Support Services. They are as follows:

- Finance Service Office
- Chaplaincy Service Office
- Community Relations Service Office
- Accounting Office
- Legal Service Office
- Headquarters Support Service Office
- Supply Accountable Office-BJMP Wide
- Office of the National Executive Senior Jail Officer
- Legislative Liaison Office
- National Jail Management and Penology Training Institute
- Preventing and Countering Violent Extremism Center
- Retirement and Separation Benefits Administration Service Office
- Jail Service Intelligence Operations Center
- Internal Audit Unit
- Center for Jail Excellence and Strategy Management

== Special Tactics and Response Team ==
The BJMP has the Special Tactics and Response Team (STAR), which specialized in responding to incident that require tactical response, as well as transporting high value Person Deprived of Liberty (PDL).

== Rank structure ==
The ranks of commissioned officers are as follows:

- Director
- Chief Superintendent
- Senior Superintendent
- Superintendent
- Chief Inspector
- Senior Inspector
- Inspector

The ranks of non-commissioned officers are as follows:

- Senior Jail Officer 4
- Senior Jail Officer 3
- Senior Jail Officer 2
- Senior Jail Officer 1
- Jail Officer 3
- Jail Officer 2
- Jail Officer 1

== Non-Uniformed Personnel ==
The bureau employs a host of civilian personnel and employees having no rank. Civil service employees carry their civil service grade.

== List of BJMP Chiefs ==
The following list are incomplete:

Name	Term	Note
As the Head of Jail Management and Penology of PC-INP
BGen. Arsenio E. Concepcion	? – 1990	
As the Chief, BJMP
BGen. Arsenio E. Concepcion	1990 – July 1, 1991	OIC
DIR Charles S. Mondejar	July 1, 1991 – October 31, 1995	Considered as the first officially appointed Chief
SSUPT Basilio G. Cael	October 31, 1995 – January 2, 1996	
CSUPT Silas V. Laurio	January 2, 1996 – July 13, 1997	
SSUPT Josue G. Engano	July 14, 1997 – Jun 30, 1998	
Aquilino G. Jacob Jr.	July 8, 1998 – March 30, 2001	A police officer, with the rank of Police Director (or a P/Major General)
CSUPT Arturo W. Alit, CESO IV	March 30, 2001 – December 14, 2003	As OIC
CSUPT Arturo W. Alit, CESO IV	December 14, 2003 – May 9, 2006	As officially appointed
CSUPT Antonio Cabil Cruz	May 9, 2006 – December 5, 2006	As OIC
CSUPT Clarito Guirhem Jover, Ph.D. (CESO V)	December 18, 2006 – February 20, 2007	As OIC
DIR Armando M. Llamasares, DPA	February 21, 2007 – March 5, 2008	
DIR Rosendo Moro Dial, CESO III	March 5, 2008 – 2012	
DIR Diony S. Mamaril	2012 – Nov 30, 2014	As OIC
DIR Diony S. Mamaril	November 30, 2014 – August 24, 2016	As officially appointed
DIR Cerafin P. Baretto Jr.	August 24, 2016 – September 11, 2017	
DIR Deogracias S. Tapayan	September 11, 2017 – 2018	As OIC
DIR Deogracias S. Tapayan	2018 – March 27, 2019	As officially appointed
DIR Allan S. Iral	March 27, 2019 – June 27, 2019	As OIC
DIR Allan S. Iral	June 27, 2019 – March 22, 2023	As officially appointed
DIR Ruel Rivera	March 22, 2023 – June 26, 2023	As OIC
DIR Ruel Rivera	June 26, 2023 – present	As officially appointed
