= Integrated National Police =

Defunct police force in the Philippines

Philippine Constabulary - Integrated National Police Pinagsamang Pulisyáng Pambansà Policía Nacional Conjunta
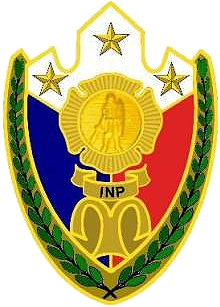
- Insignia and uniform patch
- Abbreviation: INP

Agency overview
- Formed: January 8, 1975; 51 years ago
- Dissolved: January 29, 1991; 35 years ago
- Superseding agency: Philippine National Police

Jurisdictional structure
- National agency: Philippines
- Operations jurisdiction: Philippines

Operational structure
- Headquarters: Camp Crame, Quezon City
- Parent agency: Philippine Constabulary

Facilities
- Commands: 12 Regional Commands

Notables
- Anniversary: August 8

The Integrated National Police (INP) (Filipino: Pinagsamang Pulisyáng Pambansà, PPP; Spanish: Policía Nacional Conjunta, PNC) was the municipal police force for the cities and large towns of the Republic of the Philippines. One of two national police forces in the country along with the Philippine Constabulary, it merged with the latter in 1991 to form the present Philippine National Police.

== Development ==
Until the mid-1970s, independent civic and municipal police forces maintained peace and order on a local level, and when necessary were reinforced by the Philippine Constabulary, the national gendarmerie which was a major branch of the Armed Forces of the Philippines. The National Police Commission (NAPOLCOM) was established in 1966 to improve the professionalism and training of local police, and exercised some supervisory authority.

During martial law in the Philippines under President Ferdinand Marcos, Sr, several presidential decrees amalgamated the police, fire, and jail services of 1,500 cities and municipalities into a unified, national police and civil defense formation, the Integrated National Police (INP), beginning in 1974. On August 8, 1975, Presidential Decree 765 officially established the joint command structure of the Philippine Constabulary and Integrated National Police. The arrangement became known as the Philippine Constabulary-Integrated National Police (PC-INP), and the INP also became an element of the Armed Forces since it was then under supervision of the Constabulary. The commanding general of the Constabulary was also concurrently the Director General of the INP, responsible to the Minister of National Defense and to the President.

Three years afterward, the Philippine National Police Academy was established to train police officers.

== Criticism ==
The Integrated National Police was the subject of criticism, as officers were accused of involvement in illegal activities, violent acts and abuse, with corruption being a frequent charge. To save their public image, the government sponsored highly publicised programs to identify and punish police offenders, and training designed to raise their standard of appearance, conduct, and performance.

== Organization ==
The INP, as a paramilitary national police force and due to its joint command with the PC, used the rank system of the Armed Forces at that time in keeping with the provisions of Presidential Decree No. 1184 (the Integrated National Police Personnel Professionalization Law of 1977). As an organization under the PC, the Commanding General PC, since 1975, was also Director General of the INP, and its 13 regional commanders serving as regional chiefs of police responsible for the 73 Provincial INP Commands, which in turn, were responsible for the operations of the police districts, city and municipal police stations, substations and precincts under their control. In Metro Manila, the Philippine Constabulary Metropolitan Command (MetroCom) was concurrently chief of the Metropolitan (Manila) Police Force, under which the capital's 4 police districts were under his supervision, which in turn were organized into the city and town police stations and subordinate units. Fire and jail protection units were under the overall control of the national headquarters through regional commands.

== Ranks ==
The Integrated National Police adopted a paramilitary-styled ranking classification based on Presidential Decree No. 1184 (the Integrated National Police Personnel Professionalization Law of 1977) issued by then-President Ferdinand Marcos as part of the joint command it shared with the PC, which began in 1975.

=== Police ===
Police Rank
Police Brigadier General
Police Colonel
Police Lieutenant Colonel
Police Major
Police Captain
Police Lieutenant
Police Sergeant
Police Corporal
Patrolman First Class / Patrolwoman First Class
Patrolman / Patrolwoman

Commonly, a Police Brigadier General was a chief of a police district. Even though that is the highest ranking, there some personnel promoted exceeding to the hierarchy rank stated in the law, such as Alfredo Lim being promoted to Police Major General, due to the fact that time, Chief, PC/DG-INP are rose to the rank of Lieutenant General.

=== Office of Fire Protection ===
Fire Rank
Fire Brigadier General
Fire Colonel
Fire Lieutenant Colonel
Fire Major
Fire Captain
Fire Lieutenant
Fire Sergeant
Fire Corporal
Fireman First Class / Firewoman First Class
Fireman / Firewoman

In the Office of the Fire Service (a branch of INP), its national chief was a Fire Brigadier General starting 1990s.

== List of Directors General ==
The following Directors General, INP were concurrently the Chief of the Philippine Constabulary.

Name	Term	Ref.
Lt. Gen. Fidel V. Ramos	January 8, 1975 – 1986	
Lt. Gen. Renato de Villa	1986 – January 26, 1988	
Maj. Gen. Ramon Montaño	January 26, 1988 – 1990	
Maj. Gen. Cesar P. Nazareno	1990 – March 1991	

== Merger ==
On New Year's Day 1991, the INP was subsumed into the PC to form the Philippine National Police (PNP), which took over most former INP functions including the fire and penal services. The PNP assumed responsibility for counterinsurgency efforts from the Armed Forces of the Philippines in 1993.

== See also ==
- Philippine Constabulary
- Philippine National Police
