= Bureau of Fire Protection =

Government body in the Philippines

- Kawanihan ng Pamatay-Sunog; Kawanihan ng Proteksiyon sa Sunog
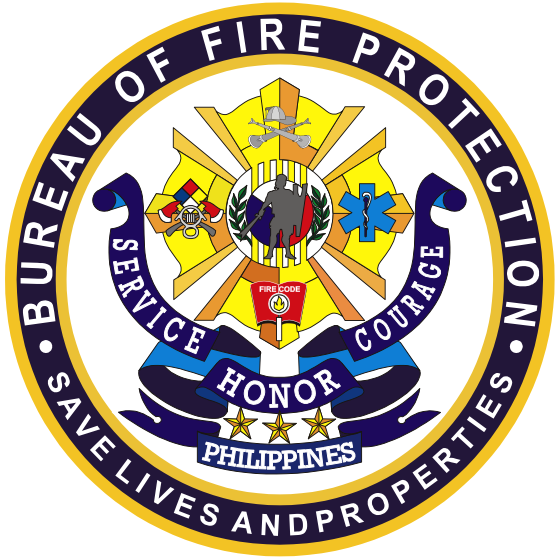

Operational area
- Country: Philippines

Agency overview
- Established: January 29, 1991; 35 years ago
- Employees: 34,474 (2024)
- Annual budget: ₱27.11 billion (2023)
- Fire chief: CSUPT Wilberto Rico Neil A. Kwan Tiu (OIC)
- Motto: "Save Lives and Properties"

Facilities and equipment
- Stations: 51 (cities), 597 (municipalities) (2018)
- Trucks: 2,683 (2018)

Website
- http://bfp.gov.ph/

The Bureau of Fire Protection (BFP; Filipino: Kawanihan ng Pamatay-Sunog or Kawanihan ng Proteksiyon sa Sunog) is the government body in the Philippines responsible for firefighting services. It is under the jurisdiction of the Department of the Interior and Local Government.

== Functions and duties ==
The BFP is responsible for ensuring public safety through the prevention or suppression of all destructive fires on buildings, houses, and other similar structure, forests, and land transportation vehicles and equipment, ships/vessels docked at piers, wharves or anchored at major seaports, petroleum industry installations. It is also responsible for the enforcement of the Fire code of the Philippines and other related laws, conduct investigations involving fire incidents and causes thereof including the filing of appropriate complaints/cases.

According to its website, the primary functions of the BFP are

- Be responsible for the prevention and suppression of all destructive fires on:
  - Buildings, houses, and other structures;
  - Forests;
  - Land transportation vehicles and equipments;
  - Ships and vessels docked at piers or wharves anchored in major sea ports;
  - Petroleum industry installations;
  - Plane crashes; and
  - Other similar activities
- Be responsible for the enforcement of the Fire code and other related laws;
- Shall have the power to investigate all causes of fires and if necessary, file the proper complaint with the city or provincial prosecutor who has jurisdiction over the case;
- In the time of national emergency, all elements of the BFP shall upon direction of the President, assist the AFP in meeting the national emergency; and
- Shall establish at least one (1) fire station with adequate personnel, firefighting facilities, and equipments in every provincial capital, city and municipality subject to standard rules and regulations as maybe promulgated by the Department of the Interior and Local Government (DILG) (Sec 56).

== History ==
Bureau of Fire Protection National headquarters along Senator Miriam P. Defensor-Santiago Avenue (formerly Agham Road) in Quezon City

The BFP was formed from the units of the Integrated National Police's Office of Fire Protection Service on January 29, 1991 through Republic Act No. 6975, which created the present Interior Department and placed the provision of fire services under its control.

Republic Act No. 6975, or the Department of Interior and Local Government Act of 1990, took effect on January 1, 1991 and paved the way for the establishment of the Philippine National Police, BFP and Bureau of Jail Management and Penology as separate entities. Specifically, the Fire Bureau's charter was created under Chapter IV (Section 53 to 59) and carried-out through the provisions of Rule VII (Sections 49 to 58) of the Implementing Rules and Regulations of the act. The organization was then placed under the direct supervision of the DILG undersecretary for peace and order. The Appropriation Act of 1991 also caused the inaugural operation of the BFP on August 2, 1991 as a distinct agency of the government, with the initial preparation of its operation plans and budget (OPB) undertaken by the staff of the Office of the National Chief Fire Marshal at Camp Crame, Quezon City headed by F/Brigadier General Ernesto Madriaga, INP (1990–1992), which took over from the long reign of F/Major Primo D. Cordeta (Ret.), the first chief fire marshal (1978–1989). Madriaga served as the BFP's first acting fire chief/director from 1991 to 1992.

The fire ranks used until 1991:

Fire Brigadier General
Fire Colonel
Fire Lieutenant Colonel
Fire Major
Fire Captain
Fire Lieutenant
Fire Sergeant
Fire Corporal
Fireman First Class
Fireman

In 2021, Republic Act No.11589, or the BFP Modernization Act, was enacted into law, mandating the implementation of a ten-year program to modernize the BFP. The law also enabled the creation of security and protection units (SPUs) in each regional and city fire station and allowed 14 members at most per SPU to bear firearms.

== Organizational structure ==
The bureau is headed by a chief, and is assisted by a deputy chief. It has regional offices, headed by a person with the rank of chief superintendent or senior superintendent. It also has provincial offices, district offices, and city or municipal stations.

Aside from fire fighting units, the bureau has a Special Rescue/HAZMAT unit, an Emergency Medical Services unit, a Special Operations Unit, an Arson Investigation Unit, the Fire Law Enforcement Service, and the Fire National Training Institute.

The current leadership is as follows:

- Commander-in-Chief: Pres. Bongbong Marcos
- Secretary of the Interior and Local Government (SILG): Hon. Juanito Victor C. Remulla
  - Undersecretary for Public Safety, DILG: Usec. Jed Patrick E. Mabilog
- Chief, Bureau of Fire Protection (C, BFP): FCSupt. Wilberto Rico Neil A. Kwan Tiu (OIC)
- The Deputy Chief for Administration (TDCA, BFP): FCSupt. Wilberto Rico Neil A. Kwan Tiu (concurrent capacity as BFP OIC)
- The Deputy Chief for Operations (TDCO, BFP): FCSupt. Fred L. Trajeras Jr.
- The Chief of Directorial Staff (TDCS, BFP): FCSupt. Andrew A. Mendova

The National Headquarters is composed of:

- Office of the Chief, BFP
- Office of the Deputy Chief for Administration
- Office of the Deputy Chief for Operations
- BFP Directorial Staff
  - Directorate for Intelligence and Investigation
  - Directorate for Operations
  - Directorate for Plans and Standard Development
  - Directorate for Comptrollership
  - Directorate for Fire Safety Enforcement
  - Directorate for Logistics
  - Directorate for Personnel and Records Management
  - Directorate for Information and Communications Management
  - Directorate for Human Resource Development

Rank Structure

The ranks of commissioned officers are as follows:

- Director
- Chief Superintendent
- Senior Superintendent
- Superintendent
- Chief Inspector
- Senior Inspector
- Inspector

The ranks of non-commissioned officers are as follows:

- Senior Fire Officer 4
- Senior Fire Officer 3
- Senior Fire Officer 2
- Senior Fire Officer 1
- Fire Officer 3
- Fire Officer 2
- Fire Officer 1

Non-Uniformed Personnel

The bureau employs a host civilian personnel and employees having no rank. Civil service employees carry their civil service grade.

== Equipment ==
The bureau provides fire fighting vehicles depending on the jurisdiction's capabilities. Each city and municipality in the Philippines has one to four such vehicles in their inventories at a minimum.

Photos	Model	Origin	Type	Note
	Isuzu Forward	Japan	Medium Fire engine	New Euro 4 variant was procured under Duterte Administration.
	Isuzu Giga	Japan	Heavy Fire engine	New Euro 4 variant was procured under Duterte Administration.
	MAN TGM 18.250 Rosenbauer TLF 4000	Austria	Heavy Fire engine	Procured under the Aquino Administration. used in Highly-Urbanized Cities
	Pierce Dash 100	United States	Aerial Fire engine	Acquired under Quezon City Government
Hino Ranger	Hino Ranger	Japan	Medium Fire engine	Acquired under Cebu City Government
	1982 Ford Roughneck F800	United States	Medium Fire engine	Procured during 1980's under the Marcos Administration. used in municipalities.
	Hyundai HD120	South Korea	Medium Fire engine	
	Dongfeng Hubei 4x2	China	Medium Fire engine	Procured under the Aquino Administration. used in municipalities
	Isuzu NDR	Japan	Light Fire engine	

== List of BFP Chiefs ==
The following is an incomplete list.

Name	Term	Note
As the Chief National Fire Marshal of INP Office of Fire Protection
F/Maj. Primo D. Cordeta	1978 – 1989	
F/BGen. Ernesto G. Madriaga	1990 – 1991	
As the Chief, Bureau of Fire Protection
F/BGen Ernesto G. Madriaga	1991 – 1992	OIC
F/Maj. Gen. Mario Tanhanco	1992 – 1993	
F/BGen. Alfonso Torres Clemente	1993 – 1994	
SSUPT Bonifacio Japson Garcia	1994	
SSUPT Edgar Gayotin Gimotea	1994	
SSUPT Felipe Tarroza Carpio	1994 – 1995	
SSUPT Bonifacio Japson Garcia	1995 – 1997	
SSUPT Gil Paz Jacinto	1997	
SSUPT Donato Bernal Gonzales	1997	A medical doctor
SSUPT Rolando Martir Jacomille	1997	
DIR Rogelio Naval Tumabaga	1997 – 1998	
Raymundo E. Padua	1998 – 2000	In also as the DILG Assistant Secretary, a Police Superintendent (now P/Lt. Col.)
CSUPT Francisco Shimotzu Senot	2000 – 2004	
DIR Rogelio Francisco Asignado	2004 – 2006	
DIR Jose Elisan Collado	2006 – 2007	
DIR Enrique Cumbe Lisangan	2007 – 2008	
DIR Rolando Maaño Bandilla	2008 – 2011	
CSUPT Samuel Rivera Perez	2011 – 2012	OIC
CSUPT Ruben Fornaleza Bearis, Jr.	2012 – 2013	Appointed as OIC first
CSUPT Carlito Saqueton Romero	January 11, 2013 – November 4, 2014	
DIR Ariel Aguilar Barayuga	2014 – 2016	
CSUPT Rodrigo Reyes Abrazaldo	2016	
DIR Bobby Vargas Baruelo	2016 – 2017	
DIR Leonard Bañago	July 11, 2017 – September 29, 2017	OIC
DIR Leonard Bañago	September 29, 2017 – January 7, 2020	
DIR Jose Embang Jr.	January 7, 2020 – September 7, 2021	
DIR Louie Puracan	September 6, 2021 – October 12, 2021	OIC
DIR Louie Puracan	October 12, 2021 – November 28, 2024	
DIR Jesus P. Fernandez	November 28, 2024 – April 10, 2025	OIC / caretaker
DIR Jesus P. Fernandez	April 11, 2025 – March 17, 2026	
CSUPT Wilberto Rico Neil A. Kwan Tiu	March 17, 2026 –	OIC / caretaker

== See also ==
- Philippine National Police
- Bureau of Jail Management and Penology
