= Philippine Public Safety College =

Public college in Quezon City, Philippines

- Type: State College
- Established: October 7, 1993
- Chairman: Jonvic Remulla
- President: Ferdinando G. Sevilla
- Vice-president: Froilan P. Elorpe (VP-Administration); Vert T. Chavez (VP-Academics)
- Location: Tandang Sora Ave., cor. Mactan St., Old Balara, Quezon City, Philippines; 14°36′40.47″N 121°03′16.36″E
- Website: ppsc.gov.ph
- Location in Metro Manila Location in Luzon Location in the Philippines

The Philippine Public Safety College (PPSC; Filipino: Kolehiyo ng Pilipinas para sa Kaligtasang Pampubliko) is a public educational institution in the Philippines.

The Philippine Public Safety College System is the umbrella organization that comprises the National Police College (NPC), National Police Training Institute (NPTI) with its 18 Regional Training Centers (RTCs), National Fire Training Institute (NFTI), National Jail Management and Penology Training Institute (NJMPTI), and the National Forensic Science Training Institute (NFSTI).

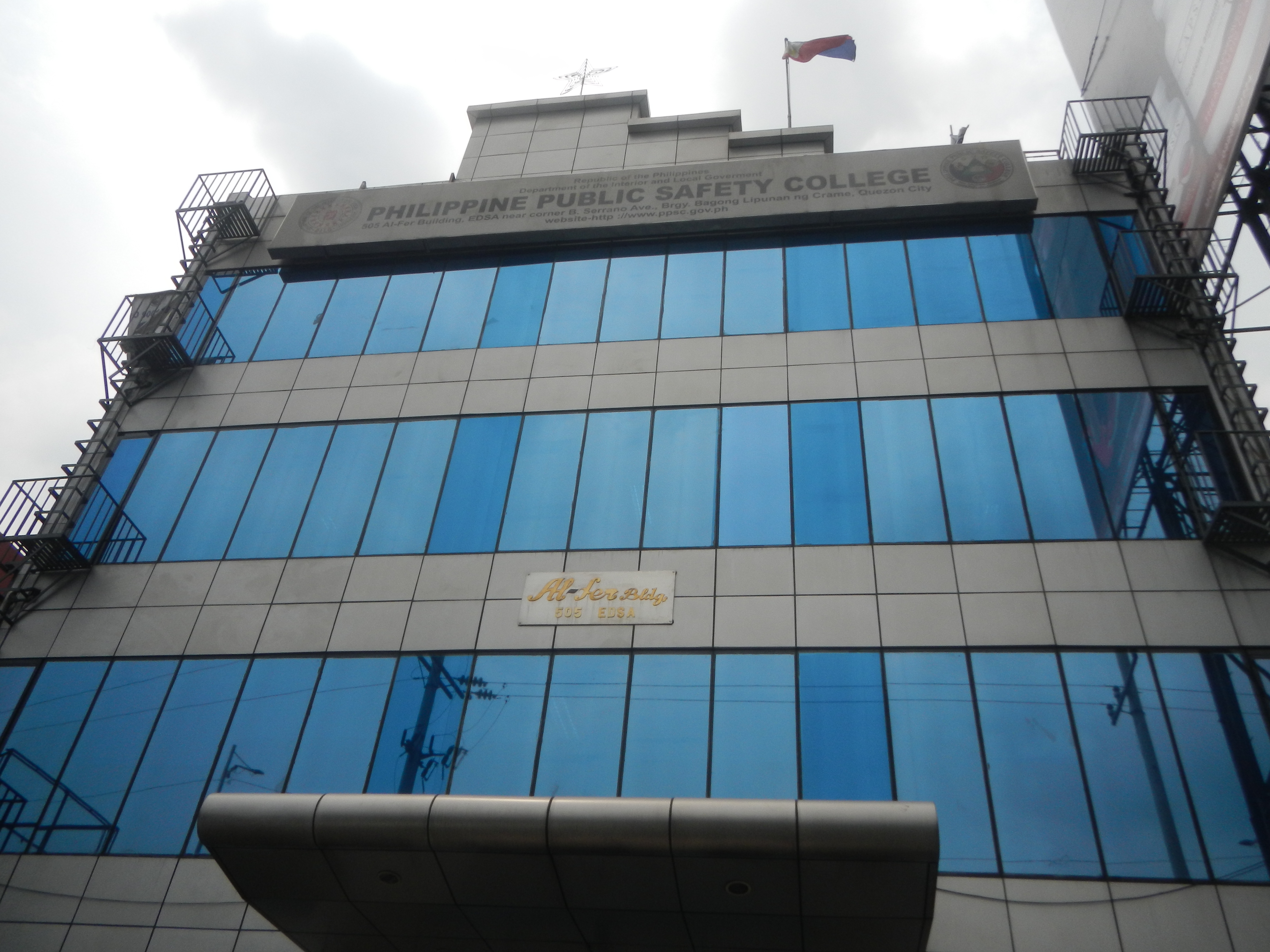
Former PPSC building in Cubao, Quezon City
