= List of air display teams =

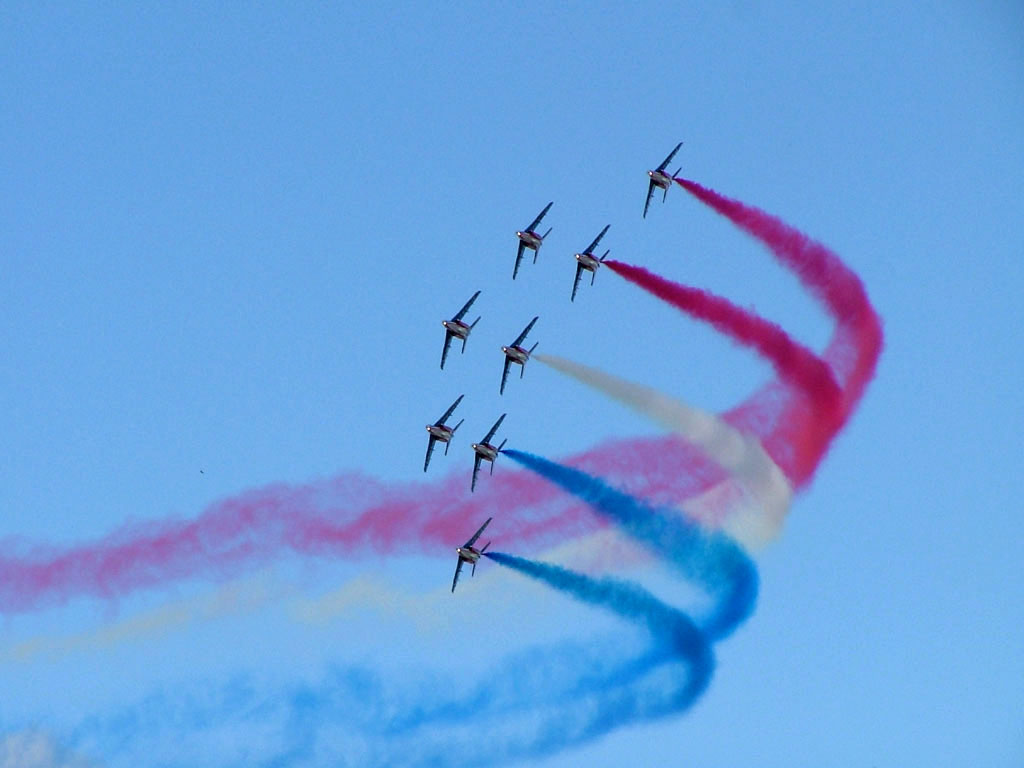
The Patrouille de France trailing coloured smoke.

Many air forces from around the world, along with some navy and army aviators, and even a few private organisations, have established air display teams to perform at domestic and international air shows, major sporting occasions, and even corporate events. Some display teams perform aerobatics, while others give displays of formation flying or their professional operations such as air-sea rescue.

== Air display teams ==
=== Active ===
Active air display teams, military and civilian
Display team	Country	Operator	Current aircraft	When formed	Notes, references
AeroSuperBatics	United Kingdom	Civilian	Boeing–Stearman Model 75	1982	The world's only formation wingwalking team
Al Fursan	United Arab Emirates	United Arab Emirates Air Force	Hongdu L-15	2010	
Alap-Alap Formation	Brunei Darussalam	Royal Brunei Air Force	Pilatus PC-7 Mk.II	2011	
August 1st	China	People's Liberation Army Air Force	Chengdu J-10	1962	
Baltic Bees	Latvia	Civilian	Aero L-39 Albatros	2008	
Belaya Rus	Belarus	Belarusian Air Force	Aero L-39 Albatros	2006	
Black Eagles	South Korea	Republic of Korea Air Force	KAI T-50B Golden Eagle	1953	
Black Falcons	New Zealand	Royal New Zealand Air Force	Beechcraft T-6 Texan II	2000	
Black Knights	Singapore	Republic of Singapore Air Force	General Dynamics F-16C Fighting Falcon	1973	
Blue Angels	United States	United States Navy	Boeing F/A-18E/F Super Hornet	1946	
Blue Impulse	Japan	Japan Air Self-Defense Force	Kawasaki T-4	1960	
Blue Phoenix	Thailand	Royal Thai Air Force	Pilatus PC-9	2012	
Blue Voltige	Italy	Civilian	Fournier RF 5	2000	
Breitling Jet Team	France	Breitling, private	Aero L-39 Albatros	2003	
CF-18 Demonstration Team	Canada	Royal Canadian Air Force	McDonnell Douglas CF-18 Hornet		
Chinook Display Team	United Kingdom	Royal Air Force	Boeing Chinook	2004	
Flying Bulls Aerobatics Team	Czech Republic	Civilian	XtremeAir Sbach 342	1999	
Flying dragons team	Poland	Civilian	Dudek Snake 1.2	2014	
Frecce Tricolori	Italy	Italian Air Force	Alenia Aermacchi M-346	1961	
F-16 Viper Demo	United States	United States Air Force	General Dynamics F-16 Fighting Falcon	2018	
Halcones	Chile	Chilean Air Force	Game Composites GB1 GameBird	1981	
IAF Aerobatic Team	Israel	Israeli Air Force	Beechcraft T-6 Texan II	1973	
Iron Wolf Aerobatics	Lithuania	Civilian	Sbach Xtremeair XA42 and Sukhoi SU26M	2022	
Jupiter Aerobatic Team	Indonesia	Indonesian Air Force	KAI KT-1B	2008	
Wings of Storm	Croatia	Croatian Air Force	Pilatus PC-9M	2005	
Kris Sakti	Malaysia	Royal Malaysian Air Force	Extra 300L	2011	
Marche Verte	Morocco	Royal Moroccan Air Force	Mudry CAP-232	1988	
Midnight Hawks	Finland	Finnish Air Force	BAE Hawk Mk.51	1997	
Orlik Aerobatic Team	Poland	Polish Air Force	PZL-130 Orlik	1998	
P3 Flyers	Switzerland	Civilian	Pilatus PC-3	1996	
Patriots Jet Team	United States	Civilian	Aero L-39 Albatros	2003	
Patrouille de France	France	French Air Force	Dassault/Dornier Alpha Jet	1931	
Patrouille Suisse	Switzerland	Swiss Air Force	Northrop F-5E Tiger II	1964	
Patrulla Águila	Spain	Spanish Air and Space Force	CASA C-101 Aviojet	1985	
Patrulla Aspa	Spain	Spanish Air and Space Force	Eurocopter EC120B Colibri	2003	
PC-7 Team	Switzerland	Swiss Air Force	Pilatus PC-7	1987	
Red Arrows	United Kingdom	Royal Air Force	BAE Hawk T1A	1965	Used the Folland Gnat until 1980
Red Falcon	China	PLA Air Force Aviation University	Hongdu JL-8	2011	
Rotores de Portugal	Portugal	Portuguese Air Force	AgustaWestland AW119 Koala	1976	
Roulettes	Australia	Royal Australian Air Force	Pilatus PC-21	1970	
Royal Jordanian Falcons	Jordan	Royal Jordanian Air Force	Extra EA-330LX	1976	
Russian Falcons	Russia	Russian Air Force	MIG-29	2006	
Russian Knights	Russia	Russian Air Force	Sukhoi Su-30SM	1991	
Sarang	India	Indian Air Force	HAL Dhruv	2003	
Saudi Falcons	Saudi Arabia	Royal Saudi Air Force	BAE Hawk T1A	1998	Will use Hawk T2s from 2026
Sherdils	Pakistan	Pakistan Air Force	Karakorum K-8P	1972	
Silver Falcons	South Africa	South African Air Force	Pilatus PC-7 Mk.II	1946	
Silver Stars Aerobatic Team	Egypt	Egyptian Air Force	Karakorum K-8E	1974	
Silver Swallows	Republic of Ireland	Irish Air Corps	Pilatus PC-9	1986; 2022	
Sky Wing	China	PLA Air Force Aviation University	Nanchang CJ-6	2011	
SkyAces	Australia	Civilian	Wolf Pitts Pro		
Smoke Squadron	Brazil	Brazilian Air Force	Embraer EMB 314 Super Tucano	1952	
Snowbirds	Canada	Royal Canadian Air Force	Canadair CT-114 Tutor	1971	
SoloTürk	Turkey	Turkish Air Force	General Dynamics F-16 Fighting Falcon	2011	Solo team
Southern Cross Aerobatic Squadron	Argentina	Argentine Air Force	FMA IA-63 Pampa	1962	
Surya Kiran	India	Indian Air Force	BAE Hawk Mk.132	1996	
Swifts	Russia	Russian Air Force	Mikoyan MiG-29UB	1991	
Team Raven	United Kingdom	Civilian	Van's Aircraft RV-8	2010	
The Hawks of Romania	Romania	Aeroclubul Romaniei	Extra 330SC, Extra 300L	2007	One of the largest Extra 300/330 formations in the world.
The Horsemen Aerobatic Team	United States	Civilian	various	1994	
Thunder aerobatics team	China	People's Liberation Army Ground Force	CAIC Z-10	2013	
Titan Aerobatic Team	United States	Civilian	North American T-6 Texan	1984	Formerly the AeroShell Aerobatic Team.
Thunder Tigers Squadron	Taiwan	Republic of China Air Force	AIDC AT-3B	1953	
Thunderbirds	United States	United States Air Force	General Dynamics F-16C/D Fighting Falcon	1953	
Turkish Stars	Turkey	Turkish Air Force	Canadair NF-5A/B Freedom Fighter	1992	
WeFly! Team	Italy	Civilian	Fly Synthesis Texan	2007	Pilots with physical disabilities
White Arrows (JMSDF)	Japan	Japan Maritime Self-Defense Force	Fuji T-5	1998	Former Blanc Aile
Wildcat Demo Team	United Kingdom	Royal Navy - Fleet Air Arm	Agusta Westland Wildcat HMA.2	2001	Previously the Black Cats
Yakitalia	Italy	Civilian	Yakovlev Yak-50 and Yakovlev Yak-52	1999	One of the longest-serving civilian aerobatic teams in Italy
Zeus	Greece	Hellenic Air Force	General Dynamics F-16 Fighting Falcon	2010	Solo team
Display team	Country	Operator	Current aircraft	When formed	Notes, references

=== Formation flying ===
Team	Country	Operator	Current aircraft	When formed	Notes
The Victors	Belgium	Civilian	Piper PA-28 Cherokee series	2004	

=== Defunct ===
==== Aerobatics ====
Defunct former air display teams, military and civilian
Display team	Country	Operator	Final aircraft	When formed	Disbanded	Notes, references
Acro Deltas	Sweden	Swedish Air Force	Saab Draken	1963	1966	
Alpi Eagles	Italy	Civilian	SIAI-Marchetti SF.260	1981	1990	
Asas de Portugal	Portugal	Portuguese Air Force	Dassault/Dornier Alpha Jet	1977	2010	
Black Arrows	United Kingdom	Royal Air Force - 111 Squadron	Hawker Hunter F.4 & F.6	1956	1960	
Blades	United Kingdom	Royal Air Force	BAC Jet Provost T.5	1970	1972	Successor to The Gins
Blue Chips	United Kingdom	Royal Air Force	DHC Chipmunk T.10	1960s	1974	
Blue Devils	Canada	Royal Canadian Air Force	De Havilland Vampire	1949	1951	
Blue Diamonds	United Kingdom	Royal Air Force - 92 Squadron	Hawker Hunter	1960	1962	
Blue Diamonds	Philippines	Philippine Air Force	Northrop F-5	1952	2005	
Bulldogs	United Kingdom	Royal Air Force	Bulldog T.1			
Canadian Harvard Aerobatic Team	Canada	Civilian	North American Harvard	1999	2021	
Cavallino Rampante (Prancing Horses)	Italy	Italian Air Force - 4th Wing	North American F-86 Sabre	1950	1961	Served three tours as the national air display team (1950-52, 1956-57 and 1960-61)
Coors Light Silver Bullet - Airshow Team	United States	Civilian	BD-5J	1983	1991	
Diavoli Rossi (Red Devils)	Italy	Italian Air Force - 6th Wing	Republic F-84F Thunderstreak	1958	1959	Served one tour as the national air display team (1958-59)
Dragões	Portugal	Portuguese Air Force	F-84 Thunderjet	1950s	1958	
Elang Biru (Blue Falcon)	Indonesia	Indonesian Air Force	F-16 Fighting Falcon	1995	2000	
Fighting Cocks	United Kingdom	Royal Air Force	Hawker Hunter F.4	1950s	1950s	
Firebirds	United Kingdom	Royal Air Force - 56 Squadron	Lightning F.1	1963	1965	
Falcons	Pakistan	Pakistan Air Force	North American F-86 Sabre	1958		
Gazelles	United Kingdom	Royal Air Force	Gazelle HT.3	1970s	1970s	
Gemini Pair	United Kingdom	Royal Air Force	Jet Provost T.4 & T.5	1970	1973	
Getti Tonanti (Thunderjets)	Italy	Italian Air Force - 5th Wing	Republic F-84 Thunderjet	1953	1960	Served two tours as the national air display team (1953-55 and 1959-60)
The Gins	United Kingdom	Royal Air Force	Jet Provost T.4	1968	1970	
The Blades	United Kingdom	2Excel Aviation (civilian)	Extra EA-300	2005	2023	
Golden Centennaires	Canada	Royal Canadian Air Force	Canadair CT-114 Tutor	1967	1967	
Golden Crown	Iran	Imperial Iranian Air Force	F-5E Tiger II	1955	1979	
Golden Hawks	Canada	Royal Canadian Air Force	Canadair F-86 Sabre	1959	1964	
Golden Sabres	Philippines	Philippine Air Force	F-86F Sabre	1972	1974	
Goldilocks	Canada	Royal Canadian Air Force	North American Harvard Mk.4	1962	1964	
Green Marrows	United Kingdom	Royal Air Force	Canberra B.2 & T.4	1989	1989	
Kiwi Red	New Zealand	Royal New Zealand Air Force	A-4K Skyhawk	1986	1989	
LancieriNeri (Black Lancers)	Italy	Italian Air Force - 2nd Wing	Canadair Sabre	1957	1959	Served one tour as the national air display team (1957-59)
Leteće zvezde	Yugoslavia	Yugoslav Air Force	Soko G-4 Super Galeb	1985	2000	
Linco Flying Aces	United States	Civilian				
Lincolnshire Poachers	United Kingdom	Royal Air Force	Jet Provost	1969	1969	
Linton Blacks	United Kingdom	Royal Air Force	Vampire T.1	1960	1960	
Macaws	United Kingdom	Royal Air Force	Jet Provost T.4	1968	1972	
Meteorites	United Kingdom	Royal Air Force	Meteor T.7	1952	1952	
Paybills	Pakistan	Pakistan Air Force	Supermarine Attacker	1952		
Poachers	United Kingdom	Royal Air Force	Jet Provost T.4 & T.5	1963	1976	
Rattlers	Pakistan	Pakistan Air Force	Shenyang F-6	1969	14 March 1969	
Red Aces	Philippines	Philippine Air Force		1971	1974	
Red Checkers	New Zealand	Royal New Zealand Air Force	CT-4 Airtrainer	1967; 1980	1973; 2015	
Red Dragons	Pakistan	Pakistan Air Force	Hawker Sea Fury	1951		
Red Pelicans	United Kingdom	Royal Air Force - Central Flying School	Jet Provost T.4 & T.5	1962	1973	
Redskins	United Kingdom	Royal Air Force	Jet Provost	1959	1959	
Sabres Nine	Pakistan	Pakistan Air Force	North American F-86 Sabre	1964		
Sharks	United Kingdom	Royal Navy - Fleet Air Arm	Gazelle	1975	1992	
Sagar Pawan	India	Indian Navy	HAL Kiran 2	2003	2010	
Skylarks	United Kingdom	Royal Air Force	Chipmunk T.10	1968	1970	
Skytypers	United States	Civilian	North American T-6 Texan		2022	
Swallows	Belgium	Belgian Air Force	SIAI-Marchetti SF.260	1973	1997	
Swords	United Kingdom	Royal Air Force	Jet Provost T.5	1974	1974	
Silver Swallows	Republic of Ireland	Irish Air Corps	CM.170 Magister	1986	1998	
Solo Display Team	Netherlands	Royal Netherlands Air Force	F-16 Fighting Falcon & AH-64 Apache	1979	2019	solo team of each aircraft
Team Iskry	Poland	Polish Air Force	PZL TS-11 Iskra	1969	2021	
Team 60	Sweden	Swedish Air Force	Saab 105 (SK 60)	1974	2024	Retirement of SK60
Tigers	Pakistan	Pakistan Air Force	Shenyang F-6	1980		
Tigers	United Kingdom	Royal Air Force - 74 Squadron	Lightning F.1; Phantom F-4J	1961	1992	
Tigri Bianche (White Tigers)	Italy	Italian Air Force - 51st Wing	Republic F-84 Thunderjet	1953	1956	Served one tours as the national air display team (1955-56)
Tomahawks	United Kingdom	Royal Air Force	Sioux HT.3	1967	1969	
Ukrainian Falcons	Ukraine	Ukrainian Air Force	Mikoyan MiG-29	1995	2002	
Vipers	United Kingdom	Royal Air Force	Jet Provost T.4	1968	1969	
Yellowjacks	United Kingdom	Royal Air Force - 4 Flying Training School	Folland Gnat T.1	1964	1964	became the Red Arrows
Display team	Country	Operator	Final aircraft	When formed	Disbanded	Notes, references

==== Formation flying ====
Team	Country	Operator	Final aircraft	When formed	Disbanded	Notes
Four Horsemen	United States	774th Troop Carrier Squadron	Lockheed C-130A Hercules	1957	1960	
