= Golden Sabres =

Golden Sabres Philippine Air Force Aerobatic Team
- Active: 1971 – 74
- Country: Philippines
- Branch: Philippine Air Force
- Role: Aerobatic flight display team
- Size: varies per season
- Base: Basa Air Base, Floridablanca, Pampanga, Philippines

The Golden Sabres of the 9th Tactical fighter squadron were one of the Philippine Air Force's aerial demonstration teams.

== History ==
Early in 1971, by virtue of the verbal orders of then Brig. Gen. Rancudo, two teams were formed to perform in the Aviation Week celebration, the "Blue Diamonds" and "Red Aces". That same year also saw the emergence of still another aerobatic team, the Golden Sabres of the 9th Tactical Fighter Squadron led by then Maj. Antonio Bautista. The Golden Sabres made its debut in early 1972 in Iba, Zambales. The celebration of Aviation Week brought the Golden Sabres to the south. Fresh and young as it was, it had the distinction of being the first aerobatic team to perform before audiences in Visayas and Mindanao like Iloilo, Mactan, Bacolod, Davao, Zamboanga and Cagayan de Oro.

== Merging with the Red Aces ==
In 1973, the Golden Sabres found itself short of pilots and crew because of the crisis in the south. At the same time the Red Aces primary use of the F-86 Sabre has been changed to the F-8H Crusader. The two teams merge into one with the call sign "SABRES".

== Sabres ==
The Sabres Aerobatic Team is the most unusual in the air force in the sense that it is a combination of two aerobatic teams, the Red Aces of the 7TFS and the Golden Sabres of the 9TFS. The "Sabres" team lasted just a few years, until a petrol crisis forced its disbandment.
