= Jose Balajadia Jr. =

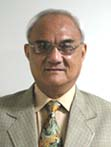

Sergeant-at-Arms of the Senate of the Philippines
- In office April 2002 – June 30, 2019
- Preceded by: Leonardo Lopez
- Succeeded by: Edgardo Rene Samonte

Personal details
- Born: November 23, 1943 Ilocos, Philippine Commonwealth
- Died: July 7, 2019 (aged 75) Baguio, Philippines
- Children: 5
- Occupation: Military officer, pilot
- Military career
- Allegiance: Philippines
- Branch: Philippine Air Force
- Service years: 1960s–1999
- Rank: Major general
- Unit: Blue Diamonds

Jose V. Balajadia Jr. (November 23, 1943 – July 7, 2019) was a Filipino military officer and pilot who later became the longest-serving sergeant-at-arms of the Senate of the Philippines from 2002 to 2019 after his retirement from military duty in 1999.

== Early life ==
Jose Balajadia Jr. was born on November 23, 1943 in Ilocos.

== Career ==
=== Military career ===
Balajadia served 38 years and active officer and pilot of the Philippine Air Force. He served as the leader of the Blue Diamonds in 1977 as a lieutenant colonel. He retired in 1999 with the rank of major general.

=== Senate seargeant-at-arms ===
Balajadia was appointed as sergeant-at-arms of the Senate of the Philippines in 2002. He is tasked to maintain order within the Senate floor.

He was noted for his opening statement of "please all rise" during the impeachment trial of Chief Justice Renato Corona in 2011.

Balajadia escorted Senators Leila de Lima and Antonio Trillanes during their respective arrests in 2017 and 2018. The cases of the two senators were later dismissed.

He resigned from his position on June 30, 2019. He is the longest serving Senate sergeant-of-arms.

== Personal life ==
Balajadia had five children with his wife.

== Illness and death ==
Balajadia was diagnosed with bone cancer sometime in 2018 and with prostate cancer in early 2019. A week prior to his death, he learned that his heart has enlarged and caught pneumonia. Balajadia died on July 7, 2019 due to heart failure while confined at the Baguio General Hospital in hometown of Baguio.
