= Red Aces (aerobatic team) =

Red Aces Philippine Air Force Aerobatic Team
- Red Aces insignia
- Active: 1971 – present
- Country: Philippines
- Branch: Philippine Air Force
- Type: Aermacchi S-211
- Role: Aerobatic flight display team
- Size: varies per season
- Base: Basa Air Base, Floridablanca, Pampanga, Philippines

Gaining the same praises like the "Blue Diamonds" the Philippine Air Force "Red Aces" were the 7th Tactical Squadrons Aerial Demonstration Team.

== History ==
Early in 1971, by the orders of then Brig. Gen. Jose L. Rancudo, wing commander of the 5th Fighter Wing, two teams were formed to perform in the aviation week celebration. The two teams were to be formed and manned by the respective squadrons namely the 6th Tactical Fighter Squadron (Cobras) and 7th Tactical Fighter Squadron (Bulldogs). Thus the "Blue Diamonds" became 6TFS aerobatic team and the "Red Aces" became the 7TFS aerobatic team. After its successful performance in the Aviation week at the Manila International Airport it drew raves from thousands of Boy Scouts and the people of Pangasinan during the Boy Scout Jamboree held there. The squadron used to have then F-86 Sabre jets as their main asset. With the use of the F-8H Crusader as primary aircraft, the Red Aces temporarily disbanded in 1974. When the S-211 jets came around, the team was reorganized in 1996. Today, the team is very much in demand in performing to the public. On several occasions it became the regular main attraction of the International Hot Air Balloon Festival at Clark Air Base, Pampanga.

== Merging with the Golden Sabres ==
With the use of the Vought F-8 Crusader as primary aircraft and the retirement of the North American F-86 Sabre, the Red Aces temporarily ceased to exist in the 1974. The team was merged with the "Golden Sabres" team into the "Sabres" aerobatic team. The "Red Aces" were later re-established in 1996, this time flying with five Aermacchi S-211.

== Maneuvers ==
- The calypso
- Shackle turn
- Upward bomb burst
- Opposing knife edge
- Whifferdil
- Loop
- Dirty pass
- Barrel roll
- Corkscrew
- Downward bomb burst
