= Silver Stars Aerobatic Team =

Egyptian aerobatic demonstration team

Silver Stars
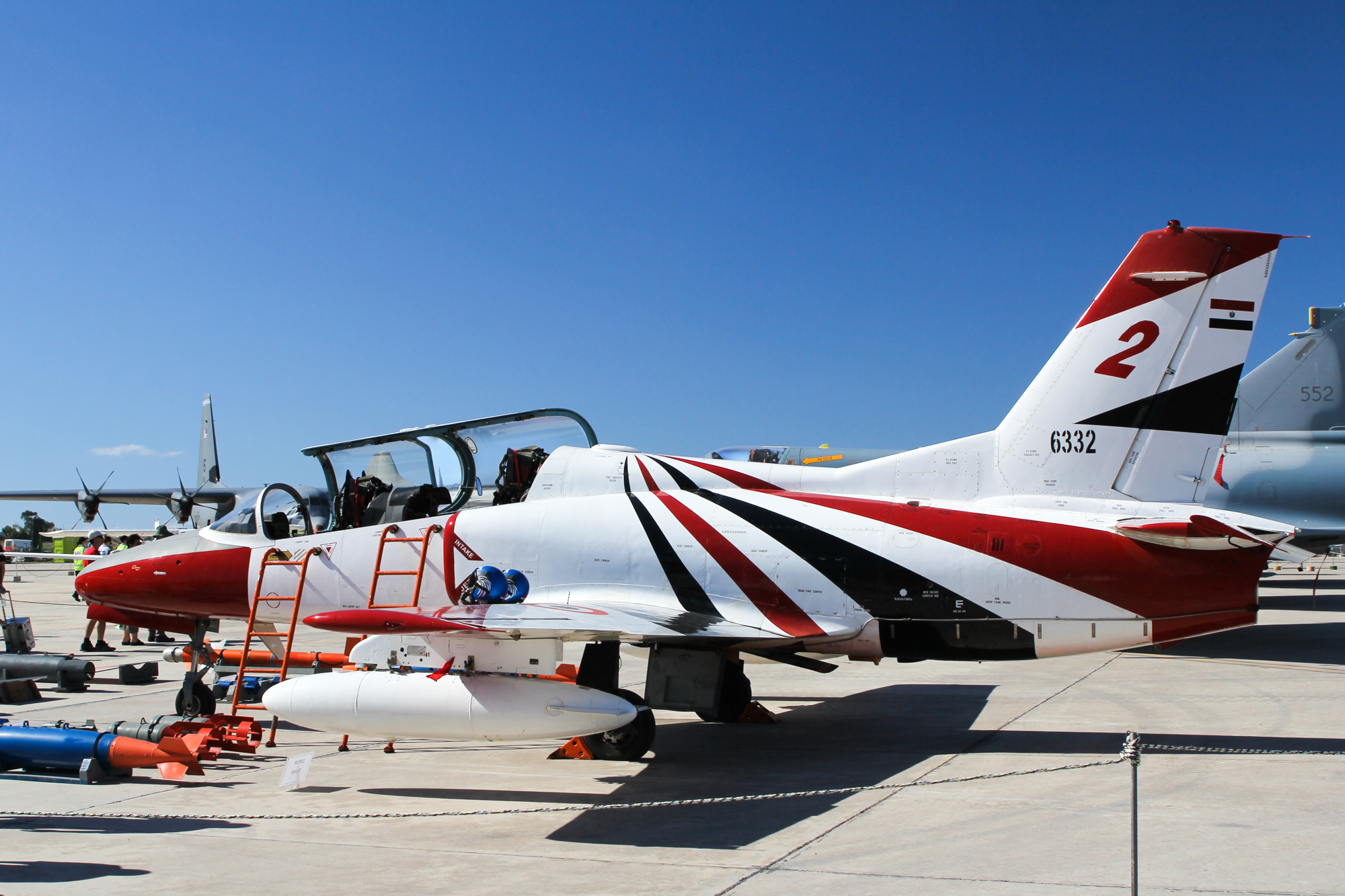
- Silver Stars K-8 aircraft
- Active: 1974-present
- Country: Egypt
- Branch: Egyptian Air Force
- Role: Aerobatic display
- Colors: Black; White; Red

Aircraft flown
- Trainer: 10x K-8 Karakorum

Silver Stars is the Egyptian Air Force aerobatic display team flying 10 K-8E Karakorum jet trainer aircraft painted in white, red and black colors. All planes are equipped with red, white and black smoke generators. During the shows, the Silver Stars performs eight different formations along with several single aircraft passes. All pilots are flying instructors at the Egyptian Air force Academy based in Bilbays Air Base.

The Egyptian Air Force demonstration team "The Silver Stars" was formed in mid 1974 to participate in the "October War" anniversary. The team first flew four L-29 planes painted in dark green and brown and yellow color scheme. The display team frequently conducts displays over Cairo and Giza. They often fly with the Saudi Falcons,the Red Arrows and the South Korean Black Eagles.

== Aircraft ==
Aircraft Flown
Aircraft name	Number of units	Years
Aero L-29 Delfín	4	1974–1984
Dassault/Dornier Alpha Jet	6	1984–2003
K-8E Karakorum	6	2003–2010
K-8E Karakorum	10	2010–present

== See also ==
- Surya Kiran
- Sherdils
