= Philippine Air Force =

Air warfare branch of the Armed Forces of the Philippines

- Hukbong Himpapawid ng Pilipinas
- Seal of the Philippine Air Force
- Founded: July 1, 1947; 79 years ago
- Country: Philippines
- Type: Air force
- Role: Aerial warfare
- Size: 17,600 active personnel; 16,000 reserve personnel; 227 total aircraft in service with additional 56 on order
- Part of: Armed Forces of the Philippines
- Headquarters: Colonel Jesus Villamor Air Base, Pasay City
- Mottos: "Guardians of our Precious Skies, Bearers of Hope"
- Colors: Air Force Blue
- March: Philippine Air Force Hymn
- Engagements: World War II; Hukbalahap Rebellion; United Nations Operation in the Congo; Communist insurgencies; Moro conflict; New People's Army rebellion; 1986–90 Philippine coup attempts; Spratly Islands Dispute; Operation Enduring Freedom - Philippines; Battle of Marawi
- Website: www.paf.mil.ph

Commanders
- Commander-in-Chief: President Bongbong Marcos
- Secretary of National Defense: Gilberto Teodoro Jr.
- Chief of Staff of the Armed Forces of the Philippines: GEN Antonio G. Nafarrette, PA
- Commanding General of the Air Force: Lieutenant General Arthur M. Cordura, PAF
- Vice Commander, Philippine Air Force: Major General Pablo E. Rustria, Jr. (acting)
- Chief of Air Staff: Major General Ulysses S. Marquez
- Sergeant Major of the Air Force: CMSgt John I. Roxas, PAF

Insignia
- Roundel

Aircraft flown
- Attack: A-29B, AS-211, SF-260TP/MP
- Fighter: FA-50PH
- Helicopter: Bell 412EP, UH-1H/D, W-3A, S-70A-5/i, S-76A/AUH-76, Bell 205
- Attack helicopter: T129B, AW109E Power, MD520MG
- Patrol: ATR 72MP
- Reconnaissance: Aero Commander, Cessna 208, ScanEagle, Hermes 450, Hermes 900
- Trainer: SF-260FH, T-41B/D
- Transport: Fokker F27, C-130, Aero Commander, Cessna 208, IPTN NC-212, F28, N-22B, C-295M, Hawker 800, Gulfstream G280

The Philippine Air Force (PAF) (Filipino: Hukbong Himpapawid ng Pilipinas, lit. 'Air Army of the Philippines') is the aerial warfare service branch of the Armed Forces of the Philippines. Initially formed as part of the Philippine Army as the Philippine Army Air Corps (PAAC) in 1935, the PAAC eventually saw combat during World War 2 and was formally separated from the Army in 1947 as a separate service branch of the AFP under Executive Order No. 94. At present, the PAF is responsible for both defending Philippine airspace and conducting aerial operations throughout the Philippines, such as close air support operations, combat air patrols, aerial reconnaissance missions, airlift operations, helicopter tactical operations, special operations, and aerial humanitarian operations, which includes search and rescue operations. The PAF has also carried out various missions within the country and abroad.

== History ==
=== Philippine Commonwealth and independence ===
==== Early years and World War II ====
The forerunner of the Philippine Air Force was the Philippine Militia, otherwise known as Philippine National Guard (PNG). On March 17, 1917, Senate President Manuel L. Quezon enacted a bill (Militia Act 2715) for the creation of the Philippine Militia. It was enacted in anticipation of an outbreak of hostilities between United States and Germany.

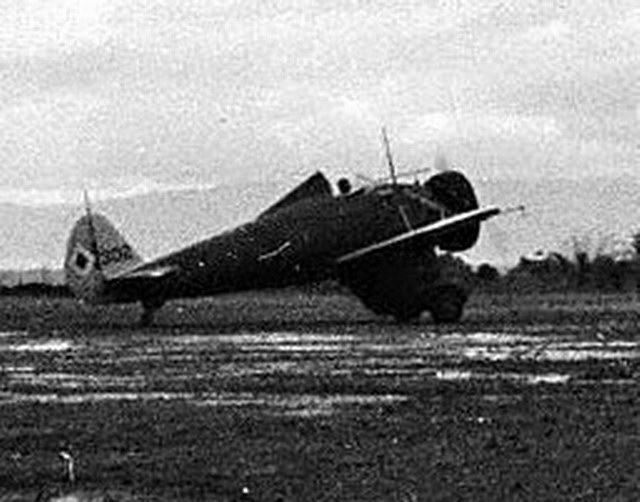
P-26 Peashooter used by the Philippine Air Corps (1941)

By the end of the First World War, the US Army and Navy began selling aircraft and equipment to the Philippine Militia Commission. The Commission then hired the services of the Curtiss Flying School to provide flight training to 33 students at Camp Claudio, Parañaque.

The early aviation unit was, however, still lacking enough knowledge and equipment to be considered as an air force and was then limited only to air transport duties. On January 2, 1935, Philippine Military Aviation was activated when the 10th Congress passed Commonwealth Act 1494 that provided for the organization of the Philippine Constabulary Air Corps (PCAC). PCAC was renamed the Philippine Army Air Corps (PAAC) in 1936. It started with only three planes in its inventory. In 1941, PAAC had a total of 54 aircraft including pursuit (fighters) light bombers, reconnaissance aircraft, light transport and trainers. They later engaged the Japanese when they invaded the Philippines in 1941–42, and were reformed in 1945 after the country's liberation.

==== Post-WWII and AFP restructuring ====
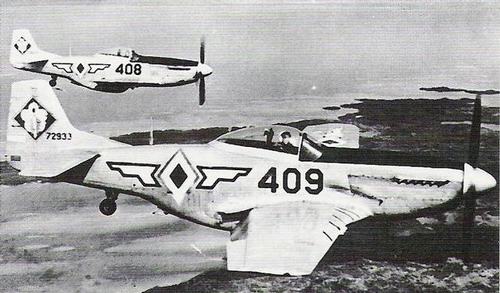
PAF P-51 Mustang

The PAF became a separate military service on July 1, 1947, when President Manuel Roxas issued Executive Order No. 94. This order created the Philippine Naval Patrol and the Air Force as equal branches of the Philippine Army and the Philippine Constabulary under the now Armed Forces of the Philippines becoming Southeast Asia's third air force as a result.

The main aircraft type in the earlier era of the PAF was the P-51 Mustang, flown from 1947 to 1959. Ground attack missions were flown against various insurgent groups, with aircraft hit by ground fire but none shot down. In the 1950s the Mustang was used by the Blue Diamonds aerobatic display team. These would be replaced by the jet-powered North American F-86 Sabres in the late 1950s, assisted by Lockheed T-33 Shooting Star and Beechcraft T-34 Mentor trainers.

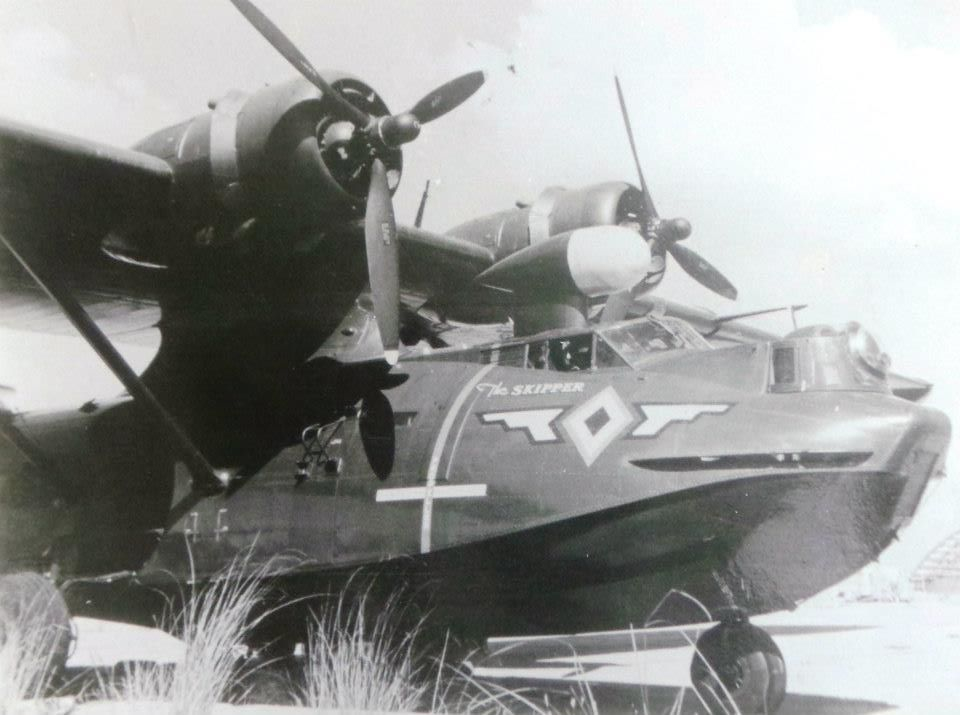
PBY Catalina amphibious aircraft used by the Philippine Air Force after independence

==== 1963 Congo Mission and the Limbas Squadron ====
The United Nations Operation in the Congo would be the first international mission of the Philippine Air Force after President Diosdado Macapagal deployed the 9th Tactical Fighter "Limbas" Squadron to assist the United Nations.

The 9th Tactical Fighter Squadron left for the Congo on 11 February 1963 and conducted flight operations from Kamina Air Base.

=== Cold War era ===
==== Marcos rule and People Power Revolution ====
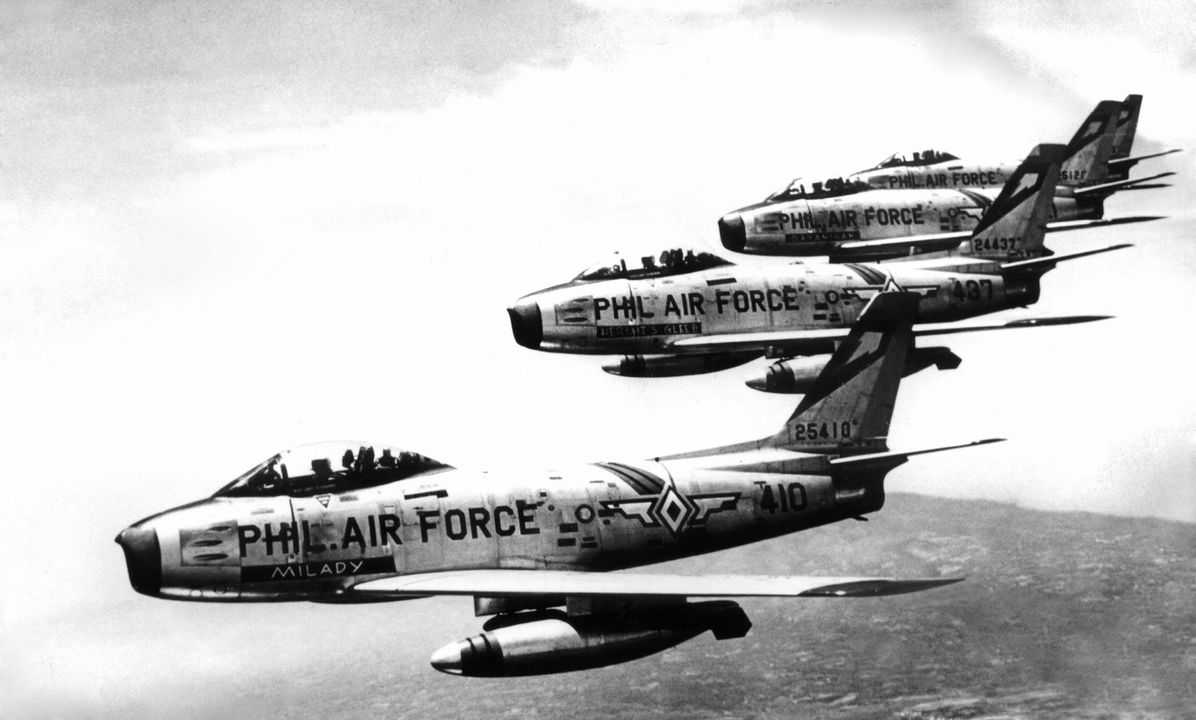
A squadron of F-86F Sabre of the Philippine Air Force

When unrest arising from news of the Jabidah Massacre during Ferdinand Marcos' first presidential term triggered the Moro conflict in Mindanao and the establishment of the Moro National Liberation Front (MNLF) in 1972, the PAF was called upon to actively provide air support for the AFP campaign against MNLF in Central Mindanao, aside from doing the airlifting duties for troop movements from Manila and Cebu to the conflict zone. Traditional workhorses like the UH-1H choppers, L-20 “Beaver” aircraft, and C-47 gunships were mainly used in the campaign.

In the same decade, the PAF Self-Reliance Development Group, the forerunner of the Air Force Research and Development Center (AFRDC) was created. The Center enabled the PAF to create prototypes of aircraft aside on going into partnership with the private sector for some of its requirements.

In late 1977, the Philippine government purchased 35 secondhand U.S. Navy F-8Hs that were stored at Davis-Monthan AFB in Arizona. Twenty-five of them were refurbished by Vought and the remaining 10 were used for spare parts. As part of the deal, the U.S. would train Philippine pilots in using the TF-8A. They were mostly used for intercepting Soviet bombers. The F-8s were grounded in 1988 and were finally withdrawn from service in 1991 after they were badly damaged by the Mount Pinatubo eruption, and have since been offered for sale as scrap.

The PAF played a key part in ending the Marcos dictatorship during the 1986 People Power Revolution through the "Sotelo landing" of February 24, 1986. Forces under Defense Minister Juan Ponce Enrile had planned a coup against Marcos but were discovered early, and, trapped in Camp Aguinaldo, asked the support of Philippine Constabulary Chief Fidel Ramos in nearby Camp Crame. When Roman Catholic Cardinal Jaime Sin learned about the situation, he called upon Philippine civilians, many of whom were preparing to protest the anomalous results of the 1986 Philippine presidential election to form a human barricade around the camps, effectively preventing Marcos' forces from taking the camps in a land assault but leaving the camps vulnerable to attack from the air. After determining that all his men were no longer willing to support Marcos in the aftermath of the election, Col. Antonio Sotelo defected with the entirety of the 15th Strike Wing, Philippine Air Force, landing 6 S-76 gunships, 2 rescue helicopters, and a utility BC-105 on the grounds of Ramos' headquarters at Camp Crame. Sotelo and his forces then later flew back to Villamor Air Base to disable six remaining UH-1 'Huey' helicopters which Marcos' forces could have used to attack the camps. This encouraged even more AFP units to withdraw their support for the dictatorship.

==== 1986–1990 Coup attempts ====
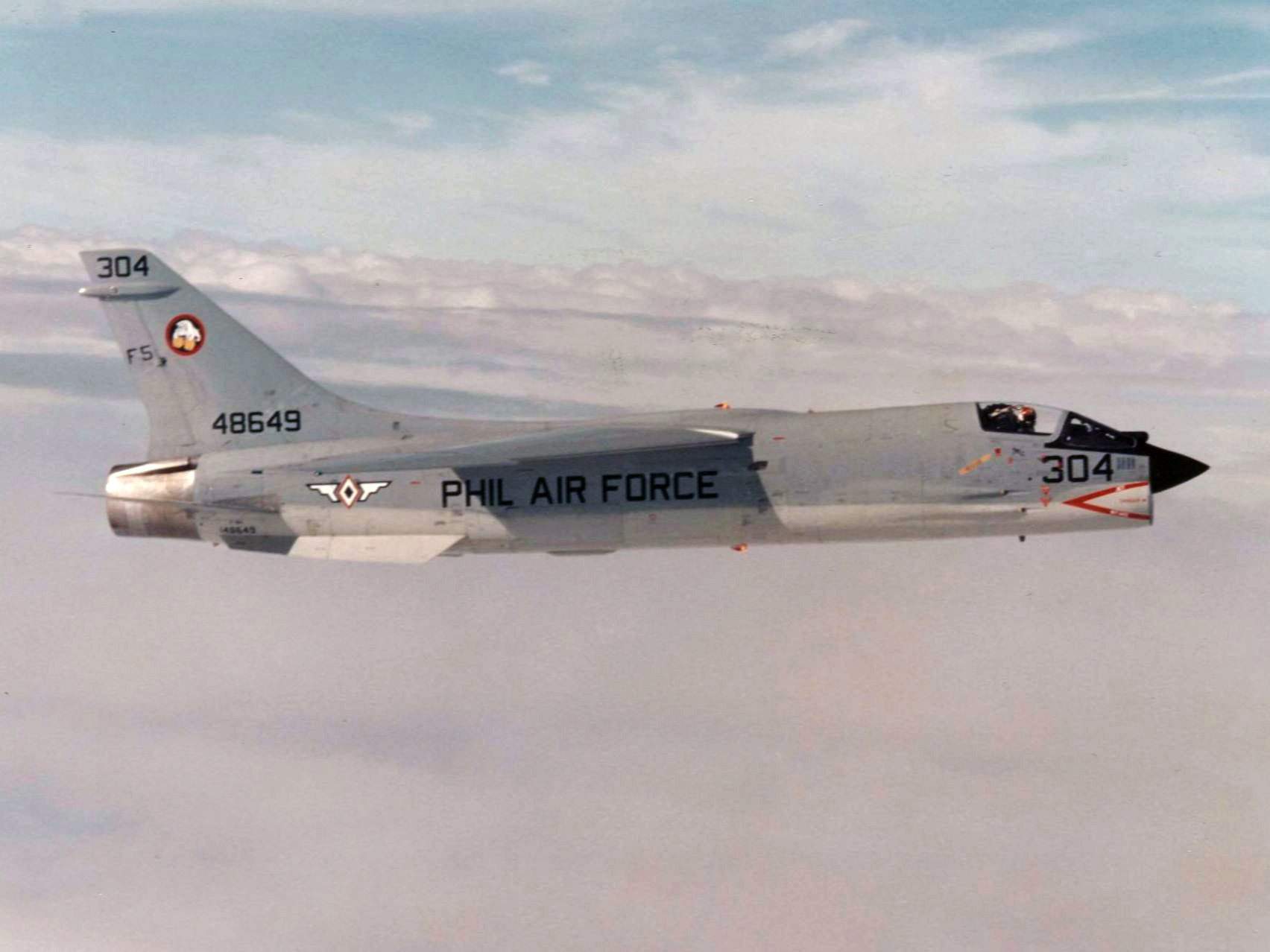
A Vought F-8H Crusader (ex U.S. Navy BuNo 148649) of the Philippine Air Force in flight.

The following years remained hostile for the Philippines, a series of bloody coup attempts led by then Col. Gregorio Honasan of the Reform the Armed Forces Movement, involved thousands of renegade troops, including elite units from the army and marines, in a coordinated series of attacks on Malacanang and several major military camps in Manila and surrounding provinces, including Sangley and Villamor Air Base, using the T-28 aircraft for aerial assaults. President Corazon Aquino found it necessary to request United States support to put down the uprising. As a result, a large US special operations force was formed and named Operation Classic Resolve, as USAF F4 fighter aircraft stationed at Clark Air Base patrolled above rebel air bases, and two aircraft carriers were positioned off the Philippines. The US operation soon caused the coup to collapse. Additional US forces were then sent to secure the American embassy in Manila. The military uprisings resulted in an estimated US$1.5 billion loss to the Philippine economy.

==== US military departure from the Philippines ====
The Cold War Era has reached its endpoint as tensions between the two ideological rivals, the United States and the Soviet Union, have simmered down as a result of the dissolution of the latter and the massive change of political system among its allies.

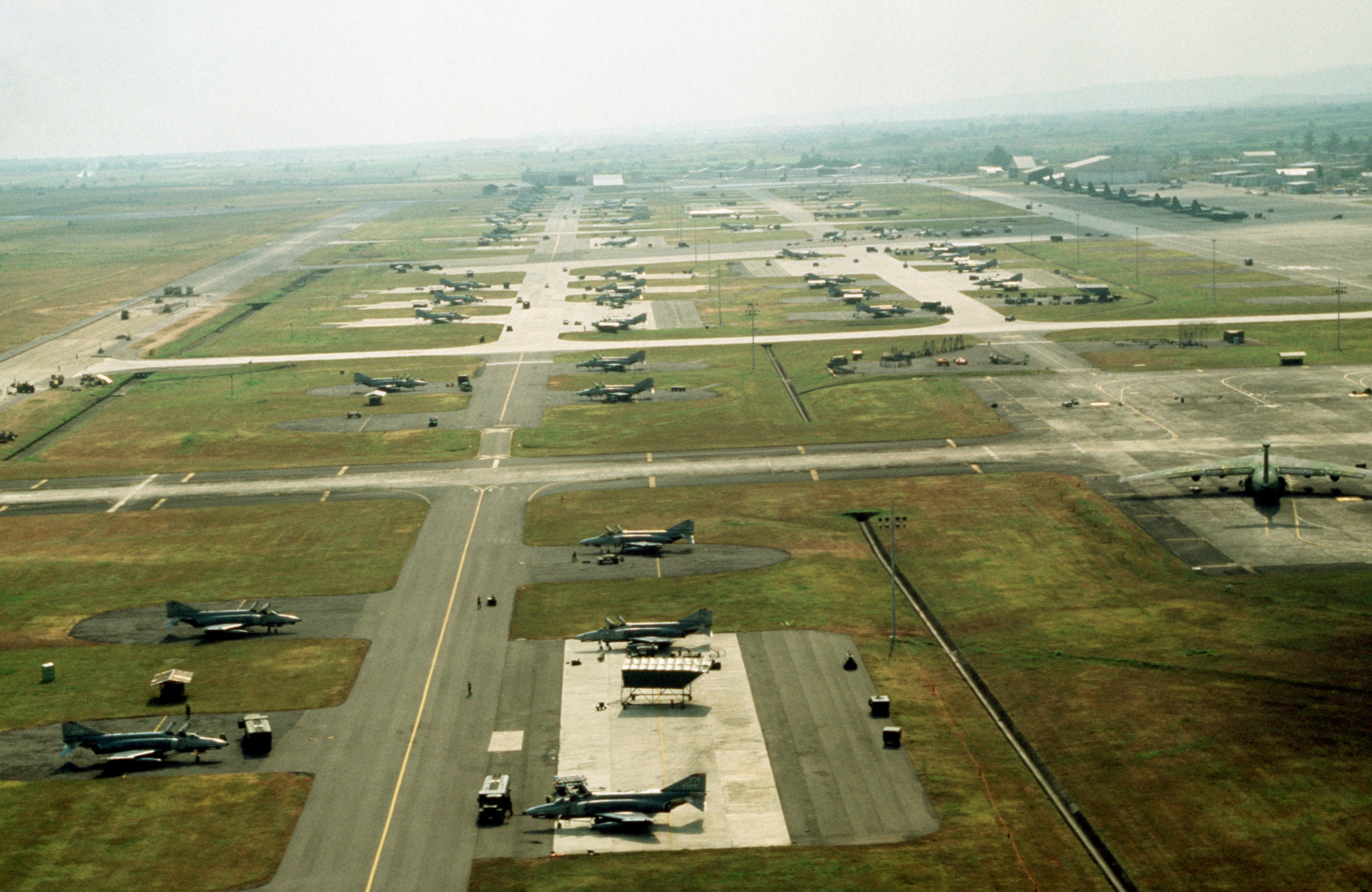
An aerial photo of Clark Airbase in Central Luzon

The fate of the US military bases in the country was greatly affected by these circumstances, and by the catastrophic eruption of Mount Pinatubo in 1991 which engulfed the installations with ash and lahar flows. The nearby Clark Air Base was eventually abandoned afterwards, while the Philippine Senate voted to reject a new treaty for Subic Naval Complex, its sister American installation in Zambales. This occurrence had effectively ended the century-old US military presence in the country, even as President Corazon Aquino tried to extend the lease agreement by calling a national referendum, leaving a security vacuum in the region and terminated the flow of economic and military aid into the Philippines.

=== Contemporary era ===
==== AFP modernization efforts and 1997 Asian financial crisis ====
The importance of territorial defense capability was highlighted in the public eye in 1995 when the AFP published photographs of Chinese structures on Mischief Reef in the Spratlys.

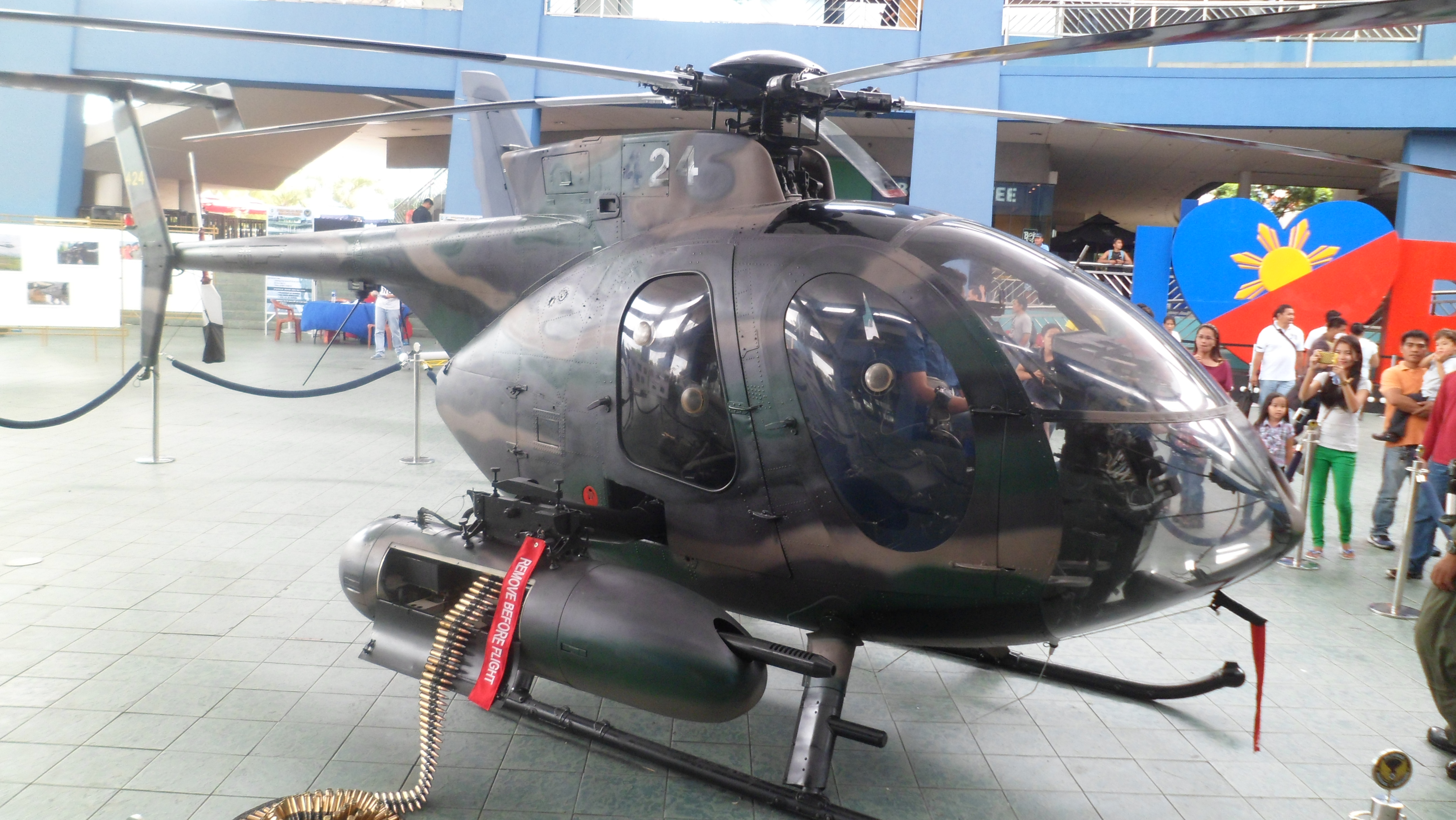
The PAF MD-520MG displayed at the Mall of Asia.

Initial attempts to improve the capabilities of the Armed Forces happened when a law was passed in the same year for the sale of redundant military installations and the devotion of 35 percent of the proceeds for AFP upgrades. Subsequently, the legislature passed the AFP Modernization Act. The law sought to modernize the AFP over a 15-year period, with minimum appropriation of 10-billion Pesos per year for the first five years, subject to increase in subsequent years of the program. The modernization fund was to be separate and distinct from the rest of the AFP budget.

However, the 1997 Asian financial crisis greatly affected the AFP Modernization Program due to the government's austerity measures.

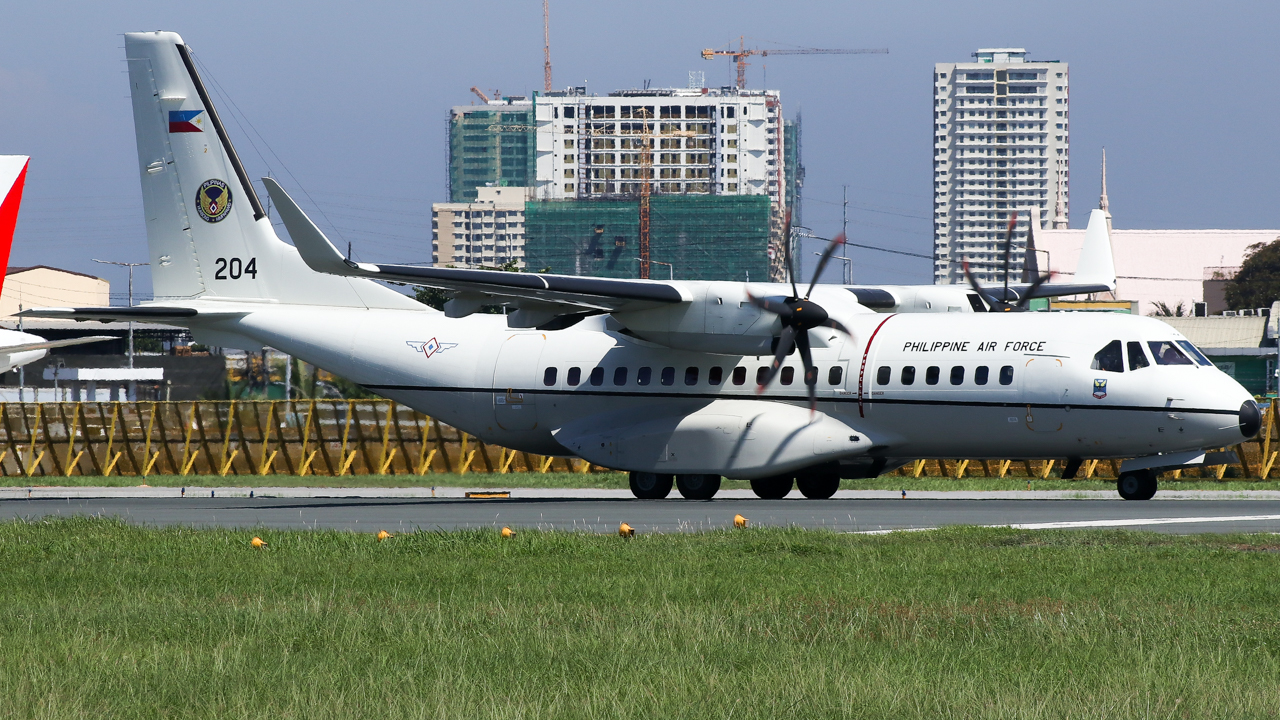
C-295W of the Philippine Air Force assigned to 220th Airlift Wing of the Air Mobility Command

Several air assets acquired by the Philippine Air Force through the original AFP Modernization Program of 1995 were the AW109 armed scout helicopters, and airlift assets like the Airbus C295 and CASA C212 Aviocar.

==== A decade of neglect ====
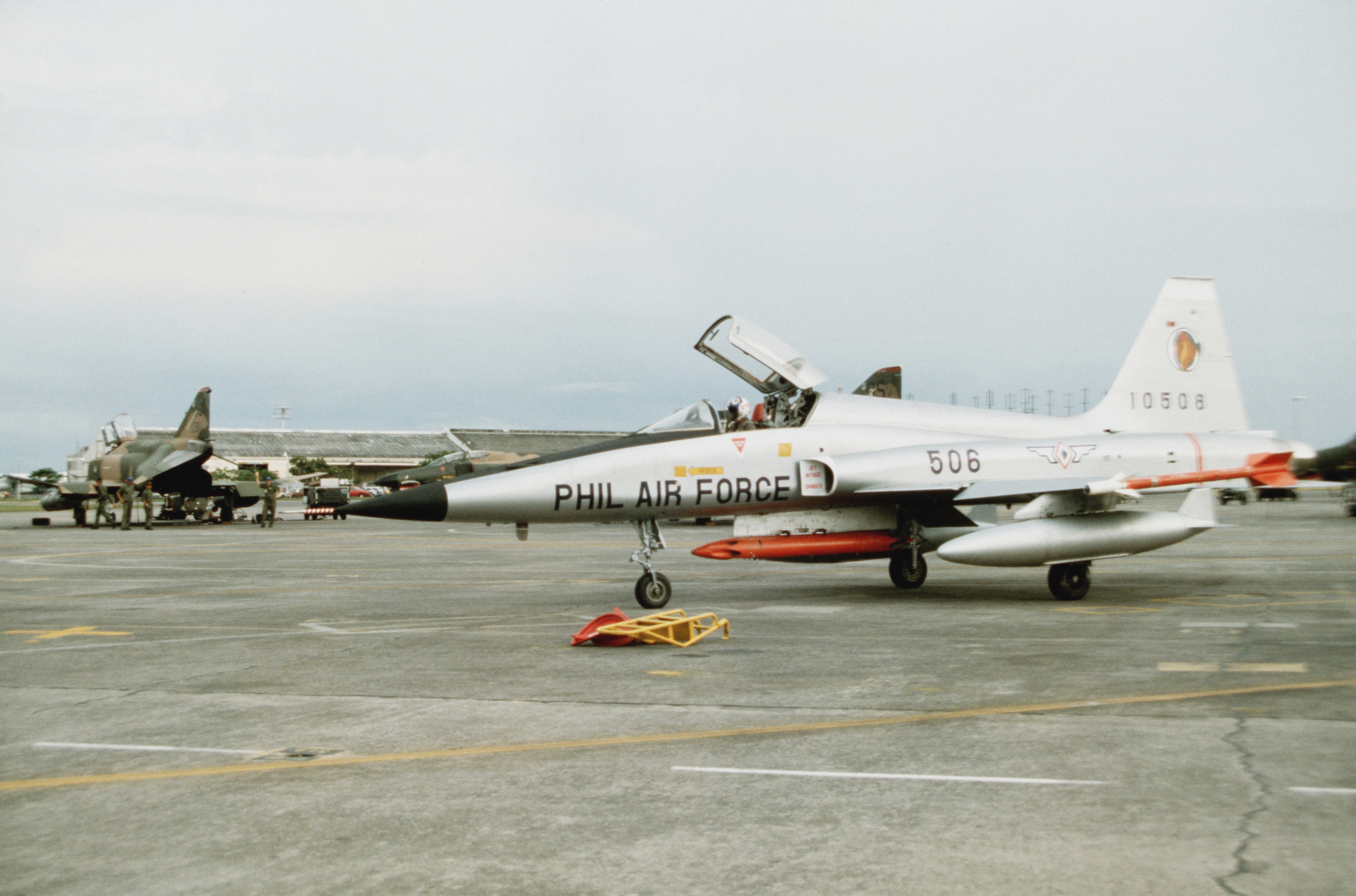
Former F-5A Freedom Fighter of the Philippine Air Force

The AS-211 Warrior jet trainer/light attack aircraft, which served as "gap stopper" for the PAF in its air defense operations

Since the retirement of the Northrop F-5s in September 2005 without a planned replacement, the Philippine Air Force was left without fighter jets. The PAF resorted to the Aermacchi S-211 trainer jets to fill the void left by the F-5's. These S-211's were later upgraded to light attack capability and used for air and sea patrol and also performed counter-insurgency operations from time to time. The only active fixed wing aircraft to fill the roles were the SF-260 trainers with light attack capability, the OV-10 Bronco light attack and reconnaissance aircraft and the AS-211 warriors (upgraded S-211).

==== South China Sea arbitration case and revised AFP Modernization Program ====
The incidents with Chinese presence in the South China Sea prompted the Philippines to proceed with formal measures while challenging the Chinese activities in some of the sea features in the disputed island chain. Hence, the South China Sea Arbitration Case was filed by the Philippines in 2013 at the International Tribunal for the Law of the Sea (ITLOS).

Reminiscent to what occurred in 1995, the Congress passed the Revised AFP Modernization Act of 2012, which was meant to replace the older AFP Modernization Act of 1995 signed during former President Fidel V. Ramos’ term, when its 15-year program effectivity expired in 2010.

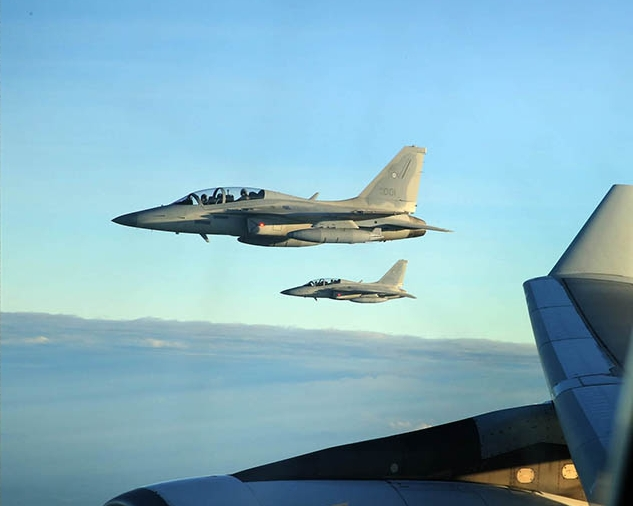
Two FA-50 Golden Eagle light multi-role fighter/LIFTs escorting a Philippine Airlines flight carrying President Benigno S. Aquino III

Major air assets acquired under this new modernization program iteration were 12 FA-50 Light Fighters, while those programmed for future procurements are Multi-Role Fighters and Maritime Patrol Aircraft, among other equipment.

==== Flight Plan 2028 ====
In response to regional strategic challenges and perceived internal weaknesses, the PAF has embarked on a transformation process to enhance its capabilities. Flight Plan 2028 is administered by the Air Force Strategy Management Office (AFSMO), and aims to:

- Build the PAF capability to detect, identify, intercept and neutralize intrusions in the Philippine Air Defense Identification Zone (PADIZ) and the South China Sea (to the North and West of the archipelago) from Area Readiness 4 to Area Readiness 3 by 2022.
- Build the PAF capability to detect, identify, intercept and neutralize intrusions into the entire Philippine territory from Area Readiness 3 to Area Readiness 1 by 2028;

The plan calls for a reorienting of the Philippine Air Force from a primarily internal security role to a territorial defence force. It will require substantial organisational, doctrinal, training, strategic and equipment transformation.

==== US-Philippine Enhanced Defence Cooperation Agreement ====
In April 2014, the Enhanced Defense Cooperation Agreement was signed by the representatives of the Philippine and US Governments, aimed at bolstering the military alliance of both countries. The agreement allows the United States to rotate troops into the Philippines for extended stays and allows the U.S. to build and operate temporary facilities on Philippine military bases for both American and Philippine forces' use.

Both parties agreed to determine the military installations across the Philippines as covered by the pact, including the former US Subic Bay Naval Base and Clark Air Base, as well as several locations in Cebu, Luzon, and Palawan.

As of 2016, four PAF bases and one Army camp have been determined by the United States and the Philippines to be utilized under the agreement. The Air Force Bases are Basa Air Base, Antonio Bautista Air Base, Benito Ebuen Air Base, and Lumbia Airfield (now Godofredo Juliano Air Base).

== Vision ==
A professional and competent Air Force responsive to national security and development.

== Mission ==
To organize, train, equip, maintain and provide forces in order to conduct prompt and sustained air operations to accomplish the AFP mission.

== Organization ==
The Philippine Air Force is administered through the Department of National Defense (DND). Under the AFP structure, the Chief of Staff, Armed Forces of the Philippines (CSAFP), a four-star general/admiral (if the officer is a member of the Philippine Navy), is the most senior military officer, The senior Air Force officer is the Commanding General, Philippine Air Force (CG, PAF), who usually holds the rank of Lieutenant General. He is assisted by the Vice Chief of the Philippine Air Force (VCPAF), and the Chief of Air Staff (CSPAF), in charge of organizational and administrative matters, both holders of the rank of Major General.

The Philippine Air Force consists of three tactical commands, three support commands, seven air wings (including one separate search and rescue wing), one engineer brigade, one air control and warning wing, one air weather group and one special operations unit.

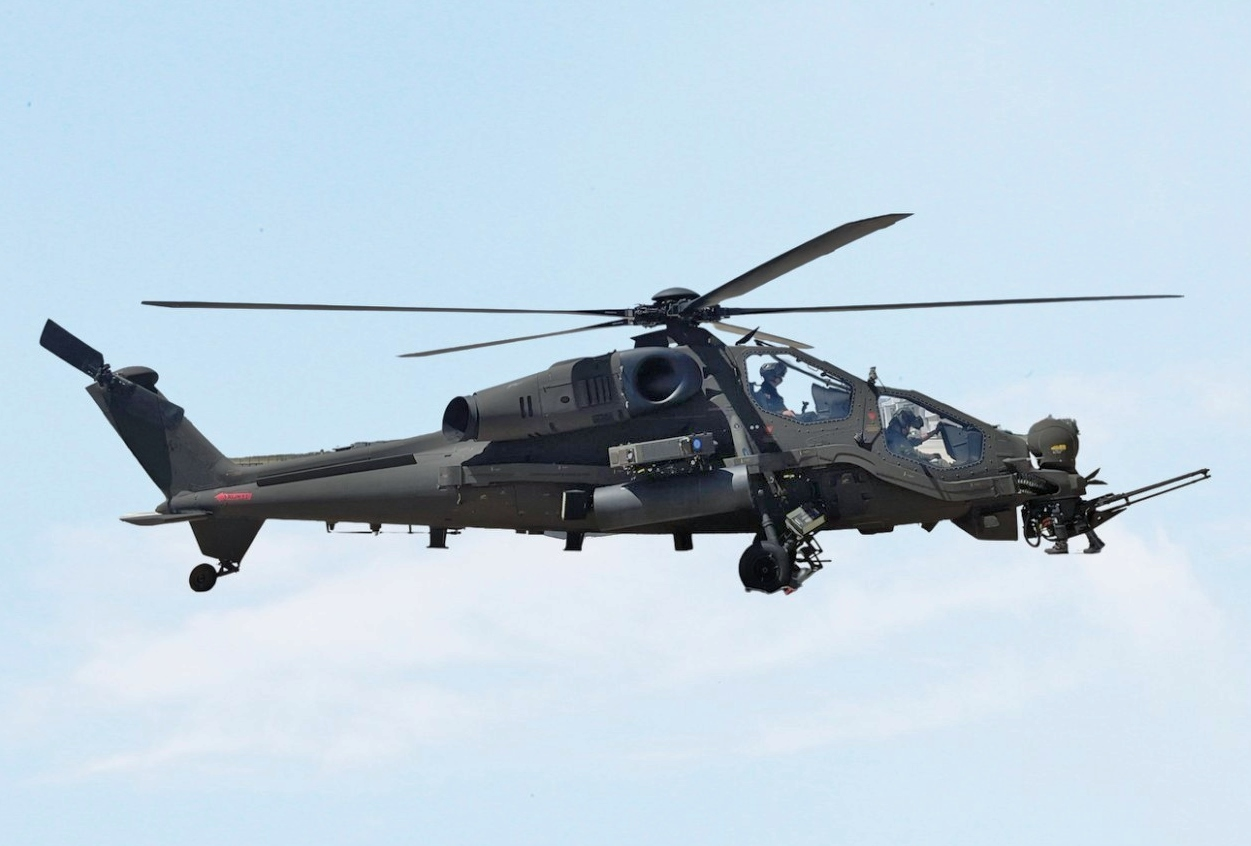
T129B ATAK Helicopter of the Philippine Air Force (PAF)

=== Tactical Commands and Air Wings ===
The three Tactical Commands are in the direct control of the PAF Leadership while serving his function in the command chain of the AFP. These units are jointly reactivated and reorganized on July 21, 2017, while effectively replacing the 1st, 2nd, and 3rd Air Divisions as part of the PAF Flight Plan 2028.

- Air Defense Command (ADC), Clark Air Base - responsible for overall air defense, tracking and interdiction of the PAF and the AFP.

Flying Units

- 5th Fighter Wing, Basa Air Base – it is responsible for fighter operations of the PAF. It replaced the Air Defense Wing after the two were reactivated to their original status in 2017.
  - 6th Tactical Fighter (Cobras) Squadron – reactivated in July 2025, to fly the upcoming KAI FA-50PH Block 70 Fighting Eagle multi-role light fighter aircraft.
  - 7th Tactical Fighter (Bulldogs) Squadron – flies the KAI FA-50PH Block 50 Fighting Eagle multi-role light fighter aircraft.
  - 105th Fighter Training (Blackjacks) Squadron – conducts jet qualification and training for future fighter-bound pilots. Flies the Aermacchi AS-211 jet training aircraft.
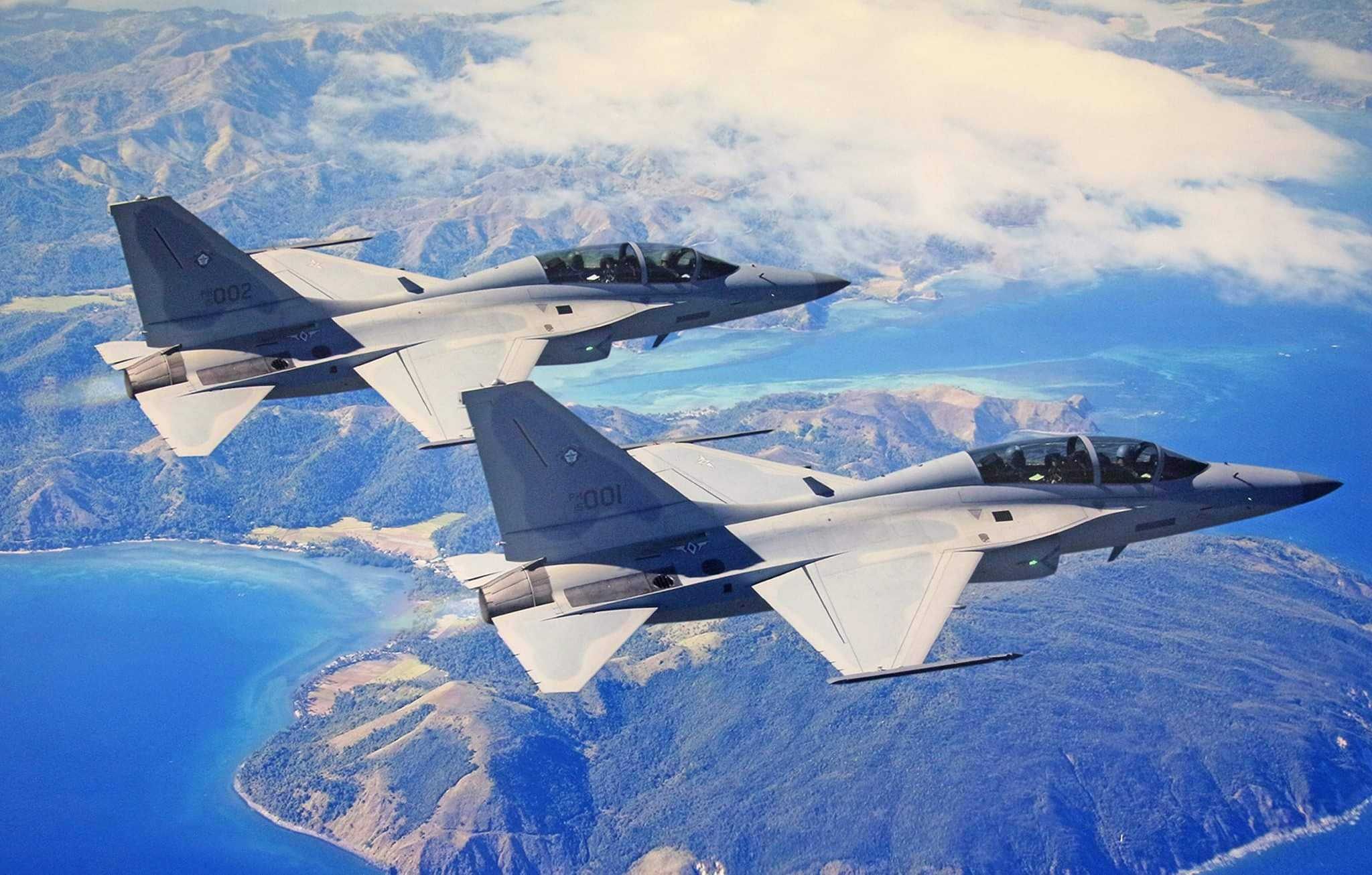
    Two PAF's FA-50PH fighter jets.

Non-Flying Units

- 580th Aircraft Control and Warning Wing, Wallace Air Station – it is responsible for operating air defense and surveillance radar systems, and command and control units of the PAF. It was reactivated on November 3, 2016, after being downgraded to a Group on April 1, 2005.
  - 581st Air Control and Warning Group - Wallace Air Station, San Fernando, La Union
    - 5811th Aircraft Control and Warning Squadron
    - 5812nd Aircraft Control and Warning Squadron
  - 582nd Air Control and Warning Group - Paredes Air Station, Pasuquin, Ilocos Norte
    - 5821st Aircraft Control and Warning Squadron
    - 5823rd Air Base Squadron
  - 583rd Air Control and Warning Group - Elum Air Station, La Paz, Zamboanga City
    - 5831st Aircraft Control and Warning Squadron
    - 5832nd Security Forces Squadron
  - 584th Air Control and Warning Group - Mt. Salakot Air Station, Puerto Princesa, Palawan
    - 5841st Aircraft Control and Warning Squadron
    - 5843rd Air Base Squadron
  - 586th Mobile Control and Reporting Squadron - Wallace Air Station, San Fernando, La Union
  - 588th Radar Maintenance & Support Squadron - responsible for technical maintenance and support
  - 589th Air Battle Management School (formerly 5811th Air Control and Training Squadron (ACTS)
- 960th Air and Missile Defense Group, Basa Air Base - responsible for aerial and missile defense operations of the PAF.
  - 961st Air and Missile Defense Squadron - operates the SPYDER Air Defense System (SPADS)
- Philippine Air Defense Control Center- the ADC's primary control center unit.
- Direct Air Support Force- serves as the ADC's coordination and guidance unit in air support operations.
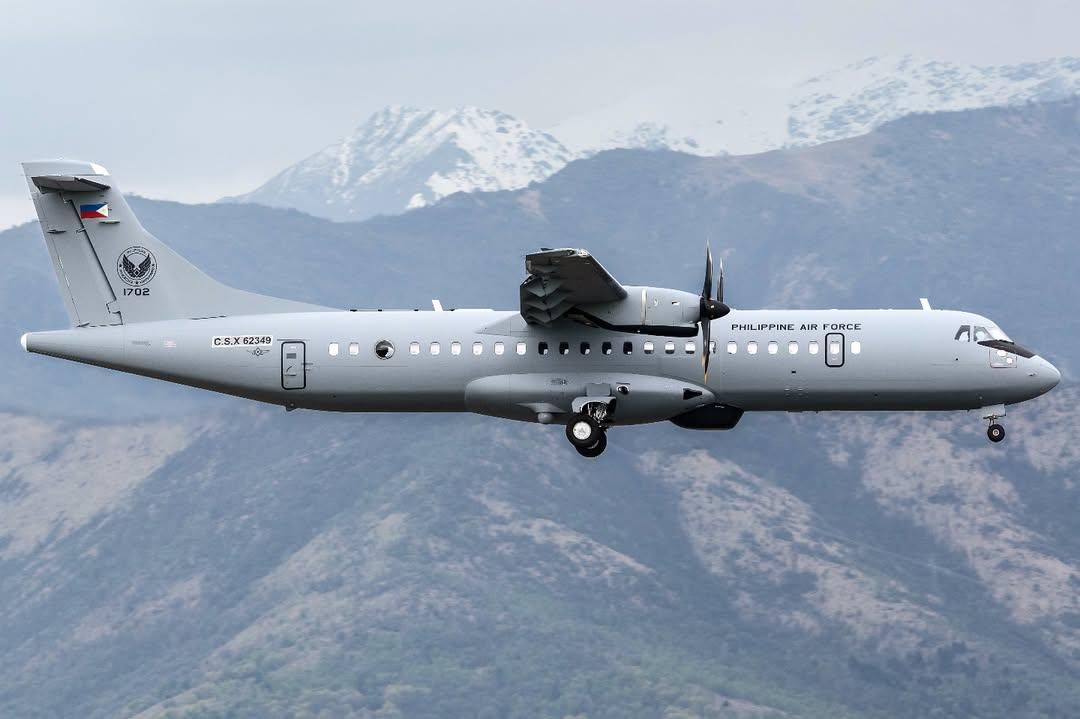
  ATR 72-600 MAR of the Philippine Air Force

- Air Mobility Command (AMC) - responsible for overall airlifts and aerial transport operations, including helicopter transport, VIP transport, and search and rescue (SAR) operations of the PAF and the AFP as a whole.

Flying Units

- 205th Tactical Helicopter Wing, Benito Ebuen Air Base – It is responsible for conducting tactical helicopter operations and limited air support, in support of the PAF and AFP. The wing flies the Bell 412EP and 412EPX, and the Sikorsky S-70i Black Hawk combat utility helicopters.
  - 206th Tactical Helicopter (Hornets) Squadron - Edwin Andrews Air Base - flies the S-70i Black Hawk
  - 207th Tactical Helicopter (Stingers) Squadron - Villamor Air Base - flies the Bell 412EP and Bell 412EPX
  - 208th Tactical Helicopter (Daggers) Squadron - Benito Ebuen Air Base - flies the S-70i Black Hawk
  - 210th Tactical Training Squadron
  - Support Unit:
    - 450th Maintenance and Support Group Benito Ebuen Air Base

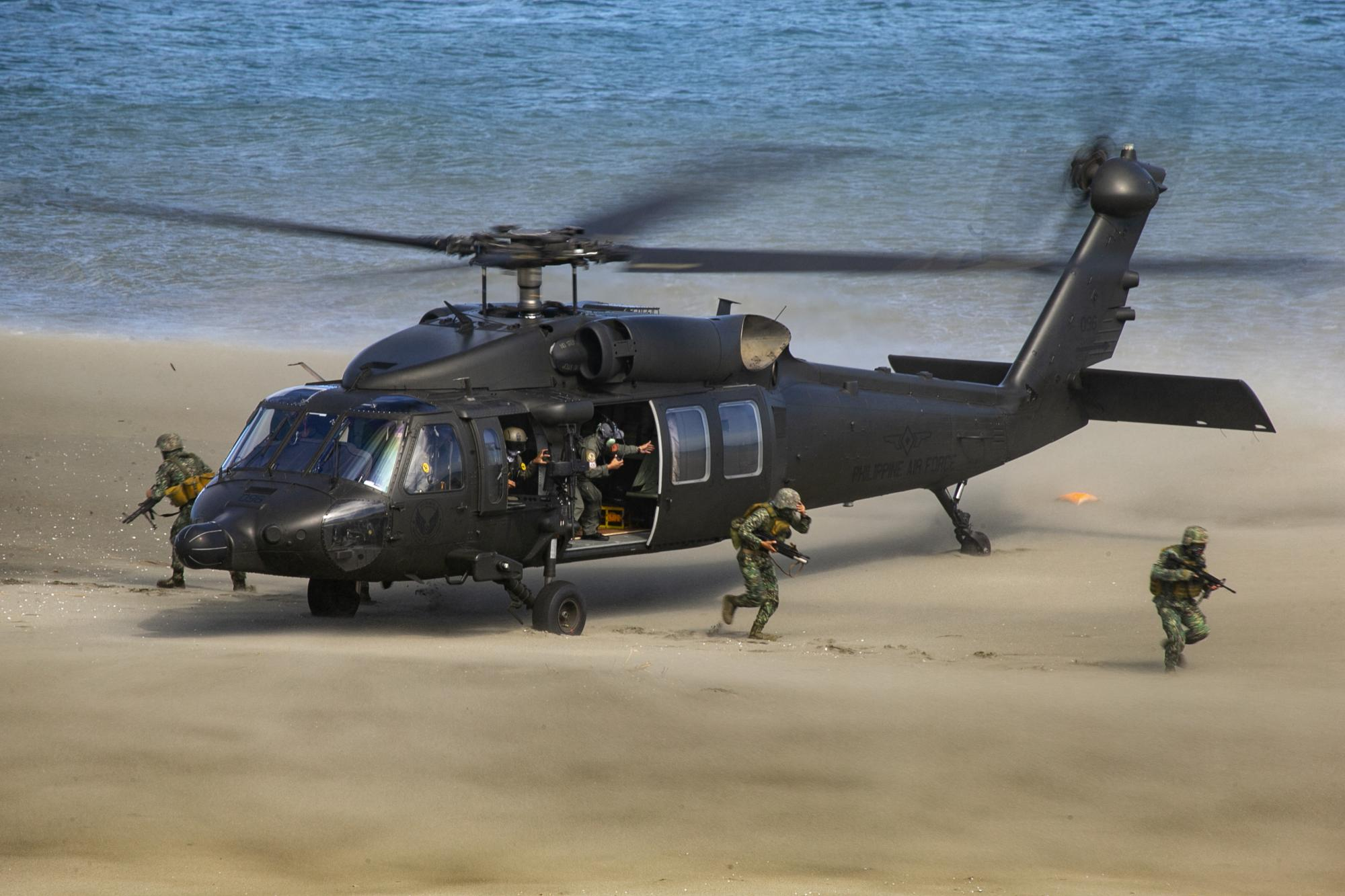
Philippine Air Force S-70i Black Hawk during Balikatan at Cagayan

- 220th Airlift Wing, Benito Ebuen Air Base – It provides tactical airlift operations in support of the AFP. It is also responsible for temporarily conducting long range maritime patrol and air reconnaissance.
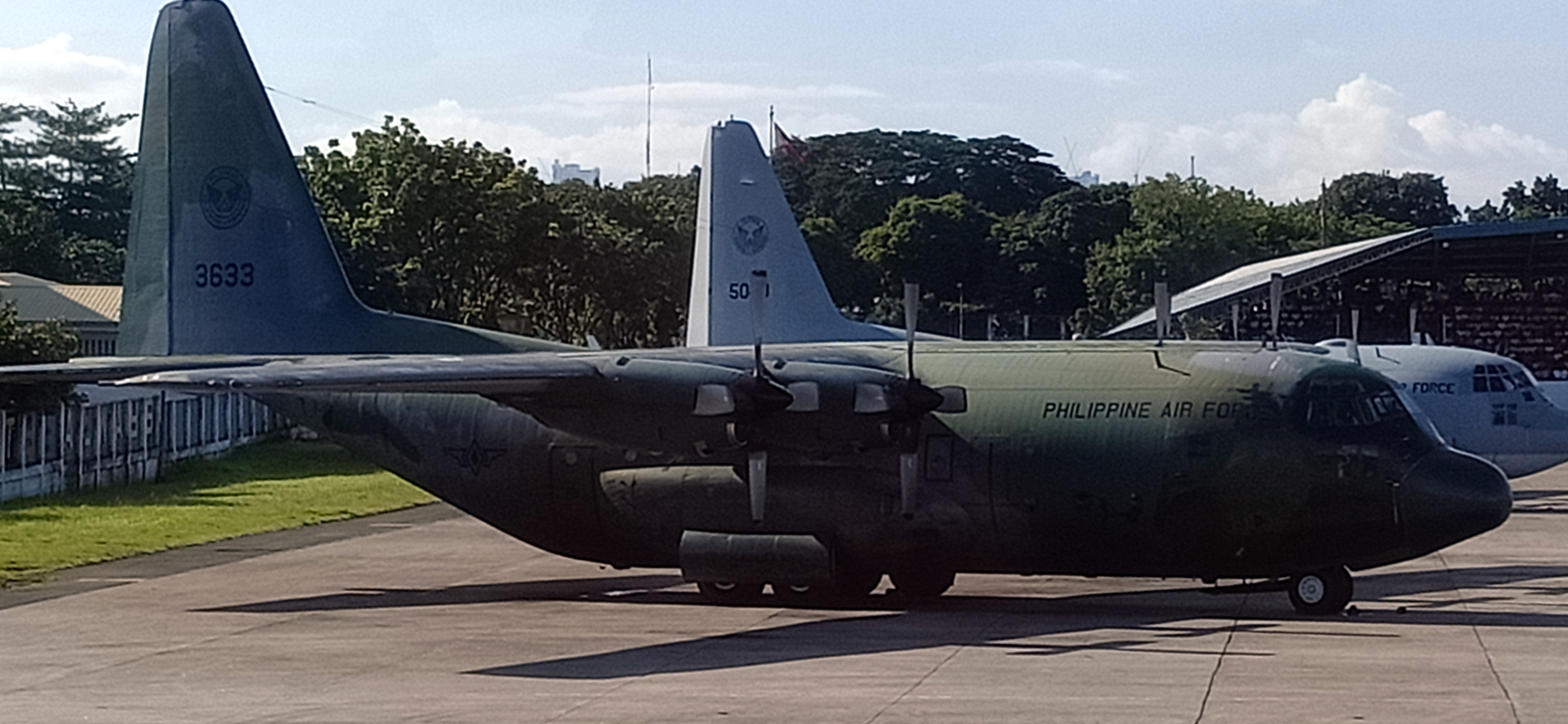
  Philippine Air Force (PAF) C-130 aircraft at the Villamor Air Base in Manila
  - 221st Airlift Squadron – flies the Airbus C-295M and Fokker F27 Friendship medium tactical transport aircraft
  - 222nd Airlift Squadron – flies the Lockheed C-130B/H/T Hercules heavy tactical transport aircraft
  - 223rd Airlift Squadron – flies the GAF N-22B/C Nomad and EADS-IAe NC-212i light tactical transport aircraft
  - 228th Transport Crew and Training Squadron
  - Support Unit:
    - 470th Maintenance and Supply Group Benito Ebuen Air Base
- 250th Presidential Airlift Wing, Villamor Air Base – It provides air transportation to the President of the Philippines, immediate members of presidential family, the Vice President of the Philippines and their immediate family members, heads of states, state guests, and very very important persons (VVIP). The unit is also attached to the Presidential Security Group (PSG).
  - 251st Presidential Airlift Squadron – flies the Airbus C-295M, Gulfstream G280 and Hawker 800 C2 / VVIP aircraft.
  - 252nd Presidential Airlift Squadron – flies the Bell 412EP/HP and Sikorsky S-70i Black Hawk VVIP helicopters.
  - 256th Security Squadron
  - 258th Security Squadron
  - 259th Supply and Support Squadron
  - 260th Field Maintenance Squadron
  - Support Units:
    - 480th Maintenance and Supply Group
      - 481st Field Maintenance Squadron
      - 482nd Supply and Support Squadron
- 505th Search and Rescue Group, Villamor Air Base – It is responsible for air search and rescue operations in support of the AFP and civilian agencies. The unit flies the Bell 205A, UH-1H Huey II, Bell UH-1H Super Huey, and the PZL W-3A Sokół as SAR helicopters, and the Sikorsky S-76A and S-70 as Air Ambulances.
  - 5051st Search and Rescue Squadron
  - 5052nd Search and Rescue Squadron

- Air Combat Command (ACC), Edwin Andrews Air Base - responsible for overall air to ground operations, including attack and ground support operations, and special forces missions.
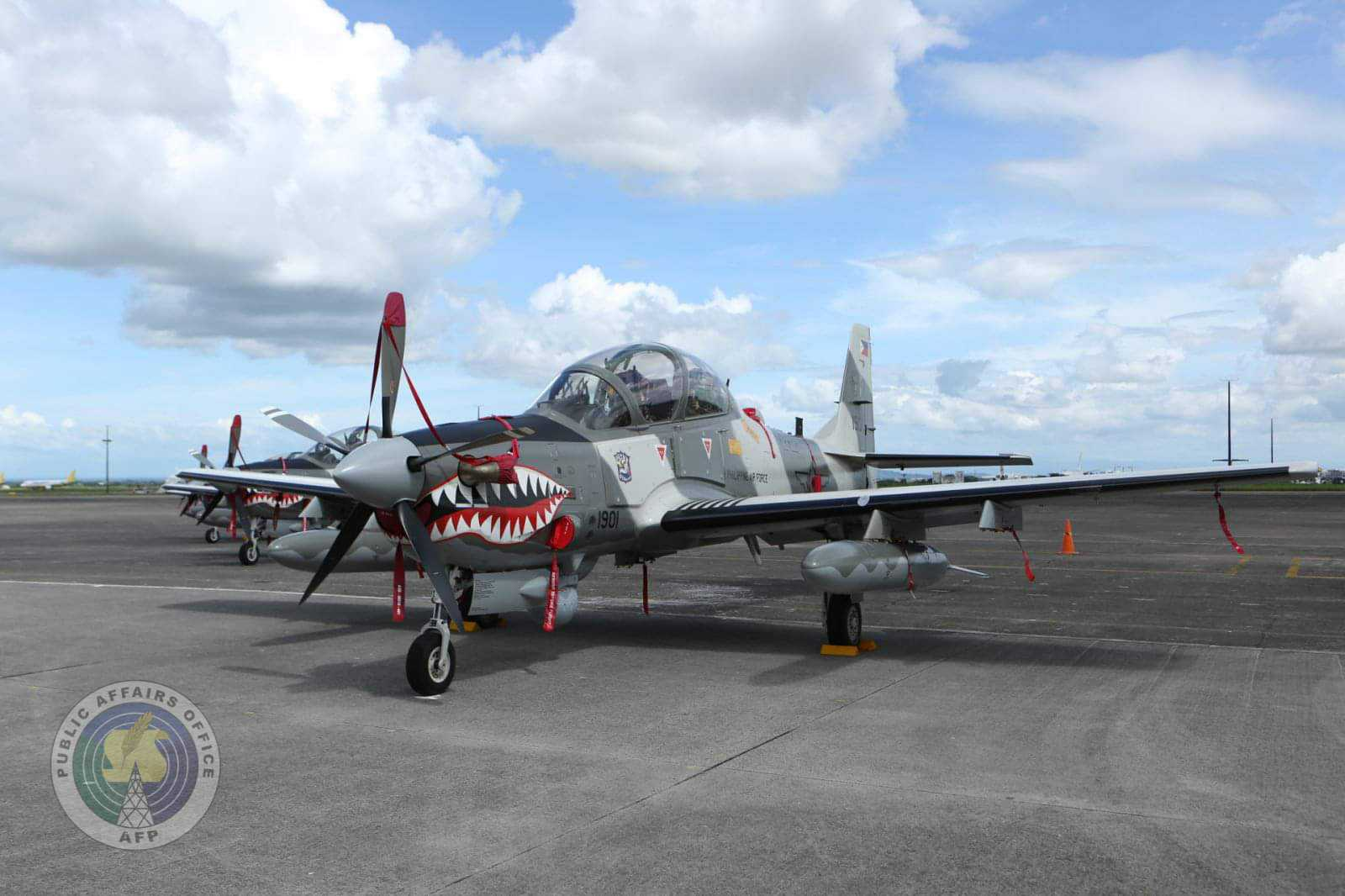
  A-29B Super Tucano attack aircraft of the Philippine Air Force during its turn-over and blessing ceremony at Clark Airbase

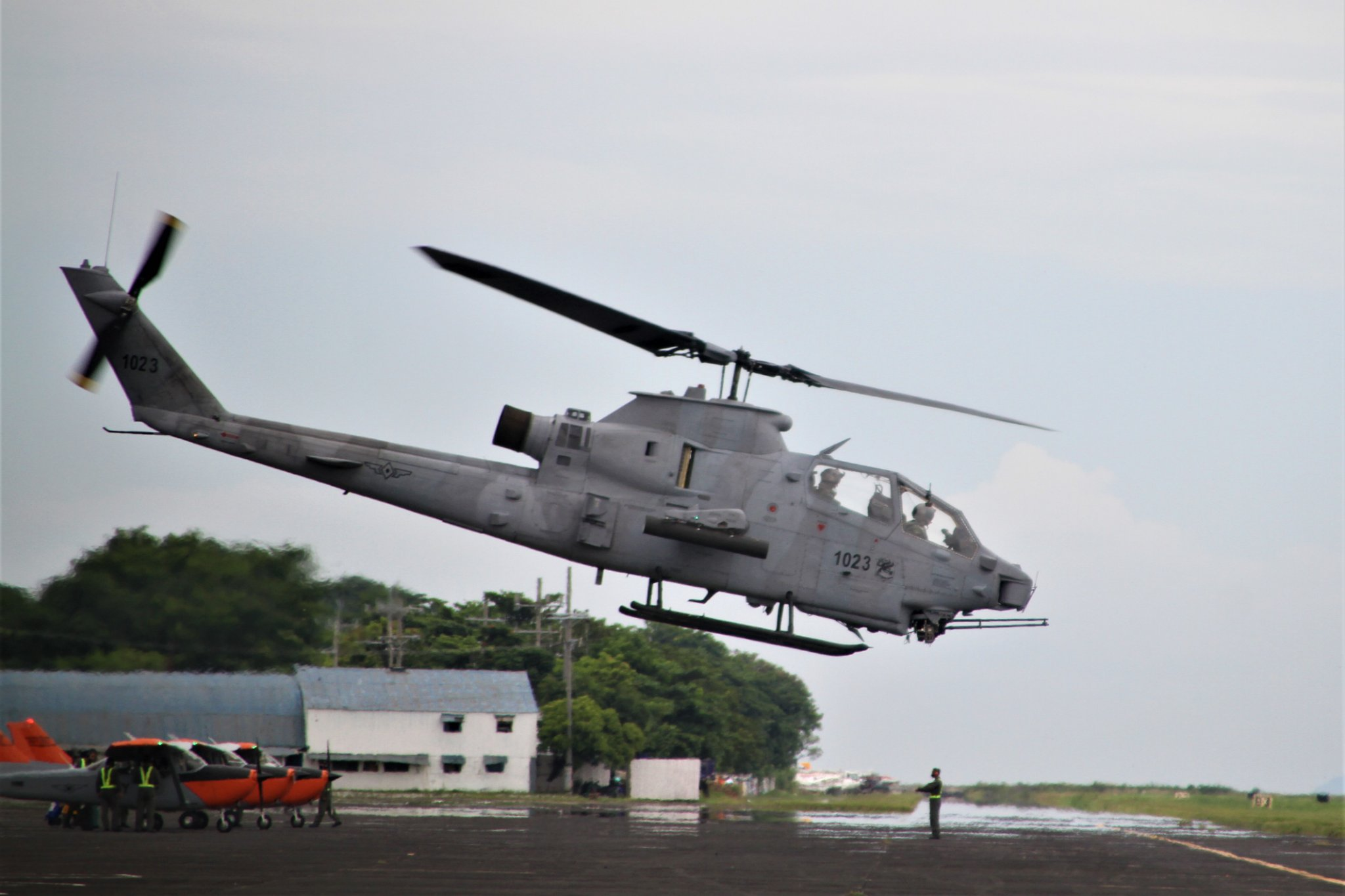
15th Strike Wing's AH-1S Cobra Attack Helicopter of the Philippine Air Force (PAF)

Flying Units

- 15th Strike Wing, Godofredo Juliano Air Base – It is responsible for providing combat air support to surface forces of the AFP. Nicknamed the Trojans.
  - 16th Attack (Eagles) Squadron, Danilo Atienza Air Base – flies the Aermacchi SF-260TP Warrior
  - 17th Attack (Jaguars) Squadron, Danilo Atienza Air Base – flies the Embraer A-29B Super Tucano
  - 18th Attack (Falcons) Squadron, Godofredo Juliano Air Base – flies the Leonardo AW109E Power and the TAI/AgustaWestland T129 ATAK
  - 19th Composite Tactical Training (Griffins) Squadron
  - 20th Attack (Firebirds) Squadron, Godofredo Juliano Air Base – flies the McDonnell Douglas MD-520MG Defender
  - 25th Composite Attack (Lobos) Squadron
  - Support Unit:
    - 460th Maintenance and Supply Group, Danilo Atienza Air Base - supports 15th Strike Wing
      - 461st Field and Depot Maintenance Squadron
      - 462nd Supply Squadron
      - 463rd Avionics Armaments & Maintenance Squadron

Non-Flying Units

- 710th Special Operations Wing, Colonel Ernesto Rabina Air Base – It is responsible for conducting special operations, counter terrorism, and defense of PAF bases and facilities.
  - 720th Special Operations Group – Villamor Air Base
  - 730th Combat Group
  - 740thThinking Warriors Combat Group – Fernando Air Base
  - 750th Combat Group – Camp General Emilio Aguinaldo
  - 760th Combat Group
  - 770th Special Operations Combat Support Group – Clark Air Base
  - 772nd Explosive Ordnance Disposal Squadron
  - 773rd K-9 Squadron

=== Support Commands and Units ===
- Installation Management Command (IMCOM), Villamor Air Base - responsible for managing, developing, maintenance, and administration of air bases, installations and real estate to support operational readiness.
  - 355th Aviation Engineering Wing - Basa Air Base
  - 520th Air Base Group - Villamor Air Base
  - 530th Air Base Group - Edwin Andrews Air Base
  - 540th Air Base Group - Basa Air Base
  - 550th Air Base Group - Fernando Air Base
  - 560th Air Base Group - Benito Ebuen Air Base
  - 570th Air Base Group - Antonio Bautista Air Base
  - 585th Air Base Group - Wallace Air Station
  - 590th Air Base Group - Godofredo Juliano Air Base (Lumbia Air Base), previously operating from Danilo Atienza Air Base
  - 600th Air Base Group - Clark Air Base
  - 790th Range Masters Air Base Group - Col. Ernesto Rabina Air Base
- Air Logistics Support Command (ALC), Clark Air Base
  - 410th Maintenance Wing
  - 420th Supply Wing
  - 440th Aircraft Maintenance Group, Fernando Air Base
- Air Force Reserve Command (AFRC), Villamor Air Base
- Education and Training Command (AETDC), Fernando Air Base
  - Philippine Air Force Flying School - Fernando Air Base - the primary training institution responsible for producing military aviators and pilots for the Philippine Air Force. Previously known as the 100th Training Wing and the Air Education and Training Command.
    - 101st Pilot Training Wildcats Squadron - conducts Primary Flying training, flies the Cessna T-41B/D/K Mescalero
    - 102nd Pilot Training Cougars Squadron - conducts Basic Flying training, flies the SIAI Marchetti SF-260FH trainer aircraft
    - 103rd Pilot Training Ravens Squadron - conducts Ground Academics and Foundational Military Instructions
  - Aviation and Excellence Nexus (PAF ALEN)
  - Air Warfare Center
  - PAF Basic Military School
  - PAF Logistics Training Center
  - PAF Officer School
  - PAF Officer Candidate School
  - PAF Non Commissioned Officer School
  - PAF Technical and Specialization School
  - Training Development Center
  - Air Force Research & Development Center
- Air Force Weather Center, Villamor Air Base - It is responsible for weather information, observation, reporting, and cloud seeding operations. Formerly known as the 900th Air Force Weather Group.

=== Units directly under Headquarters, PAF ===
- '300th Air Intelligence and Security Wing, Villamor Air Base - under the direct supervision of the Headquarters, PAF as a separate wing serving as primary unit for air intelligence, counterintelligence, surveillance and reconnaissance.
  - 301st Air Intelligence and Security Squadron - Fernando Air Base
  - 302nd Air Intelligence and Security Squadron - Clark Air Base
  - 303rd Aerial Reconnaissance Group
    - 3031st Unmanned Aerial Reconnaissance Squadron - flies the Hermes 900 and Hermes 450 medium altitude long endurance UAS, and ScanEagle II small UAS
    - 3032nd Aerial Reconnaissance Squadron - flies the ATR-72-600 Special Mission Aircraft and Cessna C208 Caravan ISR aircraft
- 950th Cyberspace and Electronic Warfare Wing - Villamor Air Base

=== Aerobatic teams ===
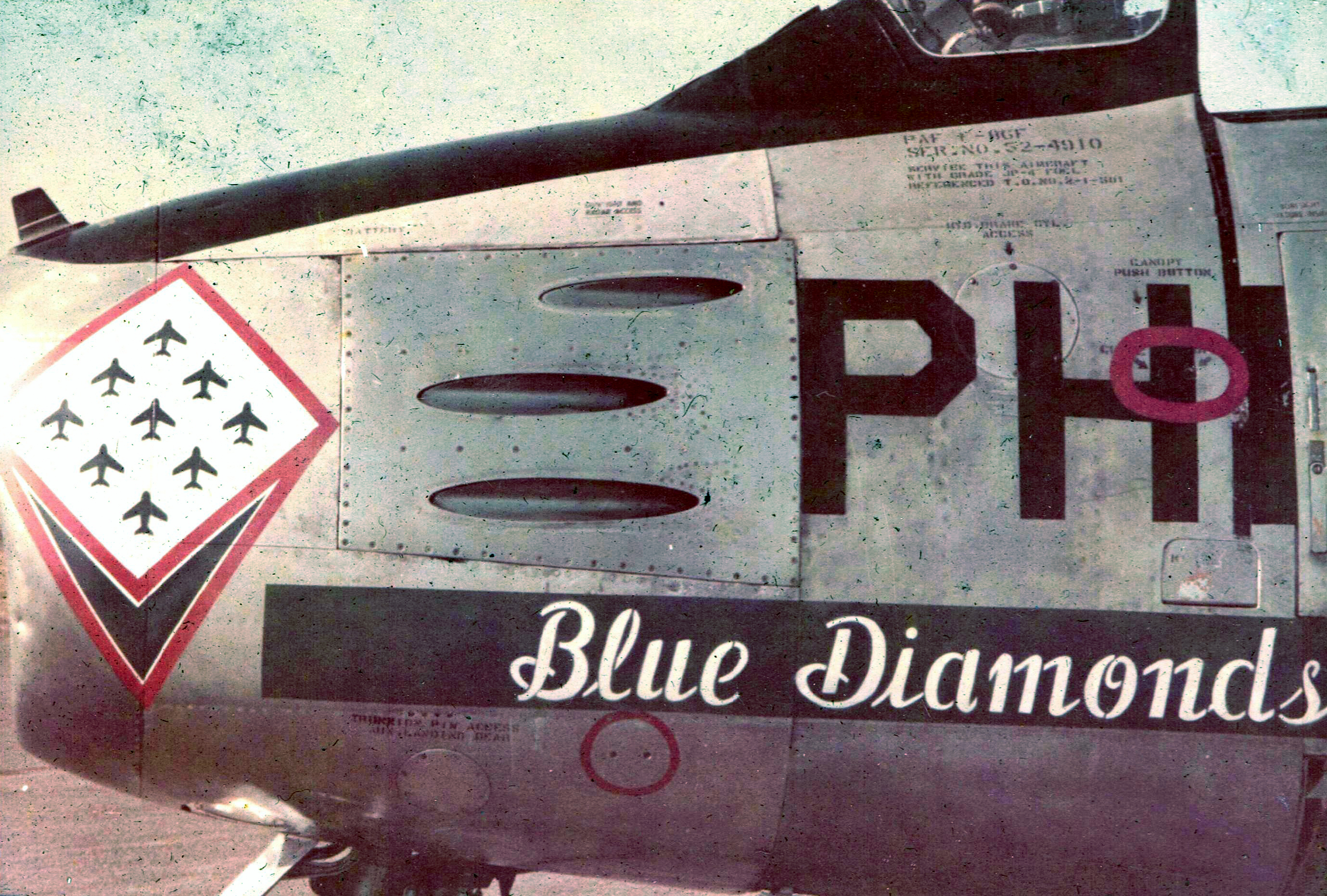
The Philippine Air Force Blue Diamonds "Sabre" emblem on a F-86F Sabre, circa 1962.

The Philippine Air Force had a number of aerobatic teams among which the PAF Blue Diamonds was the first to be founded, and was one of the oldest formal aerobatics teams in the world. The proceeding units listed are at inactive status due to the retirement of their aircraft, most notably the Northrop F-5 Freedom Fighters.

- Blue Diamonds – 5th Fighter Wing, Air Defense Command
- Red Aces – 7th Tactical Fighter Squadron, 5th FW
- Golden Sabres – 9th Tactical Fighter Squadron, 5th FW (merged with the Red Aces in 1973)
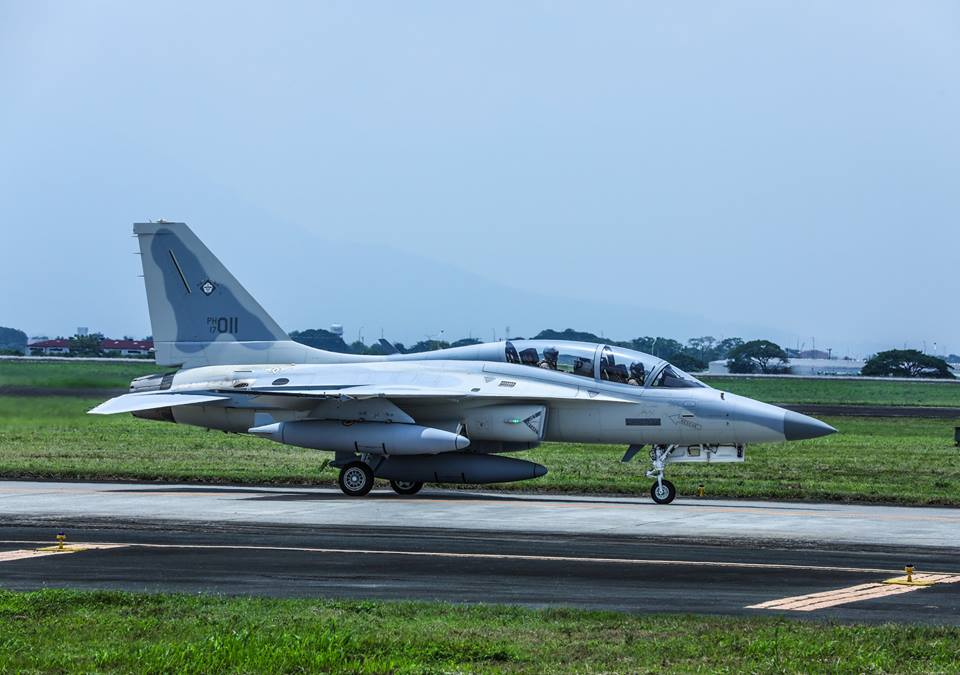
- A PAF FA-50 of the 7th Tactical Fighter Bulldogs Squadron
  Bubuyogs – PAF Helicopter Precision Demonstration Team, 205th Tactical Helicopter Wing

== Rank structure ==
=== Officers ===
Rank group	General / flag officers				Senior officers			Junior officers
Philippine Air Force
Philippine Air Force	General	Lieutenant general	Major general	Brigadier general	Colonel	Lieutenant colonel	Major	Captain	First lieutenant	Second lieutenant

=== Enlisted ===
Rank group	Senior NCOs						Junior NCOs	Enlisted
Philippine Air Force
Philippine Air Force	Chief master sergeant	Senior master sergeant	Master sergeant	Technical sergeant	Staff sergeant	Sergeant	Airman first class	Airman second class	Airman

== Bases ==

The Philippine Air Force has nine major air bases and several radar, communications, and support facilities located throughout the archipelago. Shared facilities with commercial airports being used as detachments by the Tactical Operations Command were not included here.

Luzon
Name (former name)	Location	Description
Colonel Jesus Villamor Air Base	Pasay, Metro Manila	GHQ, PAF
Clark Air Base	Angeles City	HQ, ADC HQ, ALC
Colonel Ernesto Rabina Air Base	Capas, Tarlac	HQ, 710SPOW
Cesar Basa Air Base	Floridablanca, Pampanga	
Basilio Fernando Air Base (Lipa Air Base)	Lipa, Batangas	HQ, AETDC
Major Danilo Atienza Air Base (Sangley Point Air Base)	Cavite City, Cavite	
Naval Station Ernesto Ogbinar (Wallace Air Station)	San Fernando, La Union	
Isidro Juan Paredes Air Station	Pasuquin, Ilocos Norte	
Jose Gozar Air Station	Lubang, Occidental Mindoro	
Restituto Parañal Air Station	Jose Panganiban, Camarines Norte	
Visayas
Benito Ebuen Air Base (Mactan Air Base)	Mactan, Cebu	
Guiuan Airfield	Guiuan, Eastern Samar	
Antonio Bautista Air Base	Puerto Princesa, Palawan	
Mt. Salakot Air Station	Puerto Princesa, Palawan	
Mindanao
Edwin Andrews Air Base (San Roque Airfield; Moret Field)	Zamboanga City	
Rajah Buayan Air Station	General Santos	
Colonel Godofredo Juliano Air Base (Lumbia Airfield)	Cagayan de Oro, Misamis Oriental	
Davao Air Station	Davao City	

== Equipment ==
The Philippine Air Force has made use of its existing equipment to fulfill its mandate while modernization projects are underway. The Republic Act No. 7898 declares the policy of the State to modernize the military to a level where it can effectively and fully perform its constitutional mandate to uphold the sovereignty and preserve the patrimony of the republic. The law, as amended, has set conditions that should be satisfied when the defense department procures major equipment and weapon systems for the air force.

These are acquisition projects of the government that have been signed and awaiting delivery for the modernization of the air force:

- 12 KAI FA-50 Block 70 multirole light fighter jets on order worth ₱18.9 billion ($700 million)
- 6 additional Embraer A29B Super Tucano turboprop light attack aircraft worth ₱6.59 billion.
- 1 C-130H cargo aircraft on order from the United States.
- 3 C-130H set to be transferred from the US following talks between Philippine President Bongbong Marcos and US President Joe Biden in Washington, D.C., which also included the transfer of 2 Island-class patrol boats and 2 Marine Protector-class patrol boats to the Philippine Navy.
- 3 C-130J-30 on order under the Additional Air Transport Capability Project worth ₱22.2 billion.
- 6 additional NC-212i light transport aircraft from Indonesia worth ₱4.16 billion.
- 2 ATR 72MP on order under the procurement of the Long Range Patrol Aircraft worth ₱5.976 billion.
- 47 S-70i Black Hawk combat helicopters from Poland. Making the Philippines the world’s largest operator of the helicopter variant.
- 8 Subaru-Bell UH-2 combat helicopters are currently on order ₱6.39 billion.
- The defense department has purchased the Rafael SPYDER defence system for ₱6 billion. One (1) battery plus the associated radar systems, command and control, support vehicles, and ammunition set to be delivered in 2024. It uses the Tatra T815-7 truck as its mounted chassis.
- Three fixed radar systems and one mobile radar system have been ordered from Japan for air surveillance with a tentative delivery in 2022. One system has been commissioned in December 2023, and one mobile radar system was turned over in April 2024.
