= Blue Diamonds (aerobatic team) =

The Blue Diamonds Philippine Air Force Aerobatic Team
- The Blue Diamonds emblem
- Active: 1953 – 2005
- Country: Philippines
- Branch: Philippine Air Force
- Role: Aerobatic flight display team
- Size: varies per season
- Base: Basa Air Base, Floridablanca, Pampanga, Philippines 1953–2005

Aircraft flown
- Fighter: 1953-1955 P-51D Mustang; 1957–1967 F-86F Sabre; 1968-2005 F-5A/B Freedom Fighter

The PAF Blue Diamonds is the national aerobatic team of the Philippine Air Force (PAF). Assigned to the 5th Fighter Wing, the unit is based at Basa Air Base in Floridablanca, Pampanga. Founded in 1952, the Blue Diamonds is one of oldest formal flying aerobatic teams in the world, along with United States Air Force Thunderbirds founded in 1953, the United States Navy Blue Angels formed in 1946, and the Patrouille de France of the French Air Force formed in 1931. The Blue Diamonds has been inactive since 2005.

== History ==
The Blue Diamonds have utilized a variety of aircraft during its active years, including the North American P-51 Mustang, the North American F-86 Sabre, and the Northrop F-5 Freedom Fighter.

=== P-51 Mustang Era (1952- 1955) ===
1952 Two Basa-based P-51D Mustangs took off in formation from Fernando Air Base in Lipa city. Immediately, upon airborne, the two planes went on an inverted flight and completed their negative G-climb into a roll. Flight Lead 2Lt Claro M. Recto Jr. and wingman 2Lt Jose FL Gonzalez were grounded even before they could land at Basa. The brief performance, however, served all the more to convince Gonzalez that a precision aerial team was possible.

With the approval of the 6th Tactical Squadron Commander, Major Jose L Rancudo, Lt Gonzalez went from one pilot to another, casually judging character and selecting members. By the first quarter of 1953, he had a basic four-man team composed of Lts Isidro B Agunod (left wing), Ricardo T Singson (right wing), Pascual C Servida (slot), with himself as the lead. Lt Cesar L Raval was taken in as airborne reserve. They constituted the PAF's first Aerial Precision Team.

1953 November, they participated in an air show during the Philippine Aviation Week. The team flying P-51 Mustangs, did the roll and the Immelman turn immediately after take –off. The spectators in the know were particularly awed to see Lt Gonzalez’ Mustang hanging inverted on its propeller at the top of the Immelman turn. It was a rare sight to behold. The demonstration was termed a historical feat.

1954 2Lt Generoso B Jesena was admitted as the team's second reserve. The team was officially proclaimed as The Blue Diamond, as identification of their basic diamond formation. The word Blue was affixed as an apparent referral to the Air Force.

The team stretched to a five-plane formation and thrilled spectators as they swooped to execute complicated exercises.

=== F-86F Sabrejet Era (1957- 1967) ===
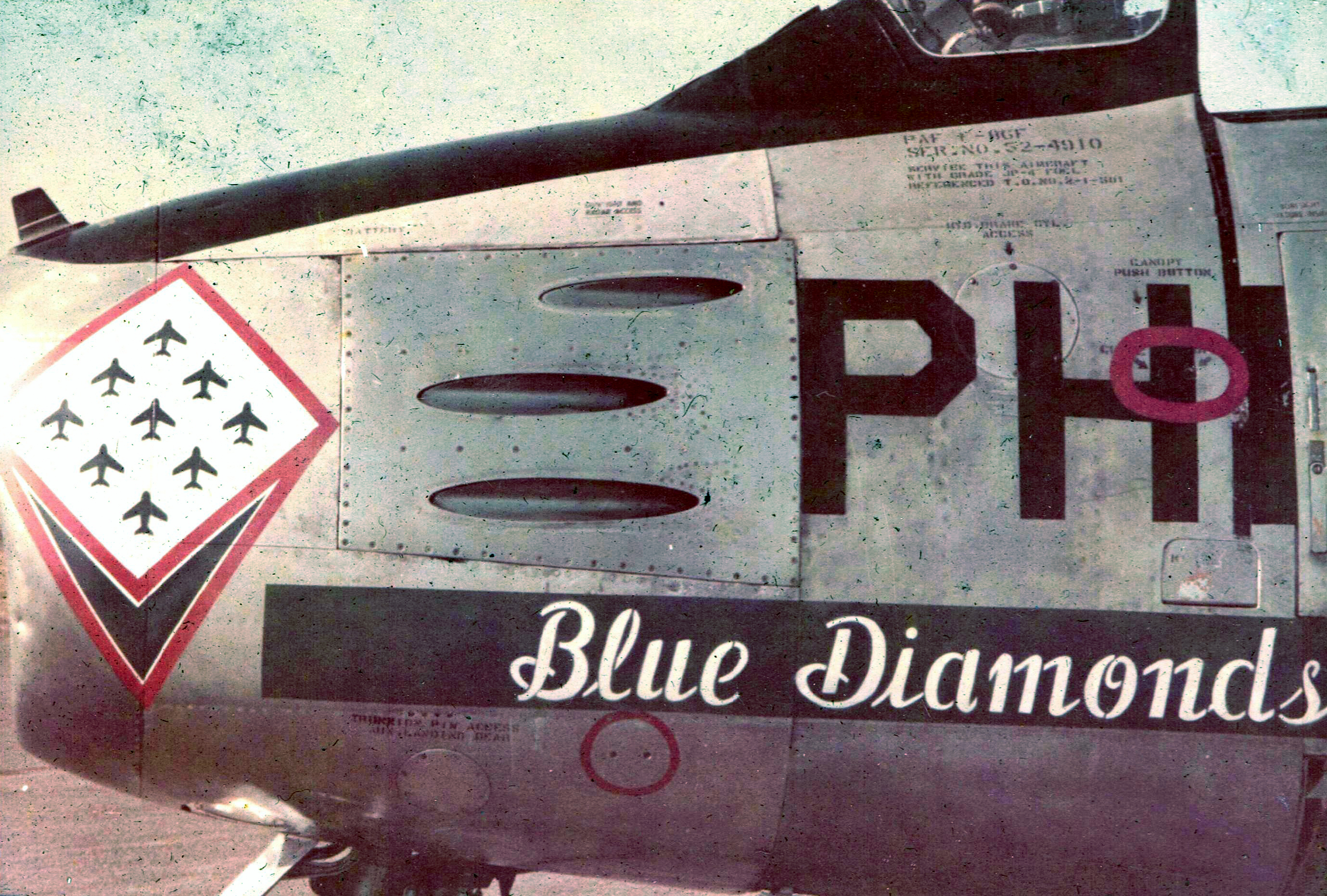
The Blue Diamonds "Sabre" emblem on an F-86F

The prop-driven P-51 Mustangs were gradually phased out and the Filipino pilots transitioned in the first T-33 jet trainers flown in from Japan. This temporarily halted the public exhibition of the Blue Diamond as the modernization of the Air Force took place.

1957 The PAF acquired the more modern F-86F Sabrejets. A number of fighter pilots and some members of the Blue Diamond were made to undergo jet-flying courses at Clark Air Base and in various USAF service schools.

With the absence of the original members who were into jet transition training, a new team was formed employing the venerable Mustangs, if only to maintain the growing air show tradition.

Col. Godofredo Juliano, the 5th FW Commander, designated Lt. Lino C Abadia Jr as team leader. Abadia was from the 7th Tactical Fighter Squadron and he proceeded to forge a team from the fliers in his unit. Unfortunately he died in a Mustang crash a day before the Aviation Week Performance.

Weeks earlier, unaware of the formation of the Mustangs contingency team, Lt. Gonzalez, together with the 6th TFS pilots, flew hard under fifty hours, wrestling to get acquainted with the first Sabre jets. Their performance, done in neat precision and audacity stole the admiration of crowds and the respect of foreign flyers and visiting head of states that came to view the vaunted Sabres.

Before the year passed through, another pilot was lost. Capt. Antonio Roig had long wanted to join the aerobatics team. In one of the team's rehearsals over Clark, he tagged along and from a distance followed the aerial repertoire. His engine flamed out. Roig's right wing plowed into the field in a fiery crash.

1958 The team increased to eight aircraft and for the first time the use of smoke was introduced. Silhouetted against the sky, the smoke outlined the exact movements of the planes and greatly enhanced their appeal.

1959 In the year's air show, participated by the American and Chinese Air Forces, a nine-member Blue Diamond team with three airborne reserves virtually stole the thunder from the USAF Thunderbirds.

At the start of the performance, team leader Gonzalez stunned the crowd when he took off and rushing toward them snapped his Sabre into a perfect roll with gears and flaps extended only meters from the ground, then at the last moment pulled up into an astonishing Immelman turn, stabbing in the reverse direction. It was the first time that at such low altitude and airspeed aviation on F-86F performed such daring maneuvers. He capped his solo number with a clean slow roll.

The applause was loudest when the team went into a difficult cloverleaf with four loops and twists at the top of each leaf, then broke into a neat bomb burst breakaway.

Born fliers, team members owed their proficiency to constant practice more than anything else. Gonzalez rarely flew with the whole band. His normal practice runs involved only the basic 4-plane diamond formations.

In one practice, Gonzalez heard a loud explosion from his cockpit. His left armament panel tore off its rivets (Capts. Angel Mapua and Romeo Almario as his right and left wingman and Reinfredo Barrientos as slot). Mapua was able to slide out, but Barrientos rammed into Almario. Although both aircraft suffered major wing damage, they were able to safely land at Basa Air Base.

Before the year ended though, the team was mourning the loss of 2nd Lt. Gilberto Ledesma when he crashed while practicing aerial combat.

1960 The Blue Diamond emerged with a new team leader, Capt. Angel Mapua. Under him, the Blue Diamond's membership ballooned to sixteen, by far the largest PAF aerial demonstration team ever organized. For the first time, the members of the Blue Diamond were chosen from other squadrons.

The team renamed their group the Blue Diamonds, the letter S added, hinting a quality of individuality in oneness and oneness in individuality.

One team member never made it to the actual performance. 2nd Lt. Norberto de Guzman lost his life in a crash while on a routine mission.

1961 “Deadly Gun” Capt. Marcelo Barbero Jr led the team in 1961. Switching to 12 planes, they treated their audience to a colorful repertoire by using colored smoke burnt out of the exhaust pipes of the Sabre jets, instead of the standard white smoke.

Under Barbero's leadership, the Blue Diamonds enjoyed the widest publicity ever received.

1962 Capt. Isidro Agunod who led a nine–plane formation during the Aviation Week celebration, introduced new maneuvers.

The team performed only for 10 minutes because of a tragedy. The crowd was never aware of what actually happened. Weather conditions were cited as the main reason for the aborted performance. 2nd Lt. Salvador Abadesco, a member of the team developed engine trouble during the performance. He separated from the flight and proceeded to Laguna Bay. He tried ditching the aircraft but be didn't make it.

1963 The team did not perform. Taking a lesson from last year's interruption of the air show, the CAA decided to move the aviation week from November to March to avoid the seasonal inclement weather conditions and thereby practically safeguard future shows.

Instead, the PAF activated and sent the 9th Tactical Fighter Limbas Squadron to Congo, Africa in response to the United Nations call for concerted peacekeeping efforts. Several members of the team readily transferred to the 9th TFS to see action in Africa.

1964 The next performance came in March 1964 at the resumption of the annual Aviation Week. Capt. Angel Mapua once again led the Blue Diamonds.

The nine –man team with two reserves started its show with a whifferdill, a loop in formation wedge, and a right roll then on top to a wedge switching to a diamond and back to a roll in wedge. Then came the impressive bomb burst followed by a stunt pass and a 360-degree low level turns, spontaneously executing a lazy eight, then on to pitch out before landing.

1965 In 1965, the PAF acquired the more sophisticated jet-powered, twin engine supersonic F-5A Freedom Fighter. However, it was only in 1968 that the Blue Diamonds shifted to the Freedom Fighter. While the members were learning the feel of the aircraft, the team stuck to the Sabres for their demonstration-placing premium on polished excellence under Capt. Mapua's leadership.

1966 The Blue Diamonds’ six plane demonstration in 1966 marked the last time they utilized the F-86 Sabres. It was a proud moment for the Sabres which were flying farewell to the team and prouder for the pilots who flew, as it capped an era tied to the last war and heralded a new age in flying.

1967 As in the case of the Mustang-Sabre jets transition, the initiation to the Freedom Fighters took time and led to the scrapping of the aviation activities.

=== F-5A/B Freedom Fighter Era (1968 - 2005) ===
1968 Basa unveiled a six-man team with Maj Rodolfo Franco in the lead and the Blue Diamonds resurged to wild clapping. Their spectacular performance on May 2, 1968, with the faster and sleeker F-5As formally ushered the Air Force into a new era.

The high level of dexterity shown in the maneuvers also brought the team on an unprecedented goodwill mission to Taiwan.

1969 Under Maj Franco, the team reversed to a more difficult downward bomb burst and a four-man “four-point-in-place-roll”. Other maneuvers performed included 360 degree low level turns in diamond with two stunt pilots joining the four F-5s into a delta formation that went into a loop, then a whifferdill leading to a pitch out before landing.

For their outstanding performances, the PAF Commanding general, Brig Gen Jesus Singson, awarded the team members their “Kahusayan Awards”.

1970 The members never sat on their laurels. They kept flying and soaring, perfecting their maneuvers for the knowing eyes of the public. Lt Col Franco again led the team over the heads of everybody during the Aviation Week festivities.

1971 When Col Antonio Sotelo assumed the command of the 6th Tactical fighter Squadron, he tasked Lt CoL Loven Abadia to form a new Blue Diamond Team. He scouted and identified some of his flyers that were good and asked them to join in test practicing the maneuvers. On a clear February 1971, a five-man team did rolls over Basa.

Two more aerobatic teams were activated, the six – man Sabrejet teams _the 7th TFS PAF Red Aces led by Lt Col Napoleon Angeles, and the 9th TFS PAF Golden Sabres under Lt Col Antonio Bautista. The emergence of the three aerobatic teams was made possible by the large number of aircraft in Basa inventory at that time. The ratio grew to one pilot per aircraft bearing his name, with several more planes in reserve.

1972 The Blue Diamonds, codenamed Cobras, remained as top drawers in Manila for sentimental reasons. The Red Aces of Bulldongs roared over Luzon, streaking over Baguio, Laoag and Pangasinan. The Golden Sabres of Limbas took care of the south sweeping over the cities of Cebu, Bacolod, Iloilo, Cagayan de Oro, Zamboanga, Davao, Tacloban, Surigao and Jolo in a full seven-day performance run.

On the account of familiarity and fame, the more sophisticated aircraft, the Blue Diamonds always took the breathless attention of the public and reviews from the media.

1973 The Blue Diamonds, led by Lt Col Armando Garcia, combined with the composite Red Aces/Golden Sabres team under Lt Col Antonio Bautista to perform on the 38th Foundation Anniversary of the PAF. It was standard aerial precision fare done into two groups, gleaming with undiminished beauty and daring.

Before the year ended, Lt Col Abadia took over the leadership.

1974 Lt Col Abadia lead a six – plane diamond formation in a low pass before veering away for their first aerial number adding flourish to the historic Kasaysayan ng Lahi during the Miss Universe Beauty Pageant.

Abadia's team featured a six plane borne like a ribbon in a graceful series of rolls and loops. The difficult maneuver with the bigger number of supersonic F-5s was consummated with the participation of his two uncannily accomplished wingmen, 1Lts Adelberto Yap and Carmelito Nemeño.

1975 The worsening energy crisis sapping the country compelled the Air Force to severely limit air shows of the Blue Diamonds. Economic forces caught up with the military establishment and threw priority efforts to the insurgent countryside.

Still, one show got on the air. On July 4, 1975, the Blue Diamonds jumped for a friendly demonstration over Clark Air Base to highlight the occasion of the Filipino-American Friendship and US Independence Day.

1976 Despite the tight energy crunch, the Blue Diamonds was able to eke out two performances in 1976. A basic diamond formation with two reserves under Lt Col Abelardo de Dios was unveiled in time for the July 4th Bicentennial celebrations of the US. The team performed over Cubi Point at Subic Naval Base in Olongapo City. They went to a basic repertoire and receive rave reviews form the predominantly American audience. For this performance, they were conferred the Kahusayan Award.

The Blue Diamonds second performance that year was in Metro Manila, on the invitation of the Manila Aero Club.

1977 The Blue Diamonds lead this time by Col Jose Balajadia Jr., stretched its wings in a four-plane diamond formation and soared to cap the annual Air Force Day rites.

The team was constrained to perform only over Basa. The whole aerobatic sequence was covered by the TV Program Ms Elaneous of Channel 7 and watched by millions of tele-viewers.

The feature of the team brought the pilots into direct contact with the youth and bared a classic covenant among flyers—that of never compromising any mission.

1978 The year 1978 had a nine-man line up under the leadership of Lt Col Ildefonso Dulinayan. The team had their only performance at Baguio City, on coordination made by PAF Gen Ernesto Bueno.

The worsening energy crunch, however, led to the scrapping of the air show. PAF bosses were worried at the criticisms the performance might generate, given the tight energy situation faced by the country.

1986 Eight years later in 1986, the famed aerobatic team hinted its deathless existence when the team was reactivated. Lt Col Ricardo Faustino spearheaded the Blue Diamonds, sweeping with six planes in a graceful and elegant display of showmanship. Rolling, arching, frolicking, diving and turning in neat precision, once more bringing pride and glory and fame and once more demonstrating the Blue Diamonds vaunted skill.

1995 By 1995, the team was revived using the same old reliable F-5A fighter plane, the very same aircraft used since 1968. It was noted that the team was formed out of self-reliance, skill and experience. No former Blue Diamonds member did taught the team the trade. The team comprises Major Enrique dela Cruz as team leader, Captain Raul del Rosario, Captain Rhain Morota, Lieutenant Gerald Da-anton, and Captain Gilbert Bartolome.

1996 - 1998 Heading the team in this PAF 50th Anniversary edition is Captain Raul del Rosario. In 1998, another boost for the Blue Diamonds came when 5 more F-5s from Korea were given to the PAF. This triggered the start of regaining back the accolade bestowed to the honor of the Blue Diamonds and was dubbed “Return to Glory”. Their performances were primarily in connection with the Philippine Independence Day Centennial celebration.

1999 The famed aerobatic team once again delighted the crowds during the PAF 52nd Anniversary Celebration at Luneta. A new breed of fighter pilots duplicated the same maneuvers that reflected luster to the team over the years. No less than the 5th Fighter Wing Commander BGen Adelberto Yap molded the team in its finest form with Captain Edimar Ortega as team leader.

== Aircraft ==
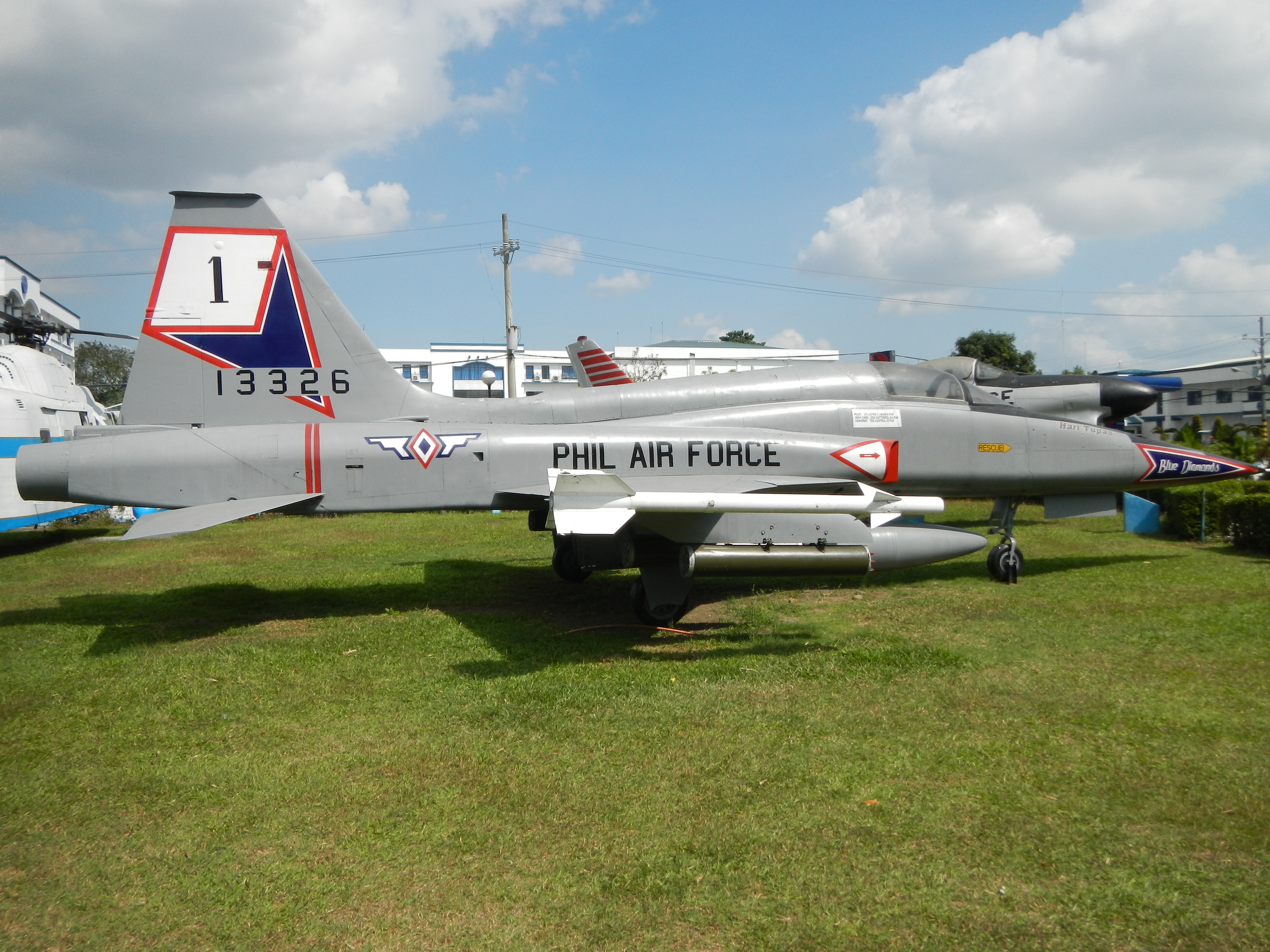
Blue Diamonds F-5

Type	Examples	In use
P-51D Mustang	5 aircraft	1953–1959
F-86F	8 aircraft	1959–1968
F-5 Freedom Fighter	12 aircraft	1968-late 2005
