= Cesar Basa Air Base =

Air base in Pampanga, Philippines

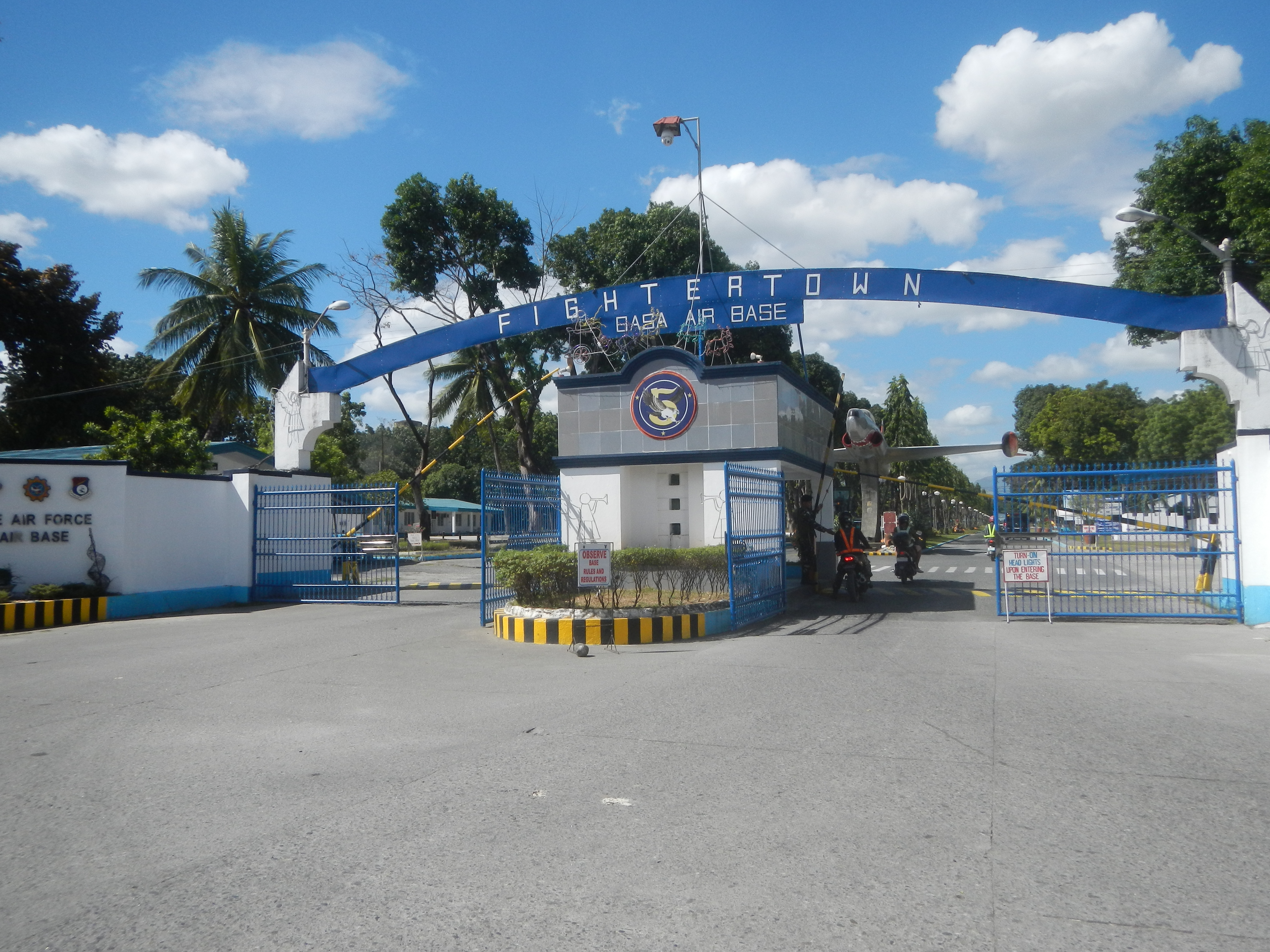
- Gate of Basa Air Base
- IATA: none; ICAO: RPUF

Summary
- Airport type: Military
- Operator: Philippine Air Force
- Location: Floridablanca, Pampanga
- Built: November 1941
- In use: 1941–1945 (Japan); 1945–1947 (United States); 1947–present (Philippines)
- Commander: Brigadier General Pedro S. Francisco III, PAF
- Occupants: 5th Fighter Wing headquarters; 355th Aviation Engineering Wing; 1302nd Dental Dispensary
- Elevation AMSL: 33 ft (10 m)
- Coordinates: 14°59′00″N 120°29′00″E

Map
- Location of Cesar Basa Air Base

Runways
Direction	Length		Surface
Direction	ft	m	Surface
03/21	9,186	2,800	Asphalt/Concrete

Cesar Basa Air Base, or simply Basa Air Base (formerly known as Floridablanca Airfield) (ICAO: RPUF), is an airbase currently operated by the Philippine Air Force. It is located at Floridablanca, Pampanga about 40 miles (64 km) northwest of Metro Manila in the Philippines. It is named after César Basa, one of the pioneer fighter pilots of the Philippine Air Force.

The base was built and used by the US Army Air Corps before the Second World War and was captured and used by the Imperial Japanese Army Air Force during the early stages of World War II. Allied military forces recaptured it during the later stages of the war.

== History ==
=== World War II ===
Company B, 803rd Engineer (Aviation) Battalion, began work on what was originally known as Del Carmen Field in mid-November 1941. It was to be major airdrome with multiple runways designed to serve heavy bombers that were to be assigned to the Philippines prior to the start of World War II. The engineers were not able to complete the field, and only the 34th Pursuit Squadron, Far East Air Force (FEAF), with its P-35 aircraft operated from there. Several P-40's from other FEAF pursuit squadrons used Del Carmen as an emergency landing strip after the bombing of Clark and Iba Fields on December 8, 1941.

In late December 1941, during the early stages of World War II, the facility was successfully captured and taken over by the Japanese Army. The base was used by the Japanese as an auxiliary airfield. It was in this aerodrome complex of Clark, Floridablanca, Porac and Mabalacat airfield where the scheme to employ "kamikaze" fighters was first conceived and launched.

In January 1945, the USAAF re-established a presence at the airfield when the United States Sixth Army cleared the area of Japanese forces. The 312th Bombardment Group (19 April-13 August 1945) based A-20 Havocs and the 348th Fighter Group (15 May-6 July 1945) based P-47 Thunderbolts and P-51 Mustangs at the airfield. In 1945, during the period of Philippine liberation to joint U.S. and Filipino troops, the U.S. Army Air Forces enlarged the airfield further to accommodate B-17s and B-24s, which were used for air strikes against Japan.

The United States government later turned over the installation to the Philippines. On August 22, 1947, three M35 2-1/2 ton cargo trucks ferried in the 2nd Tactical Fighter Squadron to lay the groundwork for a fighter base.

On September 9, 1947, the Headquarters Composite Group, with a subordinate unit known as the Floridablanca Base Service Detachment, was organized to continue the pioneering venture. The 6th and 7th Fighter squadrons, armed with P-51D "Mustangs", were activated on October 24, 1947. From 1947 to 1955, these two squadrons extensively conducted pacification campaigns against the Huks in Central Luzon and the forces of Kamlon in Southern Mindanao.

The increasing awareness of the important role of air defense and the gradual expansion of the base led to the activation of other support units. Some of the units activated during the early days were the Basic Flying School Squadron and the Advance Flying School Squadron, which were later transferred to Fernando Air Base.

On August 1, 1951, the 8th Fighter Squadron was activated to complete the tactical set-up of three fighter squadrons that comprises the 5th Fighter Group. On January 15, 1949, the 5th Fighter Group Headquarters was re-designated as Basa Air Base Headquarters.

Pursuant to General Orders No. 381, GHQ, AFP, dated September 30, 1952, and HPAF, dated October 7, 1952, Basa Air Base Headquarters was finally re-designated as the 5th Fighter Wing Headquarters. After being reorganized into an Air Wing set-up, the position of the Base Commander has been changed, since then, to Wing Commander.

Basa Air Base was closed in 1955 to pave the way for the gradual transition to jet aircraft operations, which was a move towards modernization and expansion. It was then developed into a modern fighter base complex, equipped with a sprawling multi-million peso jet runway, aircraft movement areas, lighting and refueling facilities, workshops, and other vital installations for the 5th Fighter Wing jet operations. On December 14, 1962, the 5th Fighter Wing formed the 9th Tactical Fighter Squadron ("Limbas") as the PAF contingent to the United Nations Operation in the Congo, Congo, Africa.

By 1994, with the acquisition of the SIAI-Marchetti S.211 (S-211) jet, the 7th Tactical Fighter Squadron was crewed and reorganized. The aircraft mainstay then on was the warrior version of the S-211 also known as the AS-211 fitted with hard points and weapons systems.

As of 2009, Basa Air Base housed the Air Defense Wing headquarters, the 5th Fighter Group (also referred to as the 5th Tactical Fighter Group), and the 355th Aviation Engineering Wing, along with the 1302nd Dental Dispensary. The Armed Forces of the Philippines Modernization Plan called for the procurement of a fighter aircraft replacement by 2012, which would likely be based at Basa Air Base.

Since 2016, the USAF again makes partial use of the base with an unknown number of American personnel being stationed there. This measure was agreed as part of the Enhanced Defense Cooperation Agreement (EDCA) negotiated 2014/5.

=== Mount Pinatubo eruption ===
Basa Air Base suffered heavy infrastructural damage when Mount Pinatubo, less than 15 miles (24 km) away, erupted in 1991. This left most buildings buried in thick layers of ash. Many of the PAF's grounded F-8 Crusader jet fighters were damaged, and residents were evacuated to other Philippine military facilities, such as Camp Olivas in San Fernando, Pampanga and Villamor Air Base in Pasay.

=== Recent history ===
In March 2016, the United States and the Philippines concluded their Sixth Annual Bilateral Security Dialogue session in Washington, D.C. At that forum, one of the first fruits of the Enhanced Defense Cooperation Agreement (EDCA) came to bear: the announcement of five Philippine-controlled bases where the United States could rotate troops and pre-position facilities and materials in support of the U.S. Pacific Pivot. One of those installations was Basa Air Base, which has plenty of room for potential U.S. Air Force operations by fighter and bomber elements of the U.S. Air Force, specifically the Pacific Air Forces and the Air Combat Command.

Under the Enhanced Defense Cooperation Agreement (EDCA), the United States and the Philippines started the rehabilitation of the air base's runway in March 2023. It was completed in November 2023, making the runway ready to accommodate larger and heavier aircraft. It was the largest EDCA project to date which costs PHP 1.3 billion. The project consisted of scraping of existing asphalt and re-asphalting and repairing of runway overruns.

== Facilities and equipment ==
=== Facilities ===
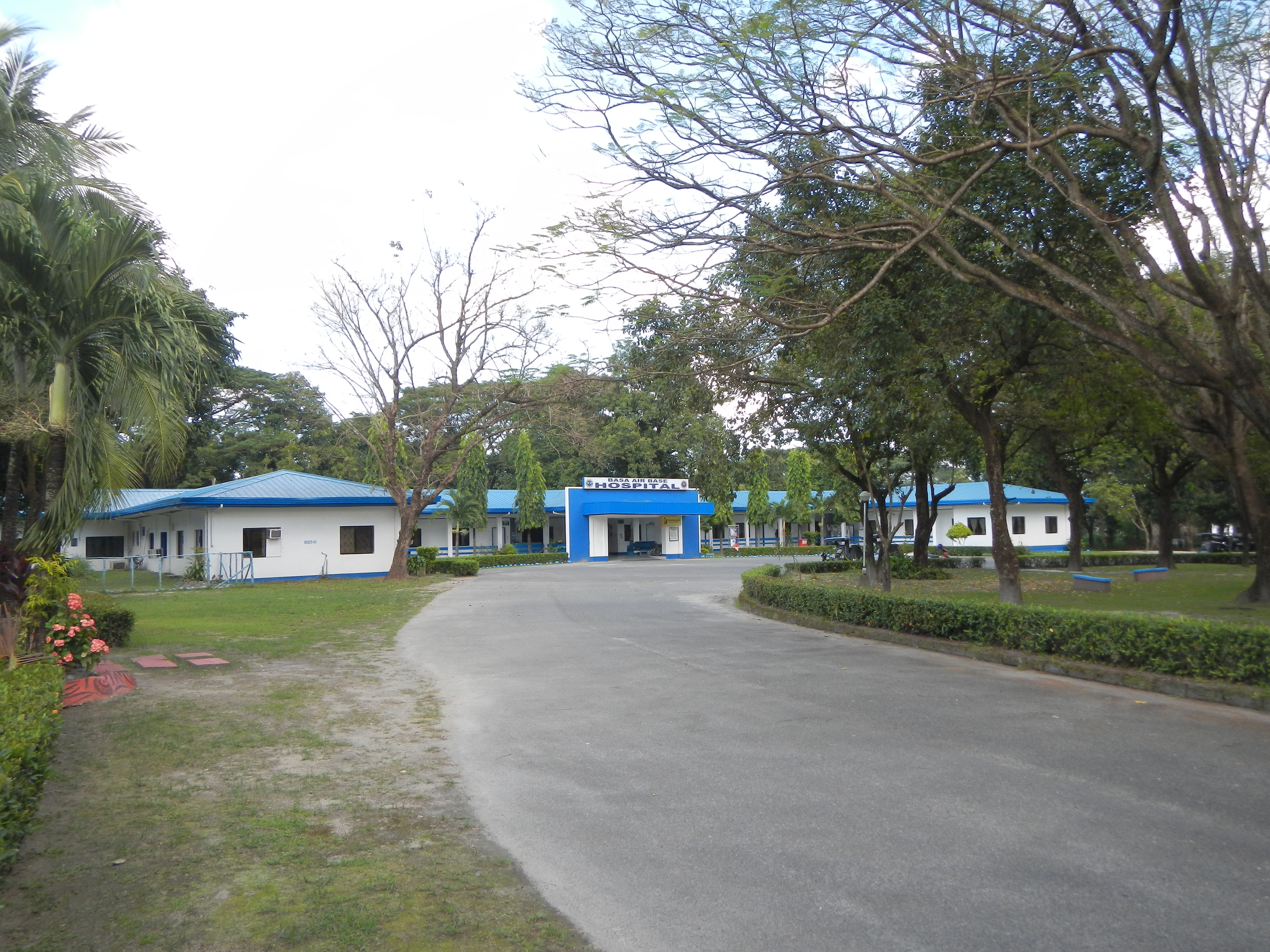
Hospital

The air base hosts the Basa Air Base Hospital is one of the primary medical facilities of the Philippine Air Force. It also has a ground base flight simulator for pilots training to use the FA-50PH light fighter jet.

It also hosts a chapel, known as the Our Lady of Loretto Chapel, which was founded in 1949 with St. Michael the Archangel as patron. Originally located at the flight line, it was transferred to its present location in 1956. It was renovated in 1984 after sustaining heavy damage from a 1983 typhoon. It was rededicated to Our Lady of Loretto, and used as an evacuation center for the Mt. Pinatubo eruption victims in 1991. It was inaugurated on the 55th Founding Anniversary on August 22, 2002.

=== Aircraft ===
- North American P-51 Mustang (1947–1960)
- North American F-86F Sabre (1957–1980)
- Lockheed T-33 Shooting Star (1950–1990)
- Vought F-8 Crusader (1977–1988)
- Northrop F-5 Freedom Fighter (1964–2005)
- SIAI-Marchetti S.211 (1990–present)
- FA-50PH Fighting Eagle (2017–present)

== Aerobatic Teams ==
In 1953, the elite Blue Diamonds Aerobatics Team was formed from the core of the 6th Tactical Fighter Squadron. Showcasing the Philippine Air Force pilot's skill and proficiency in flying, the team quickly gained nationwide recognition.

In 1971, two other aerobatics teams: the 9th Tactical Fighter Squadron's Golden Sabres, led by Lt Col Antonio M Bautista and the 7th Tactical Fighter Squadron's Red Aces, were formed. In 1974, both teams retired due to economic setbacks brought by the increase in oil prices, inflation, and the Philippine Air Force's heavy losses in its Mindanao campaigns.

== Accidents and incidents ==
- On 15 April 1971, Douglas C-47A 293246 of the Philippine Air Force crashed shortly after take-off following the failure of the starboard engine. All 40 people on board were killed. The aircraft was operating on a military flight to Manila Airport. The accident was the 2nd worst involving the DC-3 at the time, and is the 3rd worst as of 2010.
