= 2023 Welcome Rotonda road rage incident =

Road rage incident in Quezon City, Metro Manila

- A still from the viral video showing Wilfredo Gonzales (right) cocking his gun
- Location: Doña Josefa, Quezon City, Philippines
- Date: August 8, 2023; Around 6:00 pm (PHT (UTC+08:00))
- Attack type: Gun-toting, grave threat, reckless driving
- Weapon: Glock 17 semi-automatic pistol
- Victim: Allan Bandiola
- Perpetrator: Wilfredo Gonzales
- Motive: Road rage
- Verdict: Driver's license revoked with two-year suspension

On the late afternoon of August 8, 2023, a road rage incident occurred when former Philippine National Police (PNP) officer Wilfredo Gonzales, driving a red Kia Rio, cut off Allan Bandiola, who was riding his bicycle in the bicycle lane near Welcome Rotonda in Doña Josefa, Quezon City, Philippines. Following the altercation, Gonzales exited his car, threatened to shoot the cyclist with a handgun, and slapped him on the head. On the same day, a settlement was reached between both parties, with Bandiola paying ₱500 to Gonzales for damages to his car.

However, footage of the incident went viral online on August 26 resulting in public outcry, prompting Gonzales to surrender to the PNP the next day. Gonzales' permit to carry firearms and his firearms license and registration were revoked as a result of the incident. A total of four registered firearms, including the one used in the incident, were confiscated by the PNP. The driver has also been issued a show-cause order by the Land Transportation Office (LTO) and faces four traffic violations of disregarding traffic signs, obstruction to traffic, operating a vehicle to commit a crime, and reckless driving.

An ongoing investigation is being conducted by the Quezon City government and the PNP to determine if the case was mishandled. Gonzales was scheduled to appear before the LTO on August 31 for the four traffic violations he is being charged with in relation to the incident but did not show up. As a result, the LTO has revoked his driver's license and suspended him from re-applying for a license for two years. The Philippine Senate Committee on Public Order and Dangerous Drugs also held a hearing on the issue on September 5 with both Gonzales and the cyclist in attendance.

== Incident ==
On August 8, 2023, around 6:00 PM PHT (UTC+08:00), a male riding a bicycle on the bicycle lane near Welcome Rotonda at the intersection of Quezon Avenue and Kitanlad Street was cut off by a red Kia Rio, causing the bicycle to hit the car. The cyclist then tapped the car thrice to alert the driver that he was nearly sideswiped, with the bicycle handlebar accidentally scraping the vehicle in the process. Following this, the sedan driver exited the car and threatened the cyclist by cocking and aiming a handgun at him and slapping him on the head. Initial footage of the incident was recorded by nearby closed-circuit television (CCTV) cameras.

According to the driver, the cyclist had allegedly left the scene and the driver "pursued" the cyclist to bring him over to the police. Both parties were initially brought to Kamuning Police Station (Station 10) of the Quezon City Police District (QCPD) in Kamuning before being transferred to the Galas Police Station (Station 11) in San Isidro Galas. The cyclist had pleaded with the police to check CCTV footage for proof that the driver had pulled a gun on him, but were allegedly ignored due to distractions by other traffic accidents reported to the police station. At the station, the driver surrendered his gun and both parties had allegedly reached a settlement.

== Investigation ==
Clearer footage of the incident recorded by the passenger of a passing car went viral online several weeks later on August 26, allowing the vehicle plate number to be identified and showing the driver threatening the cyclist. A show-case order was issued by the Land Transportation Office (LTO) on August 27 against the sedan driver, to appear before the LTO on August 31. and a statement was also given by Quezon City mayor Joy Belmonte condemning the incident and ordering the QCPD to conduct an investigation.

=== Surrender ===
As a result of public outcry, the sedan driver surrendered to the QCPD at their headquarters in Camp Karingal within the day and was identified as Wilfredo "Willie" Gonzales, a 63 year old former officer of the Philippine National Police (PNP) assigned at Anonas Police Station (Station 9) of the QCPD along Anonas Street, Quezon City. Gonzales was previously ordered dismissed by the Office of the Ombudsman along ten others in 2000 for their involvement in a bribery case involving drug trafficking suspects and has since been involved in two administrative cases before being ordered dismissed by then-PNP chief Oscar Albayalde on June 7, 2018. Gonzales was also previously demoted and had gone on retirement in 2016, two years before his dismissal, in which his retirement benefits were canceled.

A press conference was held by QCPD chief PBGen. Nicolas Torre III at Camp Karingal, where Gonzales acknowledged his error for pulling out his firearm but denies pointing it at the cyclist. Gonzales alleged that he and the cyclist had already reached a settlement, as Torre appealed to the public for "compassion" and to "stop crucifying" Gonzales. Responding to public outcry towards the incident, Gonzales had urged the public "to be responsible" in sharing the video footage of himself online, appealing for sympathy and asserting that he himself had brought the cyclist to the police.

After the Department of Justice (DOJ) initially denied public rumors that Gonzales was an employee of the DOJ, the Supreme Court of the Philippines released a statement on August 30 indicating that Gonzales was a "coterminus employee" of the office of Associate Justice Ricardo Rosario and that his employment was terminated on August 27 following the incident.

=== Revokation of gun license ===
On August 28, the PNP stated that the Gonzales' permit to carry firearms and his firearms license and registration have been revoked due to the incident and reminded gun owners to be responsible with the use of their firearms. The 9 mm caliber Glock 17 semi-automatic pistol which he used in the incident alongside three registered 45 caliber firearms were confiscated from Gonzales and turned over to the PNP Firearms and Explosives Office.

=== Revokation of driver's license ===
Following the press conference, the LTO disclosed that Gonzales was not the registered owner of the Kia Rio that he was driving during the incident. As a result, the unidentified registered owner has also been summoned to the LTO for explanation. Gonzales currently faces four traffic violations: obstruction of traffic, operating a vehicle to commit a crime, and reckless driving under Republic Act No. 4136 or the Land Transportation and Traffic Code, and disregarding of traffic signs under Joint Administrative Order 2014-01. The LTO has also recommended to put the Kia Rio under alarm effective immediately, and issued a 90-day preventive suspension on Gonzales' driver's license ahead of his scheduled August 31 appearance before the LTO.

On September 1, the LTO issued a press release stating that Gonzales did not appear during the scheduled August 31 hearing, stating that Gonzales had instead sent his son to surrender his driver's license. The LTO also stated that Gonzales did not submit a notarized affidavit, waiving his right to hear and contradict the allegations against him. As a result, the LTO announced that the agency will decide on his case with only the available evidence.

On September 7, the LTO stated that the driver's license of Gonzales was effectively revoked due to the incident and suspended Gonzales from re-applying for a license for two years. The LTO clarified that a permanent revocation of a driver's license is reserved for incidents that cause death.

=== Investigation of police mishandling ===
On August 28, Mayor Belmonte issued a new statement ordering an investigation on how the QCPD handled the case, stating that she will not allow the case to become "whitewashed". She also appealed to the cyclist to come forward to hold Gonzales accountable, and assured that the city will provide legal assistance and protection. The city government is seeking to charge Gonzales for grave threat, slander by deed, reckless imprudence, physical injuries, and violation of the Comprehensive Firearms and Ammunition Regulation Act. In the meantime, she assured that the city will strengthen the safety of its bicycle lanes and deploy more bike patrols. Interior and Local Government secretary Benjamin Abalos Jr. also vowed that the National Police Commission will monitor the PNP's response and handling of the incident.

On August 29, four QCPD police officers from the Galas Police Station have filed a complaint for alarm and scandal against Gonzales at the Quezon City Office of the Prosecutor. The QCPD has asserted that its officers "acted professionally" and denied allegations that its officers had coerced both parties into a settlement.

On August 30, Torre issued a public apology and stepped down from his position as QCPD chief to give way to the investigation and in response to online criticism aimed at the QCPD for giving "VIP treatment" to Gonzales.

On September 5, six QCPD officers consisting of three officers at the Galas Police Station and three officers from the QCPD District Traffic Enforcement Unit were relieved of duty and reassigned to give way to the ongoing police investigation.

=== Legal assistance ===
Raymond Fortun, a lawyer and fellow cyclist who helped raise awareness for the cyclist's situation, offered to provide legal assistance. Fortun stated that in the settlement, the cyclist, who wished to remain anonymous at the time, was forced to admit fault and pay ₱500 to Gonzales for damages to his car. He also mentioned that the cyclist was afraid to continue pursuing the case in fear of his life, and that the individuals who uploaded footage of the incident online had taken them down after being verbally threatened by Gonzales.

=== Senate response and hearing ===
On September 5, Senate president Migz Zubiri and Senator Pia Cayetano filed Senate Resolution No. 763, seeking to investigate the incident. The resolution also draws importance to drafting legislation to promote the responsibility of road sharing, protect road users from road rage, and the need for physical barriers on bicycle lanes to protect cyclists. Senator JV Ejercito also sought an inquiry into the road rage incident through Senate Resolution No. 764,while Senator Jinggoy Estrada delivered a privilege speech on the incident, calling Gonzales a "danger to the cycling, commuting, or riding public".

A Senate hearing on the issue was held by the Philippine Senate Committee on Public Order and Dangerous Drugs headed by Senator Ronald dela Rosa on September 5, 2023, where both Gonzales and the cyclist, who was publicly identified as Allan Bandiola, were in attendance. Bandiola had repeatedly declined requests for interviews and initially declined to appear before the Senate out of fear for his safety. He also reiterated that he was not forced by anyone to enter into a settlement with Gonzales.

During the hearing, Gonzales accused Bandiola of punching the roof of his car with gloves that contained plastic knuckles. This was refuted by Senator Ejercito who pointed out that Bandiola was not wearing any gloves in the video footage. Both he and Dela Rosa also stated that the kind of gloves Gonzales was referring to are not used by cyclists and are commonly used by motorcycle riders, being a rider himself. Dela Rosa agreed with Ejercito, and warned Gonzales not to lie to the Senate committee.

It was revealed during the hearing that Gonzales was also the subject of 10 police complaints, one of which included a neighborhood complaint accusing him of assault. As a result, the Senate questioned how Gonzales was given a gun license in the first place, with Dela Rosa stating that Gonzales should have been charged for grave threats and frustrated homicide instead of the lighter offense of alarm and scandal.

== See also ==
- Gun law in the Philippines
- Law enforcement in the Philippines
- Cycling in the Philippines
- Transportation in Metro Manila
- Traffic in Metro Manila
