= Richard Albano =

Filipino police general (born 1960)

Retired Chief Superintendent Engr. Richard Albano
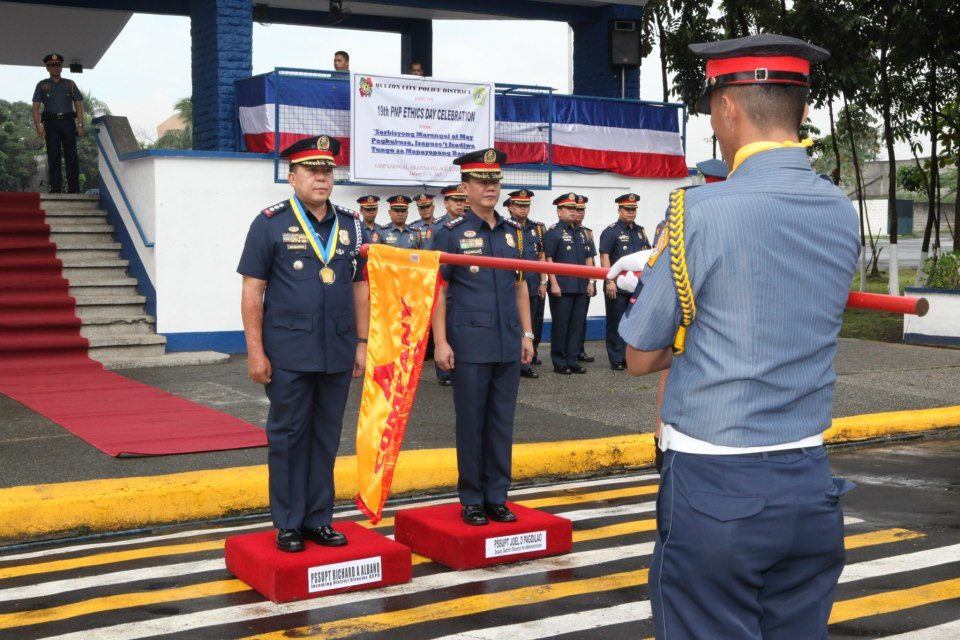
- Albano (left) accorded arrival honors by QCPD Personnel

Director of the Quezon City Police District
- In office 2013–2014
- Preceded by: P/CSUPT Mario dela Vega
- Succeeded by: P/SSUPT Joel Pagdilao

Personal details
- Born: Richard Albano Albano; April 13, 1960 (age 66) Laoag, Ilocos Norte, Philippines
- Education: Philippine Military Academy
- Police career
- Service: Philippine National Police
- Allegiance: Philippines
- Divisions: Police Regional Office 4-A; Quezon City Police District; NHQ Directorate for Logistics; Police Regional Office 3; Police Retirement and Benefits Service; Police Regional Offices 2; Police Regional Office 1; Police Regional Office Cordillera; Northern Police District; Western Police District; Bulacan Provincial Command
- Service years: 1984–2016
- Rank: Police Chief superintendent

Engr. Richard Albano Albano (born April 13, 1960) is a retired Filipino general who is the author of Oplan Lambat-Sibat, a nationwide anti-crime program. Since the launch of this program, Albano was lauded by the national government for the number of successful arrests during his stints at the Quezon City Police District and Police Regional Office 4-A.

He is one of the youngest police officers to be conferred the Star Rank in the Philippines, and was conferred the Cavalier Award in 2014 by the Philippine Military Academy (PMA) for his exemplary performance in the field of police operations. The Cavalier Award is the most coveted and highest honour that can be given to a PMA alumnus.

Albano is popular among the press because of his practical, thoughtful, and swift police investigation and operations management earning him the nickname, "Friend of the Press."

== Early life and education ==
Richard, also called "Bobot" by his teenage peers, was born and raised in Laoag, Ilocos Norte. He is the fourth child of Col. Fulgencio Albano, a retired Philippine Constabulary Officer and a war veteran, and Liwliwa Albano (b. 1925), a public school teacher. His maternal grandfather is Vicente Albano from Messina, Italy, who moved to the Philippines during the Spanish colonization period. Vicente was the first mayor ("president") of Vintar, Ilocos Norte.

Richard has four siblings

- Gen. Rowland: a retired police general and the former vice mayor of Vintar, Ilocos Norte
- Marywin: a registered nurse
- Dr. Maribel: an obstetrician and now a municipal councilor of Vintar, Ilocos Norte.
- Wilfred (+)

The long-running Albano political clan from Isabela is also connected with the Albanos from Ilocos Norte.

Richard graduated in 1980 with a civil engineering degree from the University of Santo Tomas before he entered the Philippine Military Academy under the Maharlika Class of 1984.

== Police career ==
Albano retired from the Philippine National Police after 32 years of active service. The following are his former designations:

- Regional Director: Police Regional Office 4-A
- District Director: Quezon City Police District
- Executive Officer: Directorate for Logistics
- Deputy Director, Chief of Staff: Police Retirement and Benefits Service
- Regional Chief: Criminal Investigation and Detection Group (Police Regional Offices 2 & 3)
- Chief: Regional Comptrollership Division (Police Regional Office 3)
- Chief: Finance Service (Police Regional Office 1)
- Chief: Regional Intelligence and Investigation Division (Police Regional Office Cordillera)
- Chief: District Intelligence Division (Northern Police District)
- Chief: District Special Project Unit (Quezon City Police District)
- Regional Chief: NCR Narcotics Group which later became the Philippine Drug Enforcement Agency (Police Regional Office 1)
- Chief: Criminal Investigation and Detection Unit (Western Police District)
- Chief of Police: Police Regional Office 3
- Intelligence Officer: Police Regional Office 3
- Investigation Officer: Police Regional Office 3

== Professional awards ==
Albano has received a total of 342 professional awards while on active service.

- Anak ng Cabanatuan Award: Awarded by the City Government of Cabanatuan, 2014

== Other recent awards and citations ==
Awards below are from 2013 - 2016:

- Best Police District in the Public Perception Survey: given during the 23rd PNP Founding Anniversary at NCRPO, 2014. Recognition was awarded after NAPOLCOM NCR conducted a public survey pertaining to police perception. Initiated by NAPOLCOM, for the first time, citizens got involved in choosing the best district based on the following criteria: (1) Public Acceptance and Respect; (2) Police Response and Accessibility; (3) Lifestyle, Moral and Ethics; (4) Public Reporting of Crime; (5) Perceived Level of Public Safety
- Medal of Recognition: awarded by Gen. Gregorio Pio Catapag, AFP Chief of Staff, for the success of police security operations during President Benigno S. Aquino III's State of the Nation Address for two (2) consecutive years: 2013 and 2014.
- Achievement Award in the Campaign against Organized Crimes

== Personal life ==
Richard is married to Lucita San Juan-Albano, a medical doctor from Cabanatuan with whom they have five children: Raizel Pauline (b. 1989), Radrich Paul (b. 1994), Richmarc Pierce (b. 1996), Richnell Peter (b. 1999), and Renrich Patrick Allan (b. 2002). In July 2024, Raizel Pauline won the UNESCO's 2024 Global Awards for World Heritage Education Innovative Cases in New Delhi, India. Her "Anthro on Foot" features 44 audio walking tours of the country's 44 cities and municipalities covering 17 regions.
