= Tomas Karingal =

Filipino retired military officre and former police general (1915–1984)

Tomas Boniceli Karingal
- Born: December 30, 1915; Pasacao, Camarines Sur, Philippine Islands
- Died: May 24, 1984 (aged 68); Quezon City, Philippines
- Burial place: Libingan ng mga Bayani
- Military career
- Branch: Philippine Army; Philippine Constabulary
- Service years: 1933–1984
- Rank: Major General (posthumous); Brigadier General (official, before assassination)
- Nickname: Tom
- Conflicts: World War II; Hukbalahap campaign Hadji Kamlon rebellion New People's Army rebellion
- Awards: Armed Forces of the Philippines Medal of Valor

Tomas Boniceli Karingal (December 30, 1915 – May 24, 1984) was a Filipino soldier, war hero and police general who became one of the leading commanders of the Philippine Constabulary (PC) in Metro Manila and Chief of the Quezon City Police Department during the martial law regime of President Ferdinand Marcos. He was assassinated in 1984 by the Alex Boncayao Brigade, then the urban-assassination unit of the communist New People's Army.

== Early life and career ==
Karingal was born on December 30, 1915 in Pasacao, Camarines Sur. In 1933, he joined the Philippine Constabulary as a regular patrolman. When the Philippine Military Academy was established in Baguio in 1936, Karingal signed up to become part of its pioneer batch but flunked out after only a year. Nevertheless, he remained in the PC and was posted in the Ilocos and Nueva Ecija while engaging in counter-intelligence and other covert operations. In recognition for his work, he was commissioned as a reserve third lieutenant in 1940, only a few months after his classmates' graduation.

== Wartime service ==
After the Japanese occupation of Manila in 1942 during World War II, Karingal stayed behind enemy lines to engage in espionage and sabotage missions for the Allies as part of President Quezon's Own Guerrillas. He later returned to his native Bicol and joined a guerrilla unit there until the end of the war.

== Postwar career ==
After the war, Karingal was sent to the United States for advanced training, spending three months at the Provost Marshal School in Fort Sam Houston in San Antonio, Texas. Upon his return, he formally rejoined the PC and was commissioned as a regular officer in 1948. He was then assigned to Bicol until 1953, combating the Hukbalahap Rebellion while engaging in covert operations. There, he was cited for the elimination of a local Huk commander and Partido Komunista ng Pilipinas leader Mariano Balgos. In 1954, he was sent to Mindanao to help quell a revolt led by Hadji Kamlon in Sulu as part of Task Force Jolo, where he served as its intelligence chief, learning the Tausug language in the process and contributing to Kamlon's capture.

After the revolt, Karingal continued to rise in the PC, becoming chief of police of Quezon City from 1960 to 1963. He then became provincial PC commander of Iloilo and later Batangas before being assigned as commanding officer of the Law Enforcement Command of the Bureau of Customs Police. He returned as Quezon City Police Chief in 1965 and served there until 1967.

== Martial law ==
In 1967, President Ferdinand Marcos appointed Karingal to head the Philippine Constabulary Metropolitan Command's Northern Police District, which included Quezon City. In 1970, he led the PC in suppressing the Diliman Commune, during which he raided dormitories of the University of the Philippines Diliman without permission. He also led the suppression of other antigovernment demonstrations during the First Quarter Storm in his area.

After Marcos declared martial law in 1972, Karingal became known as one of the most feared military commanders of the dictatorship, gaining a reputation for violently suppressing antigovernment demonstrations. Upon Corazon Aquino's return to the Philippines following the assassination of her husband, Senator Ninoy Aquino in 1983, Karingal received her at the Manila International Airport but was asked by her brother, Peping Cojuangco to leave after she became upset upon seeing him and his uniformed men. He advised them however that he would send plainclothes officers to her home in Quezon City. In January 1984, he deployed riot squads armed with automatic rifles, gas guns and batons to crush a protest march against the Aquino assassination. In April that year, he also commanded troops who opened fire on striking workers at a rubber factory, killing two.

== Assassination ==
On May 24, 1984, Karingal, by then a brigadier general, was shot and killed by two gunmen while dining with fellow police officers at the Fisher's Reef Restaurant along Scout Borromeo Street in Barangay South Triangle, Quezon City. He was buried at the Libingan ng mga Bayani on May 31 in a televised ceremony attended by Armed Forces of the Philippines Chief of Staff Fabian Ver, President Marcos, who posthumously promoted him to Major General and awarded him three medals, and First Lady Imelda Marcos.

The Alex Boncayao Brigade, then the urban hit squad of the communist New People's Army, claimed responsibility for Karingal's assassination. In a letter, it called Karingal a "die-hard fascist" who was personally responsible for numerous acts of repression during the dictatorship. It also hinted at military involvement in the killing, expressing its thanks to AFP personnel for "assisting" them in the murder.

Historian Alfred W. McCoy, in his study on the Philippine military, credits Karingal's death as a crucial moment in the history of the Philippines during the 1980s, writing that had he lived longer and stayed at his post, he would have unhesitatingly crushed the demonstrators who had gathered to demand Marcos’ overthrow during the People Power Revolution in 1986.

== Legacy ==
The headquarters of the Quezon City Police District, located in Barangay Sikatuna Village, was renamed in his honor.

Karingal was also the subject of the 1990 Filipino action biopic "Ako ang Batas" -Gen. Tomas Karingal, directed by Francis "Jun" Posadas, produced by Seiko Films and with Eddie Garcia portraying him.
