= Shamah Bulangis =

Filipina human rights activist

Shamah Silvosa Bulangis is a Filipina activist. She has advocated for LGBTQ rights in the Philippines. She spoke in favor of using education as a means to combat homophobia and transphobia. She was against the drug war started by Rodrigo Duterte; she organized protests and visited the United States to advocate for its end.

== Personal life ==
Bulangis was raised in a conservative, religious family who preached about the immorality of being gay. She studied the Bible so she could challenge their beliefs. She was a member of the Akbayan Citizens' Action Party as of 2016. She considers herself a social democrat.

== Activism ==
In 2018, Bulangis spoke at a filipino restaurant in Washington, D.C. to advocate for the passage of the Philippines Human Rights Accountability and Counternarcotics Act of 2017. She criticized the then-ongoing drug war in the Philippines initiated by president Duterte. She described the drug war as a "policy to kill". She attended a funeral march for Kian Delos Santos as a member of YouthResist, protesting Duterte's drug war. She organized a protest in Edsa condemning the drug war and Delos Santos's death. She was one of several activists to call for Secretary of Justice Vitaliano Aguirre II to be removed from office for spreading false information.

She has said that she believes ignorance creates institutionalized homophobia and transphobia and the violence stemming from it. She has advocated for education as a solution. Bulangis founded the Visayas LBQ Network to provide LBQ women their own space, while acknowledging the work of organizations led by gay men. She used the organization and other connections to provide relief to her hometown following Typhoon Odette in 2021. She said that the efforts challenged her grandmother's fear of the LGBTQ community when the trans community was "the first [one] to show up and help".

Bulangis has advocated for the opinions of young people to be considered when attempting to create a culturally relevant education, where older generations pass down intangible elements of cultural heritage.
