= "Ako ang Batas" -Gen. Tomas Karingal =

1990 action film by Francis "Jun" Posadas

- Directed by: Francis "Jun" Posadas
- Screenplay by: Tony Mortel; Diego Cagahastian
- Produced by: Robbie Tan; Eddie Garcia
- Starring: Eddie Garcia
- Cinematography: Ver Dauz
- Edited by: Rene Tala
- Music by: Benny Medina
- Production companies: Seiko Films; EG Productions
- Distributed by: Seiko Films
- Release date: March 27, 1990
- Running time: 112 minutes
- Country: Philippines
- Languages: Filipino; English

"Ako ang Batas" -Gen. Tomas Karingal (lit. I am the Law) is a 1990 Philippine biographical action film directed by Francis "Jun" Posadas. The film stars Eddie Garcia in the title role and is based on the life of Gen. Tomas Karingal. The movie depicts Karingal during World War II serving as the chief of the Quezon City Police District.

The film was producer Robbie Tan's entry to the 1990 Metro Manila Film Festival.

== Cast ==
- Eddie Garcia as Brigadier Gen. Tomas B. Karingal PC-INP
  - John Regala as Young 1stLt./Major/Lt.Col Tomas B. Karingal
- Cesar Montano as Lt. Reyes
- Marita Zobel as Mrs. Karingal
- Michael Locsin
- Jobelle Salvador
- Maita Soriano as Soledad
- Jovit Moya as Young Nanding Alvarez
- Orestes Ojeda
- Tony Angeles
- Ria Arcache as Mam
- Robert Arevalo as Assemblyman
- Janet Arnaiz as Baby
- Jun King Austria
- Turko Cervantes
- Ernie David as Japanese Officer
- Renato del Prado
- Ernie Forte
- Big Boy Gomez
- Usman Hassim
- Subas Herrero as Nanding Alvarez
- Precious Hipolito
- Edward Luna
