= Hong Tai raid =

Raid by the Philippine National Police

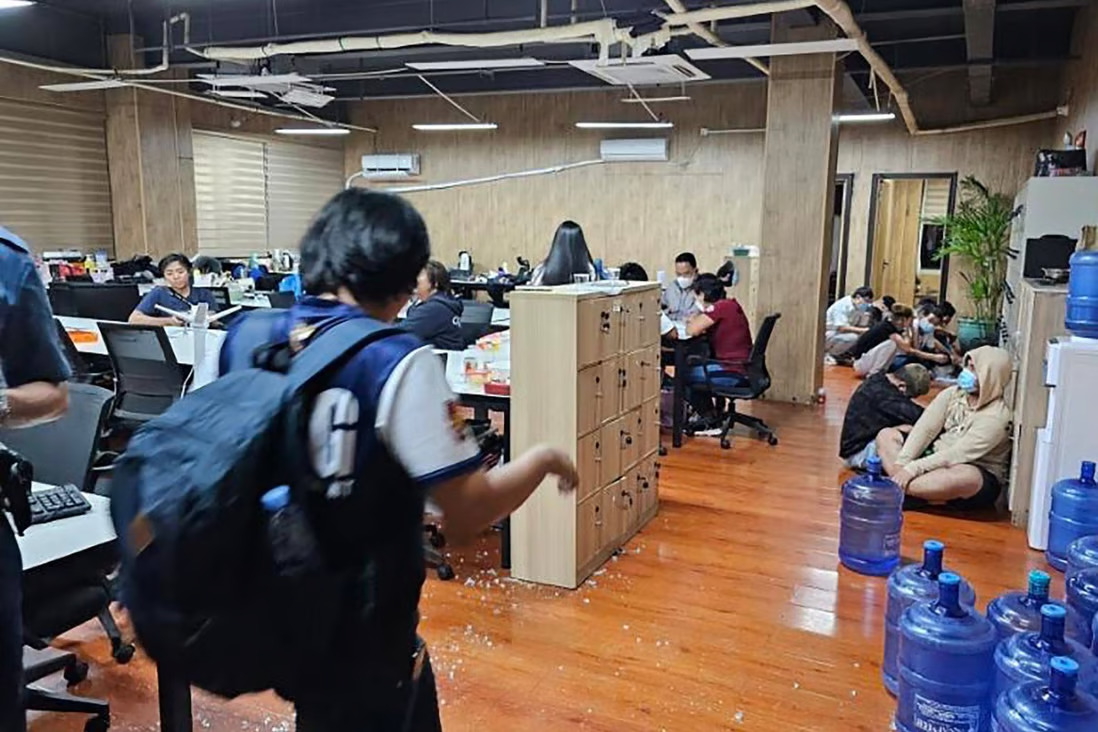
- Police personnel (left) at work inside a building at Xinchuang.
- Date: June 27, 2023
- Venue: Hong Tai compound
- Location: Brgy. Almanza Uno, Las Piñas, Metro Manila; 14°25′53.9″N 121°01′05.0″E
- Type: Law enforcement operation
- Theme: Anti-human trafficking
- Target: Xinchuang Network Technology
- Participants: Philippine National Police: National Capital Region Police Office; Anti-Cybercrime Group
- Rescued: 2,812

On June 27, 2023, the Philippine National Police conducted a raid on a gambling complex in Las Piñas, Metro Manila, Philippines to serve warrants related to anti-human trafficking laws. The Department of Justice has alleged that the police had not coordinated with it prior to the raid.

== Background ==
=== Raid site ===
The police raid occurred at a barbed wired blue walled complex of seven buildings linked to Xinchuang Network Technology. The compound situated along Alabang-Zapote Road in Barangay Almanza Uno in Las Piñas, Metro Manila is colloquially known as "Hong Tai".

Xinchuang is a Philippine Offshore Gaming Operator (POGO). It was accredited by the Philippine Amusement and Gaming Corporation (PAGCOR).

== Events ==
=== Raid ===
Rescued people from the Hong Tai raid
Country	Number of people
Philippines	1,528
China	687
Vietnam	186
Indonesia	140
Malaysia	135
Thailand	83
Taiwan	18
Nigeria	8
Myanmar	8
Singapore	5
Yemen	2
Pakistan	2
Chad	2
Cameroon	1
India	1
Iran	1
Ivory Coast	1
Somalia	1
Sudan	1
Tunisia	1
"Arab" (Note: From an unspecified country)	1

A Joint Police Task Force of the Philippine National Police's (PNP) National Capital Region Police Office led by the Anti-Cybercrime Group (ACG) conducted a raid on Xinchuang's hub in Las Piñas around midnight on June 27, 2023

The NCRPO executed search and seizure warrants for computer data against Xinchuang for alleged violations of the Expanded Anti-Trafficking in Persons Act. The police also purportedly rescued close to 3,000 people, 1,528 of which are Filipinos and the rest being foreign citizens, inside the compound.

Five Chinese nationals were arrested but was later released for further preliminary investigation. Four Chinese and three Taiwanese were found out to be fugitives and turned over to the Bureau of Immigration.

There are 4 names from Indonesia who are being investigated by the Indonesian police. Angga Pratama (BZ) David Syahputra (Asheng) Clara (Florence) Jonaldi (JO) and SUN (name unknown) Bureau of Immigration.

In a letter dated on the same day as the raid, PAGCOR ordered Xinchuang to cease operations.

=== Detention and deportations ===
The Filipinos purportedly rescued by the police at the Hong Tai compound were allowed to go to their homes while foreign citizens were detained inside the compound by the police while their documents are being processed for possible deportation.

A commotion occurred on June 29 after 48 foreign citizens attempted to leave the compound by crossing over walls, leading 13 injuries. The Vargas Law Office, representing Xinchuang, said that three were seriously injured alleged due to police mauling and that one suffered from a gunshot wound. The police denied the accusations and assured that medical treatment was provided to the injured.

On July 3, Xinchuang through its lawyer Ananias Christian Vargas demanded the police to vacate the Hong Tai compound and questioned the legality of law authorities use of the complex as a detention and immigration processing center, demanded reparations for properties destroyed in the raid and return of confiscated materials which he claims not to be part of the search warrant.

== Reactions ==
The Department of Justice under Justice Secretary Crispin Remulla called out the PNP ACG alleging that it failed to coordinate with the Inter-Agency Council Against Trafficking and for going through with the raid despite supposedly lack of evidence. The PNP has disputed the DOJ's claim insisting that proper legal process was observed. Secretary Remulla also states that his department is considering filing "obstruction of justice " charges against the witnesses for refusing to testify after the raid already happened.

Senator Raffy Tulfo echoed the claim that the PNP-ACG did not do proper coordination and alleged that there is "haggling" going on between the police and embassy officials over the release of foreigners under police custody. Tulfo citing an unnamed "reliable source" accused the police of extorting foreigners in exchange for their freedom. Senator Win Gatchalian on the other hand condemned Xinchuang for employing fugitives.
