= Avelino Razon =

Filipino police officer and politician (born 1952)

Presidential Adviser on the Peace Process
- In office 2009–2010
- President: Gloria Macapagal Arroyo

Personal details
- Born: Avelino Ignacio Razon, Jr. September 27, 1952 (age 74) Philippines
- Party: NPC (2010)
- Education: Philippine Military Academy
- Police career
- Service: Philippine National Police
- Allegiance: Philippines
- Divisions: Head, Task Force Usig; PNP Directoral Staff; National Capital Region Police Office; Central Visayas Regional Police Office; Western Police District; PNP Special Action Force; Special Assistant on Security to acting Chief of Staff; Senior Aide-de-camp to then Philippine Constabulary Chief; 224th Company in Laguna; 563rd Philippine Constabulary; National Capital Region Narcotics Field Unit (NARCOM); Special Operations of the Presidential Security Group; Presidential Protection Group
- Service years: 1974–2008
- Rank: Police Director General

Avelino "Sonny" Ignacio Razon Jr. (born September 27, 1952) is a Filipino former police officer and politician who served as Chief of the Philippine National Police.

== Police career ==
Graduate of Philippine Military Academy Marangal class of 1974, Razon was one who rarely served twice as district director of Western Police District (WPD), first from 1996 to 1998, and from 1999 to 2001. He was later re-assigned by then-acting PNP chief Deputy Director General Larry Mendoza in Central Visayas Police (PRO-7) after his WPD stint.

In 2003, he served as Directorate for Human Resource and Doctrine Development (DHRDD), and later as director of the Directorate for Operations in until 2004, when he was appointed as director of National Capital Region Police Office (NCRPO / Metro Manila Police). He served at NCRPO director until 2005, when he was re-assigned at PNP Directorial Staff and promoted to 3-star rank.

He became Chief of the Philippine National Police replacing Oscar Calderon from October 1, 2007, to September 28, 2008. He was replaced by CIDG personnel Jesus Verzosa.

== Political career ==
He also ran for Mayor of Manila in 2010, supported by Asenso Manileño. He faced incumbent mayor and another retired police officer Fred Lim. Lim was running mate of incumbent Vice Mayor Isko Moreno of Asenso, but Razon was adopted as a guest candidate, and preferred candidate by younger voters that time. He eventually lost to Lim.

== Graft case ==
In 2013, Razon was charged with 32 others of graft and ordered by Sandiganbayan to be arrested. The graft case are related to alleged irregular procurement contracts in 2007 and 2008, during his PNP chief term. Sandiganbayan's fourth division rejected Razon’s demurrer in a 272-page resolution released on June 21. The case was dismissed 10 years later due to the evidence being insufficient.

Police appointments
Preceded by PDir.Gen. Oscar Calderon	Chief of the Philippine National Police	Succeeded by PDG. Jesus Versoza
Preceded by PDGen. Oscar C. Calderon	Chief of the Directorial Staff of the Philippine National Police	Succeeded by PDDGen. Jesus Versoza
Preceded by PDir. Ricardo de Leon	Regoional Director of the National Capital Region Police Office	Succeeded by PDir. Vidal Querol
Preceded by PSr.Supt. Efren Fernandez; PSr.Supt. Nicolas Pasinos	Director of Western Police District	Succeeded by S/Supt. Hermogenes Ebdane; S/Supt. Virtus Gil
Preceded by Lt. Col. Reynaldo Velasco	Commander of the Special Action Force	Succeeded by Brig. Gen. Hermogenes Ebdane
