= Murders of Kian delos Santos, Carl Arnaiz, and Reynaldo de Guzman =

Murders of three teenagers in the Philippines by police officers

- Part of the Philippine drug war
- Left to right: Delos Santos, Arnaiz and de Guzman
- Date: August 16–18, 2017
- Type: Delos Santos and Arnaiz: Shooting de Guzman: Stabbing
- Filmed by: CCTV camera owned by Barangay 160, Caloocan (partial footage, delos Santos)
- Participants: Delos Santos: Chief Inspector Amor Cerillo; Police Officer (PO) 3 Arnel Oares; PO1 Jerwin Cruz; PO1 Jeremias Pereda; Arnaiz and de Guzman: PO1 Jefrey Perez; Ricky Arquilita
- Outcome: Protests in Metro Manila in 21 August 2017
- Deaths: Kian Loyd D. delos Santos; Carl Arnaiz; Reynaldo de Guzman
- Charges: Murder; Torture
- Verdict: Guilty (Perez)

Kian delos Santos, Carl Arnaiz and Reynaldo de Guzman were three teenagers who were killed on August 16 to 18, 2017, during the course of the Philippine drug war.

On the evening of August 16, 2017, a 17-year-old Filipino student named Kian Loyd delos Santos was fatally shot by police officers conducting an anti-drug operation in Caloocan, Metro Manila. The case became controversial when the official police reports differed from witness accounts and CCTV footage. It is reported 82 people were killed by police on the night of 16 August.

Two days after the killing of delos Santos, Arnaiz and de Guzman went missing from their Cainta, Rizal, residence. Their bodies were later found with Arnaiz reported to have been shot dead by police while de Guzman was stabbed 30 times and found in a creek in Gapan, Nueva Ecija.

The murders sparked widespread controversy across the Philippines, and has been scrutinized by the International Criminal Court. As of 2023, four implicated officers have been convicted of murder.

== Background ==
=== Philippine drug war ===
In accordance with his campaign promise, President Rodrigo Duterte initiated the war on drugs shortly after he took office on June 30, 2016. As of July 26, 2017, the Philippine Information Agency reported 68,000 anti-drug operations which resulted in around 97,000 arrests, 1.3 million surrenders, and around 3,500 drug personalities killed in legitimate police operations. Thousands of others have been killed by vigilantes, which the police have categorized as "deaths under investigation." The night of August 14–15, just prior to Delos Santos's death, was the "bloodiest night" in the Philippine drug war, where dozens of police operations resulted in 32 drug suspects killed and more than 100 arrested in the province of Bulacan.

== Murders ==
=== Kian Loyd delos Santos ===
Kian Loyd delos Santos
- Born: Kian Loyd Dogillo delos Santos; May 26, 2000
- Died: August 16, 2017 (aged 17); Barangay 160, Caloocan, Metro Manila, Philippines
- Cause of death: Gunshot wound to the head
- Resting place: La Loma Cemetery, Caloocan
- Education: Our Lady of Lourdes College, Valenzuela
- Occupation: Senior high school student

Kian Loyd Dogillo delos Santos (May 26, 2000 – August 16, 2017) was 17 years old at the time of his death and was a resident of Barangay 160, Caloocan. Delos Santos was the third of four siblings. His mother, Lorenza, worked as a domestic helper in Riyadh, Saudi Arabia, while his father, Saldy, (Note: Spelled "Zaldy" in some sources.) operated a sari-sari store that Kian minded from 5:30 a.m. to 12:00 noon every day before he went to school. After closing the store at night, he would usually walk around the block for some small talk with neighborhood friends. At the time of his death, he was a grade 11 (senior high school) student at Our Lady of Lourdes College in Valenzuela. His high school principal stated that Delos Santos was never summoned to his office for any delinquency or misconduct. According to a classmate and close friend of his, Delos Santos wanted to become a cadet of the Philippine National Police Academy. Delos Santos was also in favor of the government's war on drugs, according to another classmate.

Both Senior Superintendent Chito Bersaluna, the police chief of Caloocan, and Chief Inspector Amor Cerillo, the commander of the local Police Community Precinct, have separately admitted that Delos Santos was not on their police watch list. However, they believed that he was a drug runner and drug user "based on a statement of another arrested drug suspect." The officials of Barangay 160, Caloocan also confirmed that Delos Santos was not on their drugs watch list.

On August 26, 2017, a Catholic funeral Mass for Delos Santos was held at 8 a.m. PST, at a parish in Santa Quiteria, Caloocan; it was attended by his family and friends, and hundreds of other people, including human rights advocates. At around 2 p.m., Delos Santos was interred at La Loma Cemetery.

==== Incident ====
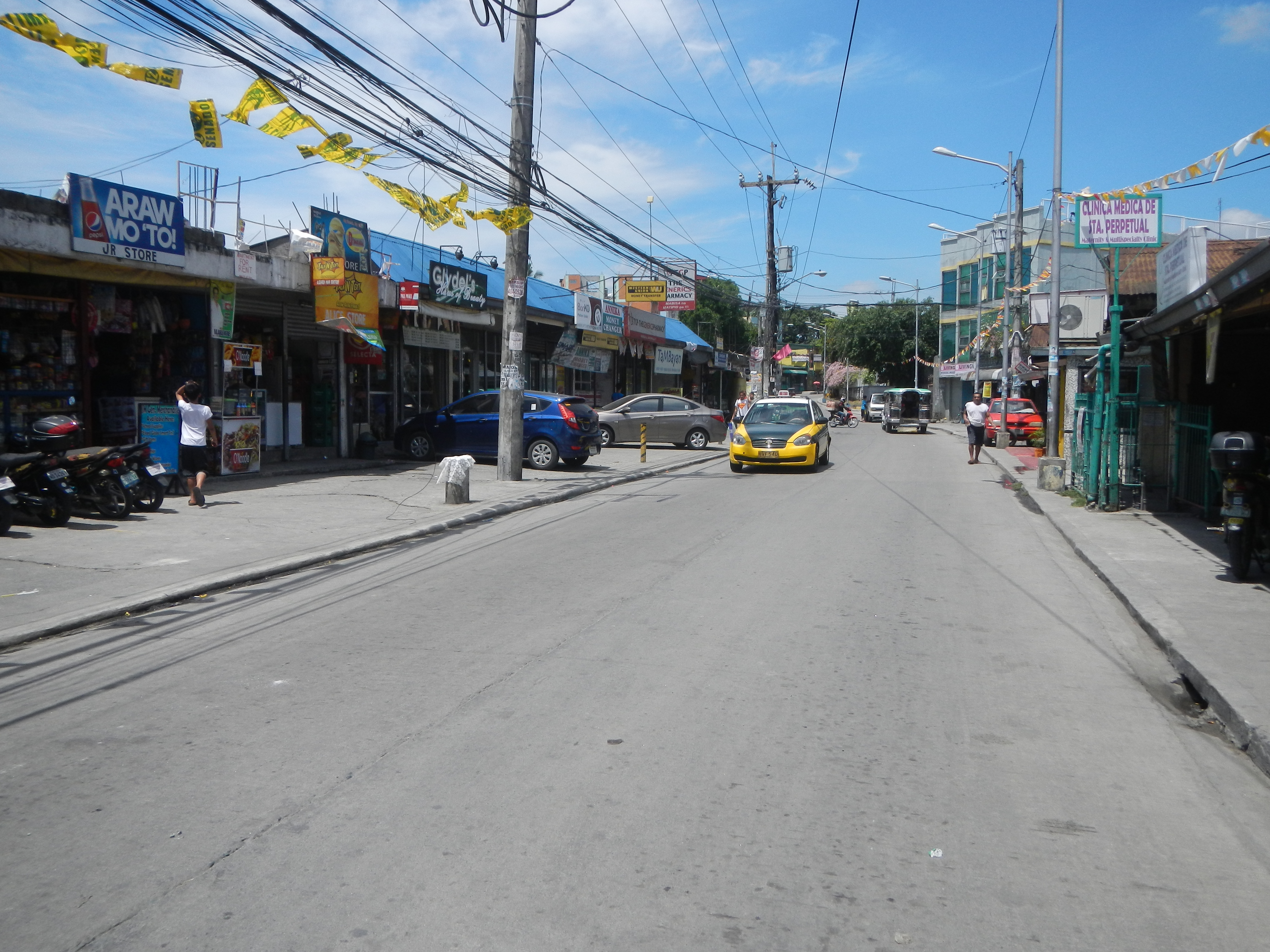
Barangay 160, Caloocan (in 2016), where the victim lived

At around 8:00 p.m. PST on August 16, 2017, officers of the Philippine National Police (PNP) led by PO3 Arnel Oares, were conducting a "one-time, big-time" anti-illegal drugs operation in Barangay 160, Caloocan where Delos Santos lived. During the anti-drug operation, Delos Santos went missing for almost an hour, which prompted his family to look for him at the nearest police station but failed to find him there. Several gunshots were then heard.

At 8:57 p.m., C/Insp. Amor Cerillo and another police officer, both in plainclothes, arrived at the hall of Barangay 160 to report a supposed shootout. In a muddy and dark alley near his house, which was the site of the alleged encounter, Delos Santos was found in fetal position with gunshot wounds to his head. Recovered from his corpse were a .45-caliber pistol, four cartridges, and two sachets of suspected methamphetamine.

==== Police report ====
According to the official police report, at around 8:45 p.m., Delos Santos tried to flee when he noticed the police officers approaching him. He then drew his gun and "directly shot" towards the police, which prompted PO3 Arnel Oares to fire back in self-defense, killing Delos Santos. The pistol, cartridges, and two sachets of methamphetamine were then found in Delos Santos's possession.

According to Cerillo and Bersaluna, a drug dealer that they earlier arrested claimed that Delos Santos was the mule of "Neneng" Escopino, a local drug dealer on the police watch list.

==== Witness accounts and CCTV footage ====
Witnesses claim that Delos Santos was just loitering near his house at around 8:00 p.m., when two unidentified men grabbed him and led him away. The barangay's CCTV footage of the incident shows that at 8:24 p.m., a young man believed to be Delos Santos was being dragged by two men in plainclothes towards the area where his corpse would be later found. The video also showed a third man that headed towards the same direction.

Cerillo confirmed that the two men in the video were plainclothes police officers. He also clarified that the person being dragged was not Delos Santos, but rather a police asset. Bersaluna and Cirillo also clarified that police officers are not required to wear their uniforms during anti-illegal drugs operations.

Two witnesses who approached Dominic Almelor of ABS-CBN News claimed that Delos Santos was blindfolded by the two men and forced to hold a gun, fire it, and run. Another witness who approached Saleema Refran of GMA News claimed that Delos Santos begged for his life before getting shot. Afterwards, the shooters asked the witness if he knew the victim, which he denied. The witness later confirmed that the men who were filmed inside the barangay hall reporting the alleged shootout were the same men who shot Delos Santos.

A 13-year-old witness interviewed by The Manila Bulletin claimed that she saw Delos Santos being punched and slapped by four armed plainclothes officers before he was dragged away.

Delos Santos's uncle, Randy, questioned the police claim that the victim had a concealed firearm, since his nephew was wearing boxers at that time. Delos Santos's father, Saldy, also pointed out that the pistol was recovered from the left hand of his otherwise right-handed son.

==== Reactions ====
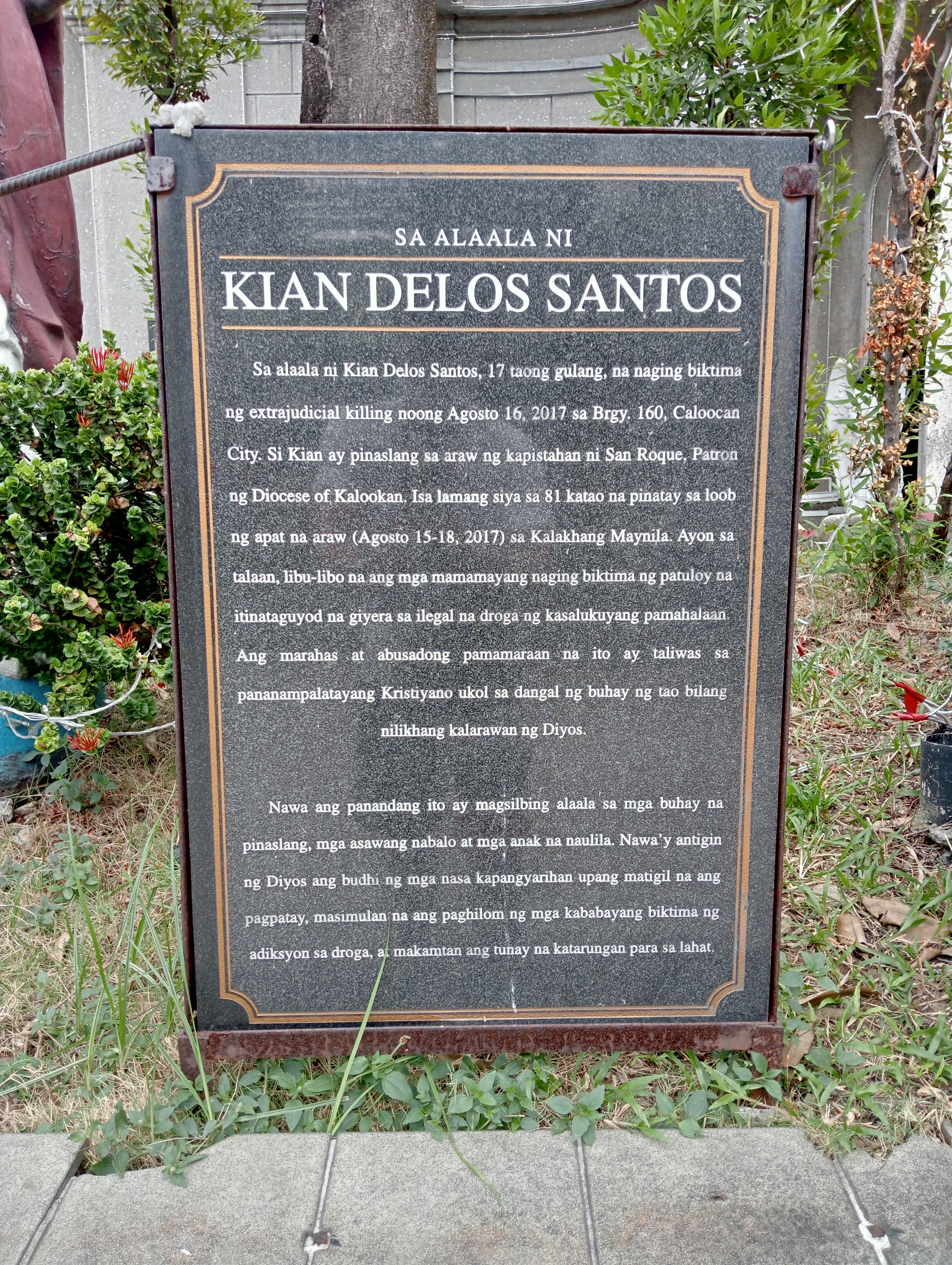
Kian delos Santos Memorial Marker at Caloocan Cathedral

===== Public Response And Protests =====
Many Filipino netizens expressed outrage over Delos Santos's death. Both the hashtag #JusticeforKian and the phrase "Kian delos Santos" were among the top Philippine trends on Twitter on August 18. A rally titled Himagsikan para kay Kian (lit. transl. "Revolution for Kian") took place on August 21 (Ninoy Aquino Day) at the People Power Monument in Quezon City. Among the groups present were Akbayan, Alliance of Progressive Labor, Alyansa Tigil Mina, Sentro, Partido ng Manggagawa, Kalipunan ng Kilusang Masa, Block Marcos, Silent Minorities, and Kalipun. Senator Bam Aquino, former Bayan Muna Representative Teddy Casiño, and former Education Secretary Armin Luistro were also present. A moment of silence was held at 8:24 p.m., the same time Delos Santos was allegedly filmed being dragged by police officers on August 16. The protesters—numbering from 500 to 1,000—also called for the investigation of other drug war killings.

Earlier that same day, the Liberal Party Youth, with the support of other groups, also held a rally at Plaza Miranda in Manila, denouncing Delos Santos's killing. The rally also commemorated the 1971 Plaza Miranda bombing and the 1983 assassination of former Senator Ninoy Aquino.

===== Public figures =====
During a press briefing on August 18, Presidential Spokesperson Ernesto Abella called the shooting of Delos Santos an "isolated" incident, and added "[President Duterte] will defend the police in their carrying out of duties. However, he will also not tolerate any abuse and any breaches of the law." On August 19, in an interview with Radyo Pilipinas, Assistant to the Presidential Spokesperson China Jocson stated: "Presidential Spokesperson Ernesto Abella would like to make it clear that the violent death of any Filipino is one death too many, especially that of Kian Loyd delos Santos. This deeply regrettable incident has triggered deep public sentiment, and challenges those in law enforcement to be wary of the reckless exercise of power and authority." Also on the same day, the Department of Education released a statement saying it "strongly condemns" the killing of grade 11 student Kian Delos Santos and that while it acknowledged "efforts to battle illegal drugs," it maintained that "upholding the rule of law should not be compromised." The agency also said that it "denounces all forms of violence against our students, teachers, and personnel." Also on August 19, during an emergency peace and order council meeting, Caloocan Mayor Oscar Malapitan said "It seems hard to believe that a 17-year-old would shoot it out with three police officers" and added: "even if Kian were indeed a drug pusher, he shouldn't have been killed unless the cops were only defending themselves. The public perception is that the cops killed Kian when he was obviously helpless."

Senator Risa Hontiveros was among the first public figures to condemn the murder of Kian delos Santos. She was one of the main initiators of a Senate investigation against the police personnel that killed Delos Santos. She also took legal custody of the witnesses of the case, with proper written consent from the minor and their parents, after fears of police retaliation against the witness surfaced. During the Senate investigation, Hontiveros caught Duterte's justice secretary, Vitaliano Aguirre II, drafting fabricated charges against her through text messages during the hearings. Aguirre's text messages instructed former Negros Oriental representative Jacinto Paras, a member of controversial group VACC, to "expedite" cases against Hontiveros, the lead investigator against the murderers of Kian delos Santos. The revelation triggered nationwide protests against Duterte's justice secretary for focusing on how to imprison Hontiveros instead of focusing on the murder case. On August 16, 2018, a year after the murder, Hontiveros filed a resolution seeking to declare every 16 August as a "National Day of Remembrance" for all the victims of extrajudicial killings (EJKs) under the Duterte government's war on drugs in commemoration of Kian delos Santos.

Arrested senator Leila de Lima, a key figure against the Philippine drug war, also condemned the murder of Kian delos Santos. She asked the Supreme Court of the Philippines to allow her to be present at the Senate investigation against the murderers of Kian, however, the court rejected her request. She criticized President Duterte after Duterte commented that the drug sweep was "good."

Senator JV Ejercito, through a series of tweets, described the incident as "very very disturbing," pointing out that Delos Santos was the same age as his eldest son. He recommended that the police officers involved should all be legally prosecuted. Senator Joel Villanueva called it the "breakdown of our humanity, with people cheering the killings of individuals who have not been proven guilty" and added that "we cannot allow lawlessness in this country." In a statement, Senator Francis Escudero described the police officers involved as "killers and criminals." While Senator Sonny Angara called for the reform of the justice system and decried vigilante justice and killings. In a statement, National Youth Commission chairperson Aiza Seguerra said: "We want to curb the drug menace; however, we are alarmed by the deaths and injury of minors in the process." Senators Antonio Trillanes, Win Gatchalian, and Loren Legarda also condemned the shooting of Delos Santos. Meanwhile, Senator Panfilo Lacson, a former police director general, insinuated that the PNP would cover up the incident.

On August 20, Vice President Leni Robredo visited the wake of Delos Santos and inspected the site of the shooting. On her weekly radio show on DZXL, Robredo condemned the shooting, saying: "kung nangyari sa kanya, puwedeng mangyari sa mga anak natin (if it happened to him, it could also happen to our children)" and later added "[I]lan na ba iyong Kian na dumaan? Ilan pa ba iyong Kian na mangyayari? Kaya tayo naman, kapag ganito, tingin ko obligasyon natin ipahayag iyong ating pagkamuhi sa ganitong klaseng pangyayari (How many Kians have we had? How many more Kians will follow? That's why when this happens, I think it is our obligation to express our condemnation)." During the visit, Robredo was accompanied by human rights lawyer Jose Manuel Diokno of the Free Legal Assistance Group (FLAG), who offered his legal services to the Delos Santos family. Other politicians who visited the wake include Senators Bam Aquino, Risa Hontiveros, and Antonio Trillanes, Kabataan Partylist representative Sarah Elago, Caloocan Mayor Oscar Malapitan, and former Vice President Jejomar Binay. Representatives from Amnesty International, the Commission on Human Rights, and Iglesia ni Cristo also visited Delos Santos's wake.

Kalookan Bishop Pablo Virgilio David condemned the shooting, calling it a "very specific case of abuse." and saying "‘I don’t believe the police story that Kian Loyd, the grade 11 boy, died because he fought back and engaged three policemen in a shootout using a caliber 45," Bishop David also criticized the ongoing drug war and the alleged abuses by the police. Father Antonio Moreno, head of the Society of Jesus in the Philippines, called Delos Santos's death a "heartless killing." Fellow Jesuit Father Jose Ramon Villarin, president of Ateneo de Manila University, also condemned the killing of Delos Santos. Lasallian Brother Armin Luistro, former Secretary of Education, called for "a minute of silence every night at 8:24 p.m. to remember Kian Loyd delos Santos and all innocent victims of merciless deaths in our land." Lingayen-Dagupan Archbishop Socrates Villegas, who is also the president of the Catholic Bishops' Conference of the Philippines (CBCP), ordered the churches in his archdiocese to ring their bells from 8:00 to 8:15 p.m. every night from August 22 to November 27 in honor of Delos Santos, and as "a call to stop approval of the killings." (Note: Translated from Filipino: Ang tunog ng kampana ay tawag na ihinto ang pagsang-ayon sa patayan.)

PNP Director General Ronald dela Rosa expressed regret over Delos Santos's death, saying he was "very sorry for what happened" but added that he would rather see his police officers alive than dead. Dela Rosa also promised an investigation on the killing, saying: "Basta pag merong pang-aabuso hindi ko palalampasin 'yan." ("If there was indeed abuse [of authority] I will not let it pass.") Despite the incident, he guaranteed that the campaign against illegal drugs would continue. He also refused to visit Delos Santos's wake, believing it was inappropriate for him to do so, since the main suspects were police officers. He also claimed that visiting the wake would make him pretentious like the politicians.

When President Rodrigo Duterte saw the CCTV tape, he allegedly called Dela Rosa 'as fast as [he] can' and asked the PNP to jail the police officers involved in Kian's killing. The president also "warned" some police officers. He later visited the wake of Delos Santos.

===== Kian Bill =====
In November 2024, Akbayan's Perci Cendaña authored House Bill No. 11044, the “Kian Bill,” which aims to ban “tokhang”, drug lists and torture among others in the Philippine drug war.

==== Investigation ====
The three police officers, who were tagged in the shooting of Delos Santos, were relieved from their posts. An autopsy was conducted on August 20, showed that Delos Santos sustained three gunshot wounds: the first entry point was at the back of the head, the second entry point was behind the left ear and the third entry point was inside the left ear.

The family of Delos Santos, on August 25, filed murder and torture charges against police officers involved in the drug operation.

==== Convictions and later events ====
Three Caloocan police officers, Arnel Oares, Jeremiah Pereda, and Jerwin Cruz were found guilty of murdering Delos Santos during a drug sting in 2017. Caloocan Regional Trial Court Branch 125 Judge Rodolfo Azucena on November 29, 2018, sentenced the three to reclusion perpetua, or up to 40 years in prison, without the possibility of parole.

On June 4, 2018, President Rodrigo Duterte approved the return to active duty of Roberto Fajardo after Fajardo was appointed chief PNP-Highway Patrol Group, nearly a year after he was relieved from duty for the murder of Delos Santos.

On August 15, 2022, the remains of Kian delos Santos were exhumed in La Loma Cemetery in Caloocan. Their bodies would be reexamined by forensic expert Dr. Raquel Fortun as part of the investigation on his death; it would be transferred in another gravesite in the same cemetery.

=== Carl Arnaiz and Reynaldo de Guzman ===
The case of Kian delos Santos has been likened to the cases of other teenagers, 19-year-old Carl Arnaiz and 14-year-old Reynaldo "Kulot" De Guzman.

Arnaiz went missing for 10 days; his dead body was found on August 28 in a morgue in Caloocan. According to the Caloocan police, Arnaiz was involved in a robbery at C-3 road. The police alleged that Arnaiz drew a gun to rob a taxi driver. Arnaiz allegedly shot responding police officers PO1 Jefrey Perez and PO1 Ricky Arquilita, who fired back and killed the teenager. The police claimed in an August 30 report that they retrieved two packs of marijuana in Arnaiz's pocket and three packs of a substance suspected to be methamphetamine in his backpack.

CCTV footage of the streets of Brgy. 28, Caloocan, showed three men in motorcycles followed by a taxi at 3:40 a.m. Arnaiz allegedly robbed the taxi driver named Tomas Bagcal. Afterwards, the escorting motorcycles left the area. Aside from Bagcal, there were other passengers present who were named as PO1 Jeffrey Perez, de Guzman, Arnaiz, and an unnamed man. According to a witness, the man who emerged from the taxi talking on the phone was PO1 Perez. Shortly, Perez returns to the taxi. At 3:47 a.m., the taxi parked on the sidewalk; though it was not shown on the CCTV footage, however, according to the witness, another taxi approached and reported the robbery. A few minutes later, the taxi leaves and heads to C3 with de Guzman, Arnaiz, Perez, and the unnamed man on board. Two gunshots were heard by the witness. When investigating the source of the gunshots, the witness saw the lifeless body of Carl Arnaiz at the grassy area. Investigation team found .38 caliber revolver and three bullet containers that were allegedly used to return fire at the police.

In early September 2017, the witness added that Perez accompanied de Guzman at the police mobile in C3. However, the statements of the witness and Bagcal contradicted each other. On September 4, a paraffin test concluded that Arnaiz's right hand tested positive of gunpowder residue. During the Senate hearing, according to the PNP Crime Laboratory, Arnaiz sustained five gunshots in the body (four in the chest and one in the stomach). There were abrasions found on Arnaiz's body but the police cannot determine the cause of it.

According to his parents, Arnaiz left his house in Cainta, Rizal, with de Guzman to eat midnight snacks on August 17. Arnaiz's father says that his son's only vice is smoking and denied he possessed said contraband.

De Guzman's alleged body was found floating half-naked in Kinamatayang Kabayo creek in the town of Gapan, Nueva Ecija. De Guzman's father theorized that his son may have been killed so he could not testify against the killers of Arnaiz. The PNP conducted a DNA test on the corpse and said that the body is not De Guzman's. However, his parents disputed the findings saying that they are certain that the body is that of their son. According to the investigation, de Guzman sustained 30 stab wounds in the body.

On January 19, 2018, in a 35-page resolution released to reporters, the Department of Justice (DOJ) indicted Perez and Arquilita with two counts of murder after probable cause for the slay of the two teenagers was found. Perez and Arquilita were also charged with two counts of torture and three counts of planting of evidence. The Caloocan Regional Trial Court (RTC) Branch 122 issued warrant arrests against the aforementioned police officers. The warrants of arrest were dated January 23. No bail was recommended.

The two accused were later underwent custody in the National Capital Region Police Office in Taguig City until March when Branch 122, upon granting the prosecution's manifestation, ordered their detention at the Valenzuela City Detention Center.

The case faced issue on jurisdiction. It was said that the murder took place in Navotas and not in Caloocan, citing witness' claim. In May, Branch 122 dismissed the murder charges against the policemen. DOJ later re-filed the case before the Navotas City RTC. However, the Branch 122 judge said that while withdrawal of charges mid-trial is not permitted by the law, the legal option would be dropping such without causing harm. Since then, the case underwent trial at the Navotas RTC Branch 287.

On April 20, 2019, Arquilita reportedly died of Hepatitis B while in jail. Navotas City RTC later dropped the charges against him and, in August, denied the bail petition of the two accused.

==== Conviction ====
In its decision dated November 10, 2022, and later promulgation of the case, Caloocan RTC Branch 122 convicted Perez of the following:

- Violation of Anti-Torture Act (Republic Act 9745); sentencing him to both a prison term (6 months to four years and two months) in the Arnaiz case, and reclusión perpetua in the de Guzman case in relation to Family Courts Act of 1997 (RA 8369).
- Planting of evidence against Arnaiz; under Comprehensive Dangerous Drugs Act of 2002 (RA 9165) sentencing him to twice life imprisonment as well as "absolute perpetual disqualification from any public office," and under Comprehensive Firearms and Ammunition Regulation Act (RA 10591), with penalty of reclusión perpetua.

It is the second such conviction in relation to the government's drug war after the 2018 conviction on delos Santos case.

Meanwhile, the same court dismissed criminal cases against the deceased, Arquilita.

In another decision publicized on March 13, 2023, Navotas RTC Branch 287 convicted Perez of two counts of murder, sentencing him to reclusion perpetua without eligibility for parole.

On April 10, 2025, the Court of Appeals upheld Perez' conviction for torture and planting of evidence.

The case was elevated to the Supreme Court through consolidated appeals and a petition arising from the Court of Appeals’ decision affirming the Regional Trial Court's conviction of the accused for murder. Due to differing procedural actions taken by the accused after the appellate ruling, issues arose regarding the timeliness and propriety of the remedies pursued, including the issuance of a partial entry of judgment declaring the decision final and executory as to some of the accused.

On December 22, 2025, The Supreme Court resolved these procedural issues and, in the interest of justice, treated the defective petition as an appeal and consolidated it with the other appeals. Upon review, the Court found no reversible error in the Court of Appeals’ findings and held that the evidence sufficiently established the guilt of the accused beyond reasonable doubt, including the presence of conspiracy and treachery.

Accordingly, the Supreme Court affirmed the Court of Appeals’ decision in full, sustaining the convictions and penalties imposed.
