= Ricardo de Leon =

Retired police general (born 1962)

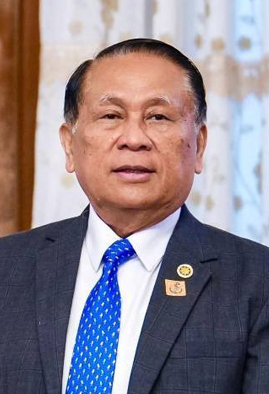
- De Leon in 2023

Director of the National Intelligence Coordinating Agency
- Incumbent
- Assumed office June 30, 2022

Regional Director of the National Capital Region Police Office
- In office 2003–2004
- Preceded by: PDDGen. Reynaldo Velasco
- Succeeded by: PDir. Avelino Razon

Director of the Quezon City Police District
- Director of the Central Police District Command
- In office 1994–1996
- Preceded by: PCSupt. Diony A. Ventura
- Succeeded by: PCSupt. Hercules Cataluna

Personal details
- Born: Ricardo F. de Leon; September 10, 1949 (age 76)
- Education: Philippine Military Academy(BS); Philippine Christian University(MS); Pamantasan ng Lungsod ng Maynila(MBA); Bicol University(PhD)
- Police career
- Service: Philippine National Police
- Divisions: Office of the Deputy Chief of Staff for Operations, PNP; National Capital Region Police Office; Police Communuity Relations Group; Philippine Center for Transnational Crimes (PCTC); Police Regional Office 6; Police Regional Office 5; Central Police District; Provincial Command, Cavite; Provincial Command, Davao del Norte
- Service years: 1971–2005
- Rank: Deputy Director General

Ricardo F. de Leon is a Filipino retired police officer who is the current director of the National Intelligence Coordinating Agency of the Philippines.

== Education ==
De Leon attended the Philippine Military Academy (PMA), graduating from the institution in 1971 as part of the Matatag class. He also attended the Pamantasan ng Lungsod ng Maynila where he obtained a master's degree in business administration, the Philippine Christian University where he acquired master's degree in management, and at Bicol University where he obtained a doctorate in peace and security studies.

== Career ==
=== Police career ===
De Leon was an officer of the Philippine National Police. After graduating from the PMA, he took the Scout Ranger Course Class 14. The unit would serve a role in the foiling of the MV Karagatan plot of the Communist rebels in 1971. He would also escort the Marcos family exile to Hawaii in the aftermath of the People Power Revolution of 1986.

He would return to the Philippines as a lieutenant colonel, and was kept under floating status for a year until he was appointed as the director in Davao del Norte.

At age 44, he was promoted to a "star rank". He would serve under various capacity under the PNP such as at Cavite PNP, the Central Police District (CPD); PRO 5 and 6, staff positions at Camp Crame, director of the National Capital Region Police Office and as head of the Philippine Center for Transnational Crimes (PCTC), and Deputy Chief of Operations.

In 2004, de Leon was appointed as commander of the Anti-Illegal Drugs Special Operations Task Force during the administration of President Gloria Macapagal-Arroyo.

He would retire from the Philippine police force on September 10, 2005, as PNP Deputy Chief for Administration when he reached the mandatory retirement age of 56.

=== Post-retirement ===
De Leon would become president of the Mindanao State University, the first non-Mindanaoan and non-Muslim to do so upon his retirement from the police in 2005. He would also become vice president of Centro Escolar University. From 2014 to 2022, he served as president of the Philippine Public Safety College. He was appointed to the position by then President Benigno Aquino III.

De Leon would be selected by then-President elect Bongbong Marcos as director of the National Intelligence Coordinating Agency (NICA). He would pledge to give focus on the South China Sea dispute as well as local intelligence gathering at the barangay level, especially for the purpose of improving intelligence validation concerning the illegal drug trade in the country.
