= Eastern Police District =

Police command in the eastern Metro Manila

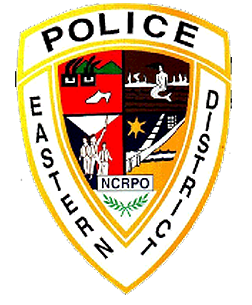
- Logo
- Common name: Eastern Police District
- Abbreviation: EPD

Agency overview
- Formed: August 8, 1975
- Preceding agency: List; Mandaluyong Police Department (until 1975); Marikina Police Department (until 1975); Pasig Police Department (until 1975); San Juan Police Department (until 1975)

Jurisdictional structure
- Operations jurisdiction: Mandaluyong, Marikina, Pasig, San Juan

Operational structure
- Headquarters: Barangay Malinao, Pasig, Metro Manila
- Agency executive: PBGEN Roman Cornel Arugay, District Director
- Parent agency: National Capital Region Police Office

Facilities
- Stations: 4 city police stations

Website
- ncrpo.pnp.gov.ph

The Eastern Police District (EPD) is a police district command under the National Capital Region Police Office (NCRPO) of the Philippine National Police (PNP) serves the cities named Mandaluyong, Marikina, Pasig, and San Juan as its law enforcement agency. The headquarters are located at in Pasig.

== History ==
The police departments of Mandaluyong, Marikina, Pasig, and San Juan are merged to form the Eastern Police District (EPD), by virtue of the creation of the Integrated National Police in 1975 by Presidential Decree No. 765.

== Lists of chiefs ==
The following list only started from 2003:

Name	Term	Notes
As chief of the Eastern Police District
Rowland Albano	1999 – 2001	
George Ali	2000 – 2001	
Victor Luga	2001 – 2003	
Rolando Sacramento	2003 – 2004	
Oscar Valenzuela	2004 – 2006	
Charlemagne Alejandrino	2006 – 2007	
Luizo Ticman	2007	
Leon Nilo dela Cruz	2007 – 2008	
Lino Calingasan	2008 – 2009	
Lina Sarmiento	2009 – 2010	First female district director
Francisco Manalo Jr.	2010 – 2014	
Abelardo Villacorta	2014 – 2015	
Elmer Jamias	2015 – 2016	
Romulo Sapitula	2016 – 2017	
Reynaldo Biay	2017 – 2018	
Alfred Corpus	2018 – 2019	
Christopher Tambungan	2019	
Johnson Almazan	2019 – 2021	
Matthew Baccay	2020 – 2021	
Orlando Yebra Jr.	2021 – 2022	
Jerry Bearis	2022	
Wilson Asueta	2023 – 2024	
Villamor Q. Tuliao	2024 – present	

== Units ==
=== Headquarters ===
Under the Director, EPD it has:

- Deputy District Director for Administration
- Deputy District Director for Operation
- Chief District Directorial Staff
- Secretary to Directorial Staff
- Office of the District Executive Senior Police Office

The administrative divisions are:

- District Personnel and Records Management Division
- District Logistic Division
- District Comptrollership Division

The operational divisions and units are:

- District Intelligence Division
- District Operation and Plans Division
- District Community Affairs and Development Division
- District Investigative and Detective Management Division
- District Drug Enforcement Unit
- District Headquarters Support Unit
- District Mobile Force Battalion
- District Traffic Enforcement Unit
- District Special Operation Unit
- Anti-Carnapping Unit
- District Tactical Motorized Unit

=== Stations ===
- Mandaluyong City Police Station
- Marikina City Police Station
- Pasig City Police Station
- San Juan City Police Station

== See also ==
- National Capital Region Police Office
  - Northern Police District
  - Manila Police District
  - Quezon City Police District
  - Southern Police District
