= Driving etiquette =

General courtesy rules vehicle drivers expected to follow

Driving etiquette refers to the unwritten or unspoken rules that drivers follow. The term dates back to the early 1900s and the use of horse-drawn carriages. Driving etiquette typically involves being courteous and staying alert, which varies by vehicle, situation and location (e.g., etiquette for driving an F-1 race car has different rules than driving an RV). Failure to adhere to this behavior can cause an increased risk of legal consequences, road collisions, trauma and road rage.

Driving etiquette can extend beyond in-vehicle actions: When a courteous driver scrapes the fender or inflicts minor damage to a parked car without its owner present, they leave a note giving their name, telephone number, and the name of their insurance company. If the owner is present, the courteous driver exchanges insurance information politely and contacts the proper authorities. Breaches in driving etiquette can often be addressed cordially with a simple and immediate expression of apology. Its guiding principle is "one good turn deserves another", and is considered a vital part of responsible driving. Speeding and aggressive driving, examples of poor driving etiquette, have been cited as negative factors related to rural highways. Drivers need driving etiquette education to lower the risk of causing accidents.

In some jurisdictions most (or at least a few) of these actions are not only considered rude, but they are also illegal under the local driving codes.

== Examples of poor driving etiquette ==
The following acts are commonly cited as examples of poor driving etiquette.

"Nudging" pedestrians
Involves drivers coaxing pedestrians who are trying to cross a crosswalk by honking or crowding them.

Elongated/excessive honking
Honking is acceptable in certain situations, however it becomes excessive when it involves, for instance, honking at a car that is already signaling to make a turn, or at a car with the hazards blinking (the car may be in poor mechanical shape or there is a problem on the road ahead of the driver). Also involves honking when there are other cars in front of the car in front of you, or at a red light. It is sometimes used to bully other drivers into increasing their speed, especially when they are already at or over the speed limit, but in this instance, it is also accompanied by tailgating. This is normally used by aggressive, high-strung drivers.

Tailgating
Involves driving dangerously close to the vehicle ahead (often in an attempt to encourage them to increase their speed). This action can distract the operator of the forward vehicle and reduces the stopping time of the rear vehicle in case of sudden speed changes. This is generally used by aggressive drivers. Additionally, this may affect the driver of the forward car emotionally, sometimes to the point the offended driver may consider soaring to illegal speeds in an attempt to escape, which in turn creates an additional aggressive driver.

Double parking
Double-parked vehicles can disrupt traffic flow, causing other motorists to navigate their way around them.

Driving in busy areas with high beams on
At night this action can blind oncoming traffic, making it more difficult for vehicles to safely follow the road. When following another vehicle, glare from this action can reduce the effectiveness of the forward vehicle's mirrors — reducing situational awareness and increasing the likelihood of an accident.

Refusing to yield right-of-way to other vehicles
Merging vehicles must accelerate or brake unsafely or can be forced off the road at the end of a merging lane due to this action.

Driving with loud, distracting music
Reduces the driver's ability to hear and react to noises around the vehicle (including emergency-vehicle sirens).

Driving a vehicle with snow and ice covering it
Can endanger others if the snow-covered vehicle reaches highway speeds and chunks of ice/snow fly off behind the vehicle. Snow and ice can also slide down from the roof to block visibility from the rear window in the car, reducing the driver's situational awareness.

Changing lanes and turning without use of signals
Increases the likelihood of an accident by surprising other drivers with a lane change or turn unexpectedly.

Cutting off other motorists
Refers to a vehicle that enters a lane without proper caution, leaving a small amount of distance between other surrounding vehicles. This can be caused by unawareness of surroundings, impatience, and/or aggressiveness.

Driving below the speed of traffic in center or passing lanes
Causes a disruption in traffic flow as other vehicles must either slow to match the offending vehicle's speed, and may be forced to pass on the wrong side.

Distracted driving (includes talking/texting on the phone, smoking, drinking, and eating)
Reduces driver awareness of the road and the likelihood of collision increase has been linked to drunk driving.

== See also ==
- Etiquette
- Rules of the road
