= Northern Police District =

Police command in the Northern Metro Manila

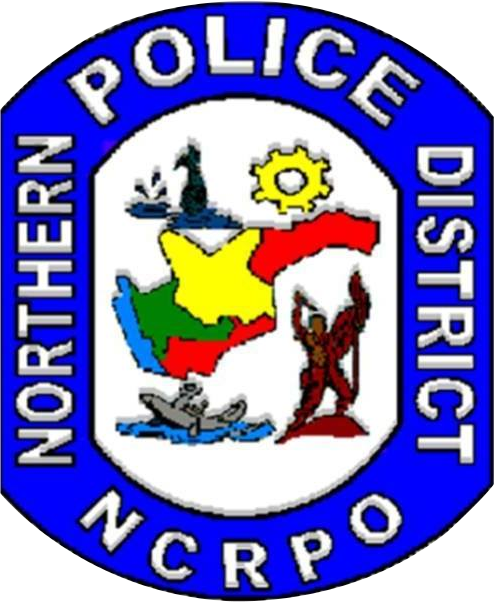
- Logo
- Common name: Northern Police District
- Abbreviation: NPD

Agency overview
- Formed: August 8, 1975
- Preceding agency: List; Caloocan Police Department (until 1975); Malabon Police Department (until 1975); Navotas Police Department (until 1975); Valenzuela Police Department (until 1975); Quezon City Police Department (1939– 1975)

Jurisdictional structure
- Operations jurisdiction: Caloocan, Malabon, Navotas, Valenzuela

Operational structure
- Headquarters: Caloocan, Metro Manila
- Agency executive: PBGEN Benliner L. Capili, District Director
- Parent agency: National Capital Region Police Office

Facilities
- Stations: 4 city police stations

Website
- ncrpo.pnp.gov.ph

The Northern Police District (NPD) is a police district command under the National Capital Region Police Office (NCRPO) of the Philippine National Police (PNP) serves the cities named Caloocan, Malabon, Navotas, Valenzuela as its law enforcement agency. The headquarters located at Caloocan.

== History ==
The police departments of Caloocan, Malabon, Navotas, Valenzuela and Quezon City were merged to form the Northern Police District (NPD), by virtue of the creation of the Integrated National Police in 1975 by Presidential Decree No. 765 and having headquarters in Camp Karingal. In 1990, the Quezon City Council created an ordinance to separate from NPD to create the Central Police District, and by 1993, the headquarters was transferred to Caloocan.

== Lists of chiefs ==
The following list only started from 2001:

Name	Term	Notes
As chief of the Northern Police District
Jose Bandong	2000 – 2001	
Vidal Querol	2001 – 2002	
Marcelino Franco Jr.	2003 – 2004	
Noe Wong	2004 – 2005	
Leopoldo Bataoil	2005 – 2006	
Pedro Tango	2006 – 2008	
Erick Javier	2008 – 2009	
Samuel Pagdilao	2009 – 2010	
Rodolfo Magtibay	2010	Transferred back to MPD
Antonio Decano	2010 – 2012	
Edgardo Layug	2012 – 2014	
Jonathan Ferdinand Miano	2014 – 2016	
Roberto Fajardo	2016 – 2017	Chief when the triple murders happened
Clifton Empiso	2017 – 2018	
Gregorio Lim	2018	
Rolando Anduyan	2018 – 2019	
Rolando Ylagan	2019 – 2020	
Eliseo DC Cruz	2020 – 2021	
Ponce Peñones	2022 – 2023	
Rizalito G. Gapas	2023 – 2024	
Josefino D. Ligan	2024 – 2025	
Christopher B. Dela Cruz	2025	

== Units ==
=== Headquarters ===
Under the Director, NPD it has:

- Deputy District Director for Administration
- Deputy District Director for Operation
- Chief District Directorial Staff
- Secretary to Directorial Staff
- Office of the District Executive Senior Police Office

The administrative divisions are:

- District Personnel and Records Management Division
- District Logistic Division
- District Comptrollership Division

The operational divisions and units are:

- District Intelligence Division
- District Operation and Plans Division
- District Community Affairs and Development Division
- District Investigative and Detective Management Division
- District Drug Enforcement Unit
- District Headquarters Support Unit
- District Mobile Force Battalion
- District Traffic Enforcement Unit
- District Special Operation Unit
- Anti-Carnapping Unit
- District Tactical Motorized Unit

=== Stations ===
- Caloocan City Police Station
- Malabon City Police Station
- Navotas City Police Station
- Valenzuela City Police Station

== Controversies ==
=== The de los Santos, Arnaiz, and de Guzman Murders ===
Kian delos Santos, Carl Arnaiz and Reynaldo de Guzman were three teenagers who were killed on August 16 to 18, 2017, during the course of the Philippine drug war. All of them are allegedly killed by different Caloocan Police Station officers. delos Santos got a gunshot wound to the head, Arnaiz reported to have been shot dead, while de Guzman was stabbed 30 times and found in a creek in Gapan, Nueva Ecija. All of the cases are seen in CCTV footages.

Only PO1 Jefrey Perez was convicted of by Caloocan RTC of murder, torture, and planting of evidence.

== See also ==
- National Capital Region Police Office
  - Eastern Police District
  - Manila Police District
  - Quezon City Police District
  - Southern Police District
