= Manila Police District =

PNP's police district in the City of Manila

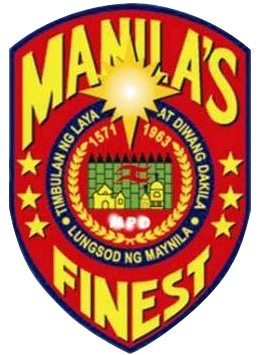
- Manila Police District patch depicting the department logo, including the old arms of the City of Manila
- Common name: Manila Police District
- Abbreviation: MPD
- Motto: Manila's Finest; The Buoy of Liberty and a Great Spirit (Timbulan ng Laya at Diwang Dakila) (Boya de Libertad y Gran Espiritu)

Agency overview
- Formed: January 9, 1901
- Preceding agencies: Manila Police Department (until 1978); Western Police District

Jurisdictional structure
- Operations jurisdiction: Manila, Philippines

Operational structure
- Headquarters: Manila Police District Headquarters, United Nations Avenue, Ermita, Manila
- Agency executive: PBGEN Arnold C. Santiago, District Director
- Parent agency: National Capital Region Police Office

Facilities
- Stations: 14 Police stations

Website
- http://pnp.gov.ph/portal/

The Manila Police District (MPD) is the agency of the Philippine National Police (PNP) responsible for law enforcement in the City of Manila including the Manila South Cemetery exclave. Formerly known as the Western Police District (WPD), the MPD is under the National Capital Region Police Office (NCRPO), which also handles the Quezon City, Eastern, Northern and Southern Police Districts.

== History ==
=== American period ===
The United States Army took over the duty of enforcing public order in Manila upon its fall in 1898. It consisted of military units under the command of Brigadier General Arthur MacArthur Jr. as Provost Marshal General.

By virtue of Act No. 70 of the US Philippine (Taft) Commission, enacted and implemented on January 9, 1901, MacArthur, being Provost Marshal General and military governor at that time, organized the Metropolitan Police Force of Manila, with himself as its first chief. The Act also authorized its operation outside its jurisdiction. An entirely American body, the force was first stationed at the present-day Goldenberg Mansion, San Miguel.

With the enactment of Act No. 183 on July 31 of the same year that established the Manila city charter which became effective a week later, the power vested in the Provost Marshal to exercise general supervisory control over the police and other departments of the city government was transferred; the force was reorganized and was headed first by Lieutenant Colonel John L. Tiernon, and later by Captain George Curry.

The police force was renamed into the Manila Police Department, and was initially composed by 357 troops from the American Volunteer Force to the Philippines. The MPD has jurisdiction five miles from the city limits and three miles from the shores to Manila Bay. This led into disputes with the Philippine Constabulary, which had police powers elsewhere in the Philippines. In 1907, the MPD was split into two: the Meisic Police Station north of the Pasig River and the Luneta Police Station south of the river. By 1935, the headquarters was moved to the new Manila City Hall. On March 2, 1936, Antonio Torres, then a member of the Manila City Council, was appointed chief, the first Filipino do so.

=== Japanese to Liberation era ===
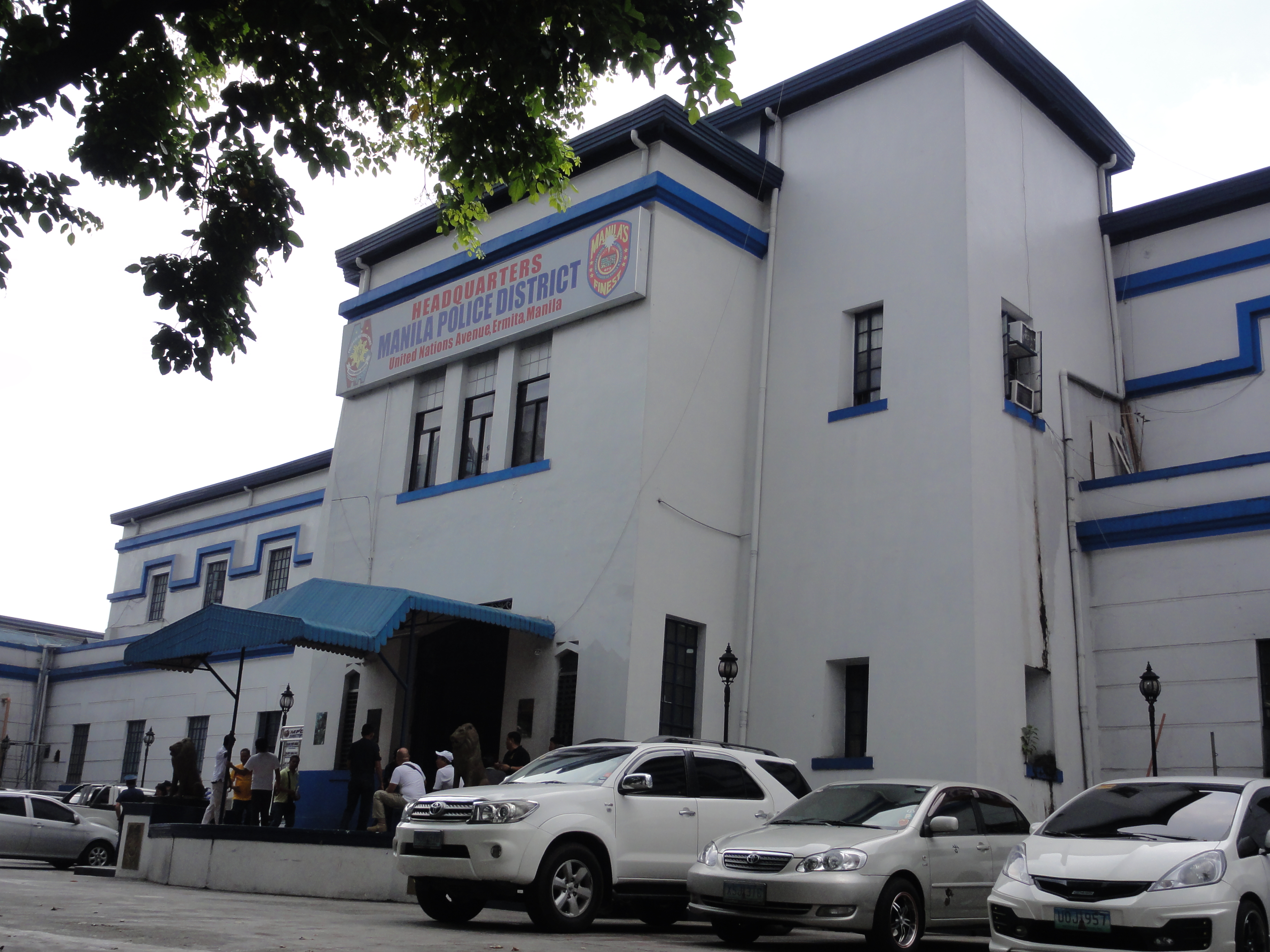
Manila Police District (MPD) Headquarters in UN Avenue, Ermita since 1949.

However, in 1942 at the outset of World War II, the Kempetai, the Japanese Military Police, ordered Torres to submit to their authority. After the Battle of Manila, the combined American and Filipino troops reorganized the police force, and Allied forces were appointed chiefs until the appointment of Lamberto Javalera as acting chief of police.

=== Third Republic ===
In 1949, the MPD transferred their headquarters for the last time, in a newly constructed building at the corner of San Marcelino and Isaac Peral (now United Nations Avenue); the funding of the reconstruction came from the Philippine Rehabilitation Act of 1948. By this time, the President of the Philippines had appointment powers to the office. Notable was the appointment of Ricardo Papa, who organized an anti-smuggling unit that minimized smuggling in the city.

In 1970, amidst of the "First Quarter Storm" student protests, MPD was tasked together with METROCOM to protect and ensure the security of President Ferdinand Marcos and First Lady Imelda Marcos in the Legislative Building while the President delivered his State of the Nation Address. The said protest was largely peaceful until the end of the program, but disagreements arose over who will control the protest stage. After Marcos finished his speech, he walked out the legislative building, jeered by the protesters with throwing pebbles and paper balls, as well as the protest effigies which portrayed a crocodile and a coffin representing the death of democracy, at Marcos and his retinue.

Marcos and the First Lady successfully escaped to the presidential limousine, leaving MPD and METROCOM to disperse the crowd. This led to hours of confrontation between the protesters and the police, ending with at least two students dead and several more students injured.

=== Martial law to late WPD days ===
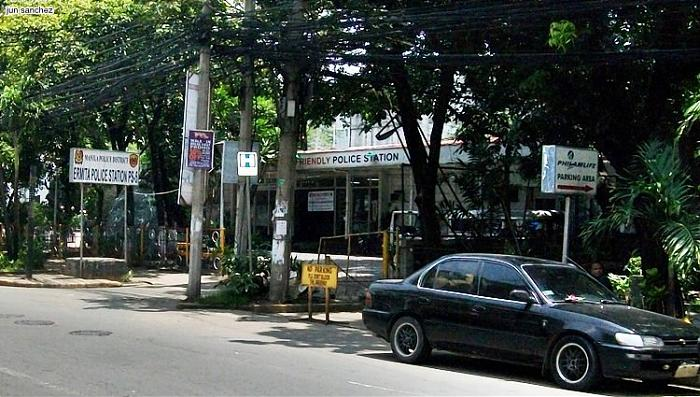
Facade of the Ermita Police Station of the Manila Police District.

On September 21, 1972, President Marcos declared martial law nationwide and in 1974, he appointed James Barbers as its police chief. In 1975, Barber's position was called as Superintendent (Police Chief), with Marcos creating the Integrated National Police with the Philippine Constabulary as its nucleus. MPD change its name as the Western Police District (WPD) under of Metropolitan Police Force (MPF), INP's Metro Manila counterpart of METROCOM.

On February 26, 1986, Marcos was overthrown after the People Power Revolution. A few months later, Alfredo Lim was appointed chief and increased the number of precincts from six to ten. Lim would later be director of the National Bureau of Investigation, Mayor of Manila and Senator. In 1990, the Interior and Local Government Act 1990.was promulgated, that created the Philippine National Police, absorbing the Philippine Constabulary. Other notable names who had been named as WPD chief are Hermogenes Ebdane on November 5, 1993, and Avelino Razon on June 16, 1996, and December 20, 1999. The two were later named chiefs of the PNP.

=== As MPD to Present ===
On July 20, 2005, the WPD reverted to their former name back to the Manila Police District (MPD), by the National Police Commission (NAPOLCOM).

On August 23, 2010, a tourist bus from Hong Kong was hijacked in Luneta in Ermita, by a dismissed police officer named Rolando Mendoza. By noon, three additional hostages, including the Filipino tour guide and the two photographers who volunteered to be taken hostage, had also been released. Superintendent Orlando Yebra and Chief inspector Romeo Salvador led negotiations. Seventeen people remained on the bus.

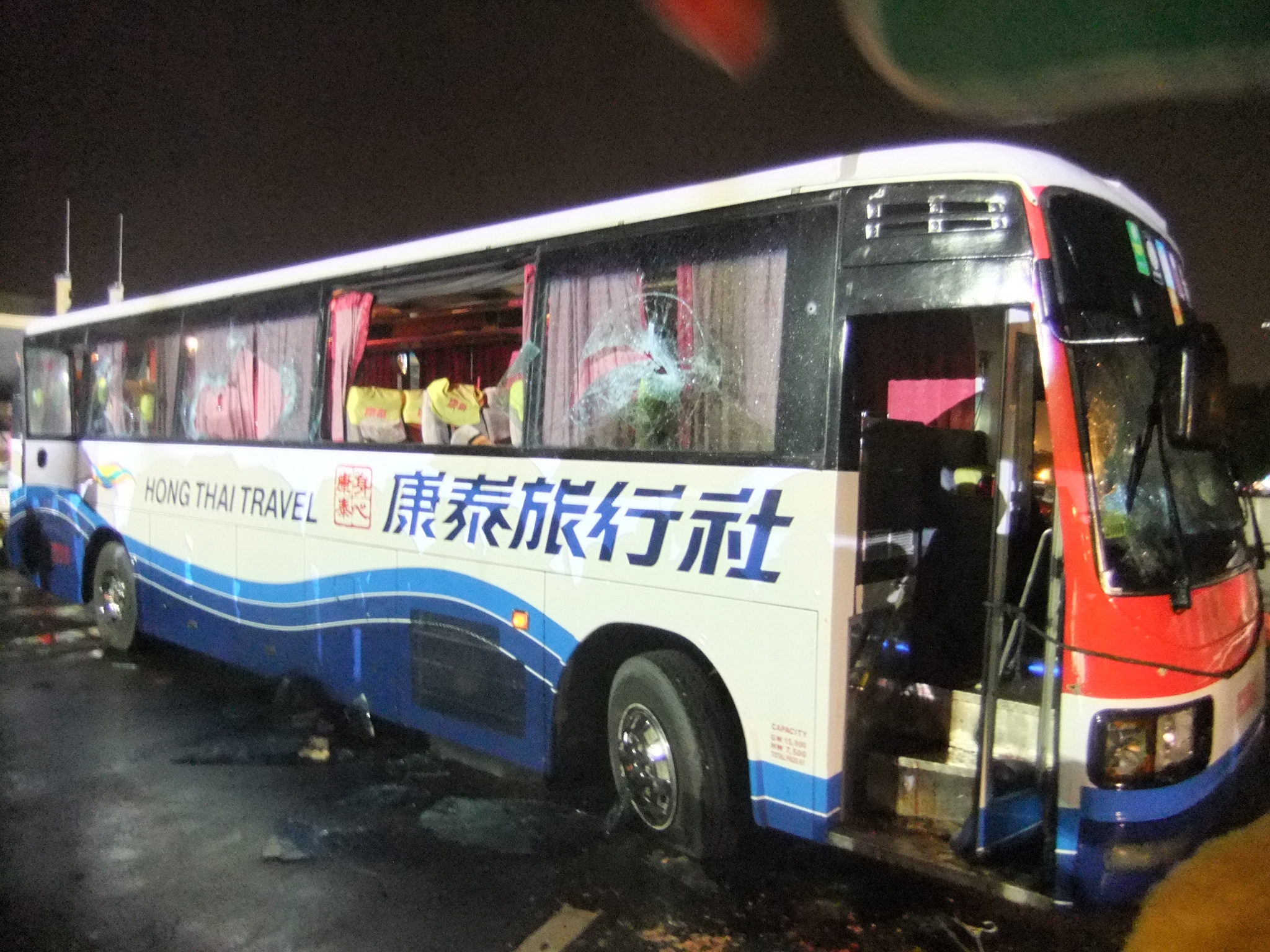
Aftermath of the 2010 Manila Bus Hostage Crisis.

When the Manila Police District (MPD) SWAT team arrived, Mendoza declared in a radio interview with DZXL that he would kill the passengers if the SWAT team did not leave. His brother, SPO2 Gregorio Mendoza, walked out after trying to negotiate with him. He urged Mendoza to surrender peacefully. Gregorio Mendoza was then arrested for breaching the exclusion zone while carrying a gun, as he did not have the MPD's approval to assist in the negotiations.

Mendoza became agitated when he witnessed live coverage of his brother's arrest from the bus television. Reports indicated that Mendoza fired warning shots as he saw his brother being carried away. Mendoza demanded that the police release his brother, or else he would start executing hostages, and a few minutes later claimed on live radio that he had, indeed, already shot two hostages.

The SWAT team started to surround the bus at 7:37 pm. The team failed to enter the bus for nearly an hour. Initial attempts to break the shatter-resistant Plexiglass windows with a sledgehammer failed. At 7:45 pm, a rope was tied to the front doors of the bus, which snapped when they attempted to pull the door open.

After running out of choices, they threw two canisters of tear gas inside and Mendoza stepped out of the bus. Snipers, who had taken positions earlier in the day, ultimately shot Mendoza in the head as he went to exit the bus, killing him instantly and causing his body to hang part way out the window of the bus door. By that time, as a thunderstorm dumped rain on the area, however, four more hostages were confirmed dead, while only six hostages were confirmed alive and not seriously injured.

== Anniversary commemoration ==
The anniversary of the Manila police force was celebrated on July 31 until the early 1980s when records showed that it was actually on January 9.

The issue of changing the foundation date began when Brig. Gen. James Barbers, then WPD superintendent, had read the 1933 book Philippine Police System and Its Problems, called Miguel Parungao, historian and curator of the Manila Metropolitan Police Museum, who was able to confirm the information by finding the document of Act No. 70. It also confirmed the fact that MacArthur, not Curry, was the first Manila police chief.

This was eventually resolved by top law enforcement officials when WPD, under the leadership of P/Brig. Gen. Narciso Cabrera, observed for the first time the actual foundation on January 9, 1983.

== Organization ==
The MPD is organized into eleven (11) police stations and several district support units:

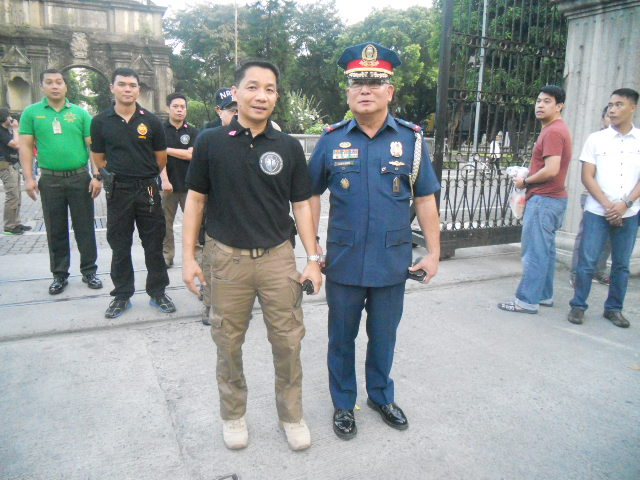
MPD Director - P/CSUPT ISAGANI F GENABE PNP supervises the security operations during the 2013 Philippine Bar Examination.

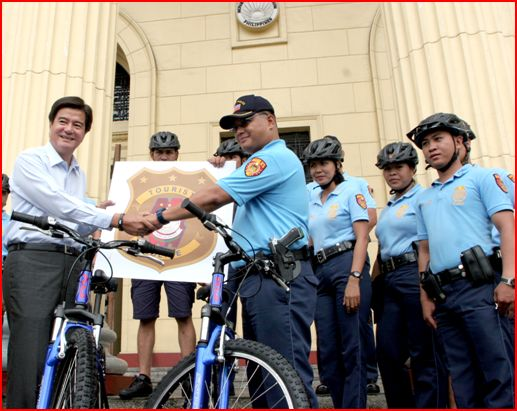
DOT Secretary Alberto Lim turns over to PSRINSP Jovan Sicat twenty (20) bikes for the use of the Manila Police District Tourist Police.

=== Base Units ===
Administrative Support Units

- District Tactical Operations Center
- District Headquarters Support Unit
- District Headquarters Service Unit
- District Human Resources and Administration Office
- District Internal Affairs Service
- District Legal Unit
- District Chaplain Service
- District Information Technology Unit
- District Scene Of the Crime Operatives

Operations Support Units

- District Public Safety Battalion
- District Traffic Enforcement Group
- District Criminal Investigation and Detection Unit
- District Anti-Illegal Drugs - Special Operations Task Group
- District Public Information Office
- District Highway Patrol Group
- Criminal Investigation and Detection Group
- District Intelligence Division

=== Line Units ===
- MPD Station 1 (Balut Police Station) - Balut, Tondo
- MPD Station 2 (Moriones Police Station) - Moriones, Tondo
- MPD Station 3 (Sta Cruz Police Station) - Sta Cruz, Manila
- MPD Station 4 (Sampaloc Police Station) - Sampaloc, Manila
- MPD Station 5 (Ermita Police Station) - Ermita, Manila
- MPD Station 6 (Sta Ana Police Station) - Sta Ana, Manila
- MPD Station 7 (Abad Santos Police Station) - Jose Abad Santos, Manila
- MPD Station 8 (Sta Mesa Police Station) - Sta Mesa, Manila
- MPD Station 9 (Malate Police Station) - Malate, Manila
- MPD Station 10 (Pandacan Police Station) - Pandacan, Manila
- MPD Station 11 (MEISIC Police Station) - Meisic Street, Binondo, Manila
- MPD Station 12 (Delpan Police Station) - Delpan, Manila
- MPD Station 13 (BASECO Police Station) - BASECO, Port Area Manila
- MPD Station 14 (Barbosa Police Station) - Bautista St, Quiapo, Manila

== Criticism ==
The PNP in general, and the MPD in particular, is characterized as slow, unfit, trigger-happy and corrupt. Several policemen have been arrested for committing extortion against violators of the law (popularly known as "kotong," hence the term "kotong cop"). Police are also involved in shootouts, or using excessive force against suspects.

In 2010, a policeman was accused of torturing a suspect in a police precinct in Tondo. The officer who allegedly tortured the suspect was filed with administrative chargers That same year, following the resolution of the Manila hostage crisis which resulted in the death of eight tourists from Hong Kong, MPD chief Rolando Magtibay was sacked two days after the failed assault. His replacement, Senior Superintendent Francisco Villaroman, made acting head of the MPD, was replaced after one day. PNP did not comment on his removal. However, the Philippine Daily Inquirer said Villaroman was among police officers charged in the disappearance of two Hong Kong residents in the Philippines in 1998 and 1999. Villaroman said that the matter was heavily politicized, as it was linked to the affairs of the then at-large Senator Panfilo Lacson.

== Lists of chiefs ==
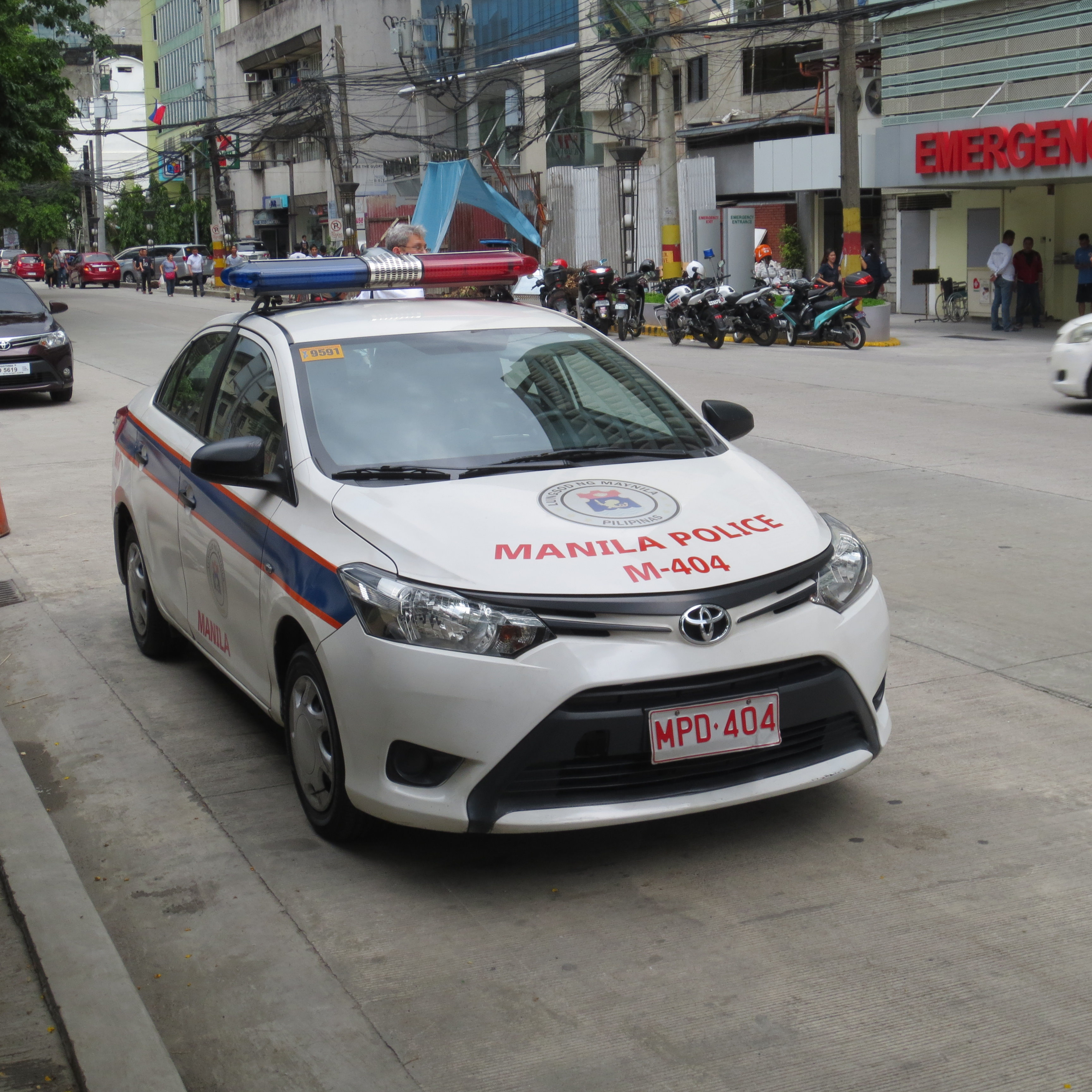
Toyota Vios of the Manila Police District.

| Name | Term | Notes |
|---|---|---|
From establishment to Commonwealth
| Gen. Arthur MacArthur Jr. | January 9 – July 31, 1901 | |
| Capt. George Curry | July 31, 1901 – 1902 | |
| Mathew Harmon | 1901 - 1903 | |
| Capt. John E. Harvin | 1903 – July 1910 | |
| John Fulton Green (acting) | July 1910 – 1911 | Acting |
| John E. Harding | 1911–1913 | |
| Capt. George H. Seaver | December 1, 1913 – June 16, 1918 | |
| Capt. Anton Hollmann | June 16, 1918 – January 9, 1920 | |
| Capt. Edwin C. Bopp | January 9, 1920 – March 20, 1922 | |
| Lt. Col. Gregorio M. Alcid (acting) | 1921–1922 | Acting |
| Col. John William Green, III | March 20, 1922 – March 2, 1929 | |
| Lt. Col. Gregorio M. Alcid (acting) | 1929 – 1930 | Acting |
| Col. Columbus E. Piatt | 1930 – March 1, 1936 | |
From Commonwealth to Western Police District
| Col. Antonio C. Torres | March 1, 1936 – January 1945 | |
| Col. Juan F. Dominguez | 1939 – 1940 | Acting |
| COL. Manuel S. Turingan SR. | 1940 - 1945 | |
| Marcus Ellis Jones | February 7, 1945 | |
| Col. Jeremiah P. Holland | May 1, 1945 – March 1946 | |
| Col. Angel M. Tuason | March – July 3, 1946 | |
| Col. Lamberto T. Javalera | July 12, 1946 – May 1947 | |
| Col. Manuel dela Fuente | May 1947 – January 1948 | |
| Col. Eduardo Quintos | January 12, 1948 – December 1 or 3, 1951 | First term |
| Col. Dionisio Ojeda | January 1952 – April 1953 | |
| Col. Cesar V. Lucero | April 10, 1953 - January 5, 1954 | |
| Col. Telesforo Tenorio | January 5, 1954 – May 10, 1962 | |
| Col. Napoleon D. Valeriano | October 27 – November 21, 1954 | |
| Gen. Marcos G. Soliman | May 10 – September 17, 1962 | |
| Brig. Gen. Eduardo Quintos | September 17, 1962 – April 7, 1965 | First chief to serve for the second term |
| Gen. Eugenio C. Torres | April 8, 1965 - May 24, 1966 | |
| Gen. Ricardo G. Papa | March 26, 1966 - March 13, 1968 | |
| Gen. Enrique V. Morales | March 14 – November 30, 1968 | |
| Gen. Gerardo G. Tamayo | November 30, 1968 - September 16, 1974 | |
As chief of the Western Police District
| BGen. James G. Barbers | September 17 – December 20, 1974 | Acting |
| BGen. James G. Barbers | December 20, 1974 – August 7, 1979 | As superintendent |
| Gen. Pedro F. de la Paz | August 8, 1979 – January 1, 1981 | |
| Gen. Narciso M. Cabrera | January 2, 1981 – May 1, 1986 | |
| P/Brig. Gen. Alfredo S. Lim | May 2, 1986 – December 21, 1989 | |
| Col. Hector M. Ciria Cruz | Sometime in the 1970s to late 1980s | Became Chief of Police (WPD), a close friend with Alfredo Lim |
| GEN. Ernesto Diokno | December 22, 1989 - August 7, 1992 | |
| P/CSUPT Oscar Aquino | August 7, 1992 - September 7, 1992 | |
| BRIG. GEN. Proceso D. Almando | September 7, 1992 - December 8, 1992 | |
| P/CSUPT Romeo O. Odi | December 8, 1992 - November 5, 1991 | |
| P/CSUPT Hermogenes Ebdane Jr. | November 5, 1993 - June 16, 1996 | |
| P/CSupt. Avelino Razon Jr. | June 11, 1996 – August 3, 1998 | First term |
| P/SSUPT Virtus Gil | August 3, 1998 - December 14, 1998 | |
| P/CSUPT Efren Fernandez | December 16, 1998 - December 20, 1999 | |
| P/CSupt. Avelino Razon Jr. | December 20, 1999 – March 15, 2001 | Second chief to serve for the second term |
| P/CSUPT Nicolas Pasinos JR | March 15, 2001 - July 29, 2002 | |
| P/CSUPT Pedro Bulaong | July 31, 2002 - August 1, 2006 | |
As chief of the Manila Police District
| P/SSUPT. Danilo Abarzosa | July 25, 2006 - September 24, 2007 | |
| PCSUPT Roberto Rosales | September 24, 2007 - April 1, 2009 | |
| PCSUPT Rodolfo Magtibay | April 1, 2009 - August 25, 2010 | Chief when the Manila Hostage Crisis happened |
| PSSUPT Francisco Villaroman (OIC) | August 25, 2010 | |
| PCSUPT Leocadio Santiago Jr. | August 27, 2010 | |
| PCSUPT Roberto P Rongavilla | August 28, 2010 - October 19, 2011 | |
| PCSUPT Alejandro Gutierrez | October 20, 2011 - April 5, 2013 | |
| PSSUPT Robert Po (OIC) | April 5, 2013 - July 1, 2013 | |
| PCSUPT Isagani Genabe Jr. | July 1, 2013 - January 26, 2014 | |
| PCSUPT Rolando E Asuncion | February 27, 2014 - October 8, 2014 | |
| PCSUPT Rolando Z. Nana | October 8, 2014 - June 30, 2016 | |
| PBGen Joel N Coronel | July 1, 2016 - May 31, 2018 | |
| PBGEN Rolando B. Anduyan | July 1, 2018 - November 7, 2018 | |
| Police BGen. Vicente Danao | November 18, 2018 - October 19, 2019 | Reassigned and promoted as regional director, PRO4A. |
| Police BGen. Bernabe M. Balba | October 20, 2019 - March 19, 2020 | Reassigned and promoted as regional director, PRO8. |
| Police BGen. Rolando F. Miranda | March 19, 2020 - December 1, 2020 | Reassigned and promoted as regional director, PRO6. |
| Police BGen. Leo M. Francisco | December 1, 2020 - August 8, 2022 | Reassigned and promoted as regional director, PRO6. |
| Police BGen. Andre P. Dizon | August 8, 2022 – October 16, 2023 | Current Acting Director of the Philippine National Police Academy |
| Police BGen. Arnold Thomas C. Ibay | October 17, 2023 – April 11, 2025 | Current Regional Director of the Police Regional Office-Negros Island Region (PRO-NIR) |
| Police BGen. Benigno L. Guzman | April 11, 2025 – July 14, 2025 | Current Acting Director of the PNP Police Security and Protection Group |
| Police BGen. Arnold E. Abad | July 14, 2025 –Present | |

== See also ==
- Philippine Constabulary
- Philippine National Police
- National Capital Region Police Office
  - Eastern Police District
  - Northern Police District
  - Quezon City Police District
  - Southern Police District
