= Camp Karingal =

Police headquarters in Quezon City, Philippines

Camp General Tomas B. Karingal
- Kampo Heneral Tomas B. Karingal
- Interactive map of the Camp General Tomas B. Karingal area

General information
- Location: Sikatuna Village, Quezon City, Philippines
- Coordinates: 14°38′17″N 121°03′47″E
- Current tenants: Quezon City Police District
- Named for: General Tomas B. Karingal
- Groundbreaking: 1974

Camp General Tomas B. Karingal is the district headquarters of the Quezon City Police District and is located in Sikatuna Village, Quezon City.

== Background ==
It was named after the assassinated chief of Northern Police District (NPD) Brigadier General Tomas B. Karingal. It was formerly used by the NPD when the Quezon City police still merged within it.

In 2020, due to 14 COVID cases, the camp was under lockdown.
