= National Capital Region Police Office =

Metro Manila regional unit of the Philippine National Police

Philippine National Police National Capital Region Police Office
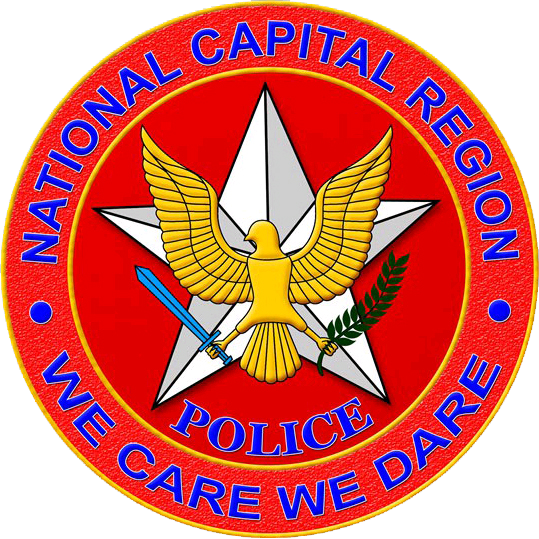
- Seal
- Abbreviation: PNP NCRPO
- Motto: We Care, We Dare

Agency overview
- Preceding agency: Philippine Constabulary Metropolitan Command

Jurisdictional structure
- Operations jurisdiction: Metro Manila, Philippines
- Map of Metro Manila showing the jurisdiction of the NCRPO's five police districts.
- General nature: Local civilian police

Operational structure
- Headquarters: Camp Bagong Diwa, Lower Bicutan, Taguig
- Agency executive: PBGEN Christopher Abrahano, Regional Director (OIC)
- Parent agency: Philippine National Police

Facilities
- Commands: 5 districts: Eastern Police District; Manila Police District; Northern Police District; Quezon City Police District; Southern Police District

Website
- ncrpo.pnp.gov.ph

The National Capital Region Police Office (NCRPO) is a regional unit of the Philippine National Police (PNP) that has jurisdiction over Metro Manila, also known as the National Capital Region. It is headquartered in Camp Bagong Diwa.

== History ==
=== As PC METROCOM ===
The Philippine National Police - National Capital Region Police Office (PNP NCRPO) was established as the Philippine Constabulary Metropolitan Command (PC METROCOM) on July 14, 1967, through Executive Order No. 76 of then President Ferdinand Marcos. It was founded as the Special Strike Force of Police Forces in the area which would later be known as Metro Manila. The establishment was a response to the increase of criminality in then existing four cities and thirteen municipalities in the area.

The METROCOM was tasked to conduct operations against threats to national security in the Metropolitan Manila area as well as support to the local police forces of the localities in their suppression and prevention of crime. The Metropolitan Police Force was later established on March 21, 1974, through Presidential Decree No. 421 issued by then-President Ferdinand Marcos. The decree consolidates the police, jail, and fire departments in the Metropolitan Manila area and placed them under the Commanding General of the METROCOM which served as head of the unit.

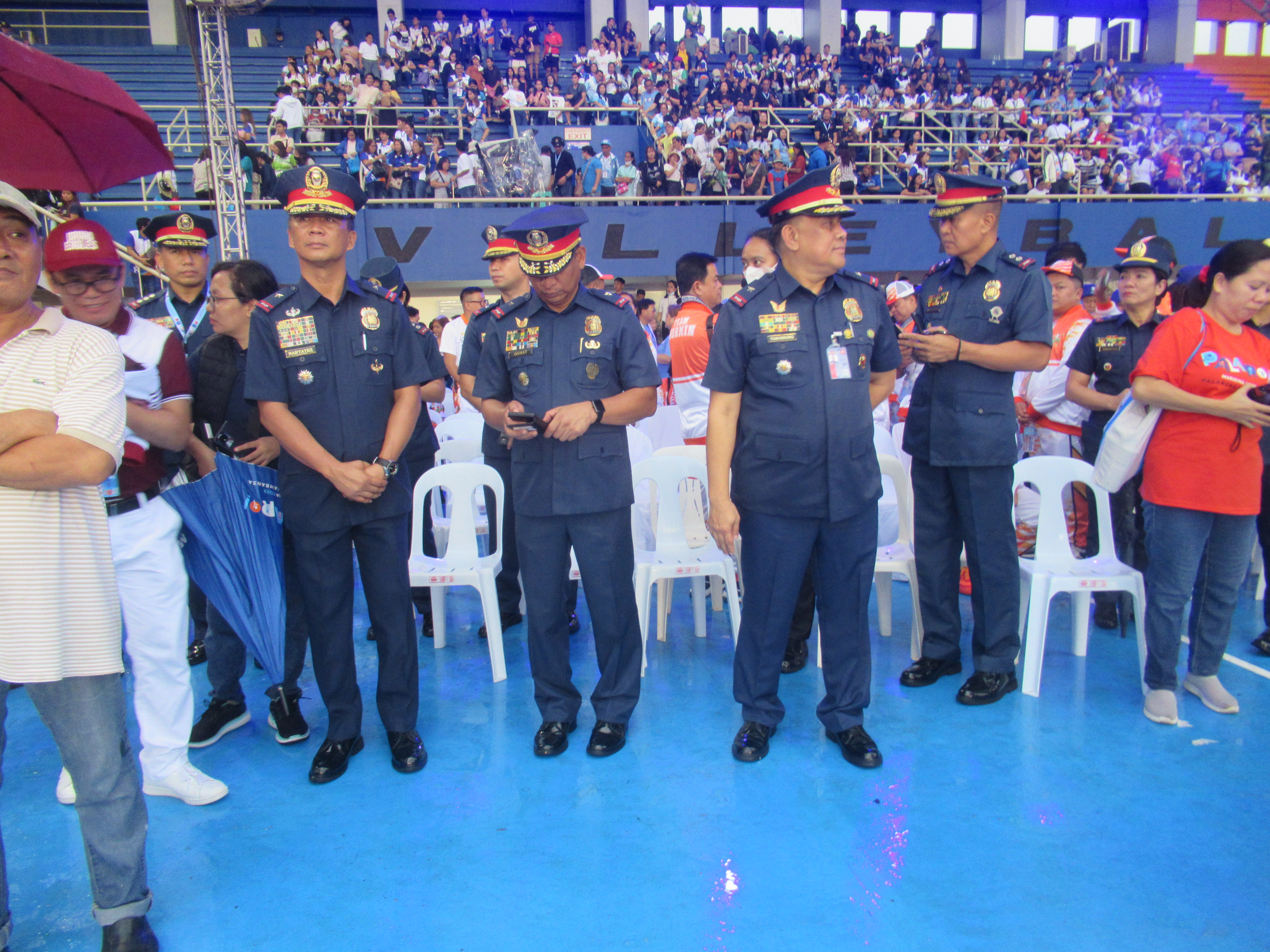
Jose Melencio C. Nartatez Jr.-Reynaldo M. Tamondong (2023 Palarong Pambansa)

=== As PC Capital Region Command ===
Following the People Power Revolution of February 1986 which ousted Marcos as president, the PC METROCOM was renamed as the Philippine Constubulary Capital Region Command (PC CAPCOM). The Philippine Constubulary (PC) itself would be abolished through Republic Act 6975, the Department of Interior and Local Government Act of 1990, passed by the 8th Philippine Congress and signed by then President Corazon Aquino in December 1990. The Philippine National Police (PNP) was established as in PC's place.

=== PNP CAPCOM ===
Under the Republic Act 6975, two regional offices were created for Metro Manila, North CAPCOM and South CAPCOM (consists of Manila, Makati, Pasay, Paranaque, Pateros, Muntinlupa, Las Pinas and Taguig). These offices were deactivated and reunified on April 12, 1993.

=== As CAPCOM, NCRC, and NCRPO ===
In 1993, the a unified command the PNP Capital Command (CAPCOM) was activated in place of the former South and North CAPCOM. The CAPCOM was renamed the National Capital Region Command (PNP NCRC) a year later. It was renamed again in June 31, 1996 to its current name, the PNP National Capital Region Police Office (PNP NCRPO) through NAPOLCOM Resolution No. 96-058.

== Divisions ==
=== District Offices ===
The PNP NCRPO has five police districts under it. Among the localities in Metro Manila, Manila and Quezon City are the only localities to have a dedicated police district.

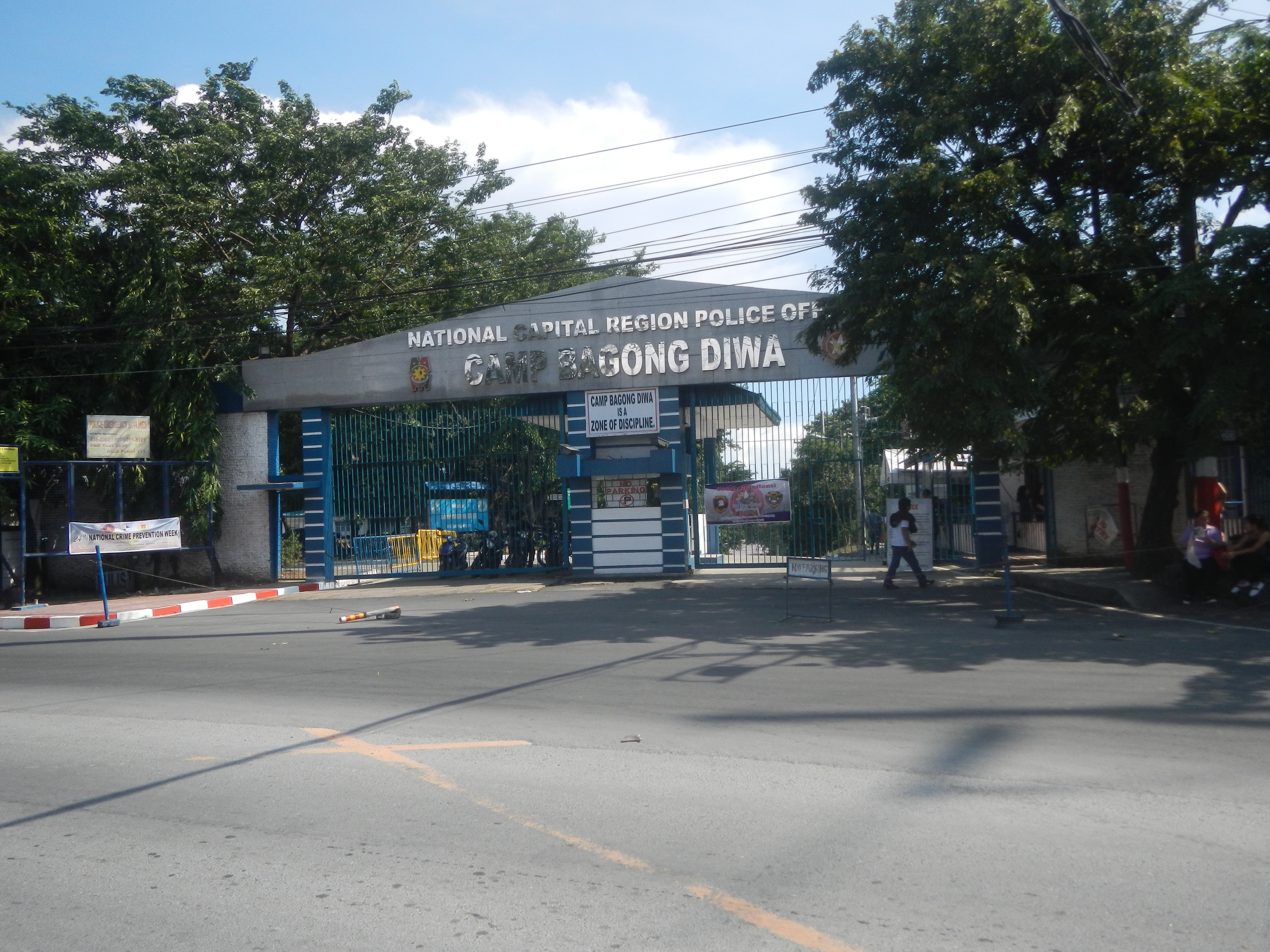
The gate of Camp Bagong Diwa, headquarters of the NCRPO

District	Jurisdiction
Eastern Police District (EPD)	Mandaluyong; Marikina; Pasig; San Juan
Manila Police District (MPD)	City of Manila
Northern Police District (NPD)	Caloocan; Malabon; Navotas; Valenzuela
Quezon City Police District (QCPD)	Quezon City
Southern Police District (SPD)	Las Piñas; Makati; Muntinlupa; Parañaque; Pateros; Pasay; Taguig

=== Regional Headquarters Command Group ===
- Office of the Regional Director
- Office of the Deputy Regional Director for Administration
- Office of the Deputy Regional Director for Operations
- Regional Directorial Staff
  - Secretary to the Directorial Staff
- Office of the Spokesperson

=== Regional Directorial Staff ===
- Regional Personnel and Records Management Division
- Regional Intelligence Division
- Regional Operations Division
- Regional Logistics and Research Development Division
- Regional Community Affairs and Development Division
- Regional Comptrollership Division
- Regional Investigation and Detective Management Division
- Regional Learning and Doctrine Development Division
- Regional Plans and Strategy Management Division
- Regional Information and Communications Technology Management Division
- Regional Public Information Office
- Regional Executive Senior Police Office
- Regional Mobile Force Battalion
- Regional Headquarters Support Unit
- Regional Personnel Holding and Accounting Unit
- Presidential PNP Security Force Unit

=== Support Units ===
- Regional Highway Patrol Unit, NCRPO
- Regional Forensic Unit, NCRPO
- Regional Criminal Investigation and Detection Unit, NCRPO
- Regional Special Operations Unit
- Regional Anti-Carnapping Unit
- Regional Drug Enforcement Unit
- Regional Complaints Referral and Monitoring Center
- Regional Special Operating Unit
- Regional Tactical Operations and Intelligence Center
- Regional Internal Affairs Service, NCRPO
- Regional Medical and Dental Unit, NCRPO
- Regional Finance Service Office 16, NCRPO
- Regional Chaplain Service, NCRPO
- Regional Communications and Electronics Unit, NCRPO
- Regional Engineering Unit, NCRPO
- Regional Legal Service, NCRPO
- Regional Special Training Unit, NCRPO
- Regional Aviation Security Unit, NCRPO
- Regional Maritime Unit, NCRPO
- NCR Training Center

== List of Regional Directors ==
Name	Term	Former Position	New Position
As Commanders of Capital Region Command (PNP CAPCOM, North and South)
Pedro Sistoza (North CAPCOM)	1991 – 1993		
Marino Filart (South CAPCOM)	1991 – 1992		
Oscar Aquino (South CAPCOM)	1992 – 1993		
Orlando Macaspac (South CAPCOM)	1993		
As Director of Capital Region Command (PNP CAPCOM)
Orlando Macaspac	April 13 – 25, 1993		
Pedro Sistoza	April 25, 1993 – 1994		
As Director of National Capital Region Command (PNP NCRC)
Pedro Sistoza	1994		
Recaredo Sarmiento II	January 2, 1994 – July 8, 1994	SAF commander (June 6, 1992 – January 2, 1994)	PNP Chief (July 8, 1994)
Jewel Canson	1994 – 1995		
Leandro Mendoza	1995 – 1996	Regional Command 4 (RECOM 4)	PNP Directorial Staff chief
As Director of the National Capital Region Police Office (NCRPO)
Hermogenes Ebdane	1996 – 1998		
Reynaldo Wycoco	1998–1999 (OIC)		
Edgar Aglipay	1999 – 2001		Promoted to 4-Star rank as Chief, PNP
Romeo Peña (Note: Served with the rank of Deputy Director General (3-star rank))	2001		Died in office
Edgar Galvante	2001 – 2002	Deputy chief for operations	Retired from the service
Reynaldo Velasco	2002 – 2003		Philippine Center for Transnational Crimes (PCTC)
Ricardo de Leon	2003 – 2004	Police Community Relations Directorate	Philippine Center for Transnational Crimes (PCTC)
Avelino Razon	2004 – 2005	PNP Head of the Directorate for Operations	Directorial Staff Chief
Vidal Querol	2005 – 2006	Northern Police District director from 2001 to 2002.	Retired from the service
Reynaldo Varilla	2006 – 2007	head of the PNP’s Directorate for Intelligence (DI)	
Geary Barias	2007 – 2008		
Leopoldo Bataoil	2008 – 2009		Retired from the service
Roberto Rosales	2009 – 2010	Chief of Manila Police District	
Leocadio Santiago Jr.	2010 – 2011		Dismissed
Nicanor Bartolome	2011		Directorial Staff Chief
Alan Purisima	May 11, 2011 – 2012	Regional Director, Police Regional Office 3 (PRO3)	Directorial Staff Chief
Leonardo Espina	September 6, 2012 – July 11, 2013	Director of the PNP Highway Patrol Group	Directorial Staff Chief
Marcelo Garbo	July 11, 2013 – December 11, 2013	Director of the Police Regional Office 7 (PRO 7)	
Carmelo Valmoria	December 11, 2013 – July 15, 2015		Retired from the service
Joel Pagdilao	July 29, 2015 – July 3, 2016	District Director, QCPD	Dismissed from the service
Oscar Albayalde	July 4, 2016 – April 19, 2018	Deputy Director, PNP Directorate for Plans	promoted to 4-star rank as PNP Chief
Camilo Cascolan	April 19, 2018 – June 1, 2018	Director, Directorate for Operations	reassign as Director for PNP Civil Security Group
Guillermo Eleazar	June 1, 2018 – October 16, 2019	Regional Director, Police Regional Office 4A	promoted as Chief of Directorial Staff
Debold Sinas	October 16, 2019 – November 10, 2020	Regional Director, Police Regional Office 7	promoted to 4-star rank as PNP Chief
Vicente Danao	November 10, 2020 – March 1, 2022	Regional Director, Police Regional Office 4A	promoted as Chief of Directorial Staff
Felipe R. Natividad	March 1, 2022 – August 8, 2022	Director, PNP Special Action Force	promoted as Commander of Area Police Command, Northern Luzon
Jonnel C. Estomo	August 8, 2022 – February 23, 2023	Regional Director, Police Regional Office 5	promoted as Deputy Chief for Operations
Edgar Allan O. Okubo	February 23, 2023 – July 7, 2023	Director, PNP Special Action Force	Assigned as Director, Directorate for Police Community Relations (DPCR)
Jose Melencio Nartatez	July 7, 2023 – October 9, 2024	Acting Director, Directorate for Intelligence	Promoted as PNP Deputy Chief for Administration
Sidney Hernia	October 9, 2024 – November 7, 2024	Director, PNP Anti-Cybercrime Group	Temporarily relived; Later assigned to the Southern Luzon Area Police Command
Reynaldo Tamondong (OIC)	November 7, 2024 – November 22, 2024	Deputy director, NCRPO	Returned to his old position for full time basis
Anthony Aberin	November 22, 2024 – August 23, 2026	Regional director, Police Regional Office 7	Retired from service
Christopher Abrahano (OIC)	August 23, 2026 – present	Regional director, Police Regional Office 10	

== Controversies ==
=== Mañanita during the COVID-19 pandemic ===
The holding of a mañanita for NCRPO's chief Debold Sinas amidst the COVID-19 pandemic in Metro Manila was criticized for breaching quarantine regulations. A mañanita is a customary celebration in the police where senior officers are greeted by their personnel in the early morning of their birthdays. The national police has filed charges against Sinas over the event, for violation of existing regulations on social distancing and mass gatherings though Sinas keeps his post due to "emergency situation" caused by the pandemic.

=== Extortion during POGO raids ===
In the season of raiding Philippine Offshore Gaming Operators (POGO), NCRPO director General Sidney Hernia with 14 other policemen and Anti-Cybercrime Group (ACG) director was accused of extortion. Jonvic Remulla, the DILG secretary confirmed that Hernia and ACG director was suspended temporarily. Deputy Chief Brigadier General Reynaldo Tamondong was assigned to be the acting chief. Hernia denied accusations.

=== Missing sabungeros ===
Former chief Joel Estomo was implicated in the 2021–2022 Luzon sabungero disappearances due to testimony by whistle-blower Julie Patidongan. Estomo denied the allegations.
