= Comprehensive Firearms and Ammunition Regulation Act =

2013 act in the Philippines

15th Congress of the Philippines
- Long title: An Act Providing for a Comprehensive Law on Firearms and Ammunition and Providing Penalties for Violations Thereof
- Citation: Republic Act No. 10591; Presidential Decree No. 1866 s. 1983
- Territorial extent: Philippines
- Enacted by: House of Representatives
- Enacted by: Senate
- Signed: May 29, 2013
- Effective: June 13, 2013

Legislative history

First chamber: House of Representatives
- Bill title: "An Act Providing for a Comprehensive Regulation of Firearms, Light Weapons and Ammunition, Penalizing Violations Thereof and Repealing for the Purpose Presidential Decree Numbered Eighteen Hundred Sixty-Six"
- Bill citation: House Bill No. 5484
- Introduced by: Rodolfo Biazon (Muntinlupa Lone District)
- Introduced: November 16, 2011
- First reading: November 21, 2011
- Second reading: December 13, 2011
- Third reading: January 24, 2012
- Committee report: House Committee on Public Order and Safety Report No. 1508

Second chamber: Senate
- Bill title: Same title as final law
- Bill citation: Senate Bill No. 3397
- Member(s) in charge: Gregorio Honasan
- First reading: January 29, 2013
- Second reading: January 30, 2013
- Third reading: February 4, 2013
- Committee report: Senate Committee on Public Order and Dangerous Drugs Report No. 701
- Conference committee bill passed by House of Representatives: February 5, 2013
- Conference committee bill passed by Senate: February 4, 2013

Repeals
- Presidential Decree No. 1866 s. 1983
- Status: In force

The Comprehensive Firearms and Ammunition Regulation Act, officially recorded as Republic Act No. 10591, is a consolidation of Senate Bill No. 3397 and House Bill No. 5484. It was enacted and passed by the Senate of the Philippines and the House of Representatives of the Philippines on February 4, 2013, and February 5, 2013, respectively. It was signed into law by President Benigno Aquino III on May 29, 2013.

This Act repealed Presidential Decree No. 1866, as amended, otherwise known as the "Codifying the Laws on Illegal/Unlawful Possession, Manufacture, Dealing In, Acquisition or Disposition, of Firearms, Ammunition or Explosives or Instruments Used in the Manufacture of Firearms, Ammunition or Explosives, and Imposing Stiffer Penalties for Certain Violations Thereof and for Relevant Purposes", dated June 29, 1983.

R.A. No. 10591 designated the Firearms and Explosives Office of the Philippine National Police as the implementing arm of the Department of the Interior and Local Government for firearms.

== History ==
The basis of Republic Act No. 10591 was to efficiently improve and provide stiffer penalties on illegal firearm acquisition and possession. Presidential Decree No. 1866, series of 1983, provided the Philippines its first ever firearms and explosives law though not all criminal activities where covered by the law. While laws such as P.D. No. 1866 regulated certain issues on the possession of firearms, it never addressed the issue of the registration, acquisition, manufacture, sale, distribution, and importation of firearms and ammunition.

The current Act is a culmination of House Bill No. 5484, introduced to the House of Representatives of the Philippines by its author Muntinlupa Representative Rodolfo Biazon and 10 other co-authors, and Senate Bill No. 3397, received and introduced to the Senate of the Philippines by its author Senator Gregorio Honasan and 6 other co-authors. Both bills passed the Senate and the House of Representatives on February 4, 2013, and February 5, 2013, respectively. The final version was received by President Benigno Aquino III on April 30, 2013 and signed into law on May 29, 2013.

On March 4, 2024, the Philippine National Police amended the Implementing Rules and Regulations of R.A. 10591, allowing civilians to own a semi-automatic rifle not more than 7.62 mm caliber. Oscar Jaime Florencio, however strongly objected: “Personally, I would not want to have our civilians be allowed to possess semi-automatic rifles or any rifles for that matter.”

== Enforcement ==
The law took effect on June 13, 2013, 15 days after it was signed by President Benigno Aquino III. The primary implementing agency is the Firearms and Explosives Office of the Philippine National Police.

=== Penal Provisions ===
Section 28, Article V of Republic Act No. 10591 provides for provision on the illegal acquisition and/or possession of firearms and ammunition as follows:

1. Penalty of prision mayor in its medium period for the illegal acquisition and/or possession of small arms;
2. Penalty of reclusion perpetua and reclusion temporal for the illegal acquisition and/or possession of three or more small arms or Class-A firearms;
3. Penalty of prision mayor in its maximum period for the illegal acquisition and/or possession of Class-A firearms;
4. Penalty of perpetual or temporary special disqualification for those who illegally possess firearms with a fitted and/or mounted loaded magazine, thermal weapon sight, laser sight, sniper scope, silencer, and converted to be capable of full automatic bursts;
5. Penalty of prision mayor in its minimum period for the illegal acquisition and/or possession of a major part of small arms;
6. Penalty of prision mayor in its minimum period for the illegal acquisition and/or possession of ammunition for small arms or Class-A firearms. If a person violates this same criminal charge, the criminal charges will combine and add up the prison sentence;
7. Penalty of prision mayor in its medium period for the illegal acquisition and/or possession of a major part of a Class-A firearm;
8. Penalty of prision mayor in its medium period for the illegal acquisition and/or possession of ammunition for Class-A firearms. If a person violates this same criminal charge, the criminal charges will combine and add up the prison sentence;
9. Penalty of prision mayor in its maximum period for the illegal acquisition and/or possession of a major part of a Class-B firearm; and
10. Penalty of prision mayor in its maximum period for the illegal acquisition and/or possession of ammunition for Class-B firearms. If a person violates this same criminal charge, the criminal charges will combine and add up the prison sentence.

Other provisions include:

1. Section 29 (Use of a Loose Firearm in the Commission of Crime);
2. Section 32 (Unlawful Manufacturing, Distribution, Sale, Importation, and/or Disposition of Firearms or Ammunition of Parts Thereof, Machinery, Tool or Instrument Used or Intended to be Used in the Manufacturing of Firearms, Ammunition or Parts Thereof);
3. Section 33 (Arms Smuggling);
4. Section 34 (Tampering, Obliteration or Alteration of Firearms Identification);
5. Section 35 (Use of an Imitation Firearm);
6. Section 37 (Confiscation and Forfeiture);
7. Section 38 (Liability for Planting Evidence);
8. Section 40 (Failure to Notify Lost or Stolen Firearms); and
9. Section 41 (Illegal Transfer/Registration of Firearms).

Charges range from 6 months to 20 years depending on the severity of the commissioned crime.

=== Classification of Firearms under R.A. No. 10591 ===
Class-A firearms include self-reloading pistols, carbines, rifles, submachine guns, assault rifles, and light machine guns that do not surpass 7.62MM cartridges while Class-B firearms include pistols, carbines, rifles, heavy machine guns, grenade launchers, portable anti-aircraft guns, portable anti-tank guns, recoilless rifles, portable systems of anti-tank missiles, anti-air missiles, rocket launchers, and mortars that surpass 7.62MM but do not surpass 100MM cartridges.

== See also ==
- Gun law in the Philippines
- Overview of gun laws by nation
