= Quezon City Police District =

PNP's police district in the Quezon City

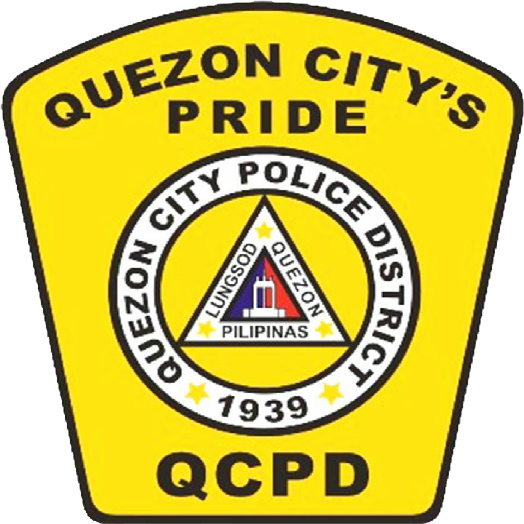
- Logo
- Common name: Quezon City Police District
- Abbreviation: QCPD
- Motto: Quezon City's Pride

Agency overview
- Formed: November 25, 1939
- Preceding agencies: Quezon City Police Department (1939–1975); Northern Police District (1975–1990); Central Police District Command (1990–2006)

Jurisdictional structure
- Operations jurisdiction: Quezon City, Metro Manila, PH

Operational structure
- Headquarters: Camp Tomas B. Karingal, Sikatuna Village, Quezon City
- Agency executives: PBGEN. Randy Glenn Silvio, District Director; PCOL. Joel Abalos Villanueva, Deputy District Director for Administration; PCOL. Robert D. Lingbawan, Acting Deputy District Director for Operation; PCOL. Julius B. Sagandoy, Chief District Directorial Staff
- Parent agency: National Capital Region Police Office

Facilities
- Stations: 16 police stations

Website
- ncrpo.pnp.gov.ph

The Quezon City Police District (QCPD) is a police district under the National Capital Region Police Office (NCRPO) of the Philippine National Police (PNP) that serves Quezon City as its law enforcement agency. Their headquarters is located at Camp Tomas Karingal.

== History ==
It was formed on November 25, 1939, as the Quezon City Police Department. It was merged with the CAMANAVA area and formed the Northern Police District (NPD). On November 6, 1990, the separation of Quezon City from NPD was implemented, leading to the creation of what was then the Central Police District. In 2005, the name was reverted to Quezon City Police District by the National Police Commission (NAPOLCOM). Then as in today, the QCPD arms is based on the official heraldic emblem of Quezon City.

== Lists of chiefs ==
The following list only started from the Central Police District Command list:

Name	Term	Notes
As chief of the Central Police District
BGen. Romeo San Diego	1990 – 1992	
BGen. Atty. Rodolfo M. Garcia	1992 – 1993	
P/CSUPT Diony A. Ventura	1993 – July 24, 1994	
P/CSUPT Ricardo De Leon	1994 – 1996	
P/CSUPT Hercules Cataluña	1996 – 1997	CPDC Director when Ozone Disco tragedy happened
P/SSUPT George L. Aliño	1997 – 1999	
P/SSUPT Romulo Sales	1999 – 2000	
P/CSUPT Victor Luga	2000 – 2001	
P/CSUPT Rodolfo Tor	2001 – 2002	
P/CSUPT Napoleon Castro	2002 – 2003	
P/SSUPT Oscar Mariñas	2003 – 2004	Acting
P/CSUPT Nicasio Radovan Jr.	2004 – 2006	
As chief of the Quezon City Police District
P/CSUPT Atty. Magtanggol Gatdula	2006 – 2009	
P/CSUPT Elmo San Diego	2009 – 2010	
P/CSUPT Benjardi Mantele	2010 – 2011	
P/CSUPT George Regis	2011 – 2012	
P/CSUPT Mario dela Vega	2012 – 2013	
P/CSUPT Richard Albano	2013 – 2014	
P/SSUPT Joel Pagdilao	2014 – 2015	
P/CSUPT Edgardo Tinio	2015 – July 1, 2016	
P/CSUPT Guillermo Tolentino Eleazar	July 1, 2016 – April 18, 2018	
PBGEN Joselito T. Esquivel	April 18, 2018 – September 17, 2019	
PBGEN Ronnie Montejo	September 17, 2019 – December 1, 2020	
PBGEN Danilo Macerin	December 1, 2020 – April 17, 2021	
PBGEN Antonio Yarra	April 17, 2021 – February 6, 2022	
PBGEN Remus Medina	February 6 – August 12, 2022	
PBGEN Nicolas Torre III	August 12, 2022 – August 31, 2023	Original choice was PCOL Jaysen de Guzman and Torre swapped with him
PBGEN Rederico Maranan	September 1, 2023 – October 2, 2024	Became PRO-3 director after tenure
PBGEN Melecio Buslig, Jr.	October 2, 2024 – April 21, 2025	Officially relieved as the District Director by the National Police Commission for failure to report incident against erring cop
PBGEN. Randy Glenn Silvio	February 9, 2026 - present	After the removal of Buslig, PBGEN. Randy Glenn Silvio became the Acting Director until he was promoted to his rank and role as the District Director

== Units ==
=== Headquarters ===
Under the Director, QCPD it has:

- Deputy District Director for Administration
- Deputy District Director for Operation
- Chief District Directorial Staff
- Secretary to Directorial Staff
- Office of the District Executive Senior Police Office

The administrative divisions are:

- District Personnel and Records Management Division
- District Logistic Division
- District Comptrollership Division

The operational divisions and units are:

- District Intelligence Division
- District Operation and Plans Division
- District Community Affairs and Development Division
- District Investigative and Detective Management Division
- District Drug Enforcement Unit
- District Headquarters Support Unit
- District Mobile Force Battalion
- District Traffic Enforcement Unit
- District Special Operation Unit
- Anti-Carnapping Unit
- District Tactical Motorized Unit

=== Stations ===
- Police Station 1 (La Loma)
- Police Station 2 (Masambong)
- Police Station 3 (Talipapa)
- Police Station 4 (Novaliches)
- Police Station 5 (Fairview)
- Police Station 6 (Batasan)
- Police Station 7 (Cubao)
- Police Station 8 (Project 4)
- Police Station 9 (Anonas)
- Police Station 10 (Kamuning)
- Police Station 11 (Galas)
- Police Station 12 (Eastwood)
- Police Station 13 (Bagong Silangan)
- Police Station 14 (Holy Spirit)
- Police Station 15 (Project 6)
- Police Station 16 (Pasong Putik)

== Controversies ==
=== ‘VIP’ Commonwealth video ===
A car driver accused of uploading a video on a social media platform when a QCPD officer stopping the traffic in the Commonwealth Avenue. The traffic, allegedly stopped for Vice President Sara Duterte. The uploader faced a complaint a law against fake news and Cybercrime Prevention Act. Chel Diokno, the lawyer of the uploader said that his client doesn't took the video and wasn't related or affiliated against the police. The news was viral on Twitter and caused the netizens anti- to the Vice President got mad on her. The officer was sacked, named Police Executive Master Sergeant Verdo Pantollano was also reinstated, by General Rederico Maranan.

=== Press conference for gun-toter ===
Wilfredo Gonzales, a retired PO1/Patrolman (demoted multiple times), and former QCPD officer was toted a gun against a cyclist in a road rage. In response, the QCPD Director General Nicolas Torre called a press conference in Camp Karingal, and Gonzales was also there, speaking for himself. The police unit, especially General Torre received backlash amid of favoring to the side of Gonzales. He ultimately resigned from his post after the controversy.

=== Uploading evidence ===
2 QCPD officers allegedly posted the video of evidence surrounding the death of Ronaldo Valdez, a veteran actor, which is illegal. The officers are now fired.

== See also ==
- National Capital Region Police Office
  - Eastern Police District
  - Manila Police District
  - Northern Police District
  - Southern Police District
