= Attempts to arrest Ronald dela Rosa =

Attempts to arrest the Philippine senator

- Part of the International Criminal Court investigation in the Philippines
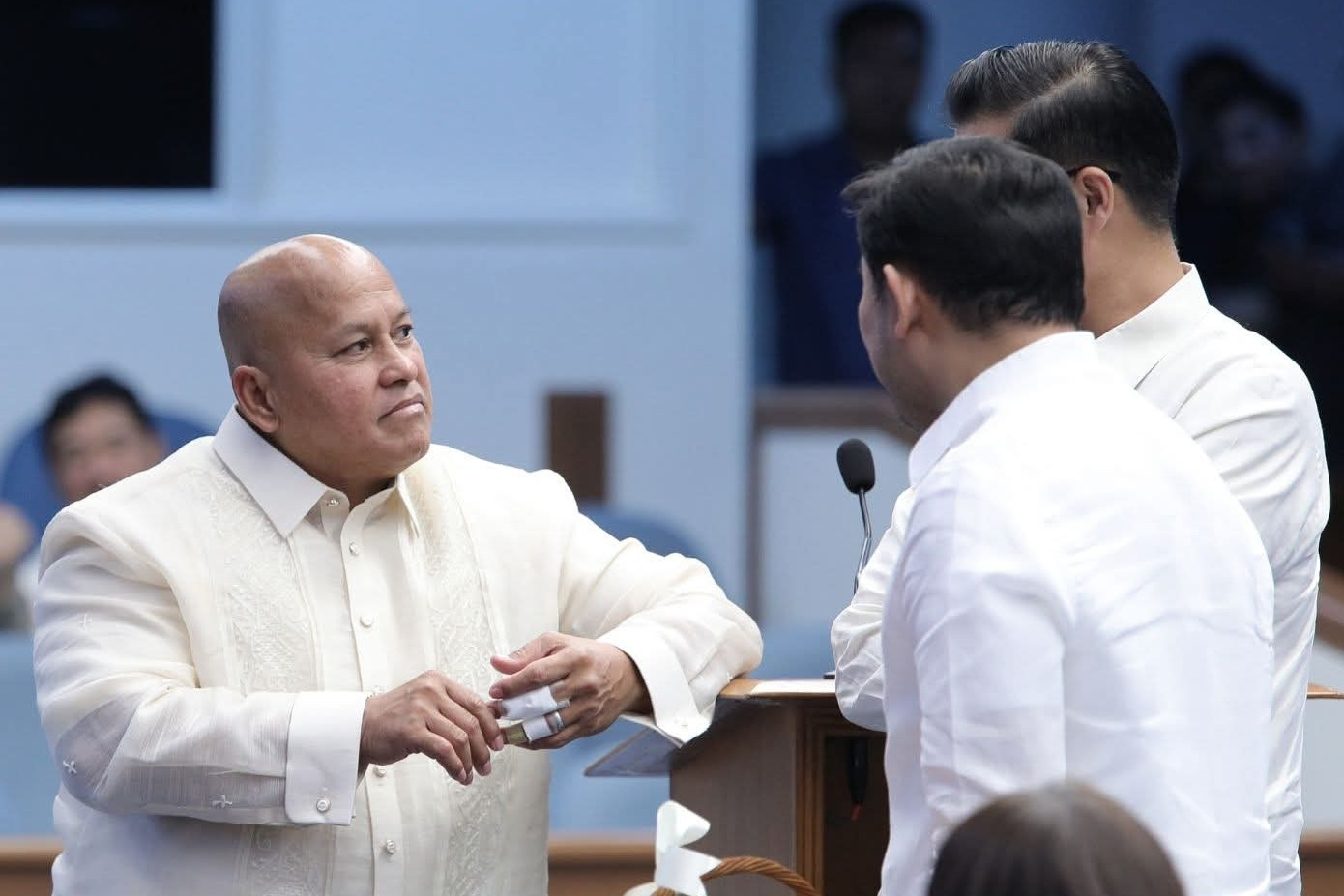
- Senator Ronald dela Rosa (left) speaking to other senators as he returned to the Senate with an injured hand on May 11, 2026, after a months-long absence since November 2025
- Date: May 11, 2026 – present
- Venue: Senate chamber, GSIS Building, Pasay, Philippines (May 11–13)
- Motive: Arrest of Ronald dela Rosa, who is the subject of an ICC arrest warrant
- Target: Ronald dela Rosa
- Outcome: Ronald dela Rosa leaves the Senate premises; ICC warrant remains active

Between May 11 and 13, 2026, attempts to arrest Senator Ronald dela Rosa, for whom the International Criminal Court (ICC) had issued an arrest warrant on charges of crimes against humanity related to the Philippine drug war, caused disorder in the Senate of the Philippines following his sudden return, during which he was involved in a chase with agents of the National Bureau of Investigation (NBI) who had entered the Senate chamber to serve the warrant.

On May 13, tensions escalated when gunfire was heard inside the GSIS Building, where the Senate meets, during dela Rosa's evasion of arrest, coinciding with the transmission of the articles of impeachment against Sara Duterte to the Senate in the presence of the media. The Senate was subsequently placed on lockdown. Most of the gunfire consisted of warning shots fired by members of the Office of the Sergeant-at-Arms (OSAA), the Senate's security office, led by Mao Aplasca, after alleged NBI agents entered the premises. No casualties were reported during the incident. In the early hours of the following morning, dela Rosa left the Senate premises with Senator Robin Padilla and retired colonel Jean Alia Robles, Padilla's deputy chief of staff, and was driven to Makati.

NBI director Melvin Matibag denied the presence of NBI agents inside the Senate premises, stating that 18 NBI agents were stationed at the GSIS compound solely at the request of the director of the Government Service Insurance System (GSIS) to secure the premises outside the Senate. He added that an NBI agent was "forced" to fire six warning shots from outside the building after the initial shots fired by the OSAA. Investigations into the incident by several agencies are ongoing. The May 13 shooting incident has been described as both "embarrassing" and a "national disgrace" because of the unprecedented violence at a democratic institution and the Senate's alleged obstruction in protecting a fugitive from international law.

== Background ==
On October 3, 2024, Senator Ronald dela Rosa filed his candidacy for the 2025 Philippine Senate elections under the Duterte-led Partido Demokratiko Pilipino (PDP). Following the former president Rodrigo Duterte's arrest, dela Rosa declared he is willing to join Duterte in The Hague if all legal remedies are exhausted. However, Dela Rosa went to an undisclosed location within the Philippines. He has considered hiding from authorities. He was re-elected as senator in May 2025, placing third in the official results, with 20,773,946 of votes.

On November 11, 2025, Ombudsman Jesus Crispin Remulla disclosed that he had received an "unofficial" copy of an ICC arrest warrant against dela Rosa for alleged crimes against humanity in connection with the Philippine drug war during the administration of Rodrigo Duterte. Dela Rosa's ally and former president Rodrigo Duterte had been detained in The Hague since 2025 while awaiting trial on charges of crimes against humanity. On February 13, 2026, the ICC identified dela Rosa and seven others as indirect co-perpetrators in Duterte's alleged crimes against humanity. On May 9, 2026, the ICC denied reports in Philippine media claiming that it had publicly issued an arrest warrant against dela Rosa. By then, dela Rosa had been absent from the Senate since November 11, 2025.

== Prior events ==
=== Return of dela Rosa and Senate leadership election ===
Footage of Ronald dela Rosa being pursued by NBI agents on May 11, 2026

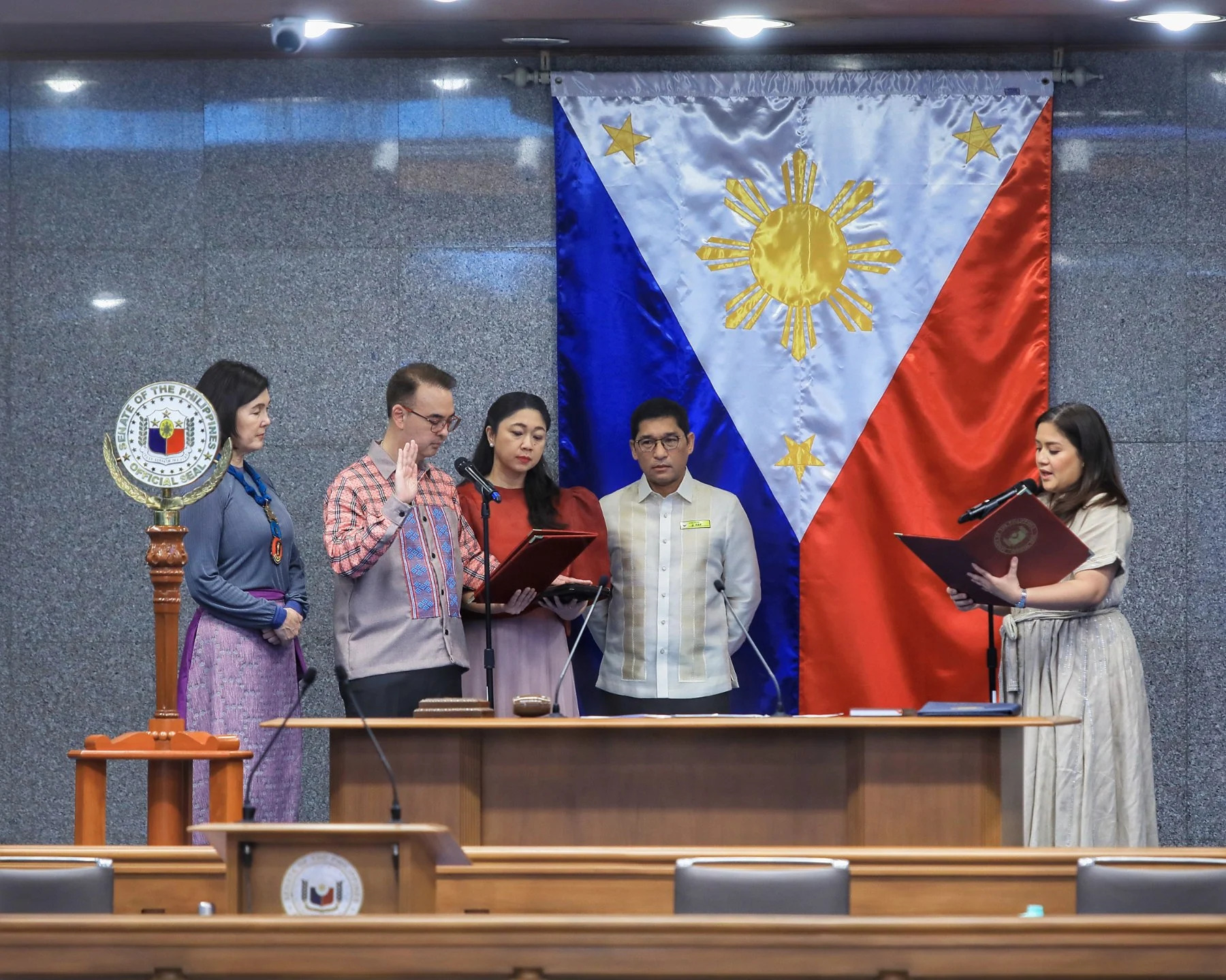
Senator Alan Peter Cayetano taking his oath as the new Senate president

On May 11, 2026, dela Rosa suddenly showed up at the Senate session, his first attendance since November 2025, to participate in the May 2026 President of the Senate of the Philippines election, in which incumbent Senate president Tito Sotto was defeated by Senate minority leader Alan Peter Cayetano. Thirteen senators supported his candidacy, including dela Rosa; nine supported maintaining Sotto as president; and two abstained, leading Cayetano to win the presidency. Former Senator Antonio Trillanes and agents of the National Bureau of Investigation (NBI) also came to the Senate to implement the ICC warrant against dela Rosa. Dela Rosa claimed that there were NBI agents trying to stop him from entering the ongoing session. "When I am absent, you look for me. Now, I am showing you here: I was blocked by the NBI, they wrestled me, and I ended up with these wounds. This is the Senate. They have no respect for the institution of the Senate. Why is the NBI like that?", dela Rosa told reporters. He said that he sustained scratches on his hands and wrestled with the agents. CCTV footage revealed that dela Rosa was running away from NBI agents as he entered the Senate building, but he had not wrestled with them, with dela Rosa later admitting that his hands were injured from tripping on a stairwell. During the session, Cayetano said that "no senator was allowed to be arrested ever in Senate premises," which was proven false by The Philippine Star.

Initially, dela Rosa was walking to the session hall, but when he noticed someone pursuing him, he started to run. Dela Rosa said that the NBI blocked him from going up, so he evaded them and ran up the stairs. According to NBI Director Melvin Matibag, two female NBI agents were serving the warrant to dela Rosa at the basement entrance of the Senate when dela Rosa pushed them to evade arrest, with the two giving chase to the senator in the building; dela Rosa later admitted that he did not see any handcuffs when the two agents approached him. In an opinion piece, Herbie Gomez of Rappler reported that dela Rosa "charged toward the Senate session hall in visible panic, scrambling up the staircase with such desperation that his aides could barely keep up." On the staircase, he stumbled and came close to hitting his head on the concrete. The Senate then gave Senate protection to dela Rosa from the ICC, despite contestation from former Senator Franklin Drilon, commenting, "[t]here is no law which says that a senator can be protected or exempt from a warrant of arrest." Trillanes in the session showed reporters an ICC warrant for dela Rosa, the first page having the words "secret" and an image of dela Rosa. Trillanes added that he accompanied the NBI agents, stating, "we will not let Bato leave." It was later confirmed that the ICC had, in fact, issued a warrant of arrest against dela Rosa. Interior and Local Government Secretary Jonvic Remulla said that the document Trillanes was holding was a correspondence from the ICC to the Philippine Center on Transnational Crime, but he added that, since they were not part of the treaty, local police could not enforce a warrant to dela Rosa unless it was coursed through Interpol. Dela Rosa ended up staying in the office at the senate that night, and the Senate was placed under lockdown, with barbed wire placed at the entrances.

Regarding how dela Rosa entered the Senate, Senator Panfilo Lacson claimed in a May 13, 2026 interview with DZBB that dela Rosa had arrived at the chamber using a vehicle linked to Senator Pia Cayetano. Lacson stated that, according to his information, only two senators were aware of dela Rosa's return and that he had reportedly ridden in Cayetano's vehicle before entering the Senate complex. Later, dela Rosa, in a separate interview with Balitanghali, said only Senator Alan Peter Cayetano was aware that he would arrive. He also said he did not know who owned the vehicle he rode in going to the Senate. Thereafter, during the Senate plenary session, Senator Pia Cayetano denied Senator Lacson's earlier remarks. She said that "Senator dela Rosa did not ride in my vehicle, nor did I have anything to do with facilitating his presence in the Senate last Monday". Senate President Alan Peter Cayetano then clarified that dela Rosa did not ride in Senator Pia Cayetano's vehicle but instead entered the Senate using his vehicle.

=== May 12 ===
On May 12, 2026, Senators Sotto, Risa Hontiveros, Panfilo Lacson, Kiko Pangilinan, and Bam Aquino filed a resolution urging dela Rosa to surrender to the ICC, stating that accountability should not regard rank and instead be equal to all politicians and that the Senate could not provide "protective custody" from "lawful arrest." Alan Peter Cayetano defended dela Rosa and rejected their resolution. In the Senate session, Sotto said that he told the NBI agents when dela Rosa came to the Senate that they were to coordinate with the Office of the Sergeant-at-Arms (OSAA) as they "know the rules"; he also expected dela Rosa to have a different perspective. He then denied his involvement in the NBI chase for dela Rosa, denying allegations that he coordinated with the NBI and let them inside the building. In a radio interview, Lacson confirmed that dela Rosa was effectively contained in the Senate chamber. Dela Rosa appealed to President Bongbong Marcos not to enforce an ICC warrant against him and send him to The Hague, urging supporters and military personnel to stand behind him and to not accept his possible extradition. Malacañang eventually replied to his request, saying "[h]e's entitled to rights if arrest happens." Dela Rosa's legal counsel requested the Supreme Court to issue a Temporary Restraining Order against the possible arrest while supporters of dela Rosa and Duterte organized prayer vigils and demonstrations outside the Senate complex.

Pangilinan, then chair of the Committee on Agriculture and Food, scheduled a meeting with farmers from Benguet for May 12 to discuss rising fuel prices, but the loss of his seat and the change of Senate leadership led to the cancellation of the meeting. Hontiveros also lost her chairmanships of the Senate committees on Women, Health, and Electoral Reforms, which led to the disruption of multiple bills she sponsored. Pangilinan and Cayetano then debated over Senate rules on committee leadership; Pangilinan proposed suspending the rules with voting to allow people with former posts to continue working through the week, but Cayetano argued that Section 19 of the Senate rules stated they "shall cease when their successors shall have been elected or designated." The debate turned lengthy, with former Senate President Francis Escudero siding with Cayetano and Lacson offering a compromise. The only person to obtain a chairmanship was dela Rosa, who was assigned the chair of the Committee on Public Order and Dangerous Drugs.

== Lockdown and shooting in the Senate ==
=== Lockdown ===
Ronald dela Rosa pleads for help in a Facebook livestream on May 13, 2026, at 17:23 PHT.

On May 13, 2026, at 16:00 PHT, dela Rosa sang parts of the Philippine Military Academy hymn as an appeal for "peaceful support" to his former colleagues, rejecting calls for surrender. Hours later, the Supreme Court of the Philippines did not accept a request by dela Rosa for a halt order against his arrest and did not accept a temporary restraining order for him. Eventually, dela Rosa was included in the ICC wanted list, with the website listing him "at-large". Mid-session, dela Rosa had abruptly left the plenary hall and told his supporters minutes later to hold a prayer vigil for him and reported that he was going to be arrested by NBI agents in a Facebook live video at 18:23 PHT.

By the evening, more than 10 armed military personnel wearing camouflage uniforms arrived at the Philippine Senate building. Witnesses saw numerous men with rifles and helmets talking with the Senate security team near the elevator. The Senate OSAA told members of the media that it would go on lockdown again at 19:06 PHT and gave them five minutes to voluntarily vacate the building. Meanwhile, journalists asked for the reason on ordering the lockdown and if police will enforce the warrant, to which senate staff did not reply. At 19:17 PHT, reporters rushed to the ground floor from the second floor after seeing dela Rosa take the elevator, but Senate staff blocked the elevator. By then, when the elevator opened, dela Rosa was not present. Some select journalists from Rappler, ABS-CBN, and TV5 took the elevator to the fifth floor at 19:19 PHT, where the Senate offices are located, but when they arrived, Senate staff prevented them from entering the fifth floor. The minute after, Senate security pulled down a metal gate at the main building, preventing anyone from exiting the building. At 19:25 PHT, more marines entered the building with rifles. Some journalists at the ground floor heard a drilling sound behind a metal door at 19:33 PHT. 11 minutes later, marines stormed the right wing of the building, cocking their rifles. While journalists attempted to follow the armed personnel, Senate security only let them watch from a distance. Reporters and members of the media saw police and military personnel lined up in the hallways. At 19:46 PHT, Remulla reported armed men attempting to enter the building, but the Senate OSAA stopped them.

=== Shooting ===
At 19:45 PHT, gunfire erupted at the Senate within earshot of the media. TV5 was broadcasting the primetime newscast Frontline Pilipinas with a live feed from the Senate when the first gunshot was heard and was broadcast live across the country. ABS-CBN's TV Patrol and GMA's 24 Oras were in a commercial break at the time before returning to their programs to record the other gunshots. The Philippine Star and the Philippine Daily Inquirer reported at least five gunshots in the Senate building while Philippine National Police chief Melencio Nartatez reported 30 shots, with the OSAA and Remulla telling journalists that the shots fired were warning shots against the armed men attempting to enter the building. The Malacañang Palace said that SAA and retired police major Mao Aplasca fired the first warning shot, leading a volunteer driver, Mel Oragon of the NBI to fire back. It was found out that the NBI was deployed to Government Service Insurance System (GSIS) premises, which the Senate leases, by the request of GSIS President Wick Veloso. At the time, the 13 majority Senators, including dela Rosa, were holding a caucus deciding the transmittal of the Articles of Impeachment against Duterte. Senate security told reporters to take shelter at the Public Relations and Information Bureau office while other journalists evacuated the building through the ground floor exit, the lights going out while they ran. Senate staff opened the metal gate to help reporters leave. Shortly after, Senator Robin Padilla rushed up the stairs while telling journalists to leave the area.

Maila Ager and Tina Santos of the Cebu Daily News speculated that the shots came from automatic weapons. People could be heard screaming in the building as the gunfire, which lasted for three minutes, continued. A reporter for DZMM said some cameramen and journalists were hurt while escaping due to their tripods toppling. Senator Imee Marcos said that an NBI confidential agent was arrested after receiving a tactical bag on the stairs of the Senate second floor. According to Marcos, the agent said that his boss "Atty. Bomediano" was the one who ordered dela Rosa's arrest. At 19:57 PHT, the articles of impeachment against Sara Duterte were wheeled inside the Senate. Zyann Ambrosio, while reporting for ABS-CBN, could be heard crying on the line, leading to anchor Alvin Elchico telling her to prioritize her safety. Victoria Tulad and Arles Delos Santos gave live reports in the Senate for ABS-CBN and One News, respectively. Al Jazeera's Jamela Aisha Alindogan and DZXL's Conde Batac said covering the skirmish was a first for them; Robert Mano of DZMM shared a picture with other reporters; GMA News anchor Bam Alegre was thankful for his survival skills, while Manila Standard's Joshua Isaac Español said it was one of the longest nights he ever had. During the shooting, the ABS-CBN Newsroom "buzzed with tense activity" according to Cecile Baltazar of Philstar Life.

=== Livestreams and aftermath ===
The Facebook Live of Alan Peter Cayetano, stating that the Senate was "allegedly under attack", was streamed on May 13, 2026, at 20:06 PHT.

Cayetano reported that the Senate was "allegedly under attack" in a Facebook livestream at 20:01 PHT, stating, "We have to turn off the lights dahil may putukan na nangyayari [because there is a shooting happening]." Senator Jinggoy Estrada informed the public through the livestream of the events happening in the Senate building. In the same livestream, Cayetano reported that officials were locked in their rooms, but he and other senators in the same room as him agreed not to leave the premises and dela Rosa. He also reported that more than 200 people gathered outside the complex. Senator Imee Marcos posted a Facebook video questioning the Senate shootout. When NBI director Melvin Matibag was talking online to Senator Loren Legarda, Senator Pia Cayetano allegedly asked Matibag what he would do to ensure their safety, to which he responded by telling her not to shout at him. Alan Peter Cayetano accused Matibag for not ensuring their safety. Sotto reported that his vehicle was attacked by protesters, stating, "The barbaric protesters banged my vehicle repeatedly, threw bottles, and cursed foul remarks [...] I am furious and disappointed with the PNP and other security personnel assigned outside the Senate for failing to control the rowdy and unruly crowd." Senator Bong Go called for prayer, according to the Cebu Daily News. The Senate was placed under lockdown once more as shots were heard inside the senate. Dela Rosa then became wanted by the ICC.

A member of the OSAA reported drilling noises from Senate doors connected to the GSIS parking lot. At 20:27 PHT, Remulla arrived to the building and said, "I am not here to arrest Senator Bato [...] I am here to secure everyone." Three minutes later, Go went live on Facebook to give updates. At 20:39 PHT, Matibag said that NBI agents were at the Sequoia Hotel Manila Bay in Parañaque for a workshop and planning event and to honor an agreement with Alan Peter Cayetano as more police personnel arrive to the compound. In a TV interview, PNP chief Jose Melencio Nartatez confirmed that PNP personnel were on the scene but did not fire the shots. Senator Mark Villar said in a livestream that he and other senators were trapped in the building, but said that he and his sister, Camille Villar, was safe. At 20:54 PHT, Senate personnel opened the main gate and allowed remaining reporters to leave. Go went live a minute later, showing Remulla talking to Cayetano in the background in the same room as Senator Rodante Marcoleta, Senator Joel Villanueva, Mark and Camille Villar, Legarda, and Pia Cayetano. By 21:00 PHT, most of the lights were out while cops and military personnel occupied the second floor. OSAA head said that he would not let anybody arrest dela Rosa on Senate premises, while former Senator and incumbent Mamamayang Liberal representative Leila de Lima told dela Rosa to voluntarily surrender to authorities. Nartatez arrived at the compound and entered the Senate building at 21:04 PHT, declining to answer questions from reporters. At 21:26 PHT, all senators were confirmed to be okay with dela Rosa remaining safe in the Senate complex safe; he was planned to talk to Remulla. Former PNP chief Nicolas Torre said that dela Rosa's arrest was not "political revenge" but "law enforcement". Nartatez denied that the gunshots heard inside the Senate building originated from the police side. At 21:35 PHT, both Cayetanos and Villars, Villanueva, and Marcos left the building, with Remulla stating that authorities were investigating the matter, adding that the first warning shot was fired by a member of the OSAA. He also said that he was not here to arrest dela Rosa but received orders from the president to secure the senators.

Philippine President Bongbong Marcos's statement on the shooting, posted to Facebook on May 13, 2026, at 22:21 PHT.

Senate Secretary Mark Llandro Mendoza later confirmed that no casualties were reported during the incident. As of that evening, authorities had not identified who fired the gunshots or explained what caused the incident. President Bongbong Marcos said it was not the government that caused the shooting in a call with Alan Peter Cayetano. The President later added in a statement, posted on Facebook at 22:21 PHT, that he did not order the NBI or any other government agency to conduct the shooting, and the police and marines present at the time of the shooting were simply there to secure the Senate during the proceedings. He also stated in the same video that additional investigations will be made to find the true perpetrator. A video was sent by a person named "Alvin Go" to ABS-CBN News showing dela Rosa still in the building as of 23:00 PHT, and his lawyer confirmed his client was in the building 13 minutes later.

== Escape and search for Ronald dela Rosa ==
=== May 14 ===
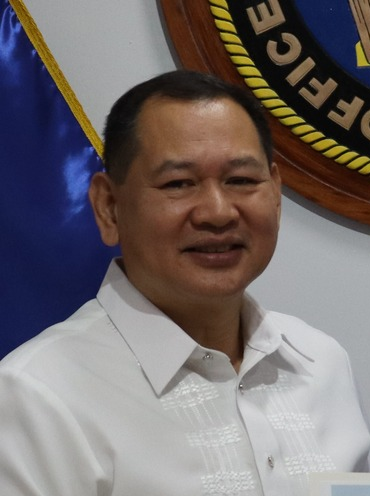
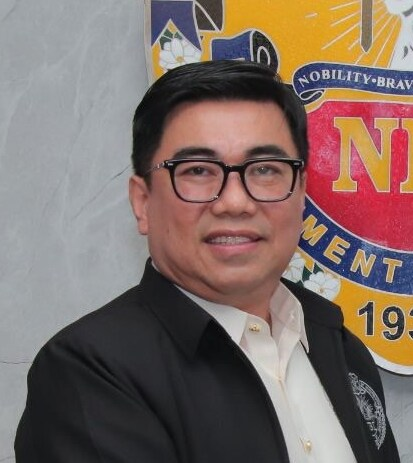
Senate Sergeant-at-Arms Mao Aplasca (left) and NBI Director Melvin Matibag (right)

A photo of dela Rosa with his legal counsel Israelito Torreon was posted showing them in the Senate at 01:11 PHT. Other sources tipped the Philippine Daily Inquirer that dela Rosa had already escaped the building.

After dela Rosa and his allies claimed the ICC was a "foreign court", common drug war victims counsel Gilbert Andres said that it was an "international court established by the community of states because they don't want impunity for perpetrators of international crimes." At 09:30 PHT, a planned Malacañang Palace press conference was cancelled. Reports surfaced that NBI driver Mel Oragon was arrested by the Southern Police District as the suspect arrested in the shooting at Wednesday night. At the same time, another one of dela Rosa's legal counsels, Jimmy Bondoc, reported that he was still there as of early morning, stating, "I will give you based on my personal knowledge that he's still in the Senate. But, since I'm still here outside, I cannot check. But, as of last night, he's there. We're talking. I left early morning." Armed Forces of the Philippines (AFP) chief Romeo Brawner Jr. said that the marines deployed in the Senate did not fire any shots, attributing the gunfire to the OSAA.

The Senate secretariat, through information from a senator who requested to remain anonymous, said that dela Rosa was no longer inside Senate premises, reportedly leaving at 02:30 PHT, as per an SMS exchange at 10:29 PHT. The NBI eventually verified reports of him leaving the building, but the PNP still said he was in the building as of 09:00 PHT. ABS-CBN later posted footage of an apparent convoy, with a black van and a white SUV leaving the Senate complex around 3:00 PHT, which is the only time any vehicle was seen exiting the area that closely lined up with the time reported by the anonymous senator.

Senator Risa Hontiveros reported at 11:24 PHT that minority senators were not there during the shooting because they immediately went home after the session; she also told dela Rosa to surrender to authorities. Bureau of Immigration spokesperson Dana Sandoval said at 12:30 PHT there was no report of dela Rosa leaving the Philippines after he left Senate premises. Palace Press Officer Undersecretary Claire Castro also stated in a press conference at 12:37 PHT that Mao Aplasca, the currently acting Sergeant-at-Arms of the Senate of the Philippines, fired a "warning shot" at an NBI agent on the bridge connecting the GSIS Complex to the Senate Building, which prompted an exchange of gunfire. This NBI agent was reportedly tasked to protect the GSIS premises at the management's request, due to the high security situation in the Senate prior to the shooting.

The Philippine Star spotted dela Rosa with an online status in Viber at 12:46 PHT. At 13:44 PHT, Senator Win Gatchalian called on Senate leaders and the Sergeant-at-Arms to immediately address and clarify reports that dela Rosa may have departed the Senate compound. The Senate secretariat was ordered to include the articles of impeachment against Duterte in the Senate calendar on Monday, Cayetano said in a press conference; he also said that the minority bloc was reportedly busy telling other senators to join them and form another majority for an alleged coup. He vowed transparency on the escape and said he was awaiting reports from the Department of the Interior and Local Government (DILG) and Senate security officials for the reported security incident in the complex and reports on dela Rosa. At noon, the Malacañang Palace held a press briefing with Nartatez and Malabag. In the briefing, they were asked if the events were staged, a popular theory online. Malabag did not want to make conclusions, but included it in the investigation, with Nartatez adding that the PNP have identified 20 people there and would match their statements with evidence. Cayetano then ordered Aplasca to check if dela Rosa had left the building.

Later, Senate President Alan Peter Cayetano confirmed dela Rosa is no longer in the Senate complex, saying dela Rosa left the Senate with Senator Robin Padilla for "everyone's safety". He is also no longer under the protective custody of the Senate after he "voluntarily" left the Senate early in the morning, Cayetano added. A Senate secretariat said dela Rosa left the building at 02:30 PHT. This confirmation followed earlier reports from Palace Press Officer Claire Castro, who said that, based on their sources, dela Rosa was no longer inside the Senate premises; however, this was still pending verification at the time. The Senate President also revealed that he had been in contact with dela Rosa's wife Nancy, who expressed her gratitude to him and other senators for all the support they had extended to dela Rosa. In a text message, she also said "I'd also like to ask for forgiveness for all the confusion and havoc it has created in the Senate. It is for this reason I am sure that Ronald made his escape." Members of the House minority condemned dela Rosa's escape, saying the Senate's decision to place him under protective custody was a tool enabling him to evade authorities. Mamamayang Liberal Representative Leila de Lima and the NBI both then called on the Senate to explain how dela Rosa managed to leave the Senate premises despite being placed under protective custody. Cayetano, however, defended dela Rosa's departure from the Senate, arguing there was "nothing illegal" about dela Rosa leaving the building. He also said that dela Rosa did not escape but rather chose to leave because no local arrest warrant has been issued against him. Additionally, Cayetano said he was informed by Estrada around noon earlier that dela Rosa was no longer inside the Senate building and clarified that he was unsure whether dela Rosa and Padilla left together or both just happened to leave the premises separately.

As for who made the first shot, acting sergeant-at-arms Mao Aplasca said that while they had been receiving reports of armed individuals at the Senate premises all day, they confirmed their presence during the evening. They asked for them to identify themselves, with they replying that they were from the NBI. Aplasca admitted that his men fired the first shot, a warning shot; the NBI agents then replied with gunshots of their own, necessitating an exchange of gunfire. Aplasca also said that they asked the other side to disarm themselves, but they raised their guns instead. Cayetano said that the OSAA fired 27 shots, while "the other side" fired five.

The NBI maintained their men were restricted to the GSIS part of the compound, were invited by the GSIS, that there was no assault on the Senate part of the compound, and that there was no plan to arrest dela Rosa. They later said that they and the police will investigate if the ruckus was staged. It was also reported that prior to the gunfire incident, the GSIS sent a letter to the NBI requesting assistance in securing everyone on the premises. The GSIS President and General Manager Wick Veloso asked the NBI Director Matibag to deploy personnel to the compound, where the Senate is located. In a Palace press briefing earlier, Matibag said the NBI had already been in verbal communication with the GSIS regarding the request before formally receiving the letter at around 17:00 PHT yesterday. The NBI agents arrived at the premises about an hour later.

=== May 15 ===
The Senate Sergeant-at-Arms Mao Aplasca was placed under preventive suspension by the Office of the Ombudsman as announced by Ombudsman Jesus Crispin Remulla on May 15, suspending him for six months without pay. Remulla said, "We can't ignore something of this magnitude." Meanwhile, the NBI director Melvin Matibag announced Senator Robin Padilla and Aplasca among the persons of interest in dela Rosa's escape, adding that Senate President Alan Peter Cayetano, although not a person of interest, owed an explanation about dela Rosa's escape.

Ombudsman Remulla ordered the Senate to submit copies of CCTV footage during the gunfire incident, hoping there were no coverup as there are allegations that the Senate CCTV footage on that night may have been hidden. He also called out dela Rosa for using the Senate to evade the ICC arrest warrant issued against him, saying flight is an indication of guilt. Aplasca reported that he had failed to find CCTV footage showing the positions of OSAA members and the Marines, only showing the tactical personnel towards the tail end of the footage.

Senate President Cayetano called on the ombudsman via a Facebook livestream to suspend Matibag as he is "more a suspect" than Aplasca. Cayetano said the suspension of Matibag should cover not only the director but also the NBI's head of transnational crimes Jerome Bomediano, whom he said had been named by the bureau's confidential agent arrested during the incident. Bomediano is the person Imee Marcos said was mentioned by a "confidential agent" who was arrested inside the Senate during the chaos. He also accused Matibag of lying since the attempted arrest of Senator dela Rosa on May 11 and misleading President Bongbong Marcos about the Senate standoff on May 13, saying the NBI chief ignored the President's supposed "stand down" order to the military, police, and NBI. Cayetano claimed Matibag repeatedly changed the agency's narrative by first denying that NBI agents were inside the Senate complex, then later saying they were there because of a GSIS letter requesting security. He questioned this explanation, noting that the GSIS had never previously asked the NBI for security assistance. Cayetano further alleged that the NBI violated an agreement not to set up checkpoints around the Senate after videos surfaced showing senators' vehicles being inspected. He defended Aplasca, saying any person would have acted the same as Aplasca. Senator Jinggoy Estrada previously said in a phone interview with reporters that the Senate majority bloc supported Aplasca's actions during the incident, arguing that the warning shot fired by the acting Senate Sergeant-at-Arms was justified because of reports that armed NBI personnel were attempting to enter the Senate complex. Estrada also called for the release of CCTV footage related to the incident.

The Department of Justice (DOJ) secretary Fredderick Vida later held a press conference regarding the events, confirming the ICC warrant of arrest against dela Rosa and that there is a pending request from the ICC, saying it was already received by the national government. He said that dela Rosa will be arrested if he tries to leave the Philippines and that the Philippine government "will definitely submit to the request of the ICC." He also announced that dela Rosa was under an immigration lookout bulletin order, which can monitor his movements but not prevent him from leaving the country.

At 22:44 PHT, Pasay Police Chief Joselito De Sesto stated that the footage recorded by ABS-CBN of a convoy on May 14 (which Senators dela Rosa and Padilla supposedly used to leave the complex) was not actually a convoy. He said that he was in the white SUV with police branding shown in the clip, and after exiting the Senate premises, he turned in the direction of the World Trade Center Metro Manila, while the black van turned the other way. In an interview, NBI Director Matibag said that Cayetano's claims of the shooting being an attack on the Senate was false, saying that the Senate reacted that the chamber was about to be stormed without coordination, adding, "They moved in based on assumptions that they would be attacked." The Southern Police District clarified that no firearm was recovered from the NBI driver who was arrested the night of the shooting inside the Senate building. Meanwhile, the NBI released body camera footage taken from the GSIS compound during the incident.

=== May 16 ===
Videos obtained by GMA News showed vehicles leaving from the Senate building on May 14 from 02:30 PHT to 03:00 PHT, including a white Toyota Fortuner at 02:32 PHT, a Senate logbook recording Padilla's departure three minutes later, and a white vehicle with PNP markings at 03:03 PHT. Ombudsman Jesus Crispin Remulla reported that the Senate did not accept the subpoena to recover the CCTV footage of the shooting and rejected another summons for Aplasca. Aplasca, however, said that OSAA already submitted CCTV copies to the police. At 21:00 PHT, Cayetano held a Facebook Live explaining the change in leadership, the shooting incident, and the impeachment of Duterte. In it, he rejected the claim that the leadership change was a strategic event to block the impeachment of Duterte, stating that the Senate will convene as an impeachment court on May 18, urging senators to attend the session. The website Politiko said that anonymous reports said the Senate leadership was "shaky," with more senators uncomfortable with Cayetano's presidential style. An anonymous quote in the report stated, "The prevailing sentiment is simple: anybody but Alan [...] He's not particularly well-liked by many of his colleagues, and he's not viewed as a consensus builder — something Malacañang needs at this stage to move key legislation." An online petition was launched by youth group Samahan ng Progresibong Kabataan to withhold the salary of Remulla which 600 people have signed.

=== May 17 ===
At 14:00 PHT, Tindig Pilipinas, an organization consisting of pro-democracy and civil society groups, protested in front of the EDSA Shrine in Quezon City against the protection of dela Rosa and for the Senate to start the impeachment of Sara Duterte. Cordillera progressive groups also protested in front of Malcolm Square in Baguio City, with Alliance of Concerned Teachers regional director Louise Montenegro comparing Senate proceedings to a circus and a telenovela. In an 83-page comment made by the Solicitor General of the Philippines (SGP), individuals can be surrendered to international courts through Philippine law, urging the Supreme Court to deny dela Rosa's petition to stop his possible arrest and transfer to the ICC. In the comment, the SGP said, "The essence of fugitive behavior is not limited to crossing national borders but extends to any deliberate effort to place oneself beyond the reach of lawful judicial process."

Regarding the shooting incident on May 13, Senator Erwin Tulfo said the Senate should cooperate with the Ombudsman's investigation on the incident following reports that the Senate refused to receive the preventive suspension against Aplasca and a subpoena for CCTV footage. He warned that such refusal would raise more doubts.

=== May 18 ===
Malacañang Palace said President Bongbong Marcos was dismayed by what happened in the Senate on the day of the incident. The Palace also contradicted Senate President Cayetano's claim that the Senate was under attack. Palace Press Officer Claire Castro said, "It was only the statement made by Sen. Alan Cayetano. As far as the government is concerned, the Senate was never under attack." Senator dela Rosa's camp issued a rebuttal to Solicitor General Darlene Berberabe's stand urging the Supreme Court to deny dela Rosa's petition for a temporary restraining order against the ICC's arrest warrant. They maintained that "Senator dela Rosa is not a fugitive from justice." The Office of the Ombudsman confirmed that the Senate had already received the ombudsman's order placing Acting Senate Sergeant-at-Arms Mao Aplasca under preventive suspension, as well as the subpoena requesting CCTV footage connected to the May 13 shooting incident at the Senate building. The Southern Police District also confirmed that NBI driver Mel Oragon, who is already in custody in connection with the shooting incident, tested positive for gunpowder residue. Later, he was temporarily released after posting bail. Senator Robin Padilla was asked who dela Rosa is hiding from if the ICC arrest warrant against him is non-existent. Padilla responded that dela Rosa left the Senate premises on May 14 to hide from an alleged kidnapper. In an interview with 24 Oras, Padilla admitted that the vehicle seen in the CCTV footage leaving the Senate premises at the early hours of May 14 belongs to him. However, when asked whether the vehicle was carrying Senator dela Rosa, he laughed and replied, "Let's just wait for the investigation."

At 15:00 PHT, the Senate convened as an impeachment court for the impeachment trial of Vice President Sara Duterte. Senator dela Rosa was not present. By this time, rumors had been circulating regarding a potential coup and change of leadership. Before the convening of the impeachment court, ten senators—namely Bam Aquino, Erwin Tulfo, Kiko Pangilinan, Win Gatchalian, Risa Hontiveros, Raffy Tulfo, Lito Lapid, JV Ejercito, Ping Lacson, and Migz Zubiri—were seen entering Tito Sotto's office. Meanwhile, seven senators—Imee Marcos, Camille Villar, Joel Villanueva, Jinggoy Estrada, Rodante Marcoleta, Loren Legarda, and Pia Cayetano—were seen entering Alan Peter Cayetano's office. Prior to this, Senate President Alan Peter Cayetano held a press conference, where he said that he considered Pia Cayetano to become Senate president instead of him. When the session began, Senators Zubiri and Ejercito joined the minority bloc with Senator Alan Peter Cayetano retaining Senate presidency. The senators also elected Jose Luis Montales as the new Senate Secretary after Mark Llandro Mendoza resigned. Mendoza said his resignation has nothing to do with the incidents on May 13. At 18:00 PHT, a protest led by Alab ng Bayan and Bayan Muna and joined by other progressive organizations was staged in front of the Senate, calling for the arrest of dela Rosa, the impeachment of Duterte, and the removal of Cayetano as senate president. After claims surfaced that dela Rosa left the country, Padilla said that he was not the type of person to betray the country, stating in Filipino, "Bato won't do that, he loves the Philippines."

=== May 19 ===
The NBI volunteer-driver arrested after the shooting incident insisted that he neither carried nor fired a weapon that day. He explained that he had just been instructed to return to the GSIS building to retrieve a bag containing medicine that an NBI agent had left behind. According to him, a GSIS security guard accompanied him to the second floor, where he was unexpectedly cornered and arrested by police officers on the GSIS side of the compound. He further maintained that he never entered the actual Senate building during the commotion. The driver also denied ownership or knowledge of the confiscated sling bag, asserting that he neither handled nor saw the bag he had originally been instructed to retrieve. He insisted that CCTV footage from the building, as well as viral videos circulating online, would ultimately vindicate him by showing that he was completely unarmed and remained calm and cooperative throughout the arrest. Meanwhile, the NBI said it now has leads on the whereabouts of dela Rosa, adding that if anyone is likely to know his location, it would be Senator Robin Padilla. They also released body-worn camera footage showing that the arrested NBI driver linked to the gunfire incident was unarmed and was in a different area at the time the shooting occurred. The PNP then linked a vehicle registered under Senator Padilla to the departure of dela Rosa from the Senate after the May 13 gunfire incident.

DILG Secretary Jonvic Remulla said "all evidence points that there was no attack on the Senate" during the gunfire incident. The Criminal Investigation and Detection Group (CIDG) released a comprehensive timeline detailing the sequence of events surrounding the shooting incident, while the NBI separately presented a timeline tracing its personnel's movements within the GSIS complex. Evidence from the initial investigation of the PNP showed all bullet holes from the incident came from gunshots fired inside the Senate building, indicating the Senate was not under attack. They said there were four shooters as 44 fired bullets came from four firearms in which five came from the NBI side while the remaining 39 came from the OSAA. Of these, 21 were accounted for: five from NBI agent Darwin Francisco's gun and 16 from OSAA personnel Chris Montilla and Joemil Ledesma's weapons. Twenty-three fired bullets, however, remained unaccounted for, but were believed to be all from the acting Senate Sergeant-at-Arms Mao Aplasca's shots. They also presented CCTV footage from both the Senate and GSIS sides of the building, along with the timeline. The footage showed Aplasca firing the first three shots in the direction of an NBI agent. NBI agent Francisco was seen running for cover, after which he responded with covering fire. Aplasca also refused to surrender his firearm for investigation. Remulla clarified that they are not concluding that the incident was staged, stating, "The only conclusion is that there was no attack on the Senate."

=== May 20 ===
Aplasca said to reporters that the CCTV footage shown by the DILG was "spliced" and "selected to support [the DILG's] narrative". Meanwhile, further footage was revealed, showing Senators dela Rosa and Padilla, alongside Padilla's deputy chief of staff Jean Alia Robles, leaving the Senate together, in the same Toyota Fortuner that was seen driving out of the compound in previously released videos. Aplasca also insisted that the Senate was under attack and surrendered his firearm to the CIDG to undergo ballistic examination. The PNP-CIDG said it is recommending the filing of charges against Aplasca and the two other OSAA personnel involved on the May 13 shooting incident. The CIDG added that it would submit their findings and recommendations to the DOJ for reassessment. CIDG chief Robert Morico II said the investigation found that there was no attack on the Senate. He explained that the use of warning shots by OSAA personnel was not allowed under existing rules governing private security services and police operational procedures. Morico also defended the NBI agent who fired cover shots, saying the agent acted only after OSAA personnel allegedly fired continuously and that the agent was the one assaulted.

The Supreme Court voted 9-5-1, denying the request from dela Rosa for temporary legal protection against a possible arrest by the ICC.

In the Senate session, Senator Risa Hontiveros made a privilege speech. "Starting last Monday, what we're showing is as if nothing happened," she said. Fellow senator Pia Cayetano blew into tears in a manifestation afterwards. "I'm not blaming anyone, but after all of that, when I looked at our Viber group, the former majority, not a single one of you asked how we were doing," she said. Senator Erwin Tulfo disputed her claim that no one from the minority bloc checked on members of the majority after the May 13 shooting incident inside the Senate complex, saying several senators sent messages in their group chat that night. Senator Ping Lacson also commented, writing on X: "How could you even check on people who seemed happily eating, drinking coffee, and even going on Facebook Live, while accusing the minority bloc of supposedly knowing something about the gunfires in the Senate?"

=== May 21 ===
Justice Secretary Fredderick Vida had confirmed in a press conference that the PNP and the NBI were tasked with arresting Dela Rosa. "I would like to confirm that Philippine law enforcement agencies, the PNP, NBI, are now tasked to effect the arrest of Senator Dela Rosa," he said. "Senator Bato is a fugitive from justice. He should be brought to the ICC to face the charges," he added.

Vida also stated that anyone, including public and influential individuals, who will help or shield Dela Rosa, will face legal consequences.

=== May 22 ===
The government applied for an Interpol red notice against Dela Rosa due to the arrest warrant from the ICC.

DOJ spokesman Polo Martinez revealed the development when asked if the government had already alerted law enforcement agencies around the globe to the issuance of the ICC arrest warrant against Dela Rosa.

"As far as I know, there is an application for an Interpol red notice. That is a remedy available to us," Martinez said.

=== May 24 ===
Palace press officer Claire Castro said in an interview on DZMM that future ICC arrest warrants could be enforced without having to pass through Philippine courts. She cited Republic Act No. 9851, the Philippine Act on Crimes Against International Humanitarian Law, Genocide, and Other Crimes Against Humanity, as providing legal mechanisms for government action.

Section 17 of the law allows Philippine authorities, in the interest of justice, to forgo an investigation or prosecution if another court or international tribunal is already investigating or prosecuting the same offense.

Senator Panfilo Lacson reiterated advice he had previously given dela Rosa when the latter went into hiding. In an interview with DZBB, Lacson said that while he would not explicitly advise dela Rosa to surrender, he believed that dela Rosa should remain in hiding, citing their past working relationship in the Presidential Anti-Organized Crime Task Force (PAOCTF) and their shared background in the PNP.

=== May 27 ===
On May 27, personnel from the Criminal Investigation and Detection Group (CIDG) and the National Bureau of Investigation (NBI) searched a property in Balibago, Angeles City, Pampanga, which authorities suspected was being used as a hideout by dela Rosa. However, dela Rosa was not found on the premises. The barangay captain of Balibago said that the property was reportedly owned by an uncle of Senator Robin Padilla.

=== May 29 ===
A fellow Mindanaoan lawmaker has challenged fugitive Senator Ronald “Bato” Dela Rosa to be courageous enough to attend the expected Senate impeachment trial of Vice President Sara Z. Duterte.

In a statement, House of Representatives trial spokesperson, Zia Alonto Adiong of Lanao del Sur, said Dela Rosa should show the same determination and readiness to face all risks to attend the vice president’s trial, as he did in attending the recent voting on the Senate leadership change.

“Let us remember, physical presence is important in legislation. The rules to require physical presence of legislators were actually (intended) to inculcate among members the deep commitment to good work,” he said.

== Reactions ==
On May 14, the Integrated Bar of the Philippines called on the Senate to perform its constitutional duties "fairly and independently" amid the ICC arrest warrant against dela Rosa and the impeachment proceedings against Sara Duterte. The IBP also condemned the Senate shooting incident and warned against attempts to exploit the situation to provoke a constitutional crisis. On the same day, several business and civil society groups, including the Management Association of the Philippines, Makati Business Club, and Federation of Philippine Industries, called on the Senate to convene as an impeachment court for Vice President Duterte following delays amid developments in the Senate, warning that failure to do so could undermine the rule of law, institutional credibility, and investor confidence.

In an interview with DZMM, former Senate President Franklin Drilon said the events put the Philippines to shame, adding that the lack of stability and control can be attributed to "failure of leadership" from both Malacañang and the Senate. Akbayan representative Percival Cendaña said dela Rosa should surrender to authorities to clear up the integrity of the Senate. Opposition coalition 1Sambayan considered the decision made by Senate leadership to place dela Rosa under "protective custody" to be obstruction of justice. Dela Rosa's camp denied allegations that the gunshots were part of a diversion tactic to help dela Rosa leave the building. In an interview in The Hague, Sara Duterte defended dela Rosa, stating, "It is sad and infuriating what is happening in our country, especially the disrespect shown towards the institution of the Senate." Human rights lawyer Dino de Leon said that the people who let dela Rosa escape should be investigated and held liable.

On May 15, the alumni association of the Philippine Military Academy issued a call for its members to remain non-partisan, following dela Rosa's public call for support from his PMA colleagues on May 13. The Philippine Star, citing a statement from the Foreign Buyers Association of the Philippines, reported that the incident affected investor confidence; at least three foreign buyers in the furniture and textiles industry postponed their trips to the country following the events in the Senate. Former members of two University of the Philippines political formations called for the resignation of Cayetano, describing his actions as a "grave failure of leadership, judgment, and institutional responsibility." In a now deleted post, Congressman Kiko Barzaga falsely reported multiple deaths just after the shooting.

Ronald Llamas, writing for The Philippine Star, opined that Cayetano had attacked the Senate, stating that, "In his relentless pursuit of the Senate presidency and to protect allies from accountability, he gravely eroded the institution's integrity and credibility." Llamas then added that Cayetano had become the Senate president to prevent the impeachment of Duterte and had contained and aided the escape of dela Rosa, concluding the opinion piece with "May God, whose name Cayetano invokes so freely like a false prophet, make his Senate presidency the shortest ever." One News journalist Amy Pamintuan said that the shooting in the Senate has turned the Philippines into a laughingstock, garnered media attention, and described the event as a "zarzuela," concluding with "The Senate has become a national disgrace." Tony La Viña of Rappler said that the "shielding" of dela Rosa was more than a procedural lapse, while Antonio Contreras of The Manila Times said that the Senate was attacking itself and was in freefall. Before the convening of the Senate as an impeachment court, the Social Action Network and Caritas Philippines urged Filipinos to pray for Senators to "adhere to the rule of law and serve the common good in the pursuit of justice and truth."

Mayors for Good Governance, a coalition of incumbent mayors in the Philippines, on Monday, May 25, called out the Senate's handling of Senator Ronald dela Rosa's prolonged absence and condemned what it described as his "absenteeism."

"Senator Dela Rosa was absent for about half a year before he showed up to vote for the leadership change in the Senate. He gets close to PHP300,000 every month in salary He got around PHP2.1 million during his 7 month absence. For the Filipino worker, the "No work, no pay" policy is applied." the statement read.

== Misinformation ==
The Philippine Star noted an uptick of posts on Chinese-language social media from May 15 to May 26 falsely claiming that the Armed Forces of the Philippines has withdrew support from the Marcos administration, that the Duterte camp is gaining support and expressed hope that China–Philippines relations will improve in the future.

== In popular culture ==
Joniffer Mandac, a developer and designer, created a pixelated web-based video game called Senate Run. The game features a cartoon version of Ronald dela Rosa running through obstacles, avoiding NBI agents, and jumping over wet floor signs. Once caught, the game shows dela Rosa kneeling as an NBI agent serves him an ICC arrest warrant. Senate Run has drawn comparisons to the Dinosaur Game and Flappy Bird.

In an interview with Balita via the Manila Bulletin on May 23, Mandac said that he and his co-workers created Senate Run for fun while he was learning how to develop a web game. He stated that the idea originated after one of his co-workers brought up the trending Senate issue, which eventually became the game's main concept. According to Mandac, they initially planned to develop the game in 3D, similar to Temple Run, but because he was still new to game development, he instead opted for a simpler 2D version. He also said that he did not expect the game to become popular because he uploaded it to TikTok only to share his progress and projects. Mandac added that developing Senate Run took four nights because he was also occupied with other priorities and internet connection problems.

As of May 2026, Senate Run was temporarily unavailable after a sudden rise in traffic caused the game to exceed the limits of Mandac's free hosting service. Mandac stated that he did not yet have the budget to keep the game running continuously. GMA News journalist Mark Salazar reported on 24 Oras that Mandac was considering adding power-ups to the game.

== See also ==
- Arrests of senators in the Philippine Senate
- Surrender of Jinggoy Estrada
- Arrest of Apollo Quiboloy (2024)
- Batasang Pambansa bombing (2007)
