= Senate Run =

2026 web browser video game by Joniffer Mandac

- Developer: Joniffer Mandac
- Composer: Freesound
- Engine: Phaser, Vite
- Platform: Web browser
- Release: May 2026 (Note: Currently, the game is temporarily unavailable due to a sudden surge in traffic which caused it to exceed the limits of Joniffer Mandac's free hosting service)
- Genre: Endless runner
- Mode: Single-player

Senate Run is a Filipino browser-based endless runner video game developed by Filipino indie developer Joniffer Mandac. The game takes inspiration from the viral incident involving Senator Ronald "Bato" dela Rosa being chased by agents of the National Bureau of Investigation (NBI) inside the Senate building. Players control a character based on dela Rosa while avoiding NBI agents and other obstacles inside a fictionalized version of the Philippine Senate.

Senate Run is free-to-play and is accessible through web browsers. The game became viral on social media shortly after its release, particularly on TikTok. Senate Run is temporarily unavailable after a sudden surge in traffic causes the game to exceed the limits of Mandac's free hosting service.

== Gameplay ==
Ronald dela Rosa jumping over an NBI agent and a wet floor sign inside the Senate building.

Senate Run is a single-player, side-scrolling, pixel-style endless runner game played in a web browser. The gameplay has been compared to Flappy Bird and the Google Chrome dinosaur game. Players control a pixelated character resembling Senator Ronald "Bato" dela Rosa. The objective is to avoid obstacles and survive for as long as possible while running through hallways based on the Philippine Senate building.

The player must jump over wet floor signs and evade incoming NBI agents. Failing to avoid obstacles causes the game to end. After losing, the game shows the character kneeling while an NBI agent serves an arrest warrant. Some reports stated that the game may contain an ending where the player reaches a getaway vehicle outside the Senate compound.

== Development ==
Senate Run was developed by Joniffer Mandac, also known online as "Jopel". Mandac worked on the project while employed at a software development company. According to Mandac, the game was created mainly "for fun" and for his friends. The game was originally planned as a 3D game similar to Temple Run, but later changed it into a 2D game because Mandac was still learning game development. He also said that his co-workers suggested possible coding approaches and technology stacks before he started developing the project at home.

The game was inspired by CCTV footage and news coverage of dela Rosa running from NBI operatives inside the Senate building. Mandac later posted online that the Senate situation had become so chaotic that he "accidentally turned it into a game". Mandac stated that the game was completed in four nights. The project was built using Phaser.js, a framework used for browser-based games. He later considered adding new features such as power-ups after the game became viral online. In his TikTok account, Mandac said in the comment section that he used Vite and JavaScript, with assets including audio and sound effects from Freesound and a small assortment of AI-generated images.

Mandac also revealed plans for other parody games inspired by Senate incidents, including projects involving Senate Sergeant at Arms Mao Aplasca, Senators Pia Cayetano, Kiko Pangilinan, and Robin Padilla.

== Reception ==
Senate Run became viral on social media platforms after its release. Videos related to the game received hundreds of thousands of views and likes on TikTok. Several publications described the game as part of the public's online reaction to the Senate incident involving dela Rosa. Philippine Daily Inquirer compared the game to popular endless runner titles such as Flappy Bird, Jetpack Joyride, and Dinosaur Game. REVU Philippines described the game as a parody of the "current situation" inside the Philippine Senate. Enduins Gaming wrote that the gameplay reflected themes of evasion and escape connected to the real-life controversy.

The game also became a viral internet meme because of its "parody" style and references to political events. Several reports noted the use of wet floor signs as comedic obstacles throughout the game. Senate Run is temporarily unavailable after a sudden surge in traffic caused the game to exceed the limits of Mandac's free hosting service. Mandac stated that he did not yet have the budget to keep the game running continuously.

== App adaptations ==
In July 2026, an adaptation of the game, titled Bato Dela Rosa Senate Run, was developed as an arcade video game for Android by MannyMon.
