= Sergeant-at-Arms of the House of Representatives of the Philippines =

Elected officer of the House of Representatives of the Philippines

- Tagapamayapa ng Kapulungan ng mga Kinatawan ng Pilipinas
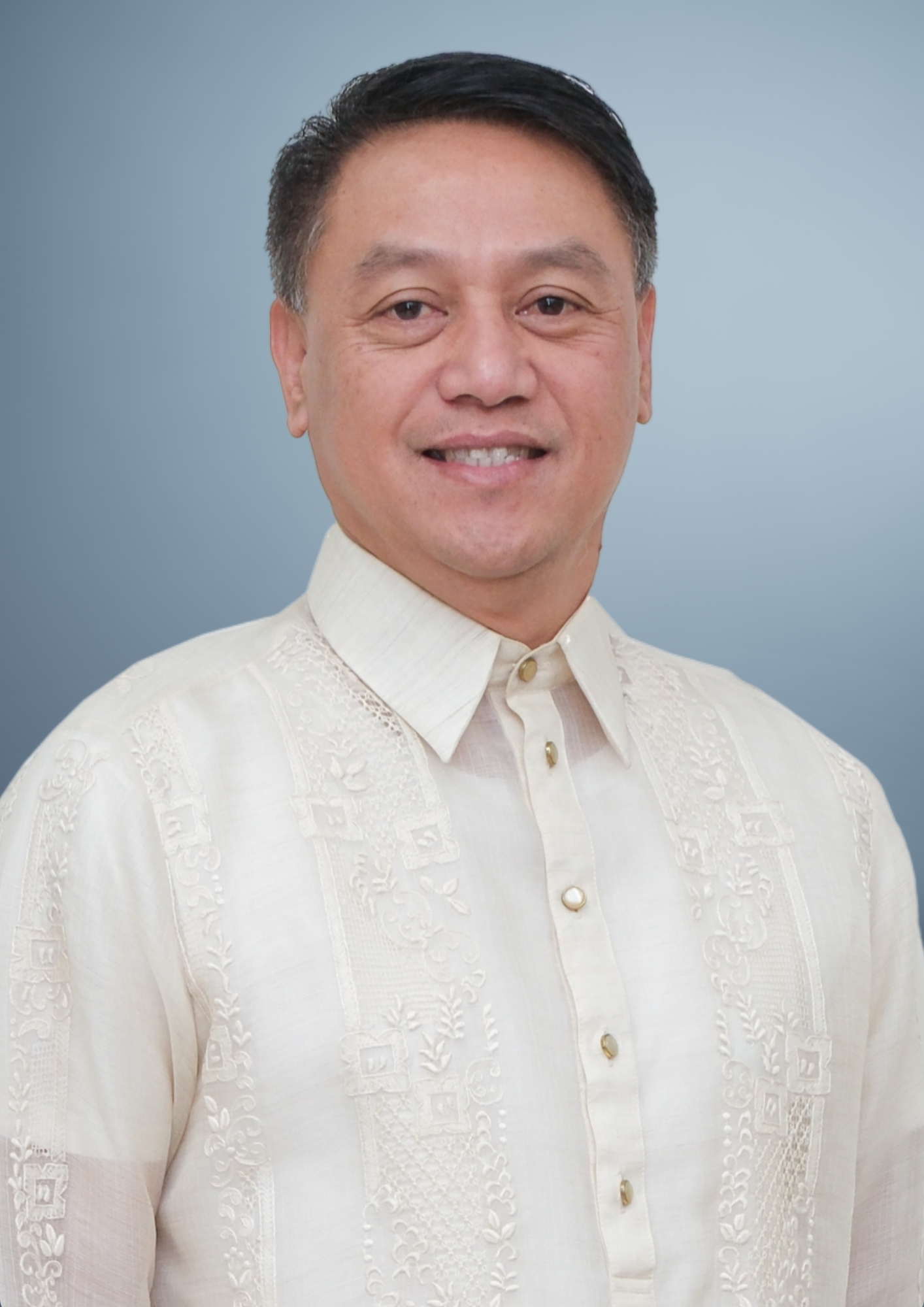
- Incumbent; Ret. BGen. Ferdinand Melchor C. dela Cruz, PA, MNSA since September 23, 2025
- House of Representatives of the Philippines
- Style: The Honorable
- Seat: Batasang Pambansa Complex, Batasan Hills, Quezon City
- Appointer: Elected by the House of Representatives
- Salary: ₱2,270,000 per year (2023)

The sergeant-at-arms of the House of Representatives of the Philippines (Filipino: Tagapamayapa ng Kapulungan ng mga Kinatawan ng Pilipinas) is an officer of the Philippine House of Representatives, whose duty is to ensure order within the House of Representatives Building Complex—the seat of the lower chamber of Congress—enforce the rules of the House, and protect the lives of its officers, members, personnel, guests, and the property within its premises. The mace of the House—serving as its symbol of authority—situated at the foot of the speaker’s rostrum during sessions, is also in their custody, acting as the warrant empowering the sergeant-at-arms to enforce order in the floor of the chamber upon the speaker’s directive.

The current sergeant-at-arms of the House is retired Brigadier General Ferdinand Melchor dela Cruz.

== Powers and duties ==
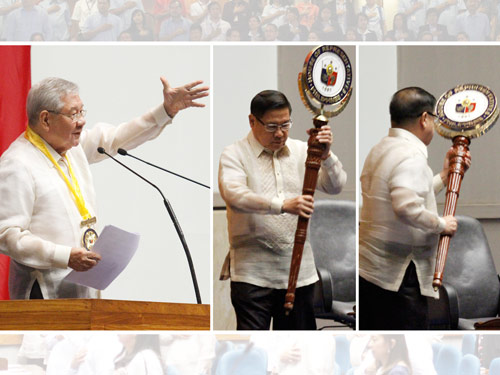
House Speaker Feliciano Belmonte Jr. and Sergeant-at-Arms Nicasio J. Radovan Jr., holding the House Mace, at the closing of the Third Regular Session of the 15th Congress.

According to Rule VII, Section 20 of the Rules of the House of Representatives, the duties and powers of the sergeant-at-arms are:

- To attend all sessions of the House unless excused by the Speaker or the Presiding Officer, and personally or through his designee(s), all meetings of the committees;
- To strictly enforce rules relating to admission to the session hall, the galleries, offices, corridors and premises of the House building;
- To ensure that employees under the office of the Sergeant-at-Arms observe proper behavior and faithfully perform their duties;
- To implement orders and serve all processes issued by authority of the House or by the Speaker;
- To secure and maintain order in the session hall, galleries, offices, corridors and premises of the House building during sessions, during the conduct of meetings of committees and during such other proceedings or activities of the House whether or not the House is in session;
- To secure the safety of the Members while in the House premises or in any other place as the Speaker may direct;
- To secure the properties of the House;
- To recommend and implement upon the direction of the Speaker, security management systems, policies and programs that will ensure the maintenance of order in the House and its premises, protect the safety of the Members and employees, visitors and other persons who are within the premises of the House on official business, and the preservation of properties, equipment, facilities, documents and records of the House; and
- To act as custodian of the Mace, which shall be the symbol of authority and shall be borne by the Sergeant-at-Arms while enforcing order on the floor.

Section 21 also states that "the Sergeant-at-Arms shall prepare and submit to the House, through the Speaker, at the end of every fiscal year, a performance report relative to programs and activities relating to the security and maintenance of order in the House."

== List ==
=== House of Representatives (1945–1973) ===
Portrait	Name	Term start	Term end	Legislature	Refs.
	Narciso Diokno	May 25, 1946	January 1950	2nd Commonwealth; Congress	
	Narciso Diokno	May 25, 1946	January 1950	1st Congress	
	Antonio Garcia	January 1950	January 25, 1954	2nd Congress	
	Narciso Diokno	January 25, 1954	January 30, 1962	3rd Congress	
	Narciso Diokno	January 25, 1954	January 30, 1962	4th Congress	
	Simeon Salonga	January 30, 1962	September 23, 1972	5th Congress	
	Simeon Salonga	January 30, 1962	September 23, 1972	6th Congress	
	Simeon Salonga	January 30, 1962	September 23, 1972	7th Congress	

=== Batasang Pambansa (1978–1986) ===
Portrait	Name	Term start	Term end	Legislature	Refs.
	Raoul Cauton	June 12, 1978	1979	Interim; Batasang; Pambansa	
	Anselmo Avenido Jr.	1979	1984	Interim; Batasang; Pambansa	
	Cesar Pobre	1984	March 25, 1986	Regular; Batasang; Pambansa	

=== House of Representatives (1987–present) ===
Portrait	Name	Term start	Term end	Legislature	Refs.
	Serapio Taccad	July 27, 1987	July 27, 1992	8th Congress	
	Bayani Fabic	July 27, 1992	2008	9th Congress	
	Bayani Fabic	July 27, 1992	2008	10th Congress	
	Bayani Fabic	July 27, 1992	2008	11th Congress	
	Bayani Fabic	July 27, 1992	2008	12th Congress	
	Bayani Fabic	July 27, 1992	2008	13th Congress	
	Bayani Fabic	July 27, 1992	2008	14th Congress	
	Horacio Lactao	2008	July 26, 2010	14th Congress	
	Nicasio Radovan	July 26, 2010	July 25, 2016	15th Congress	
	Nicasio Radovan	July 26, 2010	July 25, 2016	16th Congress	
	Roland Detabali	July 25, 2016	July 30, 2018	17th Congress	
	Romeo Prestoza	July 30, 2018	July 22, 2019	17th Congress	
	Ramon Apolinario	July 22, 2019	October 12, 2020	18th Congress	
	Mao Aplasca	October 12, 2020	December 6, 2021	18th Congress	
	Rodelio Jocson	December 6, 2021	July 25, 2022	18th Congress	
	Napoleon Taas	July 25, 2022	September 23, 2025	19th Congress	
	Napoleon Taas	July 25, 2022	September 23, 2025	20th Congress	
	Melchor dela Cruz	September 23, 2025	present	20th Congress	

== See also ==
- Sergeant-at-Arms of the Senate of the Philippines
