= Philippine Senate Committee on Public Order and Dangerous Drugs =

Standing committee of the Senate of the Philippines

Committee on Public Order and Dangerous Drugs
- Senate of the Philippines; 20th Congress

History
- New session started: July 28, 2025

Leadership
- Chair: Ronald dela Rosa (PDP) since May 11, 2026

Structure
- Seats: 11
- Political groups: Majority (7): NPC (3); Akbayan (1); KANP (1); Lakas (1); Independent (1); Minority (4): PDP (3); PMP (1)

The Philippine Senate Committee on Public Order and Dangerous Drugs is a standing committee of the Senate of the Philippines.

It was known as the Committee on Public Order and Illegal Drugs until November 9, 2010.

== Jurisdiction ==
According to the Rules of the Senate, the committee handles all matters relating to:

- Peace and order
- The National Police Commission
  - Philippine National Police
- The Bureau of Jail Management and Penology
- The Bureau of Fire Protection
- The Philippine Drug Enforcement Agency
- The Dangerous Drugs Board
- The Bureau of Corrections
- The Office for Transportation Security
- The Bureau of Immigration
- Private security agencies
- Use, sale, acquisition, possession, cultivation, manufacture and distribution of prohibited and regulated drugs and other similar substances as provided for under pertinent laws
- Prosecution of offenders, and rehabilitation of drug users and dependents, including the formulation of drug-related policies

== Members, 20th Congress ==
Based on the Rules of the Senate, the Senate Committee on Public Order and Dangerous Drugs has 11 members.

Position	Member	Party
Chairperson	JV Ejercito (Note: Also serving as the deputy majority leader alongside Risa Hontiveros (Akbayan).)	NPC
Vice Chairpersons	Ronald dela Rosa	PDP
Vice Chairpersons	Bong Go	PDP
Deputy Majority Leader	Risa Hontiveros	Akbayan
Members for the Majority	Bam Aquino	KANP
Members for the Majority	Win Gatchalian	NPC
Members for the Majority	Loren Legarda	NPC
Members for the Majority	Erwin Tulfo	Lakas
Members for the Majority	Raffy Tulfo	Independent
Members for the Minority	Jinggoy Estrada	PMP
Members for the Minority	Robin Padilla	PDP

Ex officio members:

- Senate President pro tempore Panfilo Lacson
- Majority Floor Leader Juan Miguel Zubiri
- Minority Floor Leader Alan Peter Cayetano

Committee secretary: Arthur Lawrence L. Acierto

== Historical membership rosters ==
=== 19th Congress ===
Position	Member	Party
Chairperson	Ronald dela Rosa	PDP–Laban
Vice Chairperson	Bong Go	PDP–Laban
Members for the Majority	JV Ejercito	NPC
Members for the Majority	Mark Villar	Nacionalista
Members for the Majority	Nancy Binay	UNA
Members for the Majority	Loren Legarda	NPC
Members for the Majority	Imee Marcos	Nacionalista
Members for the Majority	Robin Padilla	PDP–Laban
Members for the Majority	Grace Poe	Independent
Members for the Majority	Cynthia Villar	Nacionalista
Member for the Minority	Risa Hontiveros	Akbayan

Committee secretary: Arthur Lawrence L. Acierto

=== 18th Congress ===
Position	Member	Party
Chairperson	Ronald dela Rosa	PDP–Laban
Vice Chairpersons	Panfilo Lacson	Independent
Vice Chairpersons	Bong Go	PDP–Laban
Members for the Majority	Richard Gordon	Independent
Members for the Majority	Manny Pacquiao	PDP–Laban
Members for the Majority	Bong Revilla	Lakas
Members for the Majority	Francis Tolentino	PDP–Laban
Members for the Minority	Risa Hontiveros	Akbayan
Members for the Minority	Leila de Lima	Liberal

Committee secretary: Arthur Lawrence L. Acierto

== See also ==
- List of Philippine Senate committees
