= Fort Bonifacio =

Headquarters of the Philippine Army

Coordinates: 14°31′57″N 121°02′42″E

Fort Andres Bonifacio
- Kuta Andres Bonifacio
- Taguig City, Philippines
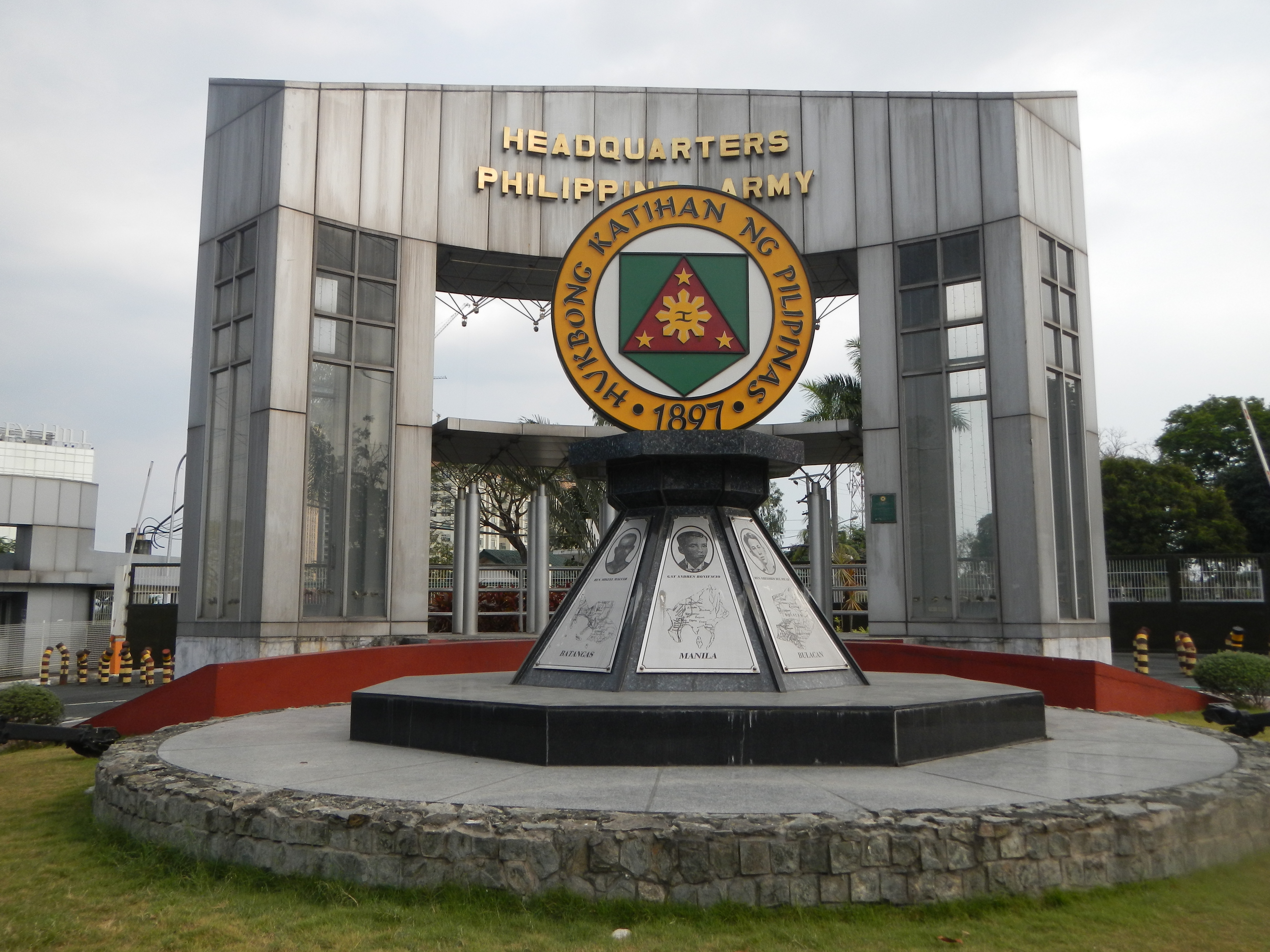
- Main gate of the Headquarters Philippine Army

Site information
- Type: Military Base
- Controlled by: Philippines

Site history
- Built: 1901
- In use: 1901–present
- Materials: Concrete, steel

Garrison information
- Current commander: Brigadier General Ivan V. San Jose
- Garrison: Philippine Army; Philippine Marine Corps; PN Seabees (Naval Combat Engineer Brigade); Southern Police District Headquarters

Fort Andres Bonifacio (formerly Fort William McKinley) is the site of the national headquarters of the Philippine Army (Headquarters Philippine Army or HPA) located in Taguig City, Philippines. The camp is named after Andres Bonifacio, the revolutionary leader of the Katipunan during the Philippine Revolution.

It is located near Villamor Air Base, the national headquarters of the Philippine Air Force (PAF).

== History ==
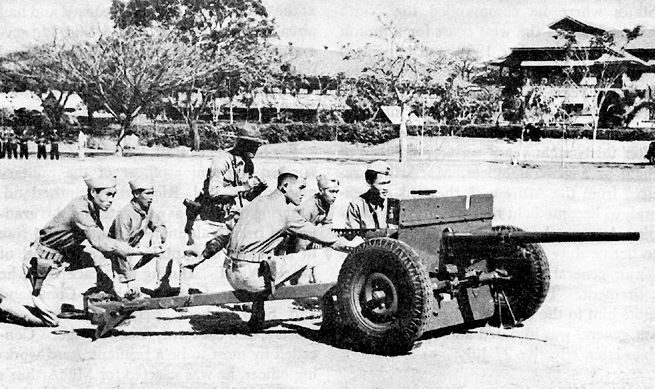
Philippine Scouts at Fort McKinley firing a 37-mm antitank gun in training.

=== American rule ===
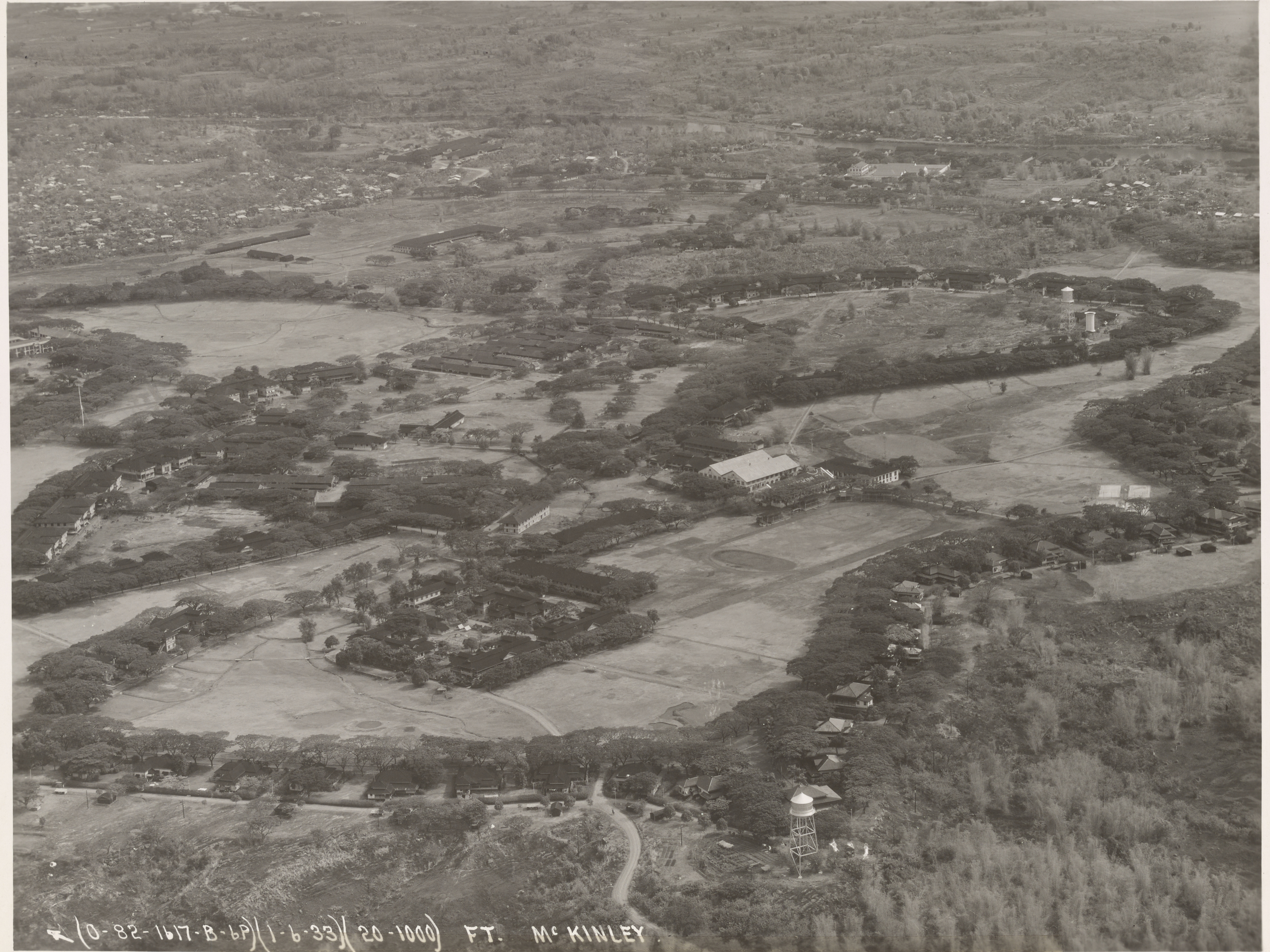
Aerial view of Fort William McKinley, 1933

Fort William McKinley, now Fort Bonifacio, was established during the Philippine–American War in 1901. The land is situated south of the Pasig River, down to the creek Alabang, near Manila. It was declared a U.S. military reservation by U.S. Secretary of War Elihu Root.

In 1916, the 3rd Battalion of the 31st Infantry Regiment was formed here. Until December 1920, this was the home of the 31st Infantry Regiment. During World War II, the USAFFE headquarters for the Philippine Department and the Philippine Division were at the fort. The bulk of the Philippine Division was stationed there and this was where, under the National Defense Act of 1935, specialized artillery training was conducted.

On March 18, 1926, U.S. Army Lieutenant John Sewell Thompson was executed by hanging at Fort McKinley for murdering his fiancée, 17-year-old Audrey Burleigh. He was the first American officer executed in peacetime, and to date, he is the only graduate of the United States Military Academy to have been executed.

=== Postwar era ===
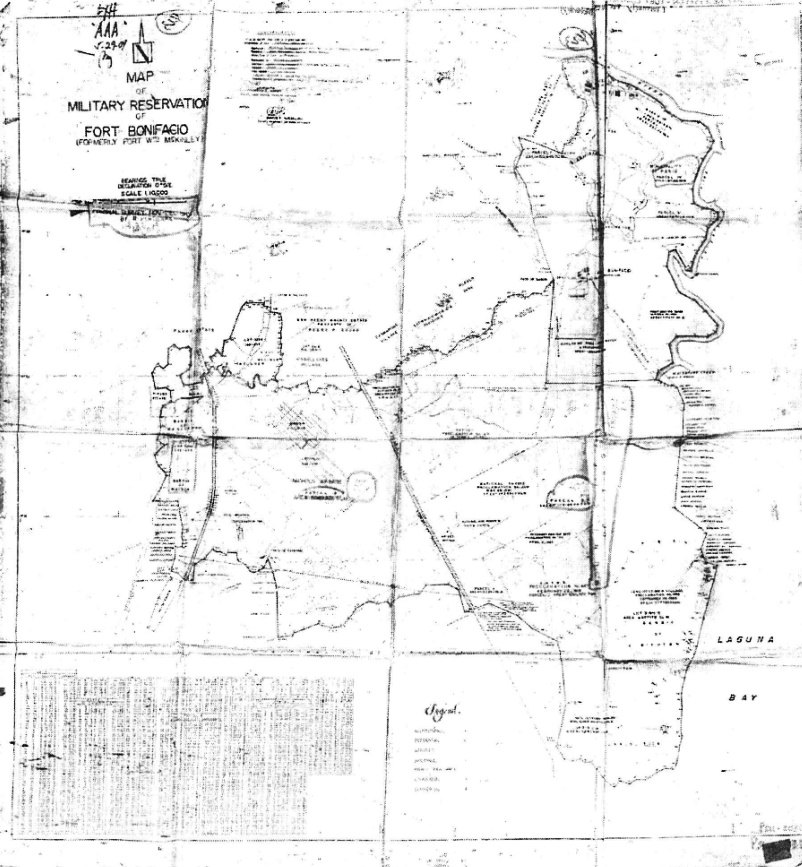
Psu-2031 depicting the extent of the Military Reservation of Fort Bonifacio (formerly Fort McKinley)

After Philippine independence on July 4, 1946, the US surrendered to the Republic of the Philippines all rights of possession, jurisdiction, supervision, and control over the Philippine territory except for the use of their military bases. On May 14, 1949, Fort McKinley was turned over to the Philippine government. The facility became the home of the Philippine Army and later the Philippine Navy and was renamed Fort Bonifacio. It lies in the present-day cities of Pasay, Parañaque, Pasig and Taguig, all former parts of the province of Rizal.

The Manila American Cemetery and Memorial was later established there.

=== Martial law ===
When President Ferdinand Marcos placed the Philippines under martial law in 1972, Fort Bonifacio became the host of three detention centers full of political prisoners - the Ipil Reception Center (sometimes called the Ipil Detention Center), a higher security facility called the Youth Rehabilitation Center (YRC), and the Maximum Security Unit where Senators Jose W. Diokno and Benigno Aquino Jr. were detained.

Ipil was the largest prison facility for political prisoners during martial law. Among the prisoners held there were some of the country's leading academics, creative writers, journalists, and historians including Butch Dalisay, Ricky Lee, Bienvenido Lumbera, Jo Ann Maglipon, Ninotchka Rosca, Zeus Salazar, and William Henry Scott. After Fort Bonifacio was privatized, the area in which Ipil was located became the area near S&R and MC Home Depot at 32nd Street and 8th Avenue in Bonifacio Global City.

The YRC was a higher security prison that housed detainees that included prominent society figures and media personalities, supposed members of the Communist Party of the Philippines, and some known criminals. Journalists imprisoned there included broadcaster Roger Arienda, Manila journalists Rolando Fadul and Bobby Ordoñez, and Bicolano journalist Manny de la Rosa. Society figures Tonypet and Enrique Araneta, Constitutional Commission delegate Manuel Martinez, poet Amado V. Hernandez, and Dr Nemesio Prudente, president of the Philippine College of Commerce (now the Polytechnic University of the Philippines, were all also imprisoned at the YRC. Several Catholic priests were also imprisoned, including Fathers Max de Mesa and Fr Hagad from Jolo, and Jesuit Fr Hilario Lim. The site of YRC was later used as the Makati City Jail.

Senator Benigno Aquino Jr. and Senator Jose Diokno were Marcos' first martial law prisoners, arrested just before midnight on September 22, 1972, and at 1 AM PHT on September 23, 1972, respectively. They were eventually imprisoned in Fort Bonifacio at the Maximum Security Unit separate from the YRC. They stayed there until Marcos moved them to an even higher security facility in Fort Magsaysay in Laur, Nueva Ecija on March 12, 1973. Diokno would remain in solitary confinement at Laur until September 11, 1974, while Aquino would stay in prison until May 5, 1980.

=== Creation of Bonifacio Global City ===
On March 19, 1992, President Corazon Aquino signed the Bases Conversion and Development Act of 1992 (RA 7227) into law, creating the Bases Conversion and Development Authority (BCDA), tasked with converting military bases into "integrated developments, dynamic business centers, and vibrant communities".

On February 3, 1995, the BCDA and a consortium led by Metro Pacific Investments Corporation formed a joint venture called the Fort Bonifacio Development Corporation (FBDC) for the purpose of developing 150 hectares (370 acres) of former Fort Bonifacio land. In the same year, when President Fidel V. Ramos proposed the location of the government center to be at this military base as a conversion, the name would be Aguinaldo, which is named after the country's first president, Emilio Aguinaldo. While the idea was to be located south of Manila, on a 5,000-hectare (12,000-acre) area, a river should traverse the city; proximity to the sea or lake would be desirable; travel time to the nearest airport to have more than 60 minutes; this will also avoid any major fault line, having no buildings and rise high enough to reach 600 feet (180 m), which would make the city green; and a national park would feature a network of smaller parks, gardens, and malls. The private group bought a 55% stake in the FBDC for ₱30.4 billion, while BCDA held on to the remaining 45% stake. The FBDC's landmark project was conceived as Bonifacio Global City, a real estate development area meant to accommodate 250,000 residents and 500,000 daytime workers and visitors. The project was hampered by the 1997 Asian financial crisis, but moved forward when Ayala Land and Evergreen Holdings, Inc. of the Campos(Yao) Group purchased Metro Pacific's controlling stake in FBDC in 2003.

== Gallery ==
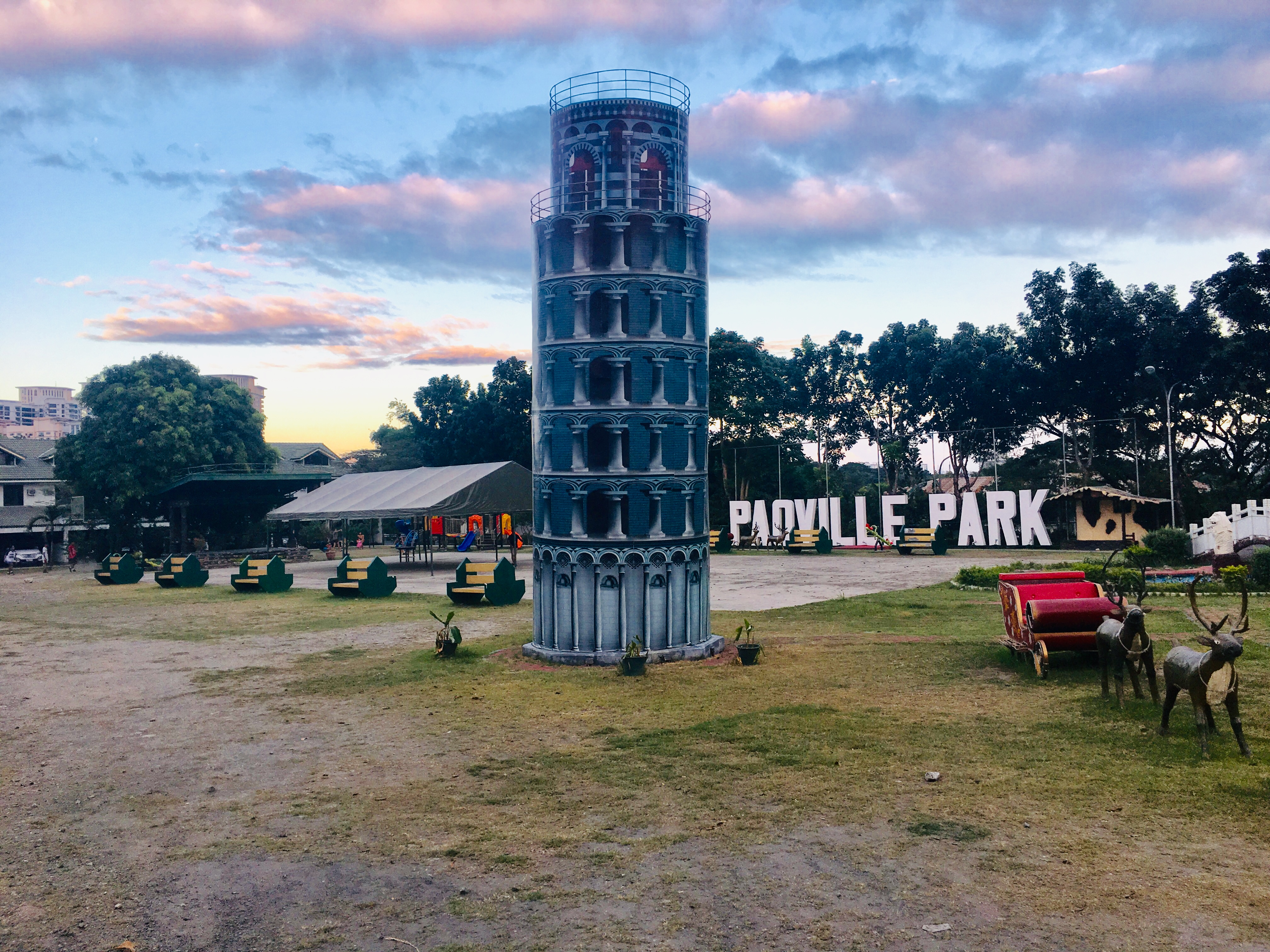
PAOVILLE Park

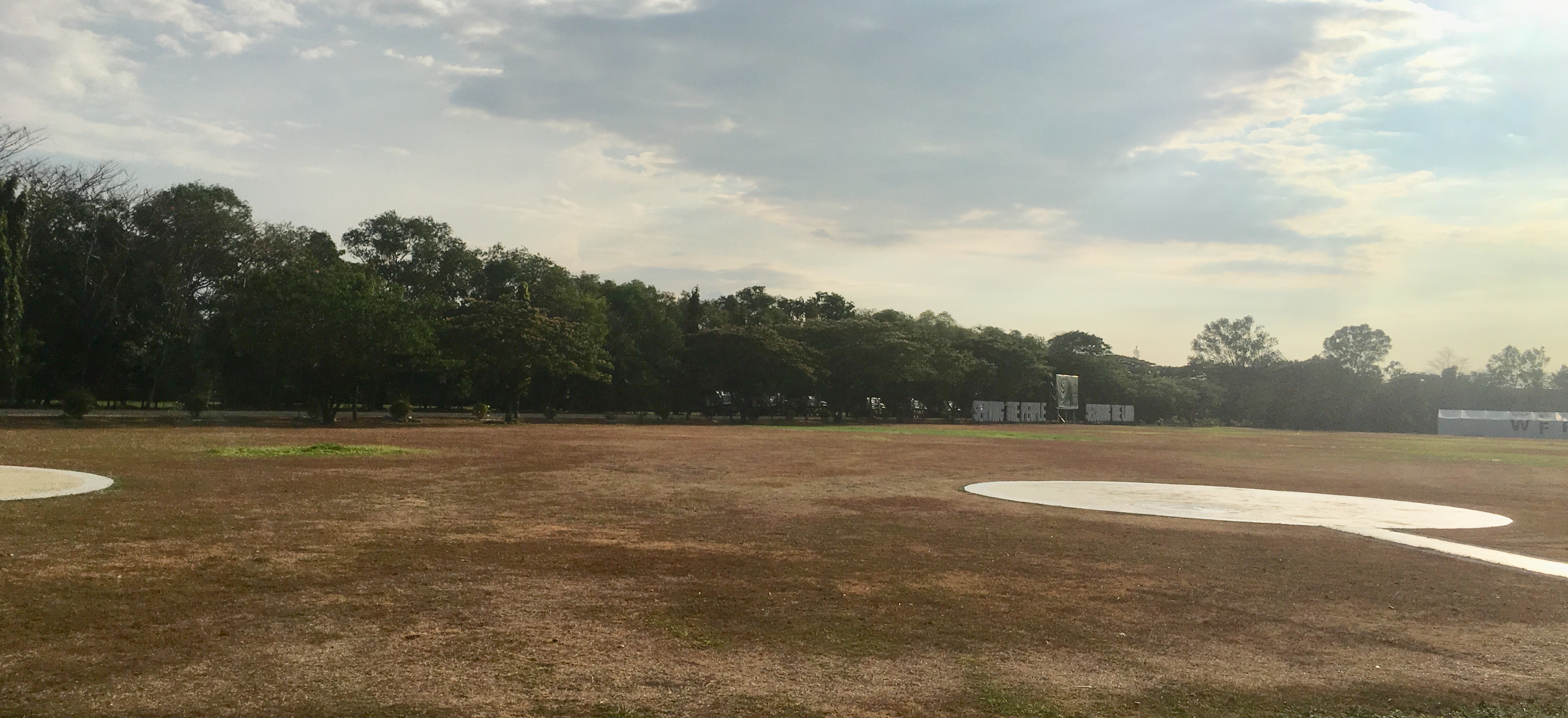
Headquarters Philippine Army (HPA) Grandstand Track Oval

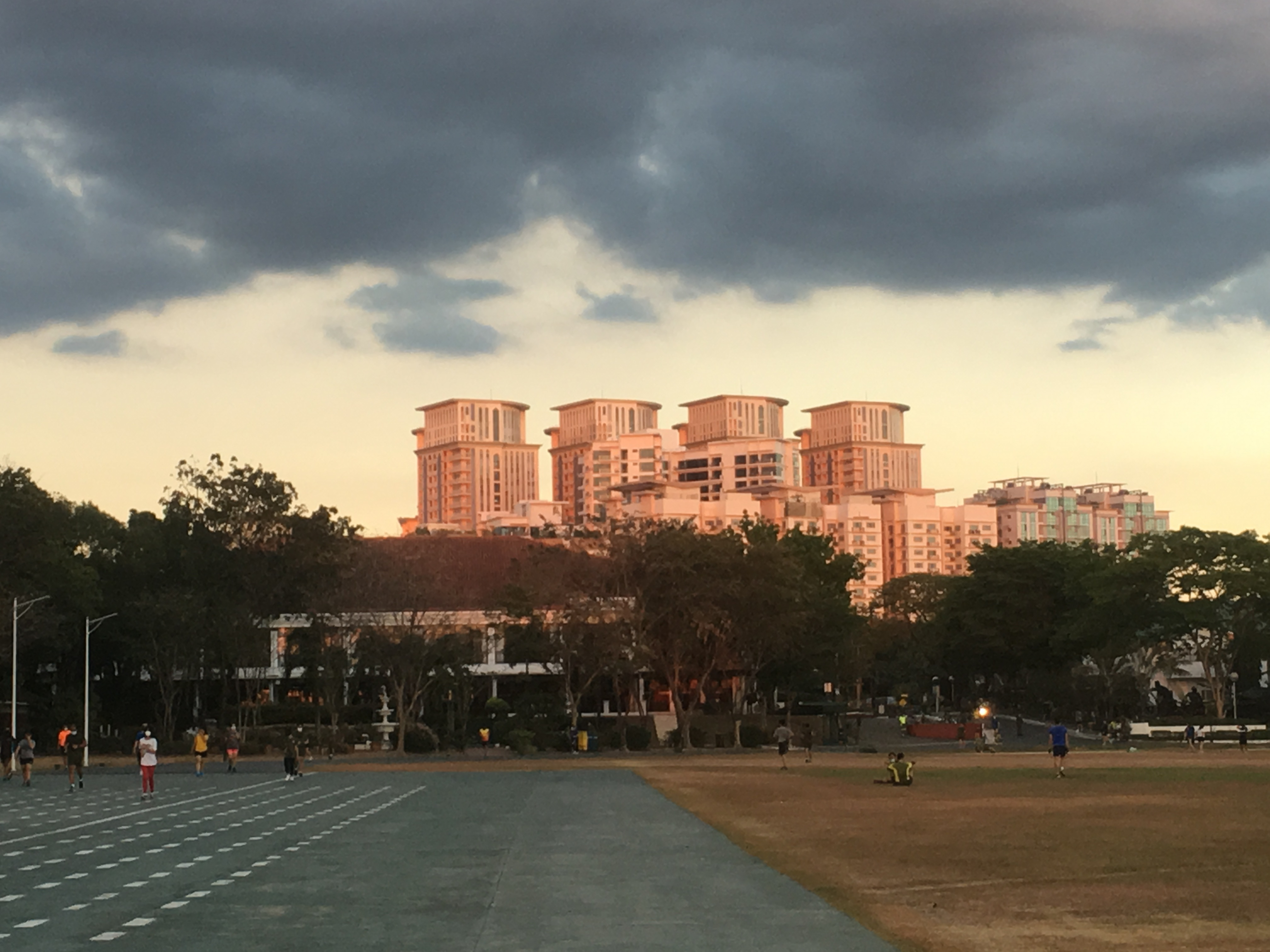
Headquarters Philippine Army (HPA) Grandstand showing the facade of McKinley Hill

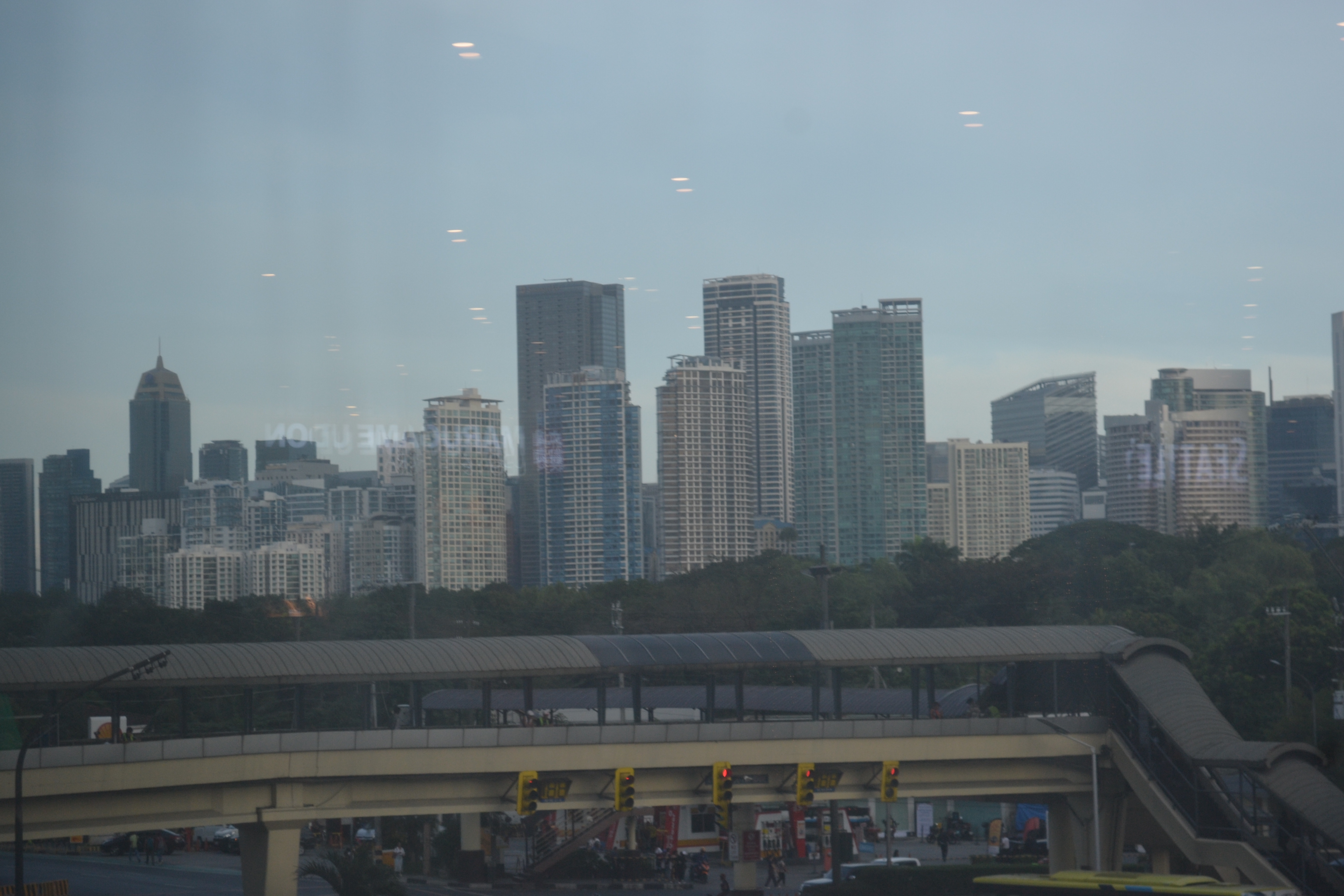
Bonifacio Global City

== See also ==
- Military history of the Philippines
- Military history of the United States
