= Mao Aplasca =

Former Sergeant-at-Arms of the Senate of the Philippines (2026)

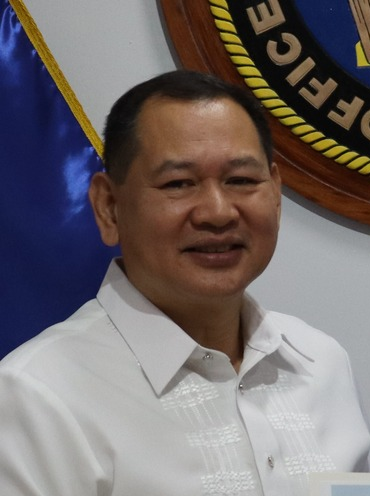
- Portrait of Aplasca as OTS Administrator, 2022

Sergeant-at-Arms of the Senate of the Philippines
- In office May 11, 2026 – May 15, 2026; Suspended from May 15, 2026
- Preceded by: Edgardo Rene Samonte
- Succeeded by: Manuel Parlade (OIC)
- In office July 28, 2025 – February 2, 2026
- Preceded by: Roberto T. Ancan
- Succeeded by: Edgardo Rene Samonte

Sergeant-at-Arms of the Commission on Appointments
- Incumbent
- Assumed office February 4, 2026
- Preceded by: Nicasio Radovan Jr.

Administrator of the Office for Transportation Security
- In office 2022 – September 6, 2023

Sergeant-at-Arms of the House of Representatives of the Philippines
- In office October 12, 2020 – December 6, 2021
- Preceded by: Ramon Apolinario
- Succeeded by: Rodelio Jocson

Personal details
- Born: August 22, 1963 (age 63) Mabini, Davao, Philippines (now Maco, Davao de Oro)
- Education: Philippine Military Academy (BS)
- Police career
- Service: Philippine Constabulary; Philippine National Police
- Division: PC Special Action Force; PNP Public Information Office; Police Regional Office 4A; Police Regional Office 9; Police Regional Office 1; PNP National Headquarters
- Service years: 1987–2019
- Rank: Major General

Mao Ranada Aplasca (born August 22, 1963) is a Filipino former police officer who served as the acting Sergeant-at-Arms of the Senate of the Philippines from May 11 to May 15, 2026, a position he previously held in an official capacity from July 2025 to February 2026. He served as the administrator of the Office for Transportation Security under the Department of Transportation from 2022 to 2023, and as the Sergeant-at-Arms of the House of Representatives of the Philippines from 2020 to 2021.

== Early life and education ==
Aplasca was born on August 22, 1963, in present-day Maco, Davao de Oro, which was then under the jurisdiction of Mabini in the undivided province of Davao. He graduated in Maco Heights Central Elementary School in 1976 and Maco Maryknoll High School in 1980 for his elementary and high school education, respectively. In 1987, he obtained a degree in Bachelor of Science in Management major in Security Studies in the Philippine Military Academy (PMA).

== Police career ==
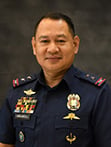
Aplasca as a Police Major General

Aplasca was appointed as the director of the Philippine National Police (PNP) Aviation Security Group in 2016, and director of the Police Regional Office 4A in 2017. He was elevated to the position of Director for Operations in April 2018. He retired from service on August 22, 2019.

== Sergeant-at-Arms of the House of Representatives (2020–2021) ==
On October 12, 2020, Aplasca was elected as the new sergeant-at-arms of the House of Representatives to replace Ramon Apolinario during an assembly of congressmen allied with Lord Allan Velasco, whom they installed as House speaker on the same day in a special session at the Celebrity Sports Plaza in Quezon City amid a crisis in the speakership. He resigned from the post less than two months later on December 6, 2021, and was succeeded by retired Police Brigadier General Rodelio Jocson.

== Administrator of the Office for Transportation Security (2022–2023) ==
After his brief stint in the House of Representatives, newly-elected President Bongbong Marcos appointed Aplasca as administrator of the Office for Transportation Security (OTS) in 2022, and served in the position until his resignation in 2023 following a scandal involving an OTS personnel swallowing stolen money from a passenger in the Ninoy Aquino International Airport.

== Sergeant-at-Arms of the Senate (2025–2026; acting, 2026) ==
On the opening of the 20th Congress in July 2025, Aplasca was elected sergeant-at-arms of the Senate upon being nominated by Senator Ronald dela Rosa, a batchmate of his in the PMA. He was succeeded by Edgardo Rene Samonte in February 2026, and was subsequently elected sergeant-at-arms of the Commission on Appointments.

Aplasca was designated as the acting sergeant-at-arms of the Senate on May 11, 2026, upon the resignation of Samonte, amidst the attempted arrest of Senator Ronald dela Rosa on the same day after agents of the National Bureau of Investigation (NBI) and former Senator Antonio Trillanes IV came to the Senate to implement an alleged warrant of the International Criminal Court (ICC) against dela Rosa for his role in the Duterte administration's war on drugs. His reinstatement was moved by dela Rosa himself and approved by a majority of the senators. He gained widespread media coverage for being involved in the alleged shootout between members of the Office of the Sergeant-at-Arms and alleged armed men attempting to enter the Senate, reported to have been "perceived NBI agents," in a renewed effort to arrest dela Rosa.

After the incident, Interior Secretary Jonvic Remulla said initial findings indicate there was no attack on Senate and that Aplasca fired the first shots. Based on CCTV fotoage, Remulla noted that Aplasca fired shots towards an area "with no direct threat to him."

Aplasca was suspended by the Office of the Ombudsman from his duties on May 15, 2026. In June 2, 2026, Aplasca was issued subpoenas by the National Bureau of Investigation, alongside three others in connection with the escape of Senator Ronald "Bato" dela Rosa (wanted by the International Criminal Court for extrajudicial killings during the Philippine drug war) hours after the alleged shootout. In June 3, 2026, the rights group Tindig Pilipinas filed a complaint of obstruction of justice against Aplasca and four others in the Office of the Ombudsman, also in connection to de la Rosa's escape.
