= Arrests of senators in the Philippine Senate =

The arrests of senators within the physical premises of the Senate building complex by law enforcement have occurred on several occasions, while the legality of such arrests has been a subject of public interest.

Senators Juan Ponce Enrile, Leila de Lima, Antonio Trillanes, and Jinggoy Estrada voluntarily surrendered to authorities after remaining within the Senate premises for a period following the issuance of warrants for their arrest.

== Background ==
=== Parliamentary immunity ===
As per Article VI, Section 11 of the 1987 Constitution, Senators are granted parliamentary immunity or privilege from being arrested for offenses punishable by not more than six years of imprisonment. A senator cannot be arrested who qualifies while the Senate is in session. This is intended to allow legislators to work without fear of prosecution, civil or criminal.

=== Tradition and legality ===
There is a tradition or institutional courtesy within the Senate which insists that its members cannot be arrested within its premises as a sign of respect to the institution. It was started with Senate President Jovito Salonga in 1990. In effect, some accused Senators took refuge in the Senate premises to delay or evade arrest.

== List of arrests ==
=== Successful arrests ===
==== Juan Ponce Enrile (1990) ====
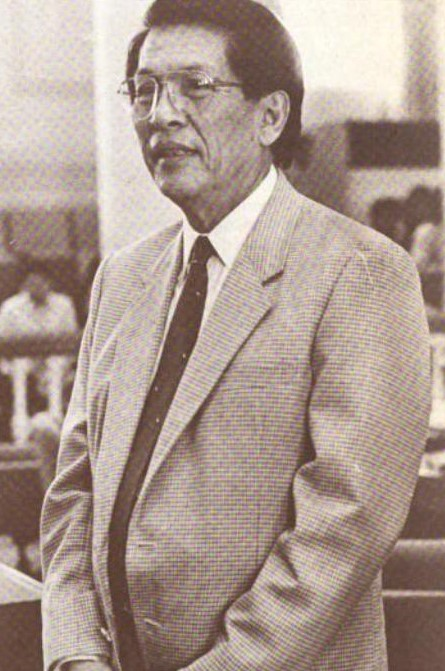
Juan Ponce Enrile in 1988.

Senator Juan Ponce Enrile was indicted for his alleged role in the 1989 Philippine coup attempt. The National Bureau of Investigation (NBI) led by Director Alfredo Lim attempted to implement a warrant of arrest against Enrile on February 17, 1990. Senate President Jovito Salonga objected to the warrant implementation and instructed Senate security to bare NBI agents to enter the building. While inside the Senate building Enrile gave a speech that the charges against him was fabricated by the administration of President Corazon Aquino. He later surrendered to the NBI outside the Senate premises.

Enrile was appointed as Aquino's defense secretary after the latter was installed as president following the February 1986 People Power Revolution. He resigned in November 1986 after he was implicated in the an earlier coup attempt

Enrile was able to post bail a week later with the Supreme Court invalidating the charges in June 1990.

==== Leila de Lima (2017) ====
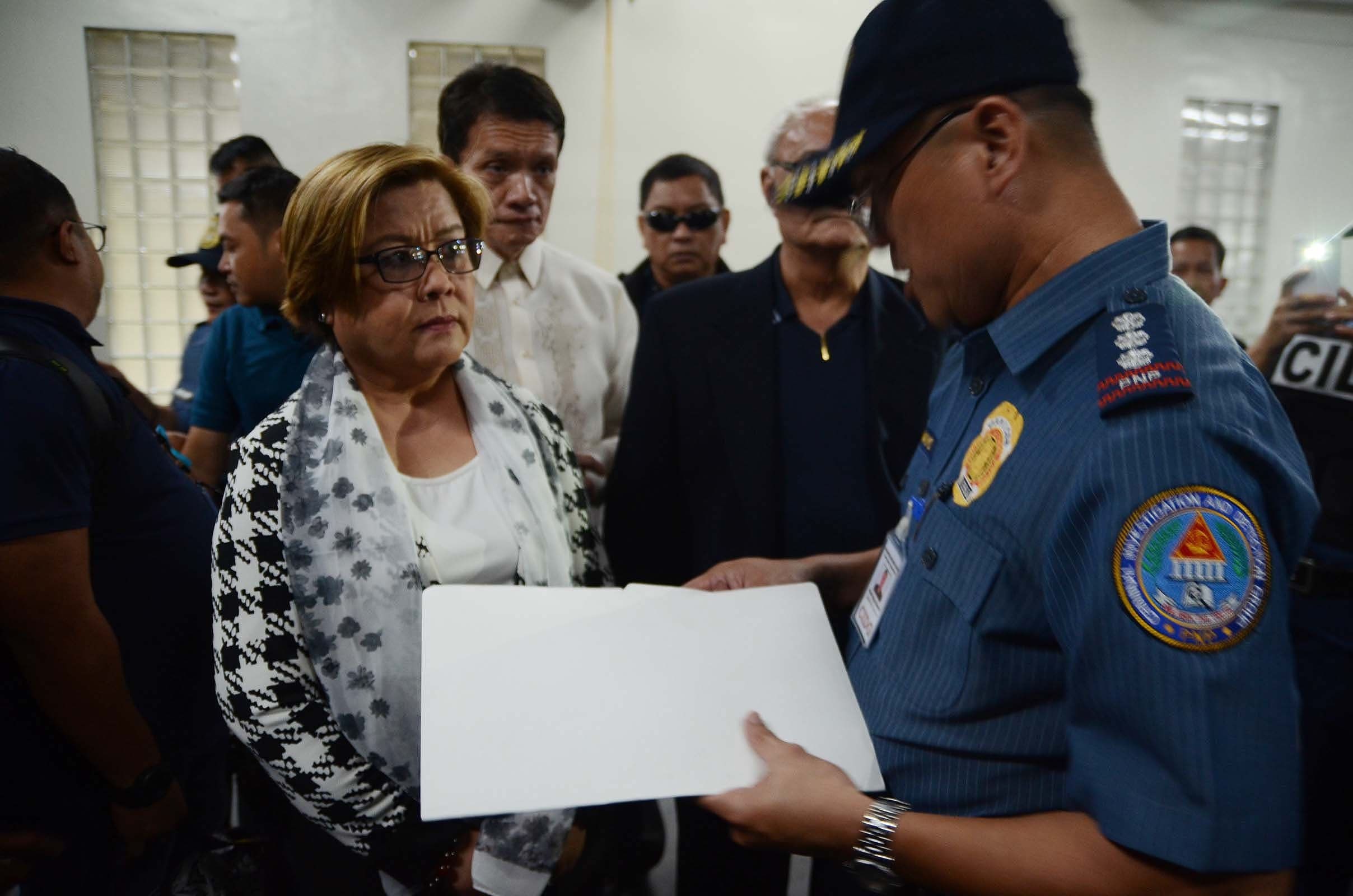
Arrest of de Lima.

Senator Leila de Lima a critic of President Rodrigo Duterte and his war on drugs campaign was charged with drug-related offense. The warrant was issued on February 23, 2017. She was accused of allowing and profiting from the illegal drug trade within the New Bilibid Prison during her tenure as justice secretary. The next day, De Lima voluntarily stepped out of the Senate building to allow for her arrest.

De Lima was released on bail in November 2023, after being cleared of two drug charges. She was later cleared of all charges in June 2024.

==== Antonio Trillanes (2018) ====
Senator Antonio Trillanes was arrested on September 25, 2018, after a Makati court issued a warrant arrest against him. He sought refuge in the Senate building for since early that month.

President Rodrigo Duterte issued Proclamation No. 572 which voided Trillanes' amnesty for his role in the Oakwood mutiny in 2003 and Manila Peninsula siege in 2007 for allegedly failing to fulfill the requirements. President Benigno Aquino III originally gave Trillanes amnesty in 2011. He was allowed to post bail and a decision was deferred on a second case. He was able to leave the Senate on September 29, 2018.

In 2024, the Supreme Court affirmed the validity of Trillanes' amnesty and voided Duterte's order.

==== Jinggoy Estrada (2026) ====
On June 1, 2026, Senator Jinggoy Estrada surrendered to authorities after the Sandiganbayan issued an arrest warrant against him in a non-bailable plunder case related to allegations arising from the flood control projects scandal in the Philippines.

Senate President Alan Peter Cayetano and the majority bloc protested the arrest in heated exchange with Interior Secretary Jonvic Remulla who personally served the warrant of arrest, citing the independence of the Senate, but the authorities proceeded with serving the warrant anyway. Secretary Remulla maintained that the executive branch may arrest members of the legislative branch despite the separation of powers between the two branches of government and that the Senate lost the privilege of extending protection of a senator facing arrest, citing the earlier case involving Ronald dela Rosa, who was able to escape the Senate premises earlier in the previous month.

=== Attempted arrests ===
==== Jinggoy Estrada (2006) ====
Eight-member team of the Pasig City Police attempted to serve a warrant of arrest against Senator Jinggoy Estrada on August 15, 2006. First Gentleman and husband of President Gloria Macapagal Arroyo, Mike Arroyo filed a libel case against Estrada after the senator linked him to significant smuggling operations. Senate President Manny Villar invoked the parliamentary immunity and prevented Estrada's arrest. The following day, Justice secretary Raul M. Gonzalez ordered the suspension of the proceedings of the libel case. On August 24, the Pasig police apologized to Estrada for the attempted arrest.

==== Ronald dela Rosa (2026) ====
CCTV footage of the Senate showing Dela Rosa being chased by NBI agents inside the Senate premises.

Senator Ronald dela Rosa was charged by the International Criminal Court (ICC) of crimes against humanity and was linked to killings in the Philippine drug war when he was still the Philippine National Police chief under President Rodrigo Duterte. The warrant is issued in secret on November 6, 2025, although it has already been publicized informally by justice secretary Jesus Crispin Remulla sometime within that month.

Dela Rosa went into hiding only to resurface on May 11, 2026, to take part in a leadership change vote within the Senate which replaced Tito Sotto with Alan Peter Cayetano as senate president in the lead up to the second impeachment of Sara Duterte.

Prior to the vote, NBI agents accompanied by Antonio Trillanes attempted to arrest Dela Rosa. A CCTV footage was presented by the Senate as an evidence, showing Dela Rosa running from NBI operatives who were chasing him when he entered the Senate building. The ICC also unsealed the warrant within that day.

The Senate placed the entire building into a full lockdown, prohibiting all individuals inside the premises to exit the building. It was lifted later on the evening.

Dela Rosa was then placed under Senate "protective custody". Consequently, the NBI agents who attempted to arrest Dela Rosa were cited in contempt by the Senate as soon as surveillance footages were presented at the plenary.

Dela Rosa insist that a warrant issued by a Philippine court is the only warrant validly enforceable. Former Senator Leila de Lima disputes this interpretation, stating that Republic Act No. 9851 or the Philippine Act on Crimes Against International Humanitarian Law, Genocide, and Other Crimes Against Humanity already recognizes warrants issued by international tribunals. The Office of the President also referenced the same law, while also reminded the Senate that parliamentary immunity has limits.

== See also ==
- Parliamentary privilege
- Diplomatic immunity
- Sanctuary
- List of people who took refuge in a diplomatic mission
