= Southern Police District =

Police command in the Southern Metro Manila

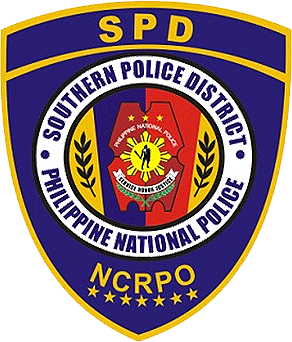
- Logo
- Common name: Southern Police District
- Abbreviation: SPD

Agency overview
- Formed: August 8, 1975
- Preceding agency: List; Las Piñas Police Department (until 1975); Makati Police Department (until 1975); Muntinlupa Police Department (until 1975); Parañaque Police Department (until 1975); Pateros Police Department (until 1975); Pasay Police Department (until 1975); Taguig Police Department (until 1975)

Jurisdictional structure
- Operations jurisdiction: Las Piñas, Makati, Muntinlupa, Parañaque, Pateros, Pasay, Taguig

Operational structure
- Headquarters: Fort Bonifacio, Taguig, Metro Manila
- Agency executive: PBGEN Glenn Olivier C. Cinco, District Director
- Parent agency: National Capital Region Police Office

Facilities
- Stations: 7 city police stations

Website
- spd.ncrpo.pnp.gov.ph

The Southern Police District (SPD) is the police district of the Philippine National Police within the National Capital Region Police Office comprising six cities and one municipality — Makati, Taguig, Pasay, Muntinlupa, Las Piñas, Parañaque and Pateros. The headquarters located at Fort Bonifacio, Taguig.

== History ==
The Southern Police District was established on August 14, 1974 when Juan Ponce Enrile, then Secretary of National Defense and Acting Chairman of the National Police Commission approved the Rules and regulations governing the Metropolitan Police Force, as promulgated by the C, PC/INP for implementation and publication. Forming part of the Metropolitan Force (MPF) created under Presidential Decree Number 421 issued by the late President Ferdinand Marcos and in conformity with the provision of Headquarters PC/INP Letter Directive dated September 28, 1976, the Southern Police District had its operational jurisdiction over the cities of Makati, Parañaque, Las Piñas and Pasay.

On December 13, 1990, the Philippine Congress enacted into Law Republic Act 6975, PNP Law of 1990 signed by President Corazon Aquino placing the newly organized PNP under the Department of Interior and Local Government with the aim of professionalizing the PNP. Under the new law, the Capital Command will be divided into North and South, with the SPD allocated to the latter. But the Capital Command merged into one by 1994, and now currently known as National Capital Region Police Office since 1996.

In a survey conducted in 2008, SPD was the lowest among NCR police units, due to some of its officers being notorious as "kotong" cops.

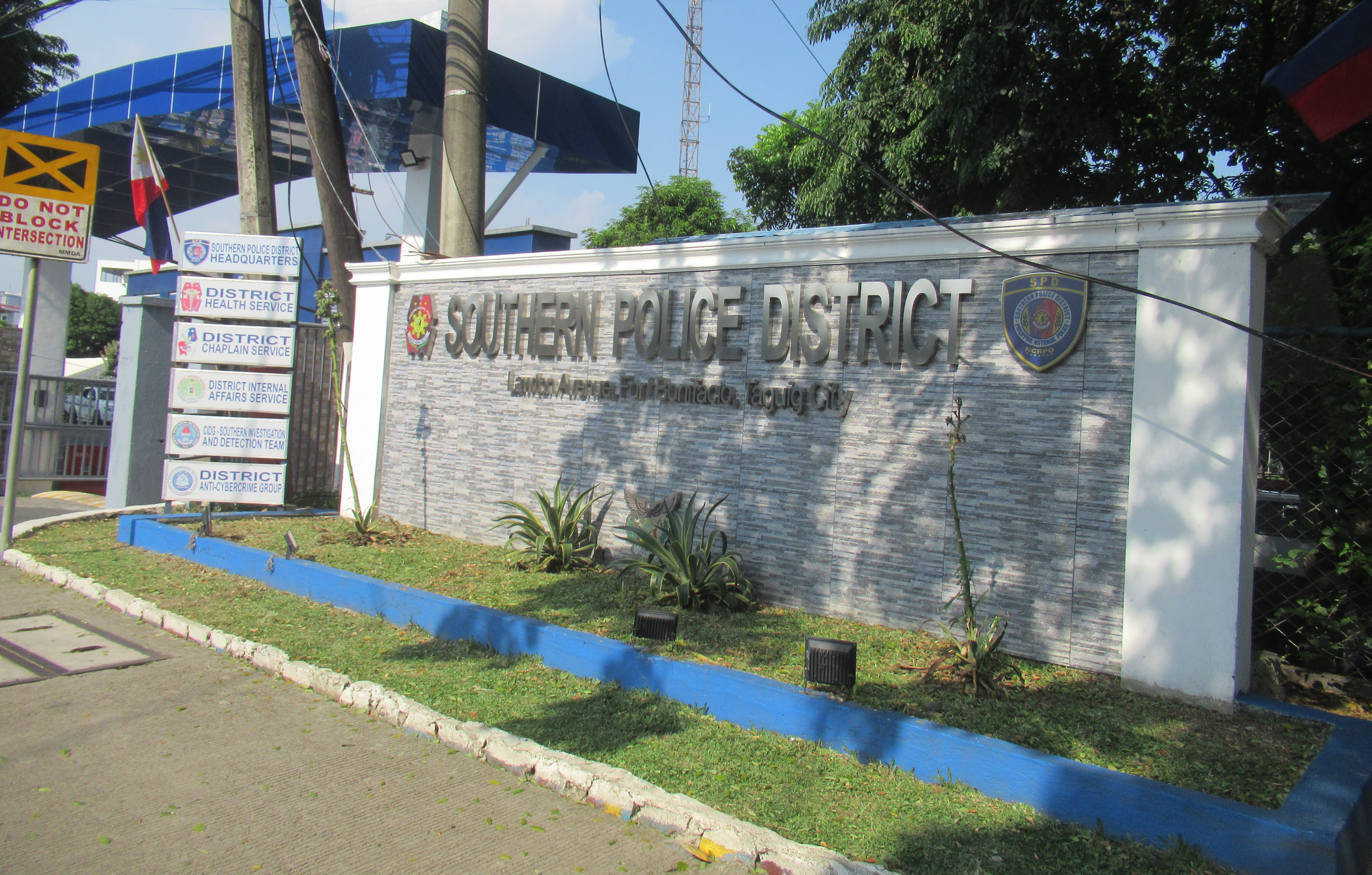
The facade of the headquarters

== Composition ==
It is considerably the biggest district among the five (5) police districts of the National Capital Region Police Office. It is composed of six (6) cities and one (1) municipality, namely: Makati, Taguig, Pasay, Muntinlupa, Las Piñas, Parañaque and Pateros. It envelops the Southern Part of the National Capital Region which covers 233.2 square kilometers, with 317 Barangays and 11 Congressional Districts, having a total of 3,809,535 population based on the 2010 census, giving SPD a police population ratio of 1:1, 168.

SPD spearheading the drive to Performance Governance System (PGS) certification among the Districts of the National Capital Region Police Office (NCRPO). Itw conferment with the Silver Eagle Award during the initiated Status held on February 18, 2014 paved the way to open doors to renew commitment and dedication as public servants as look back to the challenges that successfully hurdled as a team.

These strides were made possible with the partnership between and among the Local Government Units, Non-Government Organizations, Community and Southern Police District who worked together to follow best practices for continual improvement in many areas.

== Lists of chiefs ==
The following list only started from 2000:

Name	Term	Notes
Orlando Macaspac	1992 – 1993	
As chief of the Southern Police District
Manuel Cabigon	2000 – 2001	
Jose Gutierrez	2001 – 2004	
Wilfredo Garcia	2004 – 2005	
Frudencio Regis	2005 – 2006	
Ricardo Padilla	2006	Acting
Roberto Rosales	2006 – 2007	
Leon Nilo dela Cruz	2007 – 2008	OIC
Luizo Ticman	2008	
Jaime Calungsod	2008 – 2010	
Jose Arne de los Santos	2010 – 2012	
Benito Estipona	2012 – 2013	
James Melad	2013	
Jose Erwin Villacorte	2013 – 2014	
Henry Rañola	2014 – 2016	
Tomas Apolinario	2016 – 2018	
Eliseo DC Cruz	2018 – 2019	First tour of duty
Nolasco Bathan	2019 – 2021	
Eliseo DC Cruz	2021	Second tour of duty
Jimili Macareg	2021 – 2022	
Kirby John B Kraft	2022 – 2023	
Roderick Mariano	2022 – Oct 21, 2023	
Mark Danglait Pespes	Oct 21, 2023 – May 8, 2024	
Leon Victor Rosete	May 2024 – September 30, 2024	Acting
Bernard Yang	September 30, 2024 – December 20, 2024	
Manuel Abrugena	December 20, 2024 – April 7, 2025	
Joseph R. Arguelles	April 7, 2025 – June 19, 2025	
Randy Y. Arceo	June 19, 2025 – April 7, 2026	
Glenn Oliver C. Cinco	April 7, 2026 – present	

== Units ==
=== Headquarters ===
Under the Director, SPD it has:

- Deputy District Director for Administration
- Deputy District Director for Operation
- Chief District Directorial Staff
- Secretary to Directorial Staff
- Office of the District Executive Senior Police Office

The administrative divisions are:

- District Personnel and Records Management Division
- District Logistic Division
- District Comptrollership Division

The operational divisions and units are:

- District Intelligence Division
- District Operation and Plans Division
- District Community Affairs and Development Division
- District Investigative and Detective Management Division
- District Drug Enforcement Unit
- District Headquarters Support Unit
- District Mobile Force Battalion
- District Traffic Enforcement Unit
- District Special Operation Unit
- Anti-Carnapping Unit
- District Tactical Motorized Unit

=== Stations ===
- Las Piñas City Police Station
- Makati City Police Station
- Muntinlupa City Police Station
- Parañaque City Police Station
- Pateros Police Station
- Pasay City Police Station
- Taguig City Police Station

== Controversies ==
=== Phone grabbing against Jun Veneracion ===
On January 10, 2020, General Nolasco Bathan grabbed the smartphone of GMA reporter Jun Veneracion, and said that he see what Veneracion did as a threat. Later on, he returned the smartphone and apologized.

== See also ==
- National Capital Region Police Office
  - Eastern Police District
  - Northern Police District
  - Manila Police District
  - Quezon City Police District
