= Office for Transportation Security =

Agency of the Philippine government

- Opisina para sa Seguridad ng Transportasyon

Agency overview
- Formed: January 30, 2004; 22 years ago
- Type: Security services, screening services, regulatory agency
- Headquarters: Aurora Boulevard corner Andrews Avenue, Pasay, Philippines
- Employees: 172 (2024)
- Agency executives: Usec. Gilberto D.C. Cruz, Administrator; Asec. Jose A. Briones Jr., Deputy Administrator
- Parent agency: Department of Transportation
- Website: ots.gov.ph

The Office for Transportation Security (OTS; Filipino: Tanggapan Para sa Seguridad ng Transportasyon) is the sole authority responsible for the security of the transportation systems in the Philippines, including civil aviation, maritime transportation, land transportation, rail systems, and related infrastructure.

== History ==
Up until the Second World War, the conduct of commercial aviation activities between countries was based mainly on bilateral arrangements because there was a prevailing “unqualified national sovereignty” over airspace. With the Second World War coming to an end, interested parties met in Chicago in late 1944 to draw up a new treaty to allow more open access for the conduct of international air commerce. The result of this meeting was the Convention on International Civil Aviation (or Chicago Convention), establishing the International Civil Aviation Organization (ICAO). This convention has the objective of providing an agreement on principles and arrangements governing international civil aviation in the interest of safe navigation of the skies. It has close to universal acceptance with 188 signatory or Contracting States

The Philippines, having ratified the Convention on International Civil Aviation on March 1, 1947 and being one of the 188 Contracting States (as of June 2002) of the ICAO, is bound to comply with the international standards of safeguarding civil aviation against acts of unlawful interference, including global terrorism. Specifically stated in Standard 3.1.2 of the ICAO Annex 17, Amendment 11: “Each Contracting State shall designate and specify to ICAO an appropriate authority within its administration to be responsible for the development, implementation and maintenance of the national civil aviation security programme."

On January 30, 2004, President Gloria Macapagal Arroyo issued Executive Order No. 277 creating the Office for Transportation Security (OTS) within the Department of Transportation Communication and reconstituting the National Council for Civil Aviation Security (NCCAS) to the National Civil Aviation Security Committee (NCASC). And as response to the international mandate calling for a single authority for securing all modes of transportation in the Philippines per the ICAO and IM0 guidelines, the President issued Executive Order No. 311 on April 26, 2004, designating the OTS as the single authority called for and thereto expanding its powers and functions.

To effectively carry out its mandate of securing the transportation systems against terrorism, OTS was organized into the three following Transportation Security Bureaus:

• 1. Civil Aviation Security Bureau (CASB)

• 2. Maritime Transportation Security Bureau (MTSB)

• 3. Land Transportation Security Bureau (LTSB)

together with the three following Support Bureaus:

• 1. Intelligence and Operations Bureau (IOB)

• 2. Administrative and Finance Bureau (AFB)

• 3. Legal and Planning Bureau (LPB).
