= Impeachment trial of Sara Duterte =

2026 trial in the Philippine Senate

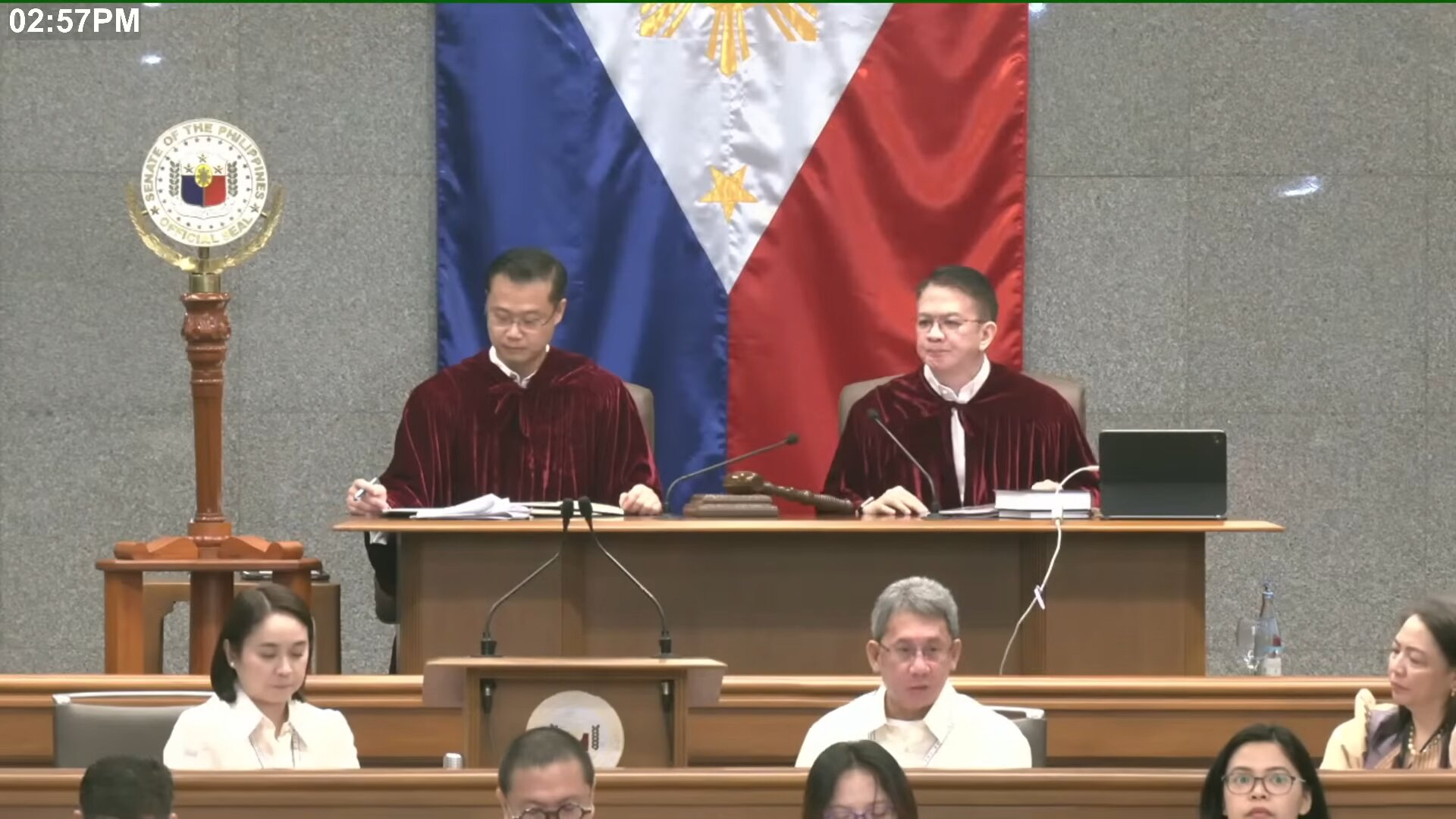
- Francis Escudero (right) presides over the impeachment trial of Sara Duterte, seated beside Senate president Sherwin Gatchalian (left)
- Accused: Sara Duterte, Vice President of the Philippines
- Presiding officer: Francis Escudero
- Date: July 6, 2026 – present (18 weeks and 4 days)
- Charges: 1: Betrayal of public trust; 2: Culpable violation of the Constitution; 3: Graft and corruption; 4: Bribery

The impeachment trial of Sara Duterte, the 15th vice president of the Philippines, began on July 6, 2026. Duterte had been impeached for a second time by the House of Representatives on May 11, 2026. She was the first vice president of the Philippines to be impeached, and the first to be impeached twice. The articles of impeachment alleged betrayal of public trust, culpable violation of the Constitution, graft and corruption, and bribery arising from the alleged misuse of the funds for the Office of the Vice President and the Department of Education (DepEd), where Duterte served as secretary from 2022 to 2024; unexplained wealth; alleged monetary gifts and payments to DepEd officials; and alleged threats to assassinate President Bongbong Marcos, First Lady Liza Araneta Marcos, and former House Speaker Martin Romualdez.

What would have been Duterte's first Senate impeachment trial was postponed after the impeachment court announced that the proceedings would resume only after the prosecution panel had been reconstituted, following the loss of several members of the 19th Congress in the 2025 elections or their assumption of office in other government posts. The articles of impeachment were subsequently declared null and void by the Supreme Court in July 2025, followed by the Senate impeachment court's decision to archive them in August 2025.

Senate President Sherwin Gatchalian opened the session on the first day of the trial, after which he called for the election of a presiding officer. On June 3, 2026, the Senate had amended Rule II of its rules of procedure on impeachment trials to allow the election, by majority vote, of a senator other than the Senate president as the court's presiding officer. Francis Escudero, who had presided over Duterte's first impeachment trial as Senate president in 2025, was elected to the position. The amendment was challenged by Senator-Judge Alan Peter Cayetano, who argued that the court could not amend a constitutional requirement that the Senate president preside over impeachment trials. Several other minority senators likewise objected, delaying the start of the trial by approximately one hour.

Members of the House prosecution panel include Representatives Gerville Luistro (lead prosecutor), Kaka Bag-ao, Joel Chua, Leila de Lima, Lorenz Defensor, Chel Diokno, Jonathan Keith Flores, Rodge Gutierrez, Terry Ridon, Lordan Suan, and Bel Zamora. Duterte's defense team is led by litigator Sheila Sison.

== Background ==
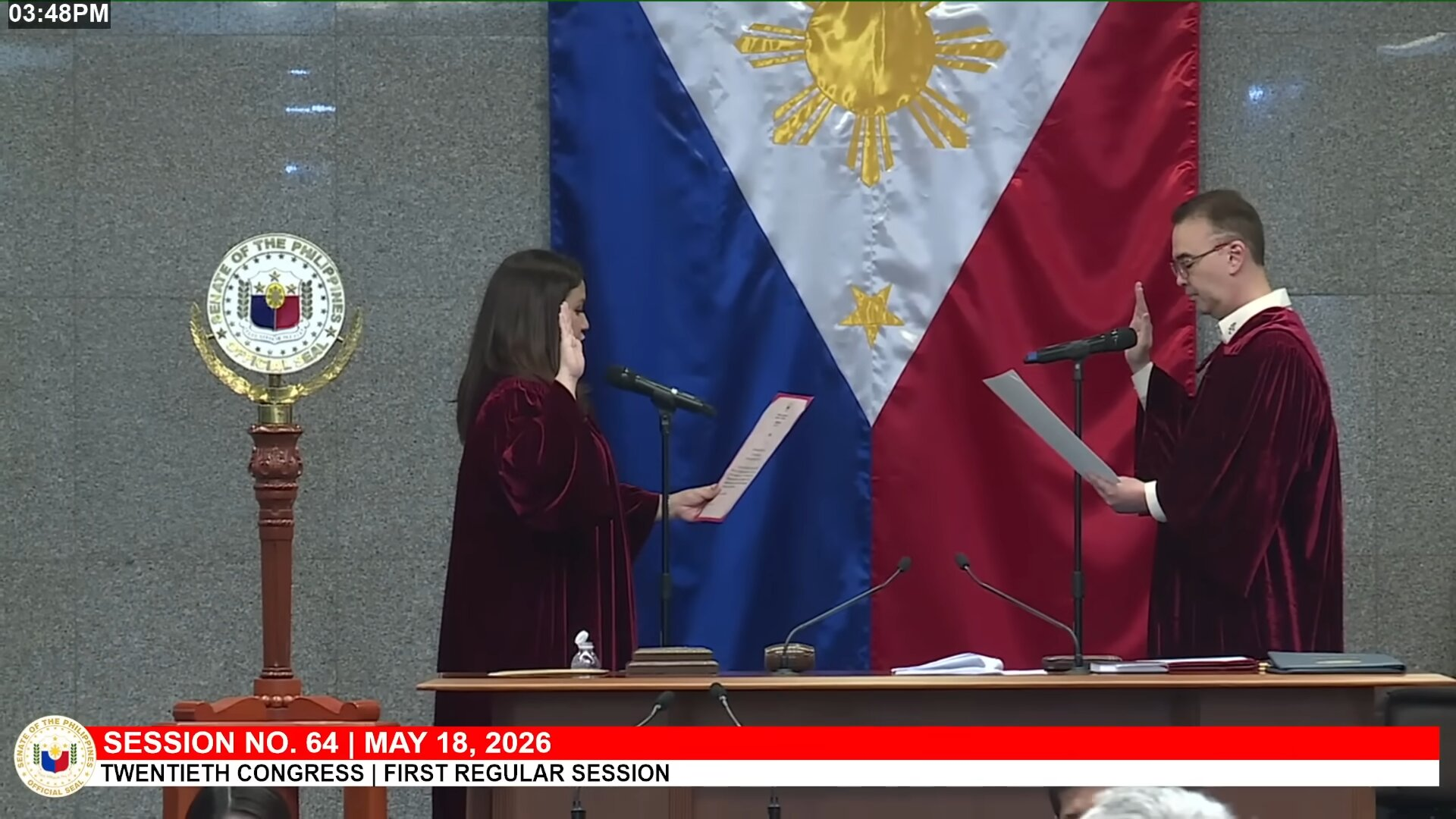
Senate President Alan Peter Cayetano (right) takes his oath before Senator Camille Villar (left) as the presiding officer of the Senate impeachment court for the trial of Vice President Sara Duterte on May 18, 2026.

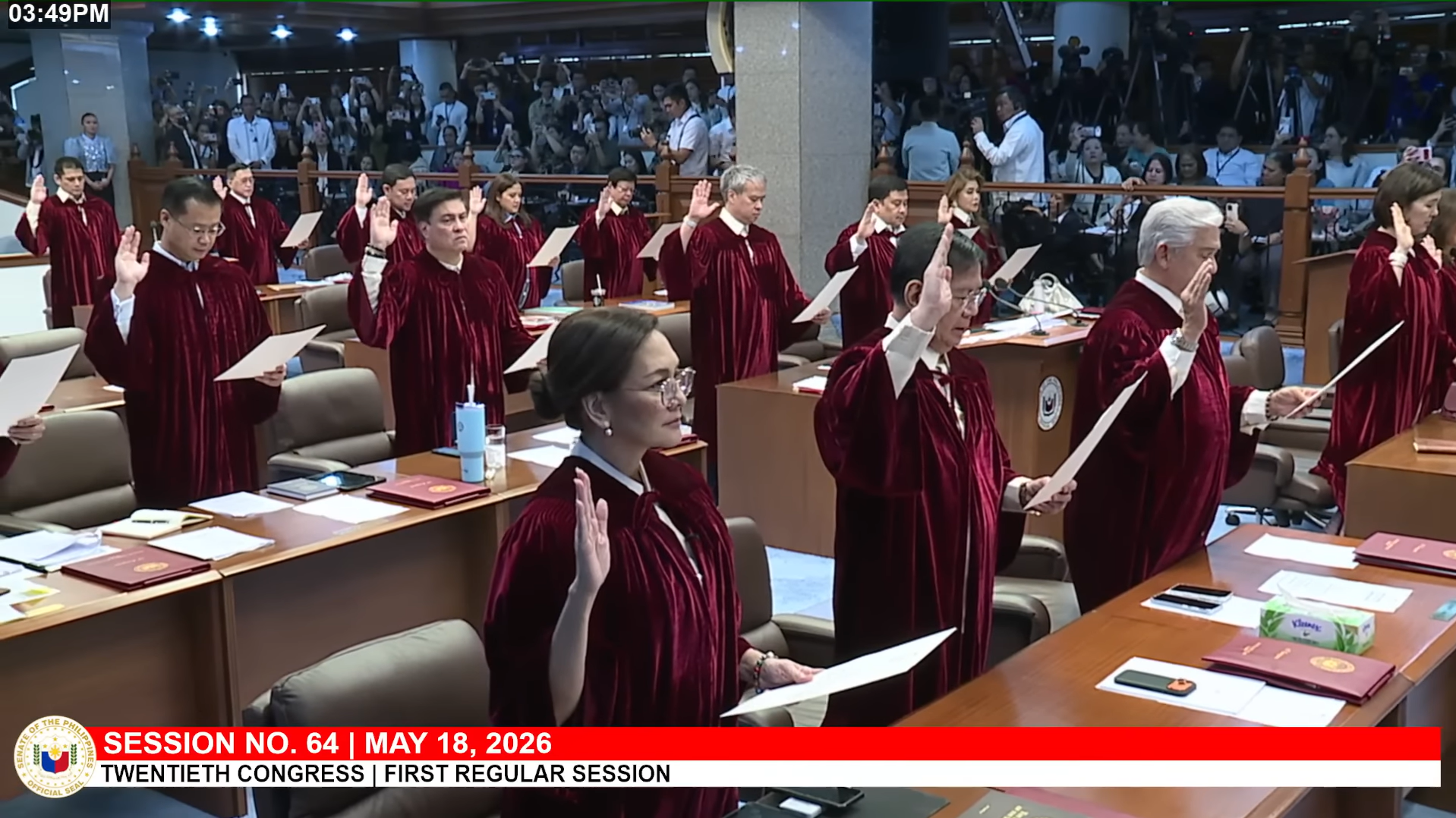
The Senate convened as the impeachment court on May 18, 2026, with senators taking their oaths as senator-judges

Before he was ousted as Senate president, Tito Sotto stated that the Senate would act as soon as possible if the House of Representatives transmitted the articles of impeachment to the upper chamber. Sotto said that the Senate could convene as an impeachment court as early as May 4, 2026. On April 30, 2026, several senators met to discuss the possible impeachment trial. Senator Win Gatchalian said that if Duterte were impeached on May 11, 2026, the Senate could convene as an impeachment court on May 13 if the articles of impeachment were transmitted the following day. However, on May 11, 2026, Sotto was ousted and replaced by Senate minority leader Alan Peter Cayetano.

On May 13, 2026, the House of Representatives announced that the articles of impeachment against Vice President Sara Duterte had been transmitted to the Senate. In a convoy from the lower chamber, the House secretary general and sergeant-at-arms delivered House Resolution No. 989, containing Committee Report No. 261 and the articles of impeachment, to the Senate at 19:22 PHT, where they were received by the Senate sergeant-at-arms. The documents arrived amid ongoing tensions within the Senate premises that same evening.

The following day, Senate President Alan Peter Cayetano confirmed that the articles of impeachment had been transmitted to the Senate and stated that he had ordered the Secretariat to include them in the Senate calendar for referral to the impeachment court, which was scheduled to convene on May 18, 2026.

The Senate convened as an impeachment court as scheduled on May 18. Prior to this, Cayetano reportedly survived an attempt to remove him as Senate president, while Juan Miguel Zubiri and JV Ejercito joined the minority bloc. Cayetano led the majority bloc with 13 members, while the minority increased its membership to 11. Ronald dela Rosa was the only absent senator.

On May 21, 2026, Senator Erwin Tulfo announced that Duterte's impeachment trial is set to begin on July 6, following an agreement during a Senate caucus of all Senators.

On June 3, 2026, a coalition of the minority bloc and Senator Francis Escudero convened a session attended by 12 senators, which constituted a quorum. During the session, the senators voted to declare all elective positions in the Senate vacant, resulting in the removal of Senate President Cayetano. As no candidate obtained the support of at least 13 senators required to be elected Senate president, Sherwin Gatchalian was elected president pro tempore and assumed the role of acting Senate president until the election of a new Senate president.

== Officers of the trial ==
=== Presiding officer ===
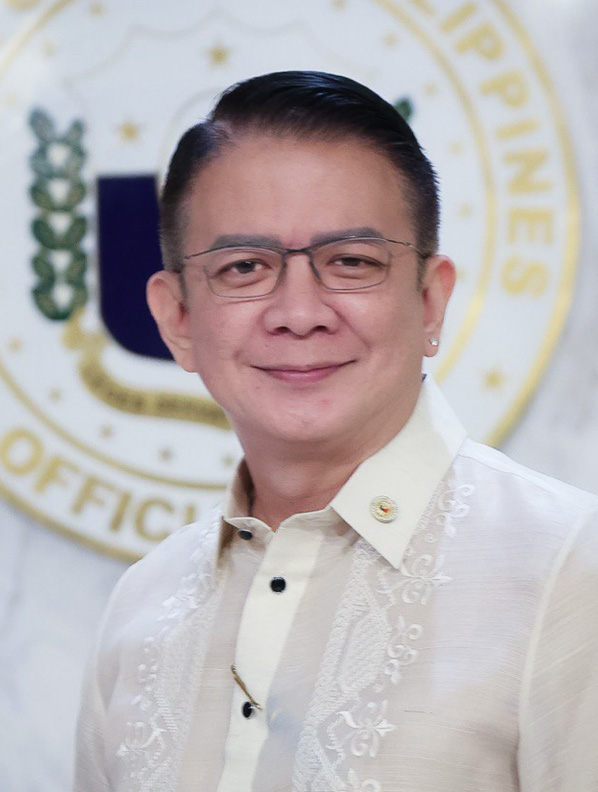
Francis Escudero, presiding officer of the Senate impeachment court

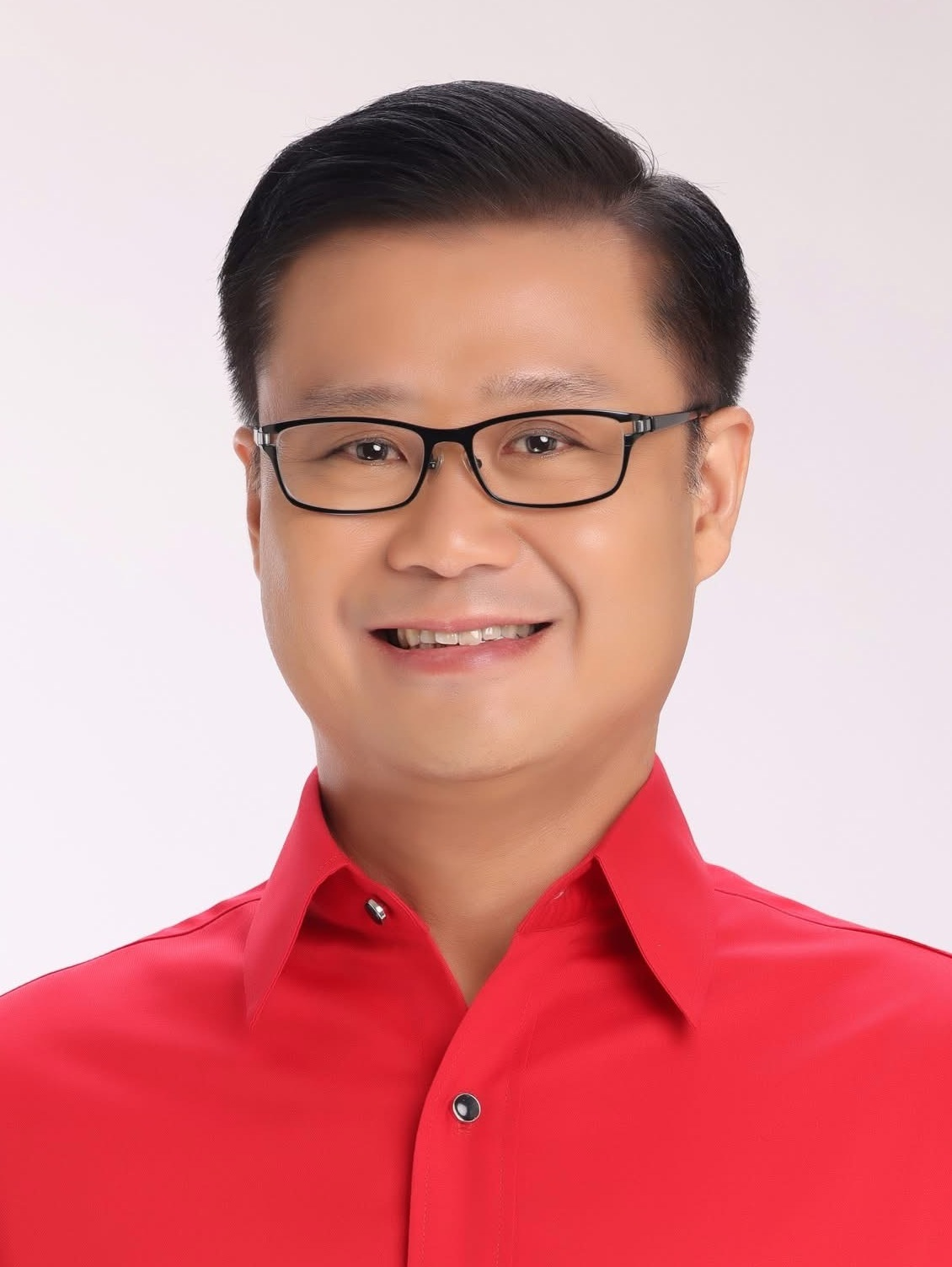
Sherwin Gatchalian, President of the Senate

The amended rules of procedure on impeachment trials provide that the impeachment court may elect a presiding officer other than the Senate president when the impeached official is not the president:

"The President of the Senate shall preside in all other cases of impeachment and unless the Senate, by a majority vote of the members present, elects another Senator as the Presiding Officer. The Presiding Officer shall, for that purpose, be placed under the prescribed oath or affirmation by any person authorized by law to administer an oath."

On the first day of the trial, July 6, 2026, the court elected Senator-Judge Francis Escudero as presiding officer. He was seated to the right of the rostrum beside Senate President Sherwin Gatchalian.

=== Senator-judges ===
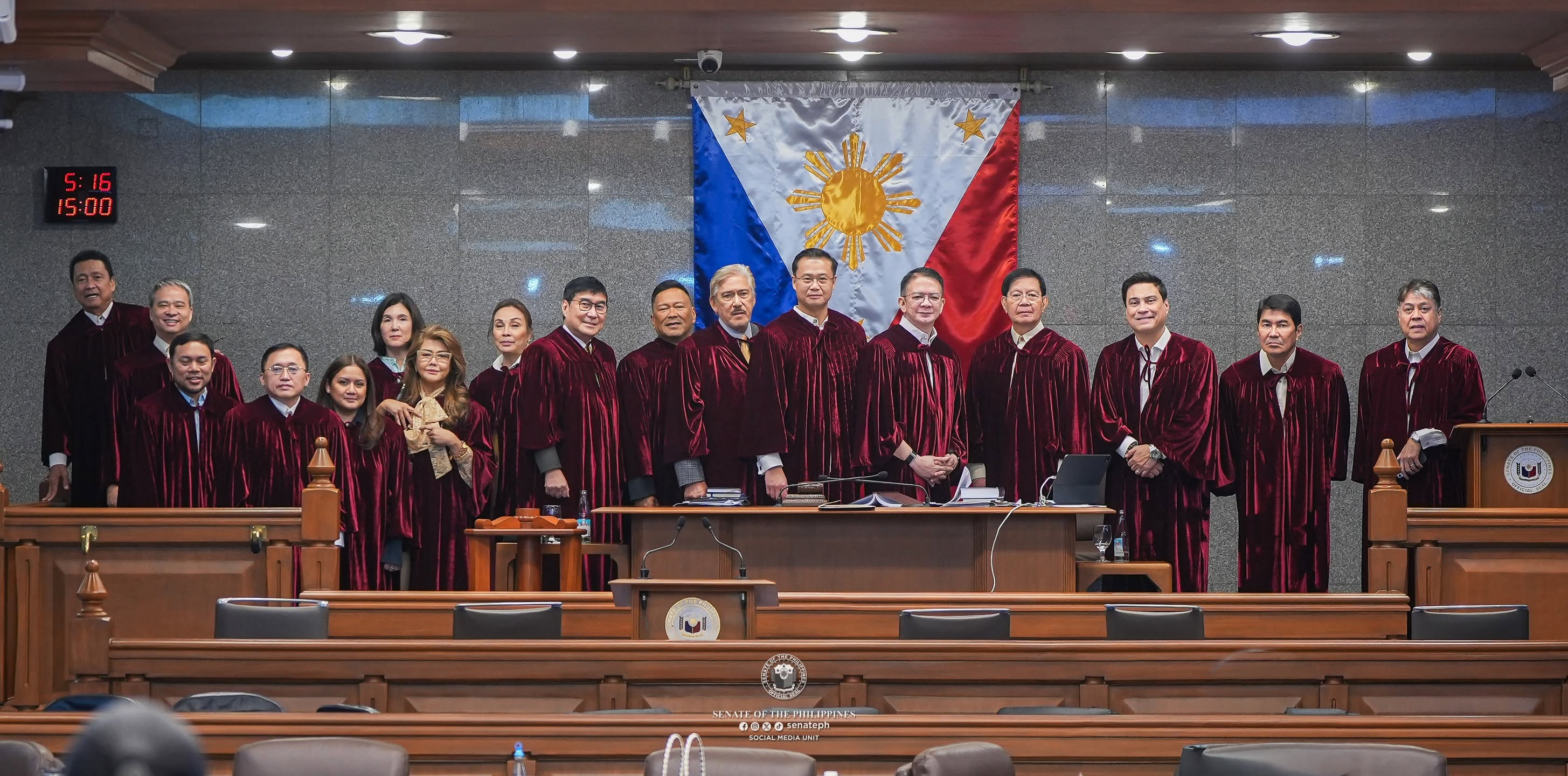
The senator-judges during the opening day of the trial

As in her first impeachment, at least 16 of the 24 sitting senators are required to vote to convict Duterte on any impeachable offense for her to be removed from office as vice president and permanently disqualified from holding public office.

Senator Ronald dela Rosa (PDP), who was absent when the impeachment court convened, was unable to take his oath and is therefore not yet considered a senator-judge. It remains unclear whether he would be allowed to participate in the impeachment trial virtually and take his oath remotely through a notary public. Senator dela Rosa is presently a fugitive due to a warrant of arrest issued by the International Criminal Court.

Following his arrest in relation to the flood control scandal, Senator-Judge Jinggoy Estrada (PMP) was placed under detention at the Quezon City Jail. His continued detention has raised uncertainty regarding his ability to attend the impeachment trial and exercise his vote as a member of the impeachment court.

Senator-Judge Rodante Marcoleta was arrested and committed for detention at the Quezon City Jail in Payatas, Quezon City, on July 6, 2026, on the morning of the first day of the Senate impeachment trial after the Sandiganbayan charged him with plunder. Thus, he was unable to participate in the trial.

Senator-Judge Loren Legarda departed from the Philippines to France on August 2, 2026, amidst preliminary plunder and graft investigations by the Office of the Ombudsman. Senator-Judge Erwin Tulfo said Legarda was on medical leave and secured travel authority, dated August 3 to 5, and confirmed by Legarda's camp. However, as of August 5, there is no confirmation that she has returned to the Philippines.

Senator	Party	Bloc	Status
Bam Aquino	KANP	Majority	Yes
Alan Peter Cayetano	Independent	Minority	Yes
Pia Cayetano	Nacionalista	Minority	Yes
Ronald dela Rosa	PDP	Minority	Did not take oath as senator-judge
JV Ejercito	NPC	Majority	Yes
Francis Escudero	NPC	Majority	Presiding officer
Jinggoy Estrada	PMP	Minority	Arrested
Sherwin Gatchalian	NPC	Majority	Senate President
Bong Go	PDP	Minority	Yes
Risa Hontiveros	Akbayan	Majority	Yes
Panfilo Lacson	Independent	Majority	Yes
Lito Lapid	NPC	Majority	Yes
Loren Legarda	NPC	Minority	Departed the Philippines on August 2, 2026
Rodante Marcoleta	Independent	Minority	Arrested
Imee Marcos	Nacionalista	Minority	Yes
Robin Padilla	PDP	Minority	Yes
Kiko Pangilinan	Liberal	Majority	Yes
Tito Sotto	NPC	Majority	Yes
Erwin Tulfo	Lakas	Majority	Yes
Raffy Tulfo	Independent	Majority	Yes
Joel Villanueva	Independent	Majority	Yes
Camille Villar	Nacionalista	Minority	Yes
Mark Villar	Nacionalista	Majority	Yes
Juan Miguel Zubiri	Independent	Majority	Yes

=== Legal teams ===
==== Prosecution ====
On May 12, 2026, the House of Representatives elected 11 of its members who will serve as prosecutors. They are to defend the lower house's motion to impeach Vice President Duterte before the Senate acting as the impeachment court. All of the prosecutors except Representatives Lordan Suan, Terry Ridon and Kaka Bag-ao were previously elected as prosecutors in the first impeachment of Vice President Duterte, similarly Representative Gerville Luistro has been designated as the lead prosecutor.

Panel of prosecutors from the House

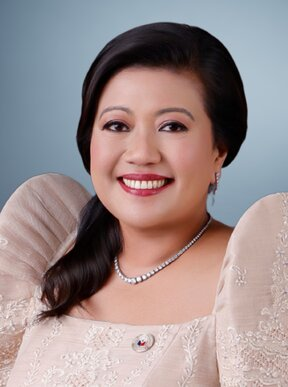
Gerville Luistro
(Lakas, Batangas–2nd)

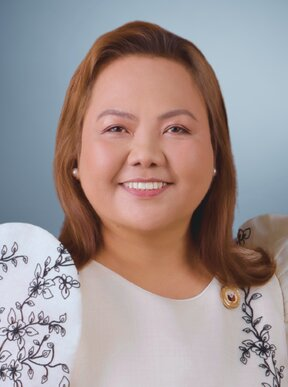
Kaka Bag-ao
(Liberal, Dinagat Islands at-large)

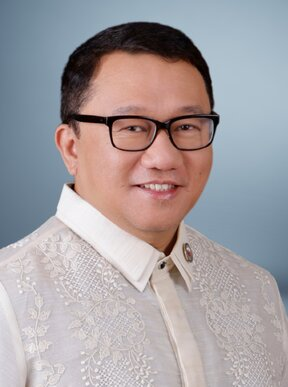
Joel Chua
(NUP, Manila–3rd)

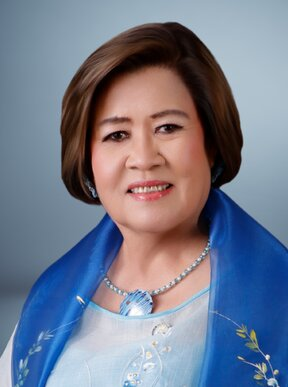
Leila de Lima
(ML, Party-list)

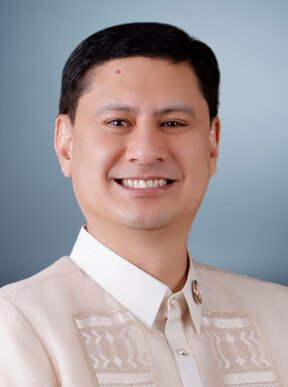
Lorenz Defensor
(NUP, Iloilo–3rd)

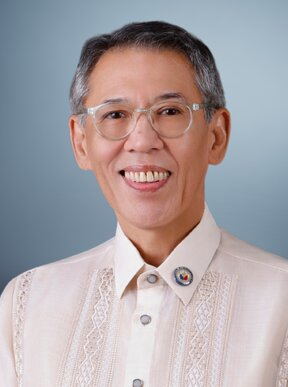
Chel Diokno
(Akbayan, Party-list)

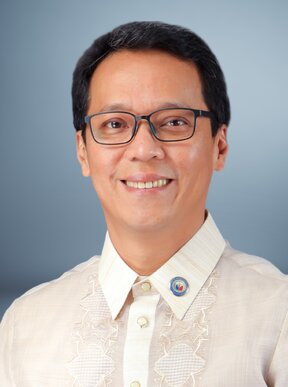
Jonathan Keith Flores
(Lakas, Bukidnon–2nd)

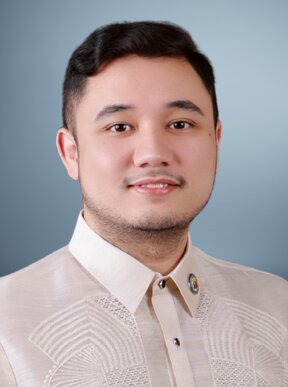
Rodge Gutierrez
(1-Rider, Party-list)

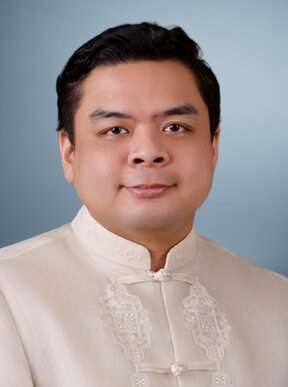
Terry Ridon
(Bicol Saro, Party-list)

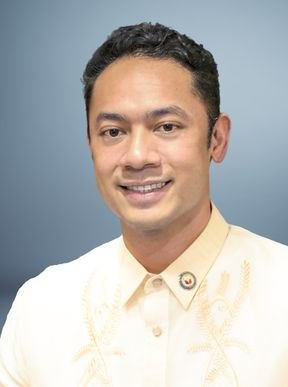
Lordan Suan
(PFP, Cagayan de Oro–1st)

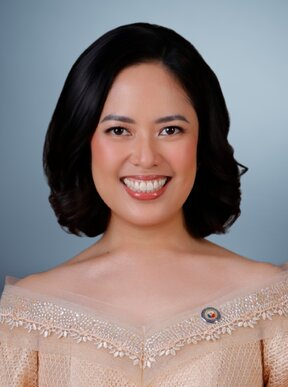
Bel Zamora
(Lakas, San Juan at-large)

Fifteen private lawyers also joined the House prosecution team:

- Marforth Fua, former assistant presidential legal counsel, senior partner and managing partner at PECABAR Law firm
- Erwin Matib, partner at PECABAR Law firm
- Justine Anne Lamarca, partner at PECABAR Law firm
- James Bryan Ibrahim Alih, senior associate at PECABAR Law firm
- Lorna Kapunan, founder of Kapunan and Castillo Law Offices
- Sonya Benemerito-Castillo, co-founder and senior partner at Kapunan and Castillo Law Offices
- Deanna Melissa Lorenzo-Singian, junior partner at Kapunan and Castillo Law Offices
- Lino Chris Kapunan, managing partner at the Kapunan and Castillo Law Offices
- Mae Divinagracia, managing partner at Co Nazario Velasco-Catera and Divinagracia Law Offices
- Amando Virgil Ligutan, managing partner at SALiGAL law firm
- Benjamin Tolosa Jr., founding and managing partner of Tolosa Lim & Chua law firm
- Reynaldo Robles, founding partner of Chan Robles and Associates
- Arnold Labay, senior partner at Chan Robles and Associates
- Bettina Zamora, managing partner at CND Law firm
- Theodore Te, chairperson of the Free Legal Assistance Group, former spokesperson of the Supreme Court

The prosecution also named Representatives Zia Alonto Adiong (Lakas, Lanao del Sur–1st), Renee Co (Kabataan Party-list), private prosecutor Tolosa, and former Representative Ace Barbers, who also serves as an impeachment adviser, as House trial spokespersons.

==== Defense ====
Sixteen lawyers were named by Duterte's camp as members of her defense team, most of whom are from the Fortun, Narvasa & Salazar law firm:

- Sheila Sison (lead counsel), partner at Fortun Narvasa & Salazar law firm
- Michael Wesley Poa (spokesperson), former Department of Education undersecretary, chief of staff, and spokesperson
- Philip Sigfrid Fortun, founding partner of Fortun Narvasa and Salazar law firm
- Gregorio Narvasa II, founding partner of Fortun Narvasa and Salazar law firm
- Kristine Ferrer, partner at Fortun Narvasa & Salazar law firm
- Carlo Joaquin Narvasa, senior associate at Fortun Narvasa & Salazar law firm
- Justin Nicol Gular, senior associate at Fortun Narvasa & Salazar law firm
- David Ronell Golla VII, senior associate at Fortun Narvasa & Salazar law firm
- Lindon Miguel Bacquel, senior associate at Fortun Narvasa & Salazar law firm
- Karol Grace Oroceo, associate at Fortun Narvasa & Salazar law firm
- Clarlaine Radoc, associate at Fortun Narvasa & Salazar law firm
- Francesca Marie Flores, associate at Fortun Narvasa & Salazar law firm
- Miguel Carlos Fernandez, associate at Fortun Narvasa & Salazar law firm
- Mark Vinluan, associate at Fortun Narvasa & Salazar law firm
- Ralph Bodota, managing partner of Bodota & Batungbacal Law Office
- Roberto Batungbacal, partner at Bodota & Batungbacal Law Office

Lawyers Fortun and Narvasa II of the law firm were previously involved in the 2000–2001 impeachment trial of President Joseph Estrada as members of the defense team.

== Trial proper ==
=== July ===
==== July 6 ====
The Senate convened for the first time as the impeachment court on July 6, 2026, after weeks of pre-trial conferences between the prosecution panel of the House of Representatives and the legal team of Vice President Duterte. Senate President Sherwin Gatchalian presided over the opening of the court. Hours before the session, Senator Rodante Marcoleta was arrested on charges of plunder. Duterte did not attend the proceedings. Her spokesperson and member of the defense panel, lawyer Michael Poa, stated that the vice president was attending a planning meeting to prepare her office's response to the possible effects of Super Typhoon Bavi.

The Senate sergeant-at-arms, Alfred Corpus, read aloud the following proclamation to mark the beginning of the proceedings:

All persons are commanded to keep silent, under pain of penalty while the impeachment court is in session for the trial of Vice President Sara Zimmerman Duterte.

Senator-Judge Bam Aquino led the court in prayer. Thereafter, Clerk of Court Renato Bantug Jr. called the roll of members, with 21 senators present at the start of the trial. Senate President Gatchalian delivered an opening statement, stating that the senator-judges must uphold "impartial justice" by basing their verdict on the Constitution, the rule of law, the rules of procedure on impeachment trials, and the evidence presented, without siding with any party. Gatchalian then opened the floor for the election of the presiding officer and recognized Senator-Judge Panfilo Lacson for his nomination.

However, Senator-Judge Alan Peter Cayetano rose on a point of order, arguing that the Senate president was constitutionally required to preside over the proceedings. He cited the deliberations of the 1986 Constitutional Commission regarding the framers' intent with respect to impeachment proceedings. The ensuing debate between members of the majority and minority blocs lasted for approximately one hour, until Gatchalian ruled that the question on Lacson's motion to elect Francis Escudero as presiding officer be put to a division of the house. The motion was approved by a vote of 12–8.

At exactly 14:45 PHT, 12 senator-judges elected Escudero as the presiding officer of the impeachment court, citing the amended Senate rules adopted on June 3, 2026.

Motion to elect Francis Escudero as presiding officer of the impeachment court
Vote	No. of votes	Senator-judges
Yes	12	Aquino; Ejercito; Gatchalian; Hontiveros; Lacson; Lapid; Pangilinan; Sotto; E. Tulfo; R. Tulfo; Villanueva; Zubiri
No	8	A. Cayetano; P. Cayetano; Go; Legarda; Marcos; Padilla; C. Villar; M. Villar
Did not vote	1	Escudero

Escudero, in his opening statement, pledged to discharge his duties "without fear or favor" and emphasized that the impeachment court would conduct the proceedings with impartiality and fidelity to the rule of law. He also ruled that conviction requires the affirmative votes of at least 16 senator-judges, stating that the constitutional requirement of a two-thirds vote applies to all 24 members of the Senate regardless of vacancies, absences, or other circumstances.

The prosecution and defense later delivered their respective opening statements. Representative Gerville Luistro, the lead prosecutor, argued that the trial was a constitutional test of public accountability rather than a political exercise, outlining evidence the prosecution asserted would support the four articles of impeachment and urging the court to decide the case solely on the basis of the Constitution and the evidence presented. The defense, represented by attorney Sheila Sison, countered that the case against Duterte was constitutionally and procedurally flawed, emphasizing the presumption of innocence and the prosecution's burden of proof, and likewise urged the court to decide the case solely on the basis of the Constitution and admissible evidence.

The court also resolved several administrative matters arising from the pre-trial conference, including pending motions filed by both parties regarding the presentation and examination of witnesses, documentary evidence, and the issuance of subpoenas. Senator-Judge Alan Peter Cayetano also requested that the court discuss coordination with the Sandiganbayan to enable Jinggoy Estrada and Rodante Marcoleta to exercise their duties as senator-judges. Presiding Officer Escudero ruled that the matter would be taken up at a later time with members of the court and their offices before determining whether to consult the parties. The impeachment court also resolved that all documents pertaining to the trial would be made publicly accessible through the Senate website in accordance with the constitutional requirement for public disclosure of matters involving public interest.

==== July 7 ====
Duterte's defense lawyer Michael Poa said that Duterte would arrive at the Senate but not appear in the trial, leading the impeachment court to attempt to let Duterte's chief of staff, Zuleika T. Lopez, attend the trial next week. At around 11:40 PHT, a green box allegedly containing Duterte's tax records arrived at the Bureau of Internal Revenue. At 12:00 PHT, Duterte described the trial as a "bloodbath" and said she would be "bloodied but unbowed," referencing lines from William Ernest Henley’s 1888 poem "Invictus". Luistro then announced that NBI agents would give their testimonies in the trial. In his opening statement, Defensor said that accountability applies to all, but Duterte's lawyer said the statement was unfit for trial.

NBI Senior Agent Mark Calilung, presented by private prosecutor Amando Ligutan as the prosecution's first witness, testified regarding the authenticity of several pieces of evidence, including a recording of Duterte's online media conference on November 23, 2024, during which she allegedly stated that she had hired someone to assassinate President Bongbong Marcos, First Lady Liza Araneta Marcos, and former House Speaker Martin Romualdez if she were killed. Ligutan faced repeated objections from defense counsel Carlo Joaquin Narvasa, who argued that several of the prosecutor's questions were either leading or too vague. The trial was adjourned at 18:23 PHT, with the defense's cross-examination of Calilung scheduled for the following day.

==== July 8 ====
The defense cross-examined Calilung, questioning the scope of the NBI's investigation into the alleged threats made by Duterte, his qualifications and professional background, and his knowledge of the documents involved in the investigation. Narvasa questioned Calilung regarding his knowledge of the authenticity of certain affidavits relevant to the bureau's investigation, as well as transcripts of the November 2024 press briefing, including a portion in which Lopez appeared to refer to a threat against her life, which the defense argued provided the context for Duterte's purported threat, although Calilung testified that the remark was serious. Calilung further testified that he did not know the identity of the individual whom Duterte had allegedly contracted to assassinate members of the president's family, and that Duterte and one of her allies, identified only as "Princess Maui," failed to appear before the NBI during its investigation to corroborate claims of threats against Duterte and her family.

Several senator-judges later questioned the witness. Risa Hontiveros asked whether it was the defense's position that alleged grave threats are acceptable if made for a legitimate reason, prompting presiding officer Escudero to remind senator-judges to refrain from framing questions that require either party to reach conclusions of law or fact. Alan Peter Cayetano asked whether the NBI investigated threats against Duterte and why it had not sought confirmation from the Presidential Security Command regarding an active threat against the president. Raffy Tulfo and Panfilo Lacson also asked whether the video of the press conference was AI-generated, which Calilung denied. Escudero also allowed the defense to make a four-minute peroration, following a similar opportunity previously granted to the prosecution in response to Hontiveros's question on July 7 as to whether Duterte's statement constituted an impeachable offense. Both parties declined to conduct redirect and recross examinations of Calilung. NBI Regional Director Jeremy Lotoc, who had been scheduled as the prosecution's next witness, was rescheduled to testify on July 13, followed by Lopez on July 14 and House Sergeant-at-Arms Legislative Security Bureau Executive Director Captain Belinda Bello on July 15.

==== July 13 ====
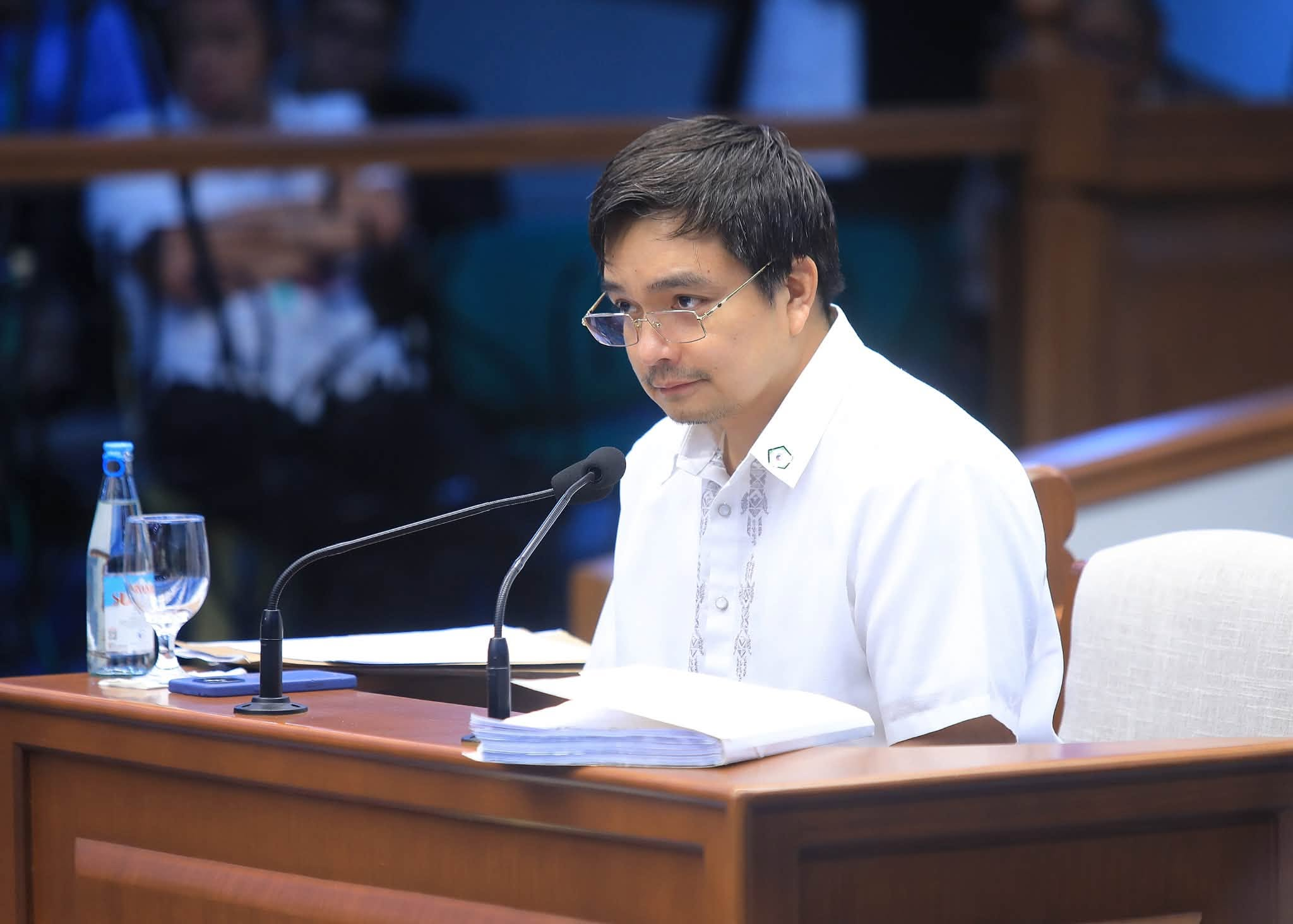
Jeremy Lotoc

Lotoc, becoming the second witness of the prosecution, testified that Duterte seriously posed alleged threats against President Bongbong Marcos, first lady Liza Araneta-Marcos, and former speaker Martin Romualdez, which fall outside the protection of freedom of speech. Lotoc then told the impeachment court that the NBI found sufficient basis in the investigation of Duterte's statements, in which she admitted to have spoken to a supposed assassin before her November 2024 press conference. Senator-judge Bam Aquino questioned the defense that Duterte never hired a hitman, also asking whether that meant her statements during the November 2024 briefing were untrue. Defense counsel Mark Vinluan further added that Duterte didn't contract an assassin.

To argue the deliberate remarks, Lotoc referenced Duterte's October 18, 2024 press conference, which she imagined "cutting his head", and in her November 2024 remarks, where she implied that she didn't recognize anybody above her, and that the country is "in danger of going to hell". Lotoc described Duterte as "furious and fuming mad", stating that she used profanities against the president, the first lady, and the former house speaker roughly eight times. The National Bureau of Investigation (NBI) recommended three counts of grave threats and one count of inciting to sedition against Duterte in a February 10, 2025 affidavit of investigation. Then, Lotoc rejected the argument of Senator Risa Hontiveros that Duterte was just exercising free speech, as he said that excusing those as protected expressions would invite anarchy. He then stated that being "taken advantage of" by other groups made Duterte's words even more dangerous.

Afterwards, the prosecution drew a parallel to the 2020 case of a public school teacher named Ronnel Mas, who was arrested after placing a bounty on former President Rodrigo Duterte. They then argued that Duterte's threats should be treated similarly. The defense announced that it will present witness to prove the existence of Operation Romanov, an alleged plot targeting Duterte and her family. Vinluan confirmed this would be part of their evidence in chief. The Malacañang Palace pushed back against Davao City Mayor Sebastian "Baste" Duterte, who claimed that the impeachment was a plan to block Duterte from the 2028 elections. Palace Press Officer Claire Castro said that if such plan was known in advance, Duterte should have exercised greater caution in handling the confidential funds. Proceedings drew attention after several senator-judges left the session while Lotoc was on the witness stand. The prosecution deferred NBI Director Melvin Matibag's testimony to a day ahead of the original schedule, after the objection of some senator-judges and members of the defense panel, setting Matibag's appearance before the court on July 20.

==== July 14 ====
Lotoc said that investigators factored in Duterte's relationship with the former president, and their pending case from the International Criminal Court (ICC) over alleged extrajudicial killings, evaluating whether she had a capability to execute the alleged threats she made during the November 2024 press conference. Lotoc had no personal knowledge regarding Duterte's contract to someone who will kill the president or other targets. The NBI asserted that the inconsistencies and typographical errors pointed by the defense in the documents did not alter the findings of the crimes that Duterte committed. According to Lotoc and Senator-Judge Erwin Tulfo, the term Operation Romanov was publicly used by Davao City Mayor Baste Duterte in the January 2024 Hakbang ng Maisug rally, which referred to alleged threats against the Marcos family.

Additionally, private prosecutor Lorna Kapunan said that both Zuleika Lopez and Belinda Bello would not be presented in the prosecution, arguing that their testimonies would be unnecessary, redundant, and surplusage regarding Duterte's alleged grave threats, following the testimonies of both Calilung and Lotoc. This movement came amid mounting pressure for the court to speed things along. Senate President Sherwin Gatchalian warned that if the current pace of proceedings (of one witness per two days) could go on, it would mean that the trial could last over a year. He also mentioned that there were 102 listed witnesses, and the trial would be dealt with for 17 months if the current pace continued.

==== July 15 ====
No witnesses took over the witness stand. Instead, both sides were given 15 minutes of arguments and 10 minutes of rebuttal. Presiding Officer Francis Escudero mentioned that senator-judges agreed in caucus to decide on the matters that are going to be discussed on Monday, July 20.

The prosecution argued that Duterte's financial activity surged in 2007, submitting an Anti-Money Laundering Council (AMLC) report to the House committee on justice. House prosecutor Representative Chel Diokno mentioned that transactions reached ₱28.15 million during 2007, with financial movements increasing to ₱400 million between 2009 and 2013, which also peaked to ₱704.93 million in 2009. Diokno then pointed out the impeachment of then-chief justice Renato Corona as precedent, implying that the Senate subpoenaed and admitted tax records of Corona as evidence. Prosecution spokesman Benjamin Tolosa Jr. said that the early obtainment of documents during the proceedings would help avoid delays for Article II to be eventually tackled.

The defense panel pushed back, as defense counsel Michael Poa warned that the subpoena request had risks becoming a fishing expedition. However, San Juan representative Ysabel Maria Zamora countered that the panel has enough evidence in order to support the unexplained wealth allegations, despite if the subpoena was denied. Impeachment court spokesperson Reginald Tongol clarified that a majority of the senate-judges present on July 20 is sufficient to grant or deny the request. Tongol further said that treating the subpoena as a preview of the senator-judges' conviction vote is unfair, and that the only issue before them is a citizen's right in private matters. Afterwards, six witnesses were withdrawn for Article IV, as House prosecutor representative Lorenz Defensor said that the panel's case has been established, and having additional witnesses would become counterproductive. This left Melvin Matibag, who was confirmed the only remaining witness for Article IV, scheduled to testify on Tuesday, July 21.

The prosecution then announced its first four witnesses for Article I: House legislative archives chief Marivic Pareja, Landbank of the Philippines president and CEO Lynette Ortiz, and two former branch managers, Violeta Constantino and Nenita Camposano. Proceedings were then disrupted after senator Pia Cayetano accused Matibag of trying to intimidate senator-judges by raising a planned investigation into alleged funding irregularities regarding the 2019 Southeast Asian Games complex, which is linked to her brother, senator Alan Peter Cayetano. Matibag claimed that the probe is incidental and has nothing to do with Cayetano. The impeachment court then ordered both parties to refrain from explaining reasons for withdrawing witnesses, as the defense said that the prosecution's explanations contained conclusions that only the court can determine.

=== November ===
On November 5, prior to the resumption of the trial, the defense team publicized their list of 25 witnesses for the trial, having filed two manifestations the day before to ask the impeachment court to subpoena these witnesses. However, hours prior to the list's release, one of the witnesses, law professor Ralph Sarmiento, declined to participate out of his desire "to preserve the independence of my constitutional law scholarship and the impartiality of my legal views and opinions." By November 12, four witnesses from the list managed to testify before the defense decided to drop 16 other witnesses of the banking industry from its list.

Defense team's list of witnesses
Name of witness	Notes
Ralph A. Sarmiento	Constitutional law scholar; declined to testify
Suzette Balucanag-Punay	Counsel for Metro City Chow Foods Corporation
Jaime G. Adalin	Davao City assessor
John Kenneth Enumerables	Island Garden City of Samal assessor
Vingelin Bajan	Davao City accountant
Cindy Q. Colina	Matina Crossing barangay captain; withdrawn on November 10
Olivia Barcarse	BDO Unibank official; withdrawn on November 11
Alvin C. Go	BDO Unibank official; withdrawn on November 11
Paul Roderick A. Ysmael	BPI official; former UP Student Council chairman; withdrawn on November 12
Cesar Bernard R. Coloma	BPI official; withdrawn on November 11
Marino M. Buban Jr.	EastWest Bank official; withdrawn on November 11
Joselito B. Vallada	Landbank of the Philippines official; withdrawn on November 11
Janella Marie R. Panlilio	Metrobank official; withdrawn on November 11
Jose M. Manuel Jr.	PSBank official; withdrawn on November 11
Rodel C. Mediavillo	PSBank official; withdrawn on November 11
May Ann R. Candaroma-Morales	PSBank official; withdrawn on November 11
Joseph Anthony P. Lopez	Security Bank official; withdrawn on November 11
Joselito V. Banaag	UnionBank official; withdrawn on November 11
Louiemel P. Panes	UnionBank Davao official; withdrawn on November 11
Rogelio C. Villos Jr.	UnionBank Davao official; withdrawn on November 11
Jayah Deneserie B. Scalf	UnionBank Mandaluyong official; withdrawn on November 11
Gemma Lynn L. Del Mundo	UnionBank Mandaluyong official; withdrawn on November 11
Anel Martin S. Antero	
Chadrin S. Parian	
Vimar M. Barcellano	City prosecutor of Quezon City
