= Killing of Gisela Boniel =

2017 killing in the Philippines

Death of Gisela Boniel
- Date: June 7, 2017
- Location: Waters off Cebu
- Type: Suspected kidnapping and killing
- Outcome: Gisela Boniel presumed dead. Body of Boniel has yet to be retrieved.
- Deaths: Gisela Boniel (presumed)
- Suspects: Niño Rey Boniel
- Charges: Parricide [sic], kidnapping, serious illegal detention

On June 7, 2017, Gisela Bendong-Boniel, the incumbent mayor of Bien Unido, Bohol, Philippines, was killed by her husband, Niño Rey Boniel, a member of the Bohol Provincial Board. As of 2025, her body remains missing.

Niño Rey Boniel was charged with parricide, kidnapping, serious illegal detention, and physical injuries for his role in the killing. On February 8, 2022, he pleaded guilty to a lesser charge of homicide through a plea bargaining agreement and was sentenced to 8–14 years in prison. He is still facing separate cases of serious illegal detention and kidnapping.

== Background ==
=== Victim and suspect ===
Gisela Boniel
- Born: Gisela Zambrano Bendong; May 21, 1977; Iligan City, Philippines
- Died: June 7, 2017 (aged 40); Olango Island Group, Lapu-Lapu, Philippines
- Cause of death: Gunshot wound to the head
- Spouse: Niño Rey Boniel (m. 2012)
- Children: 1

Gisela Zambrano Bendong was born on May 21, 1977, in Iligan City, Philippines to a family of pilots. From a young age, she dreamed of becoming a pilot. She was the first female commercial pilot of Philippines AirAsia and during her early years, had faced discrimination from fellow male pilots due to her gender.

Niño Rey Feniza Boniel was born on December 19, 1979, in Bien Unido, Bohol, to Cosme Boniel, a former mayor of the municipality, and Marina Feniza-Boniel, a businesswoman. In 2007, at the age of 29, he was elected mayor of Bien Unido, becoming the second youngest executive in the municipality's history. As mayor, he established a dive camp aimed at attracting visitors to the Bien Unido Double Barrier Reef. Upon discovering illegal fishing activities in the area, he also commissioned the creation of an underwater grotto near the reef, featuring 14-foot tall statues of the Virgin Mary and Santo Niño de Cebú.

Niño met Gisela at a conference in Tagbilaran, where she subsequently traveled to Bien Unido. They married in civil rites in 2012 after Gisela discovered she was two months pregnant. Their first child, a son, was born in July of that year.

In the 2016 elections, Niño, having reached his term limit after serving three consecutive terms as mayor, campaigned for a seat on the Bohol Provincial Board representing the 2nd district, while Gisela ran to succeed him as mayor. Both emerged victorious in their elections. However, Gisela encountered attacks from her husband's political opponents and became entangled in controversies linked to him.

Financial problems allegedly affected their marriage after Gisela bought a watch worth P2.5 million, which is said to have angered Niño.

== Death of Gisela ==
On the afternoon of June 6, 2017, Mayor Boniel, accompanied by her best friend Angela Celeste Gamalinda-Leyson and her then 17-year-old son, arrived in Tagbilaran from Cebu City. Leyson joined the mayor at the office of the city prosecutor of Tagbilaran for a cyberlibel hearing that the mayor had initiated. Following the hearing, they proceeded to the Commission on Audit to inquire about Bien Unido's deficit.

Leyson testified that the group had no plans to stay overnight in Bohol, as they had other appointments scheduled in Cebu later that night. However, Boniel was persuaded by tourism officer Wilson Hoylar and her executive secretary Brian Sayson to return to Bien Unido because there were important documents that needed to be signed. Her intention was to sign these documents to initiate an annulment case and simultaneously resign as mayor.

At around 8:00 PM, before reaching Bien Unido, Sayson informed the mayor that the individuals who had the documents were no longer at the municipal hall. Consequently, they proceeded to the Dive Camp Resort, owned by the municipality, with the understanding that the documents would be delivered there the following morning. At the resort, Leyson shared a room with the mayor, while her son and Sayson occupied the next room.

The following day, June 7, 2017, around 2:00 AM, six to eight men entered Leyson and Boniel's room. They duct-taped Leyson's face and tasered her around the lower portion of her ears. Leyson overheard the mayor speaking to her husband, recognized by his nickname "In-In". She pleaded for him to spare her friend and informed him that Leyson's son was in the adjacent room, with a gun pointed at her forehead. Leyson then lost consciousness, unaware that the mayor had already been taken from the room.

A few hours later, Hoylar and Randel Lupas, a driver of the municipality who had driven the group from Tagbilaran, woke Leyson and her 17-year-old son. They instructed them to stand up as they were taken to Tubigon and forced to board a high-speed craft bound for Cebu. Boniel's name was listed on the boat's manifesto to falsely indicate that the mayor had also boarded the fast craft to Cebu.

Meanwhile, Gisela's body was wrapped in a blanket and transported to a pump boat piloted by Riolito Boniel, a cousin of Niño Rey. Lupas testified that he and Hoylar carried Gisela's body to the pump boat. Riolito recalled witnessing Niño Rey aim a pistol at Gisela's head around 4:00 AM and allegedly shoot her. They then secured her body with a fishnet, attached a 30-kilogram rock to weigh it down, and disposed of her body into the sea somewhere between the Olango Island Group and Bohol.

During the interrogation, Niño Rey said it was Riolito who shot his wife, but Riolito and driver Randel Lupas alleged that it was Niño Rey who shot her.

=== Retrieval of Boniel's body ===
Search and retrieval operations started on June 9. Divers scoured the waters near Caubian island at 200 ft (61 m) but they couldn't find Boniel's body. The deadline was intended to be 15 days. After days of searching, the retrieval operation ended but mayor Boniel's family appealed to the authorities that they could resume. On July 15, 2017, the search and retrieval operation ended permanently as they could not find her body.

On July 1, 2017, A woman's body was found in the waters of Tabuelan and was brought to Escalante, Negros Occidental. There was a speculation that this could be mayor Boniel's body. The body was later ruled out to be that of Boniel and was identified as the body of a 64 year old woman who is a resident from Calatrava, Negros Occidental.

=== Memorial ===
Although her body was not found, her family held a memorial service on the sea on July 1, 2017, in Caubian Island. In November 2017, her family celebrated All Souls Day on the sea.

== Trial ==
Niño Rey pleaded not guilty for kidnapping, serious illegal detention and physical injuries. On January 11, 2018, Niño was brought to Cebu jail. Due to his poor health condition, he was treated in Cebu Provincial Detention and Rehabilitation Center.

On March 22, 2018, Justice Secretary Vitaliano Aguirre II reversed the mariticide order, but on March 28, after facing backlash, Aguirre revived the mariticide order.

On May 28, Niño Rey's pre-trial for kidnapping and serious illegal detention was reset to September 5.

On June 14, 2018, Niño Rey Boniel resigned his post as Bohol Board Member, and his trial was set for September 7. On September 7, Niño Rey did not attend his trial due to his health concerns. The Bendong family, through their lawyer Amando Virgil Ligutan, released a statement alleging that Niño Rey's reason to be intentionally absent was because of his unpreparedness to attend the hearing.

On September 12, 2019, two murder suspects involved in the crime are arrested after they were found hiding in Lapu-Lapu City.

On February 8, 2022, Boniel pleaded guilty to homicide after admitting into killing Gisela and was sentenced to 8–14 years in prison. He is currently facing separate cases of serious illegal detention and kidnapping.

== In popular culture ==
The case was featured on GMA Network's investigative docudrama program Imbestigador in an episode entitled "Mayora". Gisela Boniel was portrayed by Rhian Ramos, while her best friend Angela Leyson portrayed by Coleen Perez, and Niño Rey Boniel portrayed by Geoff Eigenmann.
