= Alfred Corpus =

Sergeant-at-Arms of the Senate of the Philippines since 2026

Retired PMGEN Alfred Corpus
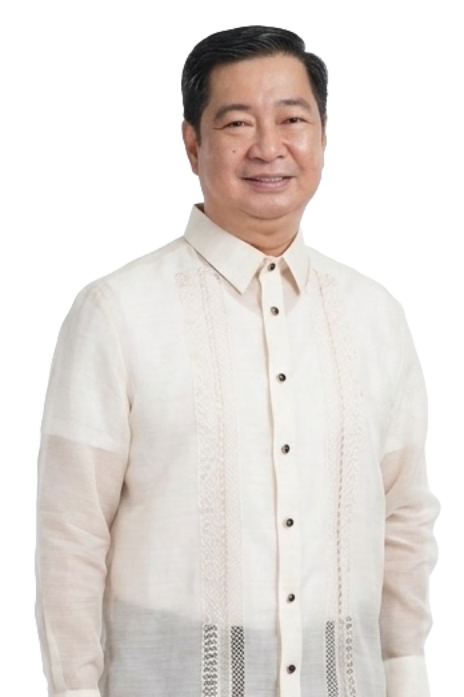
- Official portrait, 2026

Sergeant-at-Arms of the Senate of the Philippines
- Incumbent
- Assumed office June 3, 2026
- Preceded by: Manuel Parlade (OIC)

Personal details
- Born: Parang, Maguindanao, Philippines
- Education: Philippine Military Academy (BS); Philippine Christian University (MA)
- Police career
- Country: Philippine National Police
- Division: PNP Special Action Force; PNP Directorate for Operations; Police Regional Office 12; PNP Training Service; Eastern Police District; Cavite Police Provincial Office; Tarlac Police Provincial Office; PNP Taguig City Police Station
- Rank: Major General

Alfred Sotto Corpus is a Filipino former police officer who has served as the Sergeant-at-Arms of the Senate of the Philippines since June 3, 2026.

== Early life and education ==
Corpus was born in Parang, Maguindanao. He graduated from the Philippine Military Academy in 1987, earning a Bachelor of Science degree. He later obtained a Master of Arts in Management from Philippine Christian University in 2006 and completed executive programs at the Harvard Kennedy School and the Institute for Corporate Directors in 2018.

== Career ==
Corpus began his career by serving as a security officer to former interior secretary Rafael Alunan III and former Armed Forces chief of staff Renato de Villa. He also served in the Special Action Force of the Philippine National Police (PNP) and later held several positions in the PNP, including director for operations, regional director of the former Police Regional Office 12, director of the PNP Training Service, director of the Eastern Police District, director of the Cavite and Tarlac Provincial Police Offices, and chief of police of Taguig City. He was appointed executive director of the Philippine Center for Transnational Crime in 2021.

=== Sergeant-at-Arms of the Senate (2026–present) ===
Corpus was elected sergeant-at-arms of the Senate of the Philippines on June 3, 2026, during the session attended by minority senators and Francis Escudero, which declared all elective positions vacant and saw Sherwin Gatchalian's election as president pro tempore. He succeeded OIC sergeant-at-arms Manuel Parlade, who had been designated to replace suspended sergeant-at-arms Mao Aplasca. During the second impeachment trial of Vice President Sara Duterte, Corpus read the proclamation commanding order and silence during the proceedings and warning of penalties for violations of the impeachment court's rules.

== Awards and decorations ==
- Gold Cross (Medalyang Gintong Krus)
- Bronze Cross (Medalyang Tanso na Krus)
- Medalya ng Katangitanging Gawa (PNP Outstanding Achievement Medal) (PNP Special Service Medal)
- Medalya ng Pambihirang Paglilingkod (PNP Special Service Medal)
- Medalya ng Kadakilaan (PNP Heroism Medal)
