= Metro City Chow Foods Corporation =

Metro City Chow Foods Corporation, or simply Metro City Chow, is a Philippine company based in Davao City. Established in 2016, it is a successor to the City Hall King Chow Foods Corporation established in 2007. The company is a licensee of fast food franchises in the Philippines. Vice President Sara Duterte has been a board member of the company since its founding, owning 20% of the company's shares.

== History ==
=== Predecessor: City Hall King Chow ===
City Hall King Chow Foods Corporation was first registered with the Securities and Exchange Commission (SEC) on March 9, 2007. Its stated primary purpose was for "establishing, operating, and maintaining restaurants, coffee shops, refreshment parlors, cocktail lounges, and food catering." Businessman Jaime T. Cruz and Davao City politician Sara Duterte are listed as two of City Hall King Chow's incorporators, with Duterte being a board member from 2007 to 2019, owning 20 percent of company shares during her tenure as Davao City mayor. Based on the amended General Information Sheet (GIS) of the firm for 2019 to 2021, Duterte was no longer a stockholder or director at City Hall King Chow since 2019. No dividends were declared by the corporation since its establishment.

=== Metro City Chow ===
Metro City Chow Foods Corporation was first registered with the SEC on August 4, 2016. Its initial authorized capital stock was at ₱1,000,000. Jaime T. Cruz and Davao City Mayor Sara Duterte are listed as incorporators of the company, with Duterte owning 20% of shares and being a member of the board of directors and the compensation committee from 2016 up to 2025. In her statement of assets, liabilities and net worth, Duterte listed Metro City Chow and City Hall King Chow together with a slash in between; at the SEC, however, they are registered as two different companies. Metro City Chow's total revenue from 2017 to 2025 amounted to ₱309.01 million, with a net loss of ₱3.15 million; no dividends were declared by the corporation since its establishment. Duterte's continuing role as a board director of Metro City Chow during her vice presidency has been questioned for its illegality during her 2026 impeachment trial, as politicians who hold high positions in government are constitutionally prohibited from being engaged in any business.
