= Amando Virgil Ligutan =

Filipino lawyer and academic

Amando Virgil D. Ligutan
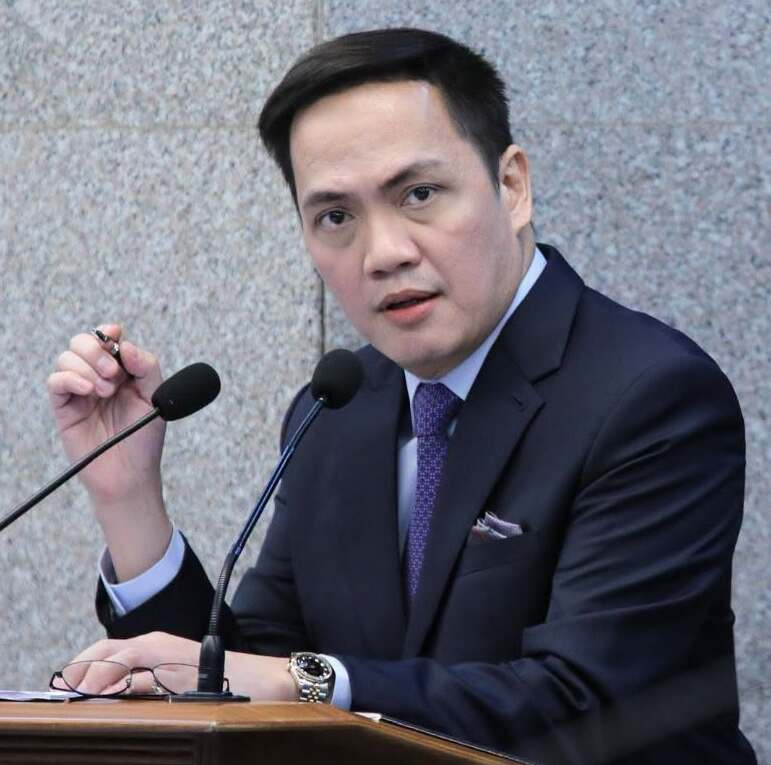
- Ligutan in 2026
- Born: Carigara, Leyte, Philippines
- Education: University of San Carlos (AB Philosophy); University of the Philippines College of Law (JD)
- Occupations: Lawyer, academic
- Known for: Private prosecutor in the 2026 impeachment trial of Vice President Sara Duterte

Amando Virgil Descartin Ligutan, commonly known as Virgil Ligutan, is a Filipino lawyer based in Cebu City, Philippines. He is the managing partner of the law firm Sapayan Lim Alvarez & Ligutan (SALiGAL) Law and a senior lecturer at the University of the Philippines College of Law. He became a nationally recognized figure in July 2026 when he served as one of the private prosecutors assisting the House of Representatives prosecution panel in the Senate impeachment trial of Vice President Sara Duterte.

== Early life and education ==
Ligutan was born in Carigara, Leyte to parents who were both public servants. His mother was a district nurse, while his father worked for the Department of Agrarian Reform. He was the class valedictorian at Sacred Heart School Seminary in Palo, Leyte. He completed his undergraduate studies in Cebu City, graduating summa cum laude with a degree in Philosophy from the University of San Carlos. He achieved an overall grade point average of 1.02. He then attended the University of the Philippines College of Law, where he earned his Juris Doctor degree. He passed the Philippine bar examinations in 2009.

== Legal career ==
After completing his law degree, Ligutan worked as a junior associate at the Angara Abello Concepcion Regala & Cruz (ACCRA) Law Offices. In 2010, he joined the Cebu-based firm Sapayan Lim Alvarez & Ligutan (SALiGAL) Law, where he now serves as managing partner.

According to the firm's description of his practice, Ligutan has litigated numerous high-profile civil, criminal, and public interest cases that have drawn national attention, with particular focus on political and local government law; he has also served as a consultant to local chief executives and lawmakers in cases involving local government officials.

Ligutan's advocacy work has included involvement in several publicly notable cases in the Visayas region. In 2017, he took part in the prosecution of Niño Rey Boniel, the former mayor of Bien Unido, Bohol, who was convicted in connection with the killing of his wife, Gisela Bendong-Boniel, and was sentenced by the Lapu-Lapu Regional Trial Court. He has also represented Cebuano artist and free-speech advocate Maria Victoria "Bambi" Beltran, who was arrested multiple times between 2020 and 2023 in connection with social media posts and a cyber-libel complaint.

Ligutan has publicly commented on several national issues, including criticizing the 2020 non-renewal of the ABS-CBN broadcast franchise, speaking out against extrajudicial killings associated with the government's anti-illegal drugs campaign, and calling for a formal lawyers' protection program following the killings of two lawyers in late 2020. He has also expressed support for international accountability mechanisms, including the jurisdiction of the International Criminal Court over alleged crimes connected to the Philippine drug war.

== Academic career ==
Ligutan has taught law since 2011, serving as a senior lecturer at the University of the Philippines College of Law and also lecturing at the University of San Jose-Recoletos School of Law and the University of Cebu School of Law, with teaching areas including Labor Law, Remedial Law, and Public International Law. In mid-2026, he announced he would step away from teaching for one semester, his first time not teaching a law subject since 2011, to focus on the Duterte impeachment trial.

== 2026 impeachment trial of Vice President Sara Duterte ==
In June 2026, the House of Representatives named its first batch of private prosecutors to assist its prosecution panel, led by Batangas Representative Gerville Luistro, in the impeachment trial of Vice President Sara Duterte before the Senate. Ligutan was among the pro bono lawyers deputized for the role, having previously served as counsel for one of the complainants in the impeachment case.

Ligutan said his decision to join the prosecution team was prompted by the case of a public elementary school principal in Virac, Catanduanes, who had been sentenced to eleven years in prison over an alleged misappropriation of five thousand pesos. He argued that if such a comparatively small sum could result in a lengthy prison term, allegations against a sitting vice president involving millions of pesos in public funds warranted equally serious scrutiny.

The impeachment trial opened on July 6, 2026, with the first eleven trial dates allotted to Article IV of the articles of impeachment, which accuses Duterte of making grave threats against President Bongbong Marcos, First Lady Liza Araneta-Marcos, and former House Speaker Martin Romualdez, stemming from remarks she made during a livestreamed press briefing in November 2024. On the second day of the trial, July 7, 2026, Ligutan conducted the direct examination of the prosecution's first witness, National Bureau of Investigation (NBI) Cybercrime Division Senior Agent John Mark Calilung, presenting video evidence and digital forensic testimony related to the alleged threats. His courtroom conduct during this period, including his handling of objections and cross-examination exchanges with defense counsel Carlo Joaquin Narvasa, drew wide attention in the Philippine press, with commentators describing his style as calm and methodical.

On the trial's third day, July 8, 2026, the defense cross-examined Calilung, and the exchange featured repeated objections from both sides. Presiding officer Senator Francis Escudero remarked that Ligutan appeared frustrated during the proceedings, a characterization that prosecution panel members downplayed as a normal feature of courtroom litigation. Ligutan later stated that the prosecution saw no need for a redirect examination of Calilung, asserting the defense had failed to rebut the material points of the witness's testimony; defense counsel objected to this characterization, and the matter was left for the presiding officer to verify against the official trial record. During the same week, Ligutan confirmed to the impeachment court that the prosecution intended to present an additional witness regarding an alleged "hitman" referenced in Duterte's November 2024 remarks, without disclosing the witness's identity.
