= Mace of the Senate of the Philippines =

Ceremonial mace of the upper house of the Philippines Congress

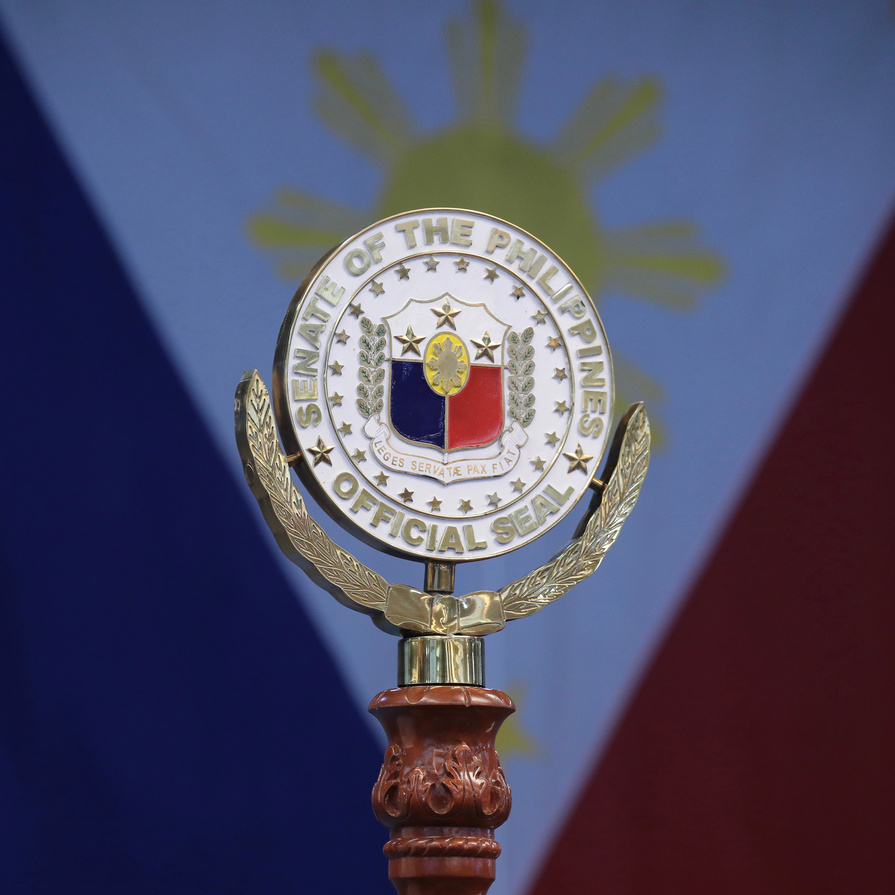
The current mace of the Senate of the Philippines

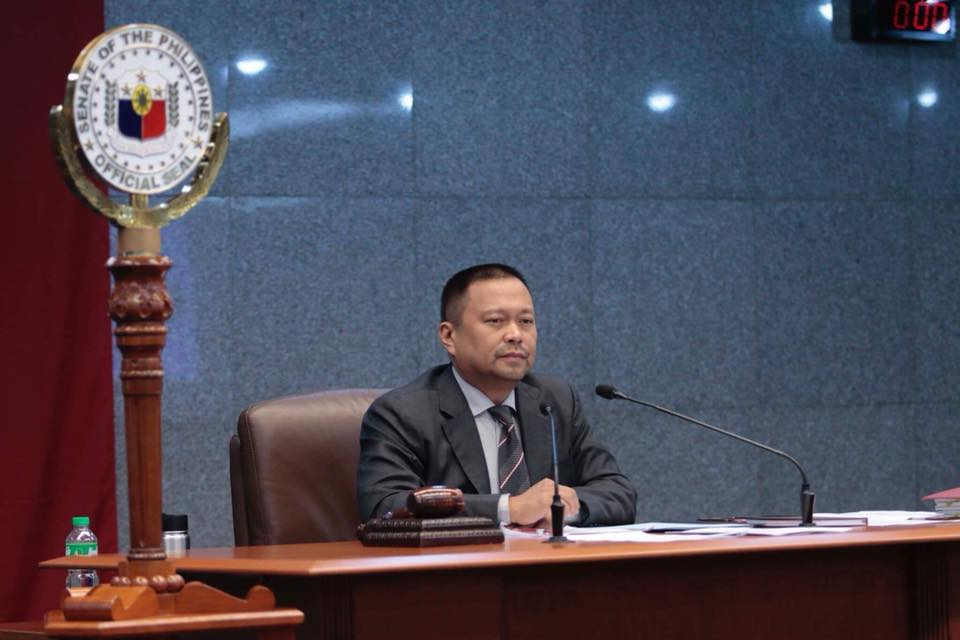
Senator JV Ejercito presiding over a session of the Senate. To his right is the mace of the Senate.

The mace of the Senate of the Philippines is a ceremonial mace used as the symbol of authority in the Senate of the Philippines.

== Description ==
It represents the authority of the president of the Senate and also the authority of the sergeant-at-arms when enforcing order in the institution. It is considered a significant part of the Senate's regalia and is a symbol of the institution being properly constituted. When the Senate is in session, it is displayed at the Senate president's rostrum. If the Senate is not in session, it is kept under the custody of the sergeant-at-arms.

Rule VI, Section 8 of the rules of the Senate provides that the sergeant-at-arms is the designated custodian of the mace. At certain occasions, such as disorder in the session hall, the official shall lift the mace from its pedestal and present it before an unruly member to restore order or quell boisterous behavior in the chamber.

During the Commonwealth period, the mace of the Senate bore the coat of arms of the Philippine Commonwealth. From the 1st to the 7th Congress, this was replaced by the coat of arms of the Philippines with a scroll below bearing the Latin maxim Leges servatae pax fiat ("Law Serves Peace, Let It Be Done"), mounted atop a wooden staff, similar to that previously used by the House of Representatives.

The current design of the mace, in use since the 8th Congress, consists of a wooden staff with the Senate's seal on the top.

== Role in changes in the Senate presidency ==
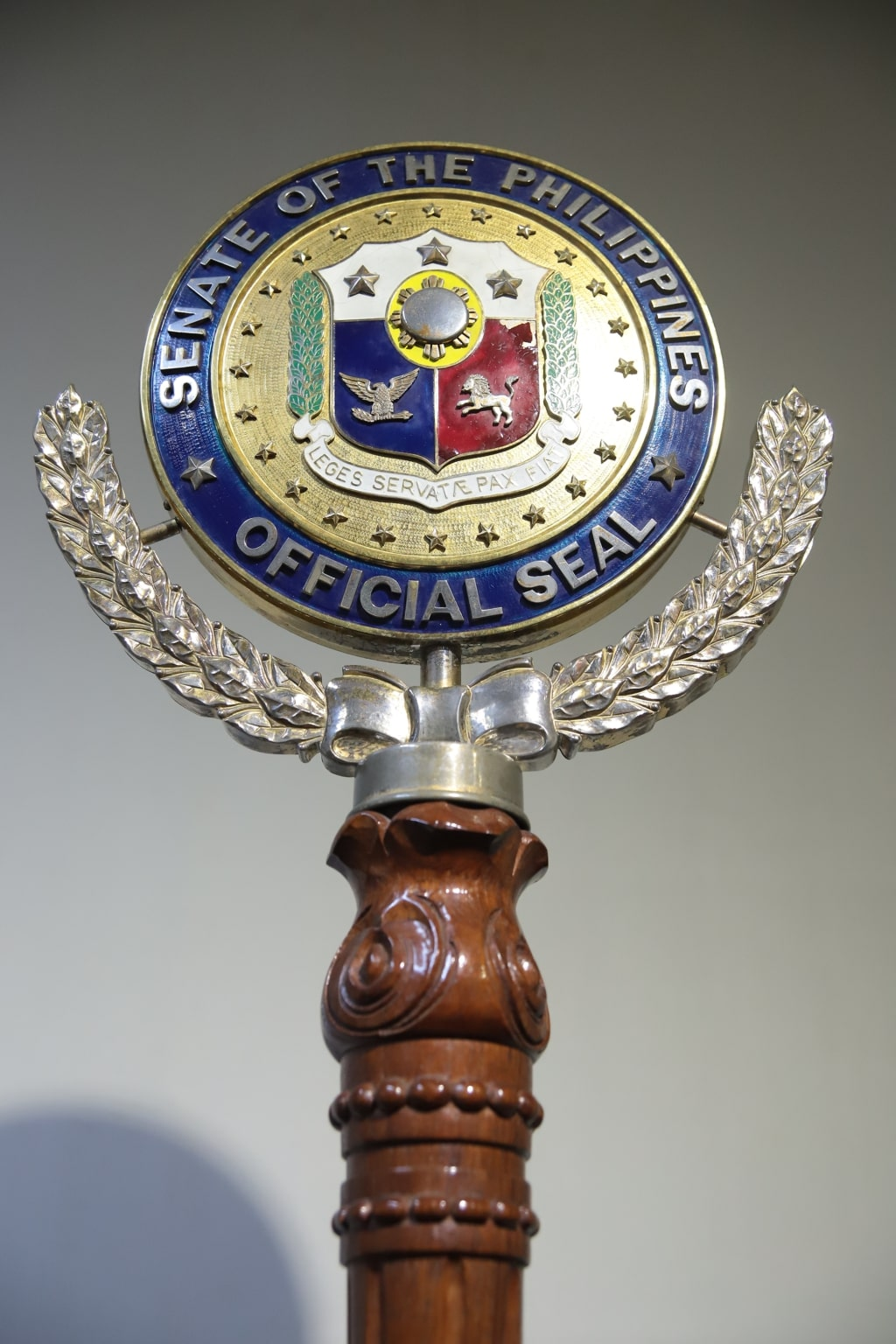
The mace previously used by the Philippine Senate from 1987 to around 2008

On December 12, 1991, a rump session of thirteen senators ousted incumbent Senate president Jovito Salonga in favor of Neptali Gonzales. Aides of both Salonga and Gonzales attempted to seize possession of the mace, as both camps asserted the authority of their respective Senate presidencies, with Salonga questioning the legality of Gonzales’s election. Several personnel from the Office of the Sergeant-at-Arms took custody of the mace beside the president’s rostrum and left the session hall. Senator Ernesto Maceda, who was reported to have temporarily presided over the session, attempted to legally convene with the mace as a symbol of a duly constituted session by improvising with the mace of the 1986 Constitutional Commission, tying a framed replica of the Senate seal above the staff. The dispute was eventually settled in January of the following year after the regular session resumed, with Salonga relinquishing the Senate presidency to Gonzales.

== See also ==
- Mace of the House of Representatives of the Philippines
