= Benjamin Tolosa Jr. =

Filipino lawyer

Benjamin S. Tolosa Jr.
- Tolosa conducting a direct examination during the impeachment trial of Vice-President Sara Duterte
- Other name: Jay Tolosa
- Education: University of Santo Tomas (Legal Management, JD)
- Occupation: Lawyer
- Known for: Legal spokesperson in the 2026 impeachment trial of Vice President Sara Duterte

Benjamin S. Tolosa Jr., commonly known as Jay Tolosa, is a Filipino lawyer. He is known for handling high-profile disputes, including defending American soldier Joseph Pemberton and representing TV5. In 2026, he became legal spokesperson for the House of Representatives’ private prosecution team in the Senate impeachment trial of Vice-President of the Philippines Sara Duterte.

== Early life and education ==
Tolosa earned an undergraduate degree in legal management from the University of Santo Tomas in 2003 and completed his law degree at the same institution in 2008, where he ranked seventh among the 145 graduates. He passed the Philippine Bar Examinations in 2009.

== Legal career ==
Early in his career, Tolosa spent more than four years as a senior associate in the litigation and dispute resolution department of Angara Abello Concepcion Regala & Cruz (ACCRA) Law. He subsequently served as counsel for PMFTC, a local affiliate of Philip Morris International, and later as general counsel and assistant vice president of Primer Group of Companies, a conglomerate engaged in the retail and distribution of premium global brands. In government, he was a legal consultant for the Bureau of Immigration.

In 2019, Tolosa co-founded his own firm, which he has described as Tolosa Javier (TJ) Law, where he serves as managing partner and head of litigation and dispute resolution. In an interview with Asian Legal Business, Tolosa said the firm grew in under two years from two partners to a 19-member legal team and gained a client base of local conglomerates and multinational companies that had traditionally been served by larger firms.

Tolosa's practice has represented multinational companies, local conglomerates, government officials, and corporate executives in civil, criminal, and administrative proceedings before trial and appellate courts and quasi-judicial agencies, with clients spanning the petroleum, construction, energy, telecommunications, water, tollway, banking, aviation, tobacco, and broadcasting industries. He has been recognized by Asia Law Profiles and Legal 500 Asia Pacific as a recommended lawyer for litigation and dispute resolution, and his firm has been recognized by Legal 500 Asia Pacific, Asia Law Profiles, Benchmark Litigation, Asian Legal Business, and the ALB Philippine Law Awards.

=== Notable cases ===
Tolosa was among the defense lawyers for United States Marine Joseph Scott Pemberton, who was tried for the October 2014 killing of Filipino transgender woman Jennifer Laude in Olongapo City. During the proceedings, Tolosa served as a spokesperson for Pemberton's defense team and commented publicly on developments in the case, including the defense's unsuccessful bid to have the charge dismissed and, later, its confidence in an eventual acquittal following Pemberton's conviction. In December 2015, the Olongapo City Regional Trial Court found Pemberton guilty of homicide, rather than the more serious charge of murder, and sentenced him to six to twelve years' imprisonment.

He also represented the broadcast network TV5 in seeking court relief after the Movie and Television Review and Classification Board suspended the airing of the Tulfo brothers' program "T3" in 2012.

== 2026 impeachment trial of Vice President Sara Duterte ==
On June 22, 2026, Batangas 2nd District RepresentativeGerville Luistro, introduced Tolosa as legal spokesperson for the House prosecution panel in the impeachment trial of Vice President Sara Duterte before the Senate. In that role, Tolosa was tasked with articulating the prosecution's legal arguments and developments to the media and the general public. He described the impeachment trial as a pivotal constitutional proceeding and one of the most important accountability mechanisms for public officials under the Philippine Constitution. He served alongside House-designated trial spokespersons Lanao del Sur 1st District Representative Zia Alonto Adiong and Kabataan Representative Renee Co.
