= Sergeant-at-Arms of the Senate of the Philippines =

Elected officer of the Senate of the Philippines

- Tagapamayapa ng Senado ng Pilipinas
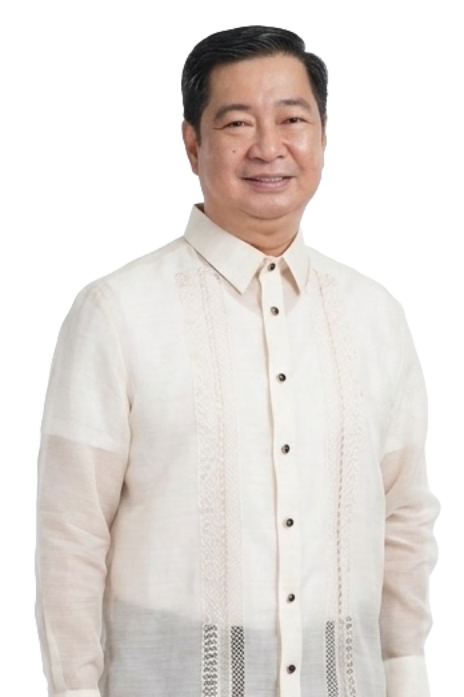
- Incumbent; Alfred Corpus since June 3, 2026
- Senate of the Philippines
- Style: The Honorable
- Seat: GSIS Building, Financial Center, Jose W. Diokno Boulevard, Pasay
- Appointer: Elected by the Senate
- Salary: ₱2,270,000 per year (2023)

The sergeant-at-arms of the Senate of the Philippines (Filipino: Tagapamayapa ng Senado ng Pilipinas), whose office is known as the Office of the Sergeant-at-Arms (OSAA; Tagalog: [ʔoˈsaʔa]), is the officer responsible for maintaining order and security in the Senate of the Philippines under the direction of the Senate president or the secretary of the Senate. The office is also responsible for the physical and logical security of senators, their staff, the offices of the Secretariat, and Senate properties within the premises of the upper chamber of the Congress of the Philippines.

The current Senate sergeant-at-arms is retired Police Major General Alfred Corpus, serving since June 3, 2026.

== Powers and duties ==
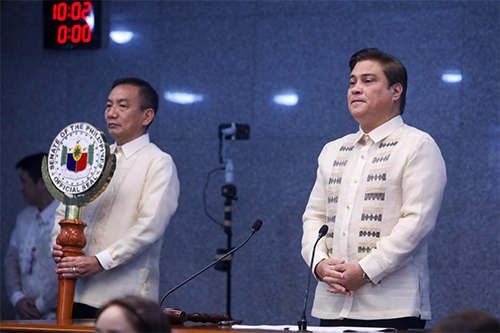
Senate Sergeant-at-Arms Lt. Gen. Roberto T. Ancan, AFP (Ret.), holding the Senate mace, with Senate President Migz Zubiri before the opening of the second regular session of the 19th Congress.

According to Rule VI, Section 8 of the Rules of the Senate, the duties and powers of the Sergeant-at-Arms are:

- To keep under his custody the Mace of the Senate;
- To attend the sessions of the Senate;
- To be responsible for the security and maintenance of order in the session hall, antechambers, corridors and offices of the Senate, and the protection and safety of all its members within or outside the Senate premises, whether in session or not, in accordance with the orders of the President or the Secretary;
- To execute or serve, personally or through his delegates, the summons and subpoenas which may be issued by the Senate, the permanent or special committees, or the President himself;
- To enforce a citation for contempt issued by any committee of the Senate, and to detain and place under custody any witness who disobeys any order of the committee;
- To be responsible for the strict compliance by his subordinates of their respective duties. He may impose upon them corrective or disciplinary measures for just cause, including a recommendation to the President of the Senate, through the Secretary, for their dismissal; and
- To recommend to the President, through the Secretary, approval of the uniform to be worn by the personnel assigned to serve under him in the session hall.

== Sergeants-at-Arms of the Senate ==
The following persons served as Sergeant-at-Arms of the Senate:

| Portrait | Name | Term start | Term end | Legislature | Refs. |
|---|---|---|---|---|---|
| | Manuel Eloriaga | c. 1940s | c. 1940s | 2nd Commonwealth; Congress | |
| | Manuel Eloriaga | c. 1940s | c. 1940s | 1st Congress | |
| | Leon Nazareno | c. 1950s | c. 1950s | 2nd Congress | |
| | Lazaro Zulueta | 1952 | 1960 | 2nd Congress | |
| | Lazaro Zulueta | 1952 | 1960 | 3rd Congress | |
| | Lazaro Zulueta | 1952 | 1960 | 4th Congress | |
Senate abolished (Note: The ratification of the 1973 Constitution abolished the Senate, and a unicameral legislature was established, later known as the Batasang Pambansa. For the list of sergeants-at-arms of the Batasang Pambansa, see Sergeant-at-Arms of the House of Representatives of the Philippines) (January 17, 1973 – July 27, 1987)
| | Clemente Antonio | 1987 | 1993 | 8th Congress | |
| | Clemente Antonio | 1987 | 1993 | 9th Congress | |
| | Liberato Manuel | 1993 | 1994 | 9th Congress | |
| | Antonio de Guzman | 1994 | 1995 | 9th Congress | |
| | Carmelito Beltran | 1995 | 1996 | 10th Congress | |
| | Alberto de Castro | 1996 | February 1998 | 10th Congress | |
| | Leonardo Lopez | February 1998 | April 2002 | 10th Congress | |
| | Leonardo Lopez | February 1998 | April 2002 | 11th Congress | |
| | Leonardo Lopez | February 1998 | April 2002 | 12th Congress | |
| | Jose Balajadia Jr. (1943–2019) | April 2002 | June 30, 2019 | 12th Congress | |
| | Jose Balajadia Jr. (1943–2019) | April 2002 | June 30, 2019 | 13th Congress | |
| | Jose Balajadia Jr. (1943–2019) | April 2002 | June 30, 2019 | 14th Congress | |
| | Jose Balajadia Jr. (1943–2019) | April 2002 | June 30, 2019 | 15th Congress | |
| | Jose Balajadia Jr. (1943–2019) | April 2002 | June 30, 2019 | 16th Congress | |
| | Jose Balajadia Jr. (1943–2019) | April 2002 | June 30, 2019 | 17th Congress | |
| | Edgardo Rene Samonte | July 22, 2019 | August 1, 2022 | 18th Congress | |
| | Edgardo Rene Samonte | July 22, 2019 | August 1, 2022 | 19th Congress | |
| | Roberto T. Ancan (born 1965) | August 1, 2022 | July 28, 2025 | 19th Congress | |
| | Mao Aplasca (born 1963) | July 28, 2025 | February 2, 2026 | 20th Congress | |
| | Edgardo Rene Samonte | February 2, 2026 | May 11, 2026 | 20th Congress | |
| | Mao Aplasca (born 1963); Acting | May 11, 2026 | May 15, 2026 (Note: Suspended by the Office of the Ombudsman for six months on May 15, 2026.) | 20th Congress | |
| | Manuel Parlade; OIC | May 19, 2026 | June 3, 2026 | 20th Congress | |
| | Alfred Corpus | June 3, 2026 | Incumbent | 20th Congress | |

== See also ==
- Sergeant-at-Arms of the House of Representatives of the Philippines
