= Jeremy Lotoc =

Jeremy C. Lotoc (born 1975/1976) is a Filipino lawyer from Leyte. Since January 2026, he has been serving as the regional head of the National Bureau of Investigation for the Bangsamoro region (BARMM).

During his tenure as chief of the NBI Cybercrime Division, Lotoc led the investigation into the 2024 assassination threat of Vice President Sara Duterte towards President Bongbong Marcos, and led an espionage investigation that resulted in the arrest of three alleged spies for China in January 2025.

== Education ==
Lotoc passed the Philippine Bar Examination in 2012. In 2014, Lotoc graduated from the National Bureau of Investigation (NBI) Academy, Batch 47–18.

== Career ==
In 2017, Lotoc was cited as a member the Cybercrime Division of the National Bureau of Investigation (NBI).

From February 2023 to 2025, Lotoc headed both the Cybercrime Division and the Special Task Force of the NBI. In May 2023, the Cybercrime Division under Lotoc made an immediate investigation into multiple bomb threats against the National Privacy Commission, resulting in the arrest of a 37-year-old male suspect in Aklan days after the threats were made. In January 2025, three alleged spies for China (a Chinese male and two Filipino associates) were found and arrested through an investigation done by the NBI Cybercrime Division, with Lotoc holding a press conference on the arrest alongside Chief of Staff Romeo Brawner Jr. of the Armed Forces. In August 2025, Lotoc was appointed NBI regional director for the Mimaropa region, and by 2026, he became regional director for the Bangsamoro Autonomous Region in Muslim Mindanao (BARMM).

In April 2026, during a House Committee on Justice hearing on the impeachment of Vice President Sara Duterte, Lotoc confirmed that the NBI has found evidence that Duterte made contact with a contract killer, which aligned with her assassination threat against President Bongbong Marcos from November 2024.
