= Arturo Lomibao =

Filipino police officer (b. 1950)

Retired Police Director General Arturo C. Lomibao CLH
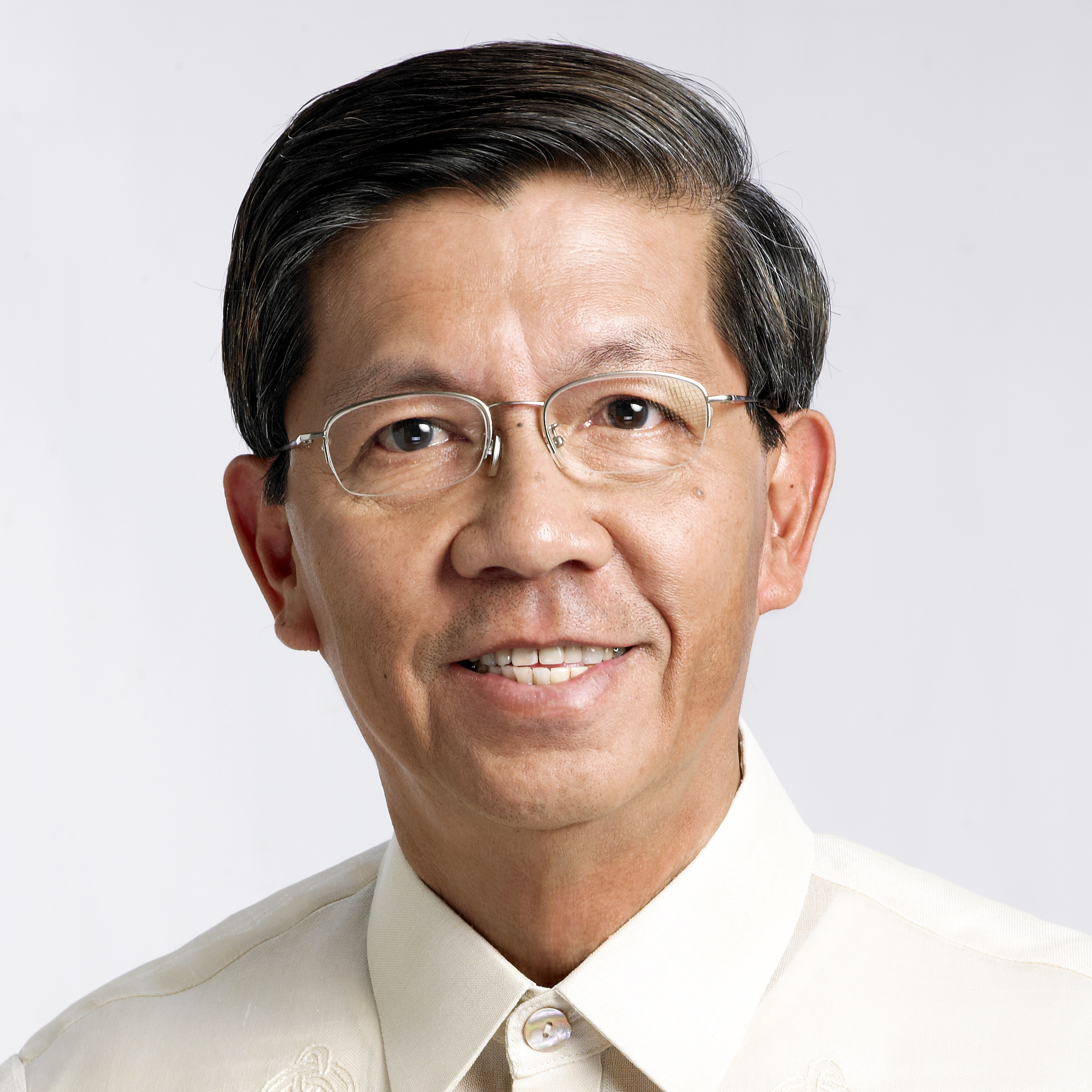

Chief of the Philippine National Police
- In office March 14, 2005 – July 5, 2006
- President: Gloria Macapagal Arroyo
- Preceded by: Edgar Aglipay
- Succeeded by: Oscar Calderon

Undersecretary for Legal Affairs and Strategic Concerns, Department of National Defense
- In office March 2010 – June 2010

Assistant Secretary, Land Transportation Office
- In office February 2009 – March 2010
- Preceded by: Alberto Suansing
- Succeeded by: Alberto Suansing

Undersecretary, Office of the Executive Secretary and Chief, National Counter-Terrorism Action Group (defunct)
- In office March 2008 – Feb 2009
- Succeeded by: Major General Fernando Mesa

Administrator, National Irrigation Administration
- In office Sept 2006 – Feb 2007
- Preceded by: Baltazar Usis
- Succeeded by: Marcelino Tugaoen, Jr. (OIC)

Personal details
- Born: Arturo Carbonel Lomibao; 5 July 1950 (age 76) Mangaldan, Pangasinan, Philippines
- Party: ONE Philippines Party-List (present)
- Spouse: Elizabeth Daoey (m. 1972; died 2003) Jacky Tiu (m. 2008)
- Education: University of the Philippines; Philippine Military Academy (Masigasig Class of 1972); Saint Louis College - Graduate School (1996)

Military service
- Allegiance: Philippines
- Branch/service: Philippine Constabulary (defunct)
- Years of service: 1972-1991
- Rank: Lieutenant Colonel
- Commands: Cagayan Constabulary Command (1988); Nueva Vizcaya Constabulary Command (1986-1988); Regional Security Unit, 1 Constabulary Security Group (1980-1985); Police District 2, 152nd PC Company, Pangasinan Provincial Command (1977-1979)
- Battles/wars: Communist insurgency in the Philippines
- Police career
- Service: Philippine National Police
- Divisions: Directorial Staff, Chief (2004); CIDG, Director (2003); Directorate for Intelligence, Director (2003); Regional Director, Police Regional Offices: 1 (2001) CAR (2001) 3 (1998); Intelligence Group, Director (1997); Public Information Office, Chief (1995); Provincial Director, Provincial Offices - La Union (1992) Camarines Sur (1991)
- Service years: 1991-2006
- Rank: Director General

Arturo Carbonel Lomibao (born July 5, 1950) is a retired Filipino police officer. He served as Chief of the Philippine National Police (PNP) from March 14, 2005 to July 5, 2006, and retired with the rank of 4-star Police Director General.

== Early life and education ==
Lomibao was born in Brgy. Gueguesangen, Mangaldan, Pangasinan on July 5, 1950 to Juan Lomibao and Antonia Carbonel.

He completed his primary education at Gueguesangen Elementary, and secondary education at Mangaldan High School where he graduated Salutatorian. He entered the University of The Philippines to pursue a degree in Engineering, but after two years, entered the Philippine Military Academy. Lomibao graduated as part of the Masigasig Class of 1972 and was commissioned with the rank of 2nd Lieutenant in the now defunct Philippine Constabulary (PC) - at that time, one of the four military service branches of the Armed Forces of the Philippines (AFP) alongside the Philippine Army, Philippine Navy, and Philippine Airforce.

From late 1972–1974, Lomibao attended the Special Intelligence Training School in Fort Bonifacio, Rizal (now Taguig).

From 1990 to 1991, Lomibao attended the Command and General Staff Course at the General Staff College of the AFP, where he was later absorbed as a Police Superintendent following the merger of the PC and Integrated National Police (INP) into the Philippine National Police.

In 1996, Lomibao earned a master's degree in Public Administration from the Saint Louis College in San Fernando, La Union.

== Military career ==
Lomibao's initial posting was in Bontoc, Mountain Province in 1972, as an intelligence officer tasked to prepare operation plans and directives in the campaign against criminality and insurgency, namely against the New People's Army (NPA), the armed wing of the Communist Party of the Philippines (CPP).

From 1974 to 1976, Lomibao was assigned in San Fernando, Pampanga as Team Leader of a special task force under the direct command of 1PC Zone Commander Brigadier General Tomas Diaz; and later, Production Branch Chief of Zone 2's Intelligence Group. During this time, Lomibao conducted and oversaw numerous intelligence operations that led to the capture of hundreds of armed insurgents, including ranking members of local, regional, and national elements of the CPP/NPA.

=== Operation Scorpio ===
In 1975, 1PC Zone launched an intelligence project code-named "OPERATION SCORPIO" to kill or capture Bernabé Buscayno, also known as Kumander Dante, founder and leader of the NPA. Lomibao, then a 1st Lieutenant assigned to the Intelligence Division of 1PC Zone, was the Agent Handler of the Source who had access to the target. After nearly one-year of painstaking intelligence build-up, Dante was captured in a surprise raid at a village in Mexico, Pampanga. The successful mission dealt a serious blow to the local communist movement. Immediately after Dante's capture, then President Ferdinand Marcos flew to Camp Olivas, and promoted Lomibao to the rank of Captain. He was noted as the youngest captain in the Armed Forces of the Philippines.

=== Effective dates of promotion ===
Promotions
Insignia	Rank	Date
	Second Lieutenant	1972
	First Lieutenant	1975
	Captain	1976
	Major	1982
	Lieutenant Colonel	1984

== Police career ==
=== Effective dates of promotion ===
Insignia	Rank	Date
	Police Superintendent	1991
	Police Senior Superintendent	1996
	Police Chief Superintendent	2001
	Police Director	2004
	Police Deputy Director General	2005
	Police Director General	2005

== Decorations and awards ==
=== Armed Forces ===
- Distinguished Service Star
- Bronze Cross Medal - 3x
- Long Service Medal
- Military Civic Action Medal
- Luzon Anti Dissidence Campaign Medal
- Mindanao Anti-Dissidence Campaign Medal & Ribbon
- Philippine Republic Presidential Unit Citation Badge (PRPUCB)
- Martial Law Unit Citation
- People Power I Unit Citation
- Philippine Legion of Honor- Degree of Commander
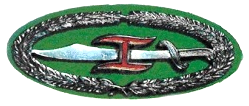
- Combat Commander's (Kagitingan) Badge (CC(K)B) - 6th Level - Battalion Commander
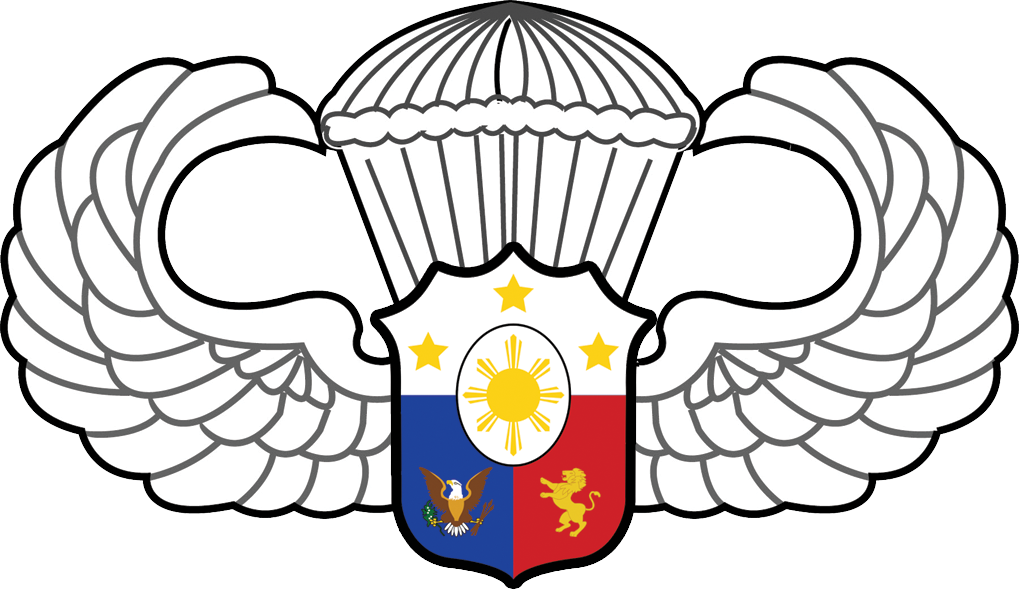
- AFP Parachutist Badge

=== Law Enforcement ===
- Medalya ng Katapatan sa Paglilingkod (PNP Distinguished Service Medal) - 7x
- Medalya ng Paglilingkod (PNP Service Medal) - 2x
- Medalya ng Pambihirang Paglilingkod (PNP Special Service Medal) - 2x
- Medalya ng Kagalingan (PNP Medal of Merit) - 8x
- Medalya ng Kasanayan (PNP Efficiency Medal) - 5x
- Medalya ng Papuri (PNP Commendation Medal) - 6x
- Medalya ng Mabuting Asal (PNP Good Conduct Medal) - 3x
- Medalya ng Paglaban sa Manliligalig (PNP Anti-dissidence Campaign Medal) - 4x
- Medalya ng Paglilingkod sa Luzon (PNP Luzon Campaign Medal)
- Medalya ng Pagtulong sa Nasalanta (PNP Disaster Relief and Rehabilitation Operations Campaign Medal)
- People Power II Unit Citation

=== Others ===
- Philippine Military Academy Alumni Association (PMAAA) Cavalier Award
- Ulirang Ama Award
