= Archie Gamboa =

Former Chief of the Philippine National Police

Retired PGEN Archie Francisco F. Gamboa LLB
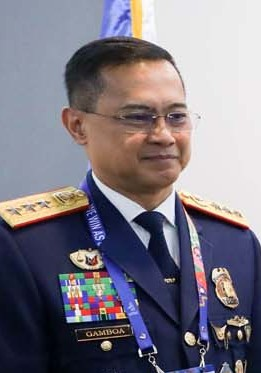
- Gamboa at SEA Games opening in 2019

23rd Chief of the Philippine National Police
- In office January 20, 2020 – September 2, 2020; Officer-in-Charge: October 14, 2019 – January 20, 2020
- President: Rodrigo Duterte
- Preceded by: PGEN Oscar Albayalde
- Succeeded by: PGEN Camilo Cascolan
Previous PNP positions
Deputy Chief for Administration of the Philippine National Police
In office October 12, 2019 – January 20, 2020
President	Rodrigo Duterte
Preceded by	PLTGEN Fernando Mendez Jr.
Succeeded by	PLTGEN Camilo Cascolan
Deputy Chief for Operations of the Philippine National Police
In office August 31, 2018 – October 12, 2019
President	Rodrigo Duterte
Preceded by	PLTGEN Fernando Mendez Jr.
Succeeded by	PLTGEN Camilo Cascolan
Chief of Directorial Staff of the Philippine National Police
In office March 17, 2017 – August 31, 2018
President	Rodrigo Duterte
Preceded by	PDDG Fernando Mendez Jr.
Succeeded by	PDDG Camilo Cascolan
Director of PNP Directorate for Comptrollership
In office July 1, 2016 – March 17, 2017
Deputry Director of PNP Directorate for Logistics
In office June 20, 2016 – July 01, 2016
Executive Officer of PNP Directorate for Logistics
In office September 3, 2015 – June 20, 2016
Regional Deputy Director for Operations of PNP Police Regional Office 4A
In office May 21, 2015 – September 3, 2015
Regional Director for Directorial Staff of PNP Police Regional Office 4A
In office April 13, 2013 – May 21, 2015
Provincial Director of PNP Bukidnon Police Provincial Office
In office May 6, 2005 – January 10, 2007

Personal details
- Born: Archie Francisco Feranil Gamboa; September 2, 1964 (age 62) Malaybalay, Bukidnon, Philippines
- Education: Philippine Military Academy (B.Sc. Mil.); Father Saturnino Urios University (MBA); Ateneo de Davao University; José Rizal University (LL.B.)

Military service
- Allegiance: Philippines
- Branch/service: Philippine Army
- Years of service: 1986–1997
- Police career
- Service: Philippine National Police
- Allegiance: Philippines
- Divisions: PNP Directorate for Administration; PNP Directorate for Operations; PNP Directorial Staff; PNP Directorate for Comptrollership; PNP Directorate for Logistics; PNP Police Regional Office 4A; Bukidnon Police Provincial Office; PNP Police Regional Office 11
- Service years: 1997–2020
- Rank: Police General

Archie Francisco Feranil Gamboa (Tagalog: [ɡɐmˈboʊ.a]; born September 2, 1964) is a Filipino lawyer and retired police general who served as the 23rd Chief of the Philippine National Police from October 2019 to September 2020.

Gamboa was born and raised in Bukidnon and graduated from the Philippine Military Academy in 1986. He served in the Philippine Army's Scout Rangers in Northern Mindanao before joining the police force in 1997 as the spokesperson of the Davao Region Police Office. He was the provincial police chief of Bukidnon from 2005 to 2007 and was later assigned to Camp Crame, Caraga, and Calabarzon. While at Camp Crame, he studied law at José Rizal University and passed the bar exam in 2004. In 2017, he became the Chief of the Directorial Staff, the PNP's fourth-highest position, and rose through the ranks, becoming the Deputy Chief for Administration in 2019—the second-highest position. After Oscar Albayalde's resignation in October 2019 amidst the ninja cops controversy, Gamboa was appointed officer-in-charge (OIC) of the PNP. In January 2020, President Rodrigo Duterte officially appointed Gamboa as PNP Chief. In that capacity, he oversaw the security of the 2019 Southeast Asian Games and the implementation of community quarantines early into the COVID-19 pandemic.

== Early life and education ==
Gamboa is a native of the province of Bukidnon, having been born in Malaybalay on September 2, 1964. He completed his primary education at Maramag's central elementary school and for his secondary education, he attended and graduated from Ateneo de Davao University located in Davao City. In 1982, Gamboa enlisted as a cadet in the Philippine Military Academy in Baguio and graduated as a member of the Sinagtala Class of 1986, the same batch as the two PNP Chiefs that preceded him: Ronald dela Rosa and Oscar Albayalde, as well as his successor, Camilo Cascolan. His contemporary AFP Chiefs, Felimon Santos Jr. and Gilbert Gapay, were also his batchmates.

Gamboa later attained a Master of Business Administration from Father Saturnino Urios University in Butuan in 1995. He then pursued law school at Ateneo de Davao University in 1998 during his stint as spokesman for the Davao Region Police Office in Davao City. After being assigned with the PNP Criminal Investigation and Detection Group in Quezon City in 2002, Gamboa transferred to José Rizal University where he completed his Bachelor of Laws in 2004 and was admitted to the Philippine Bar in May 2005.

== Career ==
Gamboa began his military and policing career as a member of the 1st Scout Ranger Regiment of the Philippine Army deployed to Talakag, Bukidnon to suppress the local communist rebellion in the area. He received a military merit medal and military commendation medal for this assignment. He then spent several years as a battalion command staff member in Northern Mindanao before officially joining the national police force as a spokesperson for the Davao Region Police Office based in Camp Panacan, Davao City in 1997. After four years, Gamboa transferred to the national headquarters of the Philippine National Police as a duty officer of the Criminal Investigation and Detection Group. He spent two years in Camp Crame before returning to Mindanao to serve as provincial police chief in his native Bukidnon in 2005.

As chief of the Bukidnon Provincial Police Office based in Malaybalay, Gamboa initiated programs to significantly reduce crime and stifle the communist insurgency in the province. He was again reassigned in Camp Crame as chief of the Legislative Affairs Center under the PNP Directorate for Plans in 2007 and as chief of the Logistics Resource Management Division under the PNP Directorate for Logistics until 2008. Gamboa then served briefly as chief of the Regional Comptrollership Division of the Caraga Regional Police Office in Butuan until 2009.

Gamboa's other early leadership positions with the national police include serving as chief of the Budget Division of the PNP Directorate for Comptrollership in 2012 and sitting as chief of the Bids and Awards Committee Secretariat Division of the PNP Directorate for Logistics in 2013. Between 2013 and 2015, Gamboa was assigned with the Calabarzon Region Police Office in Calamba, Laguna as regional chief of the Calabarzon PNP Directorial Staff and then as the regional police's Deputy Chief for Operations. As a Calabarzon PNP executive, he initiated measures to achieve a zero backlog in administrative cases of erring personnel using his lawyer skills and experience. Gamboa earned his one-star rank while serving as Executive Officer of the PNP Directorate for Logistics in 2015.

Gamboa then served as deputy director for the logistics directorate before taking on the role of Director for Comptrollership in 2016. As comptrollership chief, he was frequently seen representing the Philippine National Police in budget hearings in the Philippine Senate and House of Representatives. He was also credited for reinstating the combat duty pay and combat incentive pay for PNP personnel and the specialist pay for the Internal Affairs Service and the Maritime Group as comptrollership director. He earned his three-star rank in March 2017 when he was appointed as Chief of the Directorial Staff, the fourth-highest position within the Philippine National Police.

In September 2018, Gamboa became the third-highest ranking PNP official when he was promoted as Deputy Chief for Operations. As deputy chief, he served as task force commander for the 2019 Philippine general election who also oversaw the security preparations and implementation of the 2019 Bangsamoro autonomy plebiscite. He also helped with the internal cleansing drive of the national police by implementing preventive, punitive and restorative measures within the organization amid criticisms of the Philippine drug war. He was again promoted as Deputy Chief for Administration in October 2019 and became PNP's second-in-command.

=== Chief of the Philippine National Police ===
Following Oscar Albayalde's resignation on October 14, 2019 amid the ninja cops controversy, Gamboa was appointed by Interior Secretary Eduardo Año to serve as officer-in-charge of the Philippine National Police, being the second-highest officer in the organization. While the position of PNP Chief remained vacant for months after Albayalde's resignation, President Rodrigo Duterte had tasked Secretary Año to supervise, lead, fix and purge the scandal-ridden national police while Gamboa stays as officer-in-charge. On January 17, 2020, Duterte officially announced his appointment of Lieutenant General Gamboa as PNP Chief.

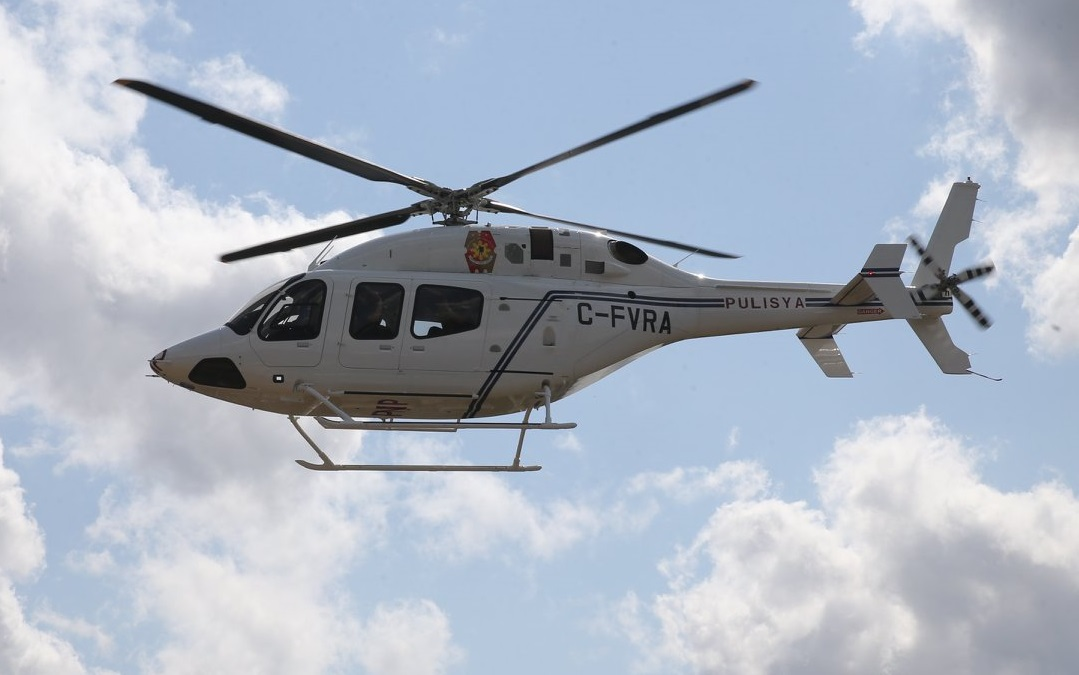
On March 5, 2020, Gamboa survived the crash of a Bell 429 police helicopter.

As then-Officer-in-Charge of the Philippine National Police, he was responsible for the overall police preparations during the 2019 Southeast Asian Games.

On March 5, a Bell 429 helicopter carrying Gamboa and seven other police officials crashed after it hit power cables just after takeoff in San Pedro, Laguna. Gamboa was conscious when he was pulled out from the wreckage; he suffered injuries on his shoulder and right hand and was brought to St. Luke's Medical Center in Taguig. However, two police generals who accompanied Gamboa were in critical condition after the crash, while the others had minor injuries. Gamboa and his entourage had just finished inspecting a facility for impounded vehicles in San Pedro and were on their way to Camp Vicente Lim in nearby Calamba when the crash occurred. LGen Camilo Cascolan, the Deputy Chief for Administration, was the officer-in-charge of the PNP while Gamboa recovered from his injuries. On March 9, Gamboa reported back to work wearing a sling on his right arm.

On March 16, due to the COVID-19 pandemic, Luzon and its associated islands were placed under enhanced community quarantine (ECQ) by President Duterte, while a state of public health emergency was earlier declared for the whole country. To enforce the ECQ, the PNP had set up checkpoints to limit non-essential movement and travel. On March 17, Gamboa announced that people on non-essential travel will be arrested if they insist on passing through the checkpoints. He also acknowledged the shortage of personal protective equipment (PPEs) for the police officers manning the checkpoints. On March 31, Gamboa announced that the nationwide crime rate was reduced by 56% which he attributed to the implementation of the ECQ.

Gamboa tested negative for COVID-19 on April 1, after possible exposure to the disease, as Interior Secretary Eduardo Año tested positive the previous day. Despite having no recent meeting with Año, Gamboa underwent a 14-day quarantine and did not show any symptoms of the disease.

On April 21, Gamboa announced that those who will violate the ECQ in Luzon will not be warned anymore—instead, they would be immediately arrested and undergo inquest proceedings, citing the Bayanihan to Heal as One Act. Explaining the change in policy, Gamboa said: "We need to do this because we also want to mitigate the continued risks faced by frontline PNP personnel who are exposed to increasing number of people and motorists violating the ECQ at checkpoints." At that time, at least 55 PNP personnel have tested positive for COVID-19, while 136,517 people were recorded to have violated the ECQ (of which 31,363 have been arrested, 6,168 fined, and 98,986 were issued warnings). Two days later, he reconsidered his statement saying that more arrests will congest the prisons, some of which already have cases of COVID-19. He said that violators can be required to do community service or fined instead of being detained, explaining that the violators must be punished "to a certain degree" so they would understand the seriousness of the situation.

On April 21, Winston Ragos, a retired soldier with PTSD, was fatally shot by PMSg Daniel Florendo Jr. at a checkpoint in Quezon City. Ragos, who was scolded for violating the ECQ, allegedly attempted to pull out a gun after a heated argument with the police officers. The incident was filmed by a CCTV and phone camera and the footage went viral online. In an interview on CNN Philippines' The Source, Gamboa reacted to the incident: "According to the report, [Ragos] tried to draw his firearm. That's why it resorted to the decision, which was really a judgment call on the part of Florendo on what to do at that very moment". Gamboa also added that the police officers had "no way of knowing" Ragos' mental illness. In a separate interview with ANC, Gamboa explained: "When you are confronted with a person armed with a pistol, its equivalent is also a pistol. When we are confronted with an armed aggressor or a suspect—because a lot of policemen have already died—actually my instruction is really don't let the other person go first." Nonetheless, Gamboa assured that an investigation is underway, and that the PNP is in communication with the Commission on Human Rights, adding: "We have to know all the facts. We sympathize with the family of Ragos, but please give the PNP the trust that we will investigate this case thoroughly." On April 24, Master Sergeant Florendo was charged for homicide.

On April 26, a police officer and a foreigner were involved in a scuffle in Dasmariñas Village, Makati after the officer attempted to arrest the foreigner for allegedly violating the quarantine rules. Spanish expatriate Javier Parra claimed that Senior Master Sergeant Roland Von Madrona wanted to fine him for allowing his housemaid to water plants outside without wearing a face mask—a supposed violation of ECQ guidelines. Madrona and Parra had a heated argument, with Madrona later tackling Parra to the ground in an attempt to arrest him. The incident was filmed by Parra's wife, while Parra eventually escaped into his house (he later revealed he had a pre-existing spinal injury). The police denied Parra's accusations, with a separate video showing Madrona attempting to speak calmly with Parra, who yelled expletives and ordered the police to leave. Madrona's superior also denied that the officer attempted to fine Parra's housemaid, but rather he was going to issue her a ticket violation. The following day, General Gamboa ordered the National Capital Region Police Office (NCRPO) to investigate the incident. Reacting to the aforementioned incident, Gamboa defended the actions of PSMS Madrona, saying: "You saw how big the foreigner is compared to the policeman … based on the video, it is very clear that enough force was applied." (Note: Full quote in mixed Tagalog and English: "Nakita 'nyo naman siguro, your honors, kung gaano kalaki 'yung foreigner compared sa policeman. So really, it will depend. Pero nakita 'nyo naman he was able to subdue the suspect pero medyo nahirapan siya. So based on the video, it is very clear that enough force was applied.") Gamboa later visited Madrona in Makati to personally thank him: "We're behind you. You showed the Filipino people that policemen are not partial; we are impartial. [We're here] to show them that what Madrona did was right, and I hope this message gets across to everybody." (Note: Full quote in mixed Tagalog and English: "Nandito lang ako sa likod mo. You showed the Filipino people that policemen are not partial; we are impartial. [Nandito kami] para ipakita sa kanila na yung ginawa ni Madrona ay tama, and I hope it gets across everybody this message.")

On May 1, Gamboa announced that the PNP is open to investigations regarding alleged human rights violations committed by officers enforcing the ECQ.

On May 12, photos of NCRPO chief Debold Sinas celebrating his birthday on May 8 went viral and drew flak online for allegedly violating the ECQ ban on mass gatherings and liquor. The photos were uploaded by the NCRPO's official Facebook account and were later removed. Gamboa defended Sinas, saying: "No party took place", explaining that it was a mañanita (early morning birthday serenade) which is a tradition among PNP officials. Gamboa also added: "General Sinas said they observed social distancing. I don't think there's any violation here." (Note: Full quote in mixed Tagalog and English: "Walang party ang nangyari, ang sabi ni General Sinas. Probably nagkaroon ng mañanita, pero doon sa mañanita, ang sabi ni General Sinas, is inobserve pa rin nila ang social distancing. I don't think may violation ito") Gamboa was then accused of double standards in punishing ECQ violators. On May 14, Gamboa announced that the PNP Internal Affairs Service (PNP-IAS) will investigate Sinas and his guests. The next day, Sinas and 18 other officers were charged with violating the Bayanihan to Heal as One Act. However, on May 18, Gamboa announced that Sinas will not be dismissed or suspended, describing him as "hard to replace". Gamboa explained his decision: "I hope the public would understand because we're in an emergency situation", citing that Sinas is in charge of several COVID-related programs. (Note: Full quote in mixed Tagalog and English: "Yes. I hope the public would understand kasi nandito tayo sa emergency situation. Pag palitan mo siya, we will never know. Napakahirap palitan dahil ang dami niyang programa in relation to COVID.") On May 20, President Duterte also announced that Sinas will not be dismissed or transferred.

==== Key Positions ====
- Provincial Director, Bukidnon Police Provincial Office
- Deputy Chief for Administration, Police Regional Office 11
- Regional Director, Police Regional Office 4A CALABARZON
- Director, PNP Directorate for Logistics
- Director, PNP Directorate for Comptrollership
- Chief of Directorial Staff
- Deputy Chief PNP for Operations
- Deputy Chief PNP for Administration
  - Officer-in-Charge, PNP (concurrent capacity)
- Chief, PNP

== Awards ==
Gamboa received more than 100 medals and citations throughout his military and law enforcement career, including:

- Military Merit Medal
- Military Commendation Medal
- Medalya ng Katangitanging Gawa (PNP Outstanding Achievement Medal)
- Medalya ng Katapatan sa Paglilingkod (PNP Distinguished Service Medal)
- PMA Alumnus Award
