= Umberto Rodriguez =

Former chief of the Philippine National Police

Chief of the Philippine National Police
- In office May 6, 1993 – July 8, 1994
- President: Fidel Valdez Ramos
- Preceded by: PDGen. Raul Imperial
- Succeeded by: PDGen. Recaredo Sarmiento

Personal details
- Born: Umberto A. Rodriguez
- Education: Philippine Military Academy
- Police career
- Service: Philippine National Police
- Police offices: Caraga PRO (13)
- Rank: Police Director General

Umberto A. Rodriguez is a retired Filipino police officer who served as the Chief of the Philippine National Police from May 6, 1993, to July 8, 1994.

== Career ==
A batch 1961 member of the Philippine Military Academy, he served as the regional director of Caraga regional police, then became PNP chief in 1993.

Police appointments
Preceded by PDGEN Raul Imperial	Chief of the Philippine National Police	Succeeded by PDGEN Recaredo Sarmiento
