= Oscar Calderon =

Former chief of the Philippine National Police (1951–2025)

Retired P/DIR-GEN Oscar Calderon

Director-General of the Bureau of Corrections
- In office December 27, 2007 – October 2010
- President: Gloria Macapagal-Arroyo
- Preceded by: Ricardo Dapat
- Succeeded by: Ernesto Diokno

Chief of the Philippine National Police
- In office July 5, 2006 – October 1, 2007
- President: Gloria Macapagal-Arroyo
- Preceded by: P/Dir. Gen. Arturo Lomibao
- Succeeded by: P/Dir. Gen. Avelino Razon

Personal details
- Born: Oscar Castelo Calderon; October 1, 1951 Aliaga, Nueva Ecija, Philippines
- Died: March 8, 2025 (aged 73)
- Education: Philippine Military Academy
- Police career
- Service: Philippine National Police
- Allegiance: Philippines
- Divisions: Office of the Deputy Chief; Central Luzon Police Regional Office (PRO-3)
- Service years: 1973–2007
- Rank: Police Director General

Oscar Castelo Calderon (October 1, 1951 – March 8, 2025) was a retired Filipino police officer who served as the chief of the Philippine National Police.

== Personal life and education ==
Oscar, the eldest of eight Calderon siblings, was born in Aliaga, Nueva Ecija, on October 1, 1951. At the time of his appointment by then President Gloria Macapagal-Arroyo as chief of the Philippine National Police (PNP), Calderon admitted in a radio interview that he was a "distant relative" of the latter. Shortly before his appointment, his younger brother, Comm. Leonard Calderon, became deputy chief of the Intelligence Service of the Armed Forces of the Philippines.

Calderon was a member of Philippine Military Academy (PMA) class of 1973.

While in duty in Mindanao, he later married Ma. Theresa Larrabaster, a local beauty pageant titlist from General Santos. They had at least three children.

Calderon died on March 8, 2025, at the age of 73. He was later interred at the Heritage Park in Taguig.

== Career ==
=== Early years ===
After graduation from the PMA, he became a junior officer of the then Philippine Constabulary–Integrated National Police (PC–INP).

He spent most of his career in Visayas and Mindanao. Within his first decade in service, he even led campaigns against Moro secessionist rebels, particularly in the provinces of South Cotabato and Maguindanao, and the cities of Zamboanga, General Santos, and Davao while serving as Metro District commander.

He was later assigned at the then Criminal Investigation Service of the PC (which later became the PNP). He headed the Police Anti-Crime Emergency Response and the Senior Officers Promotion Board; and served as well—as the police agency's deputy chief for administration. Also, he was the director for Central Luzon, Southern Tagalog, and Laguna; as well as head of the Directorate for Comptrollership, and deputy of the Directorate for Investigative and Detective Management.

Prior to becoming the PNP chief, he received 41 recognitions from the military and the police, including 18 awards and nine Military Merit Medals. Among them were a Bronze Cross for leading the 1985 rescue operation against a kidnap group in Cebu City; and the PNP Senior Officer of the Year Award (1992). Meanwhile, he was also involved in the arrest of former legislator Dennis Roldan, who had been accused of kidnapping.

=== As PNP Chief ===
In July 2006, Calderon, then police Deputy Director General, became the PNP chief, replacing Director General Arturo Lomibao. He was appointed over contenders such as: Deputy Director Generals, Servando Hizon, PNP comptroller; and Avelino Razon, PNP deputy chief for operations (his future successor).

In his first month in office, on August 1, President Arroyo imposed a ten-week deadline for the solution of high-profile killings of political activists and journalists during her term, particularly at least ten of them; as well as the arrest of suspects. The Department of Justice (DOJ) and the PNP were instructed for the special investigation, which was headed by Task Force Usig and whose deadline was on October 7 but only produced little progress as only few cases were filed. By the second week, Calderon claimed solving two of them.

=== As BuCor chief ===
Almost three months after his retirement from police service, on December 27, 2007, Calderon formally assumed the directorship of the Bureau of Corrections, a day after being appointed by the President to replace Ricardo Dapat following the reported unauthorized trip of another former legislator and rape convict Romeo Jalosjos. It was during his term that Jalosjos was only freed from the New Bilibid Prison in Muntinlupa in 2009.

Calderon was replaced by newly-installed President Benigno Aquino III (Arroyo's successor) in October 2010. In 2011, following the reported unauthorized trip of another former politician and homicide convict Antonio Leviste, DOJ investigators implicated Calderon for alleged special treatment to Leviste, during his term. He was also implicated by a newspaper source in the same case of murder convict Rolito Go.
