= Roberto Lastimoso =

Former chief of the Philippine National Police and transportation official

Retired Police Deputy Director General Roberto Lastimoso

Chairman of the Philippine National Railway Board
- In office March 2017 – June 2022
- President: Rodrigo Duterte

General Manager of the Metro Rail Transit
- In office 2004–2009
- President: Gloria Macapagal Arroyo

Chief of the Land Transportation Office
- In office January 9, 2002 – July 3, 2003
- President: Gloria Macapagal Arroyo
- Preceded by: Edgardo Abenina
- Succeeded by: Agustin Bengzon

Chief of the Philippine National Police
- In office July 11, 1998 – June 15, 1999
- President: Joseph Ejercito Estrada
- Preceded by: PDGen. Santiago Aliño
- Succeeded by: PDDGen. Edmundo Larroza

Personal details
- Born: Roberto Tupaz Lastimoso
- Education: Philippine Military Academy
- Police career
- Service: Philippine National Police
- Service years: 1967–1999
- Rank: Police Deputy Director General (Note: Due to Santiago Aliño's unresolved retirement status, all of the succeeding PNP Chiefs (non-OIC) will only have rank of Police Deputy Director General (3-star rank).)

Roberto "Bobby" Tupaz Lastimoso is a retired Filipino police officer and transportation sector official who served as the Chief of the Philippine National Police from July 1998 to June 1999.

== Police career ==
Lastimoso was graduate of PMA Class of 1967.

After being appointed as PNP chief, Lastimoso wasn't promoted to Director General (4-star general) rank due to Santiago Aliño's being retained to that rank. While he was the PNP chief, he was accused by then-Major General Ping Lacson of trying to protect drug dealers. He also faced graft charges, but was acquitted in 2001.

== Transportation official ==
Lastimoso first served in the transportation sector as chief of the Land Transportation Office (LTO) on January 9, 2002, replacing Edgardo Abenina, and served until July 3, and replaced by Agustin Bengzon. On his time at LTO, he was berated by President Gloria Arroyo before getting replaced.

He also served as General Manager of MRT-3 from 2004 until 2009.

He served as Chairman of the Philippine National Railways Board from 2017 until 2022.

== Note ==
Police appointments
Preceded by PDGEN Santiago Aliño	Chief of the Philippine National Police	Succeeded by PDDGEN Edmundo Larroza (OIC)
