= Raul Imperial =

Former chief of the Philippine National Police

Retired Police Director General Raul Imperial

Chief of the Philippine National Police
- In office August 28, 1992 – May 6, 1993
- President: Fidel Valdez Ramos
- Preceded by: PDGen. Cesar Nazareno
- Succeeded by: PDGen. Umberto Rodriguez

Personal details
- Born: Raul Imperial
- Died: October 24, 2022
- Education: Philippine Military Academy
- Police career
- Service: Philippine National Police
- Rank: Police Director General

Raul S. Imperial (May 26, 1937-October 24, 2022) is a retired Filipino police officer who served as the Chief of the Philippine National Police from August 28, 1992, to May 6, 1993.

== Career ==
Imperial became PNP chief on August 28, 1992. When he was appointed, his predecessor was retired early and retained the 4-star Director General rank. The National Police Commission (NAPOLCOM) decided to retire the predecessor's rank and awarded it to Imperial.

== Personal life ==
Imperial died on October 24, 2022. He was given full honors on his burial.

Police appointments
Preceded by PDGEN Cesar Nazareno	Chief of the Philippine National Police	Succeeded by PDGEN Umberto Rodriguez
