= Cesar Nazareno =

Former chief of the Philippine National Police

Retired Police Director General Cesar Nazareno

Chief of the Philippine National Police
- In office March 31, 1991 – August 28, 1992
- President: Corazon Cojuangco Aquino; Fidel Valdez Ramos
- Preceded by: Position established (Note: PNP formed in 1991, Nazareno is the last Chief of the Philippine Constabulary)
- Succeeded by: PDGen. Raul Imperial

Chief of the Philippine Constabulary
- Director General of the Integrated National Police
- In office March 31, 1990 – March 31, 1991
- President: Corazon Cojuangco Aquino
- Preceded by: BGen. Ramon Montaño
- Succeeded by: Position abolished (Note: Philippine Constabulary abolished, Nazareno is retained as assigned as Chief of the Philippine National Police)

Personal details
- Born: Cesar Pardo Nazareno; December 5, 1940
- Died: October 30, 2006 (aged 65)
- Education: Philippine Military Academy

Military service
- Branch/service: Philippine Constabulary
- Years of service: 1961–1991
- Unit: Regional Command 3 (RECOM3)
- Police career
- Service: Philippine National Police
- Service years: 1991–1992
- Rank: Police Director General

Cesar Pardo Nazareno (December 5, 1940 – October 30, 2006) was a retired Filipino police officer who served as the inaugural Chief of the Philippine National Police from March 31, 1991, until August 28 of 1992.

== Career ==
Nazareno, a Philippine Military Academy class of 1961 member, served in the Philippine Constabulary.

While as a colonel and deputy chief of Western Police District, he was tasked to guard the Mendiola Street in 1987, where the agrarian militants protesting against the administration of Corazon Aquino. His unit was called Task Force Nazareno, named after him. But the protests resulted into a known-massacre.

He served as the chief of its Central Luzon unit, Regional Command 3 (RECOM 3), in 1989 while coup against President Aquino was prevalent. Later, after General Ramon Montaño retired, Nazareno became the Chief of the Philippine Constabulary.

When the military constabulary replaced by the civilianized Philippine National Police, Nazareno was retained and became its inaugural chief in 1991 and served until August 1992.

== Politics ==
Nazareno supported Ping Lacson's 2004 campaign.

== Corruption charges ==
Nazareno have corruption charges involving ghost purchases of combat uniforms and equipment worth P38.2 million. But when died in 2006 with the case still unresolved.

In 2009, the Supreme Court cleared General Nazareno of the charges.

== Death ==
Nazareno died of October 30, 2006 at The Medical City in Pasig.

== Notes ==
Police appointments
Preceded by First holder	Chief of the Philippine National Police	Succeeded by PDGEN Raul Imperial
