= Recaredo Sarmiento =

Former chief of the Philippine National Police

Retired Police Director General Recaredo Sarmiento II

Chief of the Philippine National Police
- In office July 8, 1994 – December 15, 1997
- President: Fidel Valdez Ramos
- Preceded by: PDGen. Umberto A. Rodriguez
- Succeeded by: PDGen. Santiago Aliño

Personal details
- Born: Recaredo A. Sarmiento II; June 24, 1943 Buenavista, Marinduque
- Education: Philippine Military Academy
- Police career
- Service: Philippine National Police
- Divisions: National Capital Region Command; Special Action Force
- Service years: 1966–1997
- Rank: Police Director General

Recaredo A. Sarmiento II was a retired Filipino police officer who served as the Chief of the Philippine National Police from July 8, 1994, until December 15, 1997.

== Career ==
Graduate of Philippine Military Academy class of 1966, Sarmiento served as commander of Special Action Force from June 6, 1992, until January 2, 1994, and National Capital Region Command. He became PNP chief in 1994, surpassing the older batches of class '61 to '65. This move was seen by some as a challenge to the established seniority hierarchy within the PNP. Despite facing criticism and accusations of failed leadership from columnists, Sarmiento completed his term as PNP Chief, which lasted until December 15, 1997.

== Politics ==
Sarmiento supported Ping Lacson's presidential campaigns, first in 2004, and also in 2022. In 2004, he served as provincial chairman of Ping Lacson for President Movement in Quezon.

Police appointments
Preceded by PDGEN Umberto Rodriguez	Chief of the Philippine National Police	Succeeded by PDGEN Santiago Aliño
