= Chief of the Philippine Constabulary =

- Puno ng Hukbóng Pamayapà ng Pilipinas; Jefe de la Constabularía Filipina
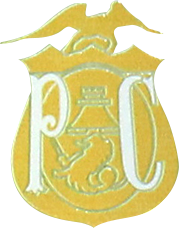
- Department of National Defense (1938); Armed Forces of the Philippines (1935)
- Abbreviation: CPC
- Reports to: Governor-General (1901–1935); President of the Philippine Commonwealth (1935–1942; 1945–1946); President: (thru Secretary of Defense) (1946–1990)
- Residence: Camp Crame, Quezon City
- Appointer: Governor-General (until 1934) President (from 1934); with Senate confirmation (from 1946)
- Term length: 3 years unless remove or promoted to higher AFP position
- Formation: 1901
- First holder: Captain Henry T. Allen, USA
- Final holder: Major General Cesar Nazareno, PC/INP
- Superseded by: Chief of the Philippine National Police (PNP)
- Deputy: Deputy Chief of Philippine Constabulary

The Chief of the Philippine Constabulary (Filipino: Puno ng Hukbóng Pamayapà ng Pilipinas; Spanish: Jefe de la Constabularía Filipina) was the head of the Philippine Constabulary, the former gendarmerie-type military police force of the Philippines from 1901 to 1991 and the predecessor to the modern-day Philippine National Police. It was founded in 1901 by Captain Henry T. Allen. The position is invariably held by a PC Brigadier General until 1976 when it was held by a Major General. Lieutenant General can be attained if the PC officer was appointed Vice Chief of Staff, AFP or General if the PC officer is appointed to Chief of Staff, AFP.

On some occasions several Army and Air Force General officers were appointed Chief of Constabulary, where they go back to their original branch of service after their term.

== Tenure ==
A Colonel or Brigadier General can be appointed Chief of Constabulary by the Governor-General but in 1935 President of the Philippine Commonwealth/Republic of the Philippines. In the initial years there was no limit for the position but in 1935 Philippine Government started to impose term limit of 3 years unless appointed to higher position in the Armed Forces such as Deputy Chief of Staff, AFP, Vice Chief of Staff, AFP or Chief of Staff, AFP they have 3 years in the office unless relieved by the President.

== Duties and responsibilities ==
The Chief of Constabulary shall be directly responsible to the President for the execution of all police duties, responsibilities and functions heretofore pertaining to the Philippine Constabulary and those specifically assigned to him by the President. Subject to the approval of the President he will prescribe and issue regulations for the conduct and administration of the Constabulary. He will administer all laws and regulations affecting personnel of the Constabulary, excepting those pertaining to the procurement of military personnel and the promotion of officers. For purposes of record, he will transmit to the Adjutant General of the Philippine Army such reports and returns as may be necessary to enable that office to maintain permanent records of all personnel. Annual eligibility and efficiency boards appointed in the Army under the orders of the President will include proportionate representation from the Constabulary.

== Residence and headquarters ==
=== Old Gagalangin Barracks ===
It is the first headquarters of PC and where the Chief of Constabulary held his office. It was its official home from 1901 to 1935, until new Camp was constructed by PC in a new tract of land given by City of Manila in exchange for the Old Barracks.

=== Camp Crame ===
Since 1935, then Constabulary Chief Brigadier General Basilio Valdes constructed building around the tract of land New Manila Heights in Quezon City provided by City of Manila in exchange for the Old Barracks. He named the camp after the first Filipino Constabulary Chief Brigadier General Rafael Crame. It has been the official headquarters of PC since 1935 to 1991. Now it is the official headquarters of Philippine National Police the successor of PC/INP since it was deactivated in 1991.

== Headquarters organization ==
Headquarters Directorates:

- 1. Directorate for Personnel
- 2. Directorate for Human Resource and Doctrine Development
- 3. Directorate for Logistics,
- 4. Directorate for Research and Development
- 5. Directorate for Comptrollership,
- 6. Directorate for Plans,
- 7. Directorate for Police-Community Relations,
- 8. Directorate for Investigation and
- 9. Directorate for Special Staff

== List ==
The following lists people who have assumed the position of Chief of the Philippine Constabulary since its creation to its deactivation. This includes people who served as Officer in Charge (OIC) of the PC. This excludes OIC tenure due to temporary incapacitation of filing of a leave of absence of the incumbent – who would later resume fulfilling their duties.

No.	Name	Citizenship	Term	Notes	Ref
Commander of Philippine Constabulary					
1	Capt./Brig. GeneralHenry T. Allen	US	June 1901 – August 1907	Founding Commander, served in France during World War I. Commanded 90th US Infantry Division.	
2	Col. Harry Hill Bandholtz	US	August 1907 – 1910	He served as assistant Chief from 1903 - 1909. He was acting chief while General Allen was in US. He would resumed as Assistant Chief under General Smith 1910 - 1913.	
3	Col. Cornelius C. Smith	US	1910–1912		
4	Brig. Gen. James G. Harbord	US	1912		
5	Brig. Gen. William C. Rivers	US	1913 - 1914	He served as assistant Chief of Constabulary from 1905 to 1913 before appointed as Chief.	
6	Brig. Gen. Herman Hall	US	1914–1917		
7	Brig. Gen. Rafael Crame	PHI	1917–1927	First Filipino Commander (1917–1927);	
8	Brig. Gen. Carl Nathorst	US	1927–1932	Swedish Soldier who enlisted in US Army and deployed in the Philippines in 1899 with Minnesota Volunteers. He was appointed in the Constabulary until promoted to Brigadier General as head of the organization.	
9	Brig. Gen. Lucien R. Sweet	US	1932		
10	Brig. Gen. Clarence H. Bowers	US	1932–1934		
11	Brig. Gen. Basilio J. Valdes	PHI	1934–1935	from 1934	
12	Brig. Gen. Charles Livingston	US	1935–1937	He served an Army Provost Marshal General and head of Army Constabulary Division in 1936, after appointed by the Army Chief of Staff.	
13	Maj. Gen. Jose Delos Reyes	PHI	1936–1937	He served an Army Provost Marshal General after serving acting Chief of Staff in 1936, he also was the con-current commander of Constabulary Division, PA while being a Provost Marshal General. He retired and later served Chief of Bureau of Constabulary during Japanese Occupation.	
14	Col. Juan Dominguez	PHI	1937–1938	He also was the concurrent commander of Constabulary Division, PA while being a Provost Marshal General. Succeeding General Delos Reyes who retired in May 1938. Later served as Chief of Police of Manila.	
14	Brig. Gen. Guillermo Francisco	PHI	1938–1942	1938 – 1941; resumed under Japanese Occupation until 1945	
Bureau of Constabulary (Japanese Occupation)					
15	Brig. Gen. Jose Delos Reyes	PHI	November 1942 – April 1943	Appointed by Japanese Occupiers as Director for Bureau of Constabulary. Former acting Army Chief of Staff.	
16	Brig. Gen. Guillermo Francisco	PHI	April 1943 – October 1944	Appointed by President Laurel as Director for Bureau of Constabulary	
17	Maj. Gen. Paulino Santos	PHI	October 1944 – 1945	Recalled by President Laurel from retirement to be the head of Bureau of Constabulary, however was captured by Japanese for helping people and guerillas after assuming the position. He died in Kianga, Ifugao as he was not allowed by Japanese captors to go American hospital for treatment.	
Liberation to Martial Law Years					
18	Brig. Gen. Federico G. Oboza	PHI	1945–1946		
19	Brig. Gen. Mariano Castañeda	PHI	1946–1948	Became Chief of Staff and Medal of Valor Awardee	
20	Brig. Gen. Alberto Ramos	PHI	1948–1950	Relieved by President Quirino upon the recommendation of Defense Secretary Magsaysay. He was appointed Presidential Adviser on Police Affairs and later Director of National Bureau of Investigation.	
21	Brig. Gen. Florencio Selga	PHI	1950–1955		
22	Brig. Gen. Manuel Cabal	PHI	1955–1957	Became Chief of Staff in 1959	
23	Brig. Gen. Pelagio A. Cruz	PHI	1958–1958	Returned to PAF after his term and appointed as Chief of Staff in 1961	
24	Brig. Gen. Isagani Villoria Campo	PHI	1958–1961		
25	Brig. Gen. Nicanor Garcia	PHI	1961–1963		
26	Brig. Gen. Dominador Garcia	PHI	1963		
27	Brig. Gen. Godofredo F. Mendoza	PHI	1964		
28	Brig. Gen. Vicente M. Yngente	PHI	1964		
29	Brig. Gen. Flaviano Olivares	PHI	1965–1966		
30	Brig. Gen. Segundo P. Velasco	PHI	1966–1967	Became AFP Chief of Staff in 1967	
31	Brig. Gen. Manuel Yan	PHI	1967–1968	Became youngest AFP Chief of Staff in 1968	
32	Brig. Gen. Vicente Raval	PHI	1968–1970		
33	Brig. Gen. Eduardo Garcia	PHI	1970–1972		
Chief of Philippine Constabulary/Director General of Integrated National Police					
34	Lt. Gen. Fidel Valdez Ramos	PHI	1972–1986	Served as acting AFP Chief of Staff from 1984 to 1985 and Vice AFP Chief of Staff while concurrent PC Chief in 1984 to 1986 before EDSA Revolution. He became AFP Chief of Staff in 1986 after EDSA Revolution, later Defense Secretary and President of the Philippines from 1992 to 1998.	
35	Lt. Gen. Renato de Villa	PHI	1986–1988	was concurrent Vice Chief of Staff of AFP while in the position. He was appointed as AFP Chief of Staff in 1988 to 1991.	
36	Maj. Gen. Ramon Montaño	PHI	1988 – 1990	Former CAPCOM commander	
37	Maj. Gen. Cesar P. Nazareno	PHI	1990 – March 1991	Last chief before disbandment	

== See also ==
- Armed Forces of the Philippines
- Philippine National Police
- Chief of Philippine National Police
- Chief of Staff of the Armed Forces of the Philippines
- Vice Chief of Staff of the Armed Forces of the Philippines
- Deputy Chief of Staff of the Armed Forces of the Philippines
