= Rafael Jalandoni =

Filipino Constabulary officer

Major General Rafael Jalandoni

5th Mayor of Iloilo City
- In office 1950–1952
- Preceded by: Vicente Ybiernas
- Succeeded by: Juan Borja

3rd Chief of Staff of the Armed Forces of the Philippines
- In office December 21, 1947 – December 20, 1948
- President: Manuel Roxas
- Preceded by: Basilio Valdes
- Succeeded by: Mariano Castañeda

Chief of Staff of the Philippine Army
- In office December 21, 1945 – December 1, 1946
- President: Sergio Osmeña; Manuel Roxas
- Preceded by: Basilio Valdes
- Succeeded by: Mariano Castañeda

Personal details
- Born: October 24, 1894 Pontevedra, Negros Occidental, Captaincy General of the Philippines
- Died: unknown
- Education: Philippine Constabulary Academy

Military service
- Allegiance: Philippine Commonwealth
- Branch/service: Philippine Constabulary; Philippine Army
- Years of service: 1922-1948
- Rank: Major General
- Commands: 4th PC Regiment; PC Central Luzon District; Military Aide to the President of the Philippine Commonwealth
- Battles/wars: World War II; Hukbalahap Rebellion

Rafael Ledesma Jalandoni (October 24, 1894 – ?) was a Philippine Constabulary officer who served as the 3rd Chief of Staff of the Armed Forces of the Philippines. He was appointed by President Manuel Roxas in 1946 after gaining independence from United States. He retired in 1948.

== Early life ==
Jalandoni was born in Pontevedra, Negros Occidental to Manuel Jalandoni and Paula Ledesma. He commanded the 3rd PC Regiment in Mindanao and later served as an aide of President Manuel L. Quezon. He was in command of the PC Department of Central Luzon at the start of the Pacific War in 1941.

== World War II ==
He served during World War II fighting Japanese forces in Southern Luzon and Bataan. He commanded the 3th Infantry (PC) Regiment of the 2nd Regular Division activated in Bataan under the command of MGen. Guillermo Francisco, the concurrent chief of the Philippine Constabulary. He was a POW when the Luzon Force surrendered on April 9, 1942. He endured the Bataan Death March and was imprisoned at Capas Internment Camp. He was released in August of that year along with all Filipino soldiers.

== Post-war and later career ==
After the war, on December 18, 1945, Jalandoni, then Army Deputy Chief of Staff, was promoted by Commonwealth President Sergio Osmeña from vice brigadier-general to brigadier-general, and was appointed as Chief of Staff, replacing Basilio Valdes; effective on December 21. By 1946, Jalandoni became a major general.

During his tenure, in 1947, the military was reorganized; mainly in line with the "Government Reorganization Plan" issued by President Manuel Roxas in October. Later that month, Jalandoni issued General Orders No. 228, renaming the designation Army of the Philippines to Armed Forces of the Philippines (AFP); effectively placing him as its Chief of Staff. Jalandoni was replaced by Mariano Castañeda on December 16, 1948.

On April 28, 1949, Jalandoni accompanied former first Lady Aurora Quezon, widow of former President Manuel L. Quezon on her way to the town of Baler, together with her daughter Maria Aurora (Baby) Quezon, son-in-law Felipe Buencamino III, and grandson to unveil a marker in memory of her late husband. In Bongabon, Nueva Ecija, their vehicle was ambushed by Hukbalahap rebels, leaving Jalandoni as the only survivor after he was knocked unconscious when he was hit in the head by a pistol butt.

In early 1950, Jalandoni was appointed mayor of Iloilo City; serving until 1952.
