= Edmundo Larroza =

Former chief of the Philippine National Police

Retired Police Deputy Director General Edmundo Larroza

Chief of the Philippine National Police
- In office June 16 – November 16, 1999
- President: Joseph Ejercito Estrada
- Preceded by: PDDGen. Roberto Lastimoso (Note: Due to Santiago Aliño's unresolved retirement status, all of the succeeding PNP Chiefs (non-OIC) will only have rank of Police Deputy Director General (3-star rank).)
- Succeeded by: PDGen. Panfilo Lacson

Personal details
- Born: Edmundo Lavilla Larroza
- Died: May 28, 2023
- Education: Philippine Military Academy
- Police career
- Service: Philippine National Police
- Police offices: Northern Mindanao PRO (10)
- Rank: Police Deputy Director General

Edmundo Lavilla Larroza (died May 28, 2023) is a retired Filipino police officer who served as the Chief of the Philippine National Police from June 16 until November 16 of 1999, before being replaced by Panfilo Lacson. He was notable for serving as regional director of Northern Mindanao Regional Police from June 14, 1996 until January 7, 1997.

== Notes ==
Police appointments
Preceded by PDDGEN Roberto Lastimoso	OIC Chief of the Philippine National Police	Succeeded by PDGEN Panfilo Lacson
