= Jose de los Reyes =

Philippine Constabulary officer

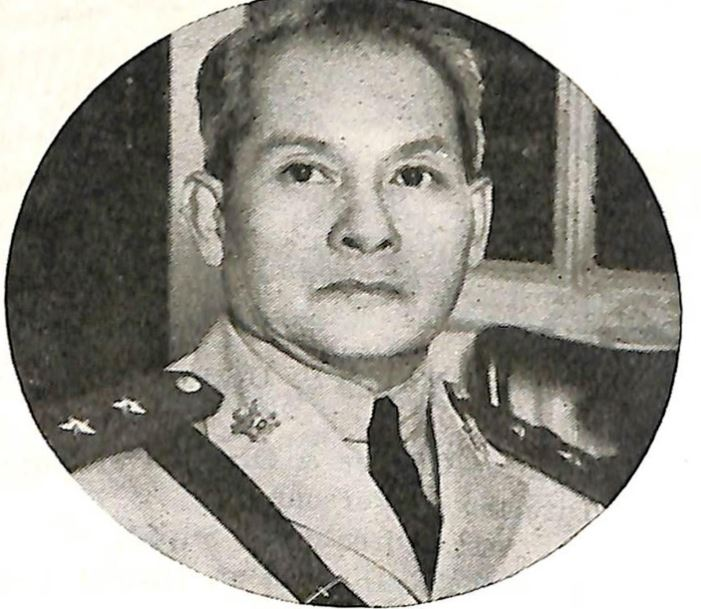
- Photograph from Cornejo's Commonwealth Directory of the Philippines, 1939

Chief of the Philippine Constabulary
- Director, Bureau of Constabulary (Japanese Occupation)
- In office November 1942 – April 1943
- President: Jose P. Laurel
- Vice President: Ramon Avanceña
- Preceded by: New
- Succeeded by: Guillermo B. Francisco

Provost Marshal General, Philippine Army
- In office May 4, 1936 – April 3, 1938
- President: Manuel L. Quezon
- Vice President: Sergio Osmeña
- Preceded by: Basilio Valdes
- Succeeded by: Guillermo B. Francisco

Chief of Staff, Philippine Army
- In office December 21, 1935 – May 3, 1936
- President: Manuel L. Quezon
- Preceded by: Antonio Luna
- Succeeded by: Paulino Santos

Chief of Bureau of Customs Service
- In office 1935 – December 21, 1935
- President: Manuel L. Quezon
- Leader: Elpidio Quirino
- Preceded by: Vicente Aldenese
- Succeeded by: Guillermo Gomez

Assistant Chief of Constabulary
- In office August 24, 1918 – October 16, 1930
- Governor-General: Francis Burton Harrison

Personal details
- Born: Jose Delos Reyes; August 19, 1874 Bulakan, Bulacan; Captaincy General of the Philippines
- Died: February 7, 1945 (aged 70) Manila, Philippines
- Education: Colegio de San Juan de Letran
- Occupation: Soldier; Public Servant
- Profession: Soldier; Clerk of Court

Military service
- Branch/service: Philippine Army; Philippine Constabulary; Philippine Scouts; Philippine Republican Army
- Years of service: 1898 - 1945
- Rank: Major general
- Commands: Bureau of Constabulary; Constabulary Division,Philippine Army; Philippine Army; Manila Garrison, PC

Jose de los Reyes was a Filipino military officer who served as the first Chief of Staff in acting capacity appointed by President Manuel L. Quezon in 1936. He served in acting capacity while waiting for the assumption of General Paulino Santos the original choice of President Quezon who was still completing his term as Director of Bureau of Corrections.

== Japanese occupation ==
After the conclusion of Japanese invasion campaign in 1942, all constabulary officers are rounded and force into service to new Bureau of Constabulary. He served as its first Director from November 1942 to April 1943, succeeded by another pre-war Constabulary Chief General Francisco. He was executed by the Japanese in February 1945 along with other military prisoners of war during the Battle of Manila. Along with thousands of citizens massacred, his body was not recovered.

== See also ==
- List of Chief of Staff of the Armed Forces of the Philippines
- Chief of Philippine Constabulary

Military offices
Preceded by Antonio Luna	Commanding General of the Philippine Army; January 11, 1936 – May 3, 1936	Succeeded by Paulino Santos
Preceded by Antonio Luna	Chief of Staff of the Armed Forces of the Philippines; January 11, 1936 – May 3, 1936	Succeeded by Paulino Santos
Preceded by Guillermo B. Francisco(Philippine Commonwealth)	Chief Bureau of Constabulary (Under Japanese Occupation); November 11, 1942 – April 3, 1943	Succeeded by Guillermo B. Francisco
