= Oscar Albayalde =

Former Chief of the Philippine National Police

Retired PGEN Oscar David Albayalde OLH
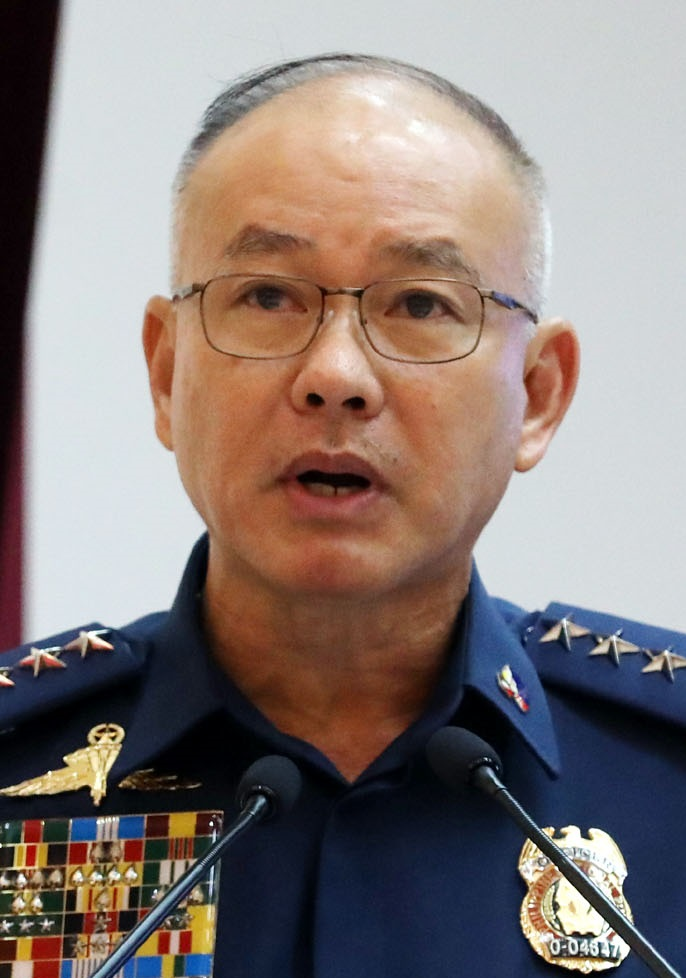
- Albayalde in 2018

22nd Chief of the Philippine National Police
- In office April 19, 2018 – October 14, 2019
- President: Rodrigo Duterte
- Preceded by: PDG Ronald dela Rosa
- Succeeded by: PGEN Archie Gamboa

Regional Director of the National Capital Region Police Office
- In office July 4, 2016 – April 19, 2018
- President: Rodrigo Duterte
- Preceded by: PDIR Joel Pagdilao
- Succeeded by: PDIR Camilo Cascolan

Personal details
- Born: Oscar David Albayalde; November 8, 1963 (age 62) San Fernando, Pampanga, Philippines
- Party: PRP (2024–present)
- Education: Philippine Military Academy (BS); Manuel L. Quezon University (MPA)
- Police career
- Service: Philippine National Police
- Allegiance: Philippines
- Divisions: National Capital Region Police Office; PNP Directorate for Plans; Pampanga Police Provincial Office
- Service years: 1986–2019
- Rank: Police General

Oscar David Albayalde OLH GCrH (Tagalog: [albɐˈjaldɛ]; born November 8, 1963) is a retired Filipino police officer who served as the Chief of the Philippine National Police from April 2018 until his optional retirement in October 2019.

== Early life and education ==
Albayalde was born on November 8, 1963, in San Fernando, Pampanga, the son of Philippine Air Force retired master sergeant Fidel S. Albayalde and Consolacion David.

He studied at the University of the Assumption in San Fernando, Pampanga for two years, from 1980 to 1982, and then entered the Philippine Military Academy, because of the influence of his father. At the PMA, Albayalde had a Bachelor of Science degree and graduated cum laude on March 22, 1986, after constantly landing in the dean, academic and superintendent's lists. He is a member of the Philippine Military Academy Sinagtala Class of 1986 and his classmates or "mistah" includes his predecessor, former Bureau of Corrections Director and now Senator Ronald dela Rosa.

After graduating, he became a member of the elite Special Action Force. From 1995 to 1996, Albayalde undertook further studies earning him a master's degree in Public Administration from the Manuel L. Quezon University.

== Career ==
Before becoming the director of the NCRPO, Albayalde served as the provincial police chief of Pampanga. However, in 2014, he was dismissed from his post following a drug-related operation conducted by police in Mexico, Pampanga. The case against him was later dismissed.

=== Key positions ===
- Provincial director, Pampanga Police Provincial Office
- Deputy director, PNP Directorate for Plans
- Regional director, NCRPO
- Chief, PNP

=== As NCRPO regional director ===
In July 2016, Albayalde was appointed as the regional director of the National Capital Region Police Office. He was known to be a disciplinarian in his commands during his stint, conducting surprise inspections in various police stations in Metro Manila resulting in the dismissal of cops caught sleeping and drinking while on duty. It was during his time that the entire Caloocan Police Force and its officers were dismissed following the deaths of Kian Delos Santos and Carl Angelo Arnaiz. He was also instrumental in the preparations for the 2017 ASEAN Summits and was in command of the police response during the 2017 Resorts World Manila attack.

=== As PNP chief ===
Following the retirement of Ronald dela Rosa, Albayalde was appointed Philippine National Police Chief by President Rodrigo Duterte in April 2018. During his stint as PNP commander, he oversaw the early security preparations for the 2019 Philippine general elections as a result of a series of high-profile killings including that of AKO Bicol party-list representative Rodel Batocabe.

Albayalde oversaw the Philippine drug war during his term as PNP chief. A day after he assumed his post as PNP chief, the police killed 13 drug suspects in Bulacan. As of May 2018, the PNP reported the killing of 4,251 drug personalities during the Philippine drug war, while Human Rights Watch estimated around 12,000 killings during the drug war. Albayalde stated that the PNP was winning the war on drugs. Albayalde announced that the PNP's Oplan Double Barrel will continue and that Oplan Tokhang under him would be more relentless.

Albayalde was implicated in a controversy involving the case of the 13 officers of the Pampanga police, who were branded as "ninja cops" by the media. The officers were alleged to have profited from methamphetamine seized from an operation in 2013 against a suspected Chinese drug lord and Albayalde who was the chief of the Pampanga police at the time was accused of intervening of the case by seeking the dismissal order against his former subordinates. Albayalde was also alleged to have benefited from the selling of the seized contraband. Albayalde denied the accusations. The Makabayan bloc demanded the immediate resignation of Albayalde and other officials.

He resigned from his position as police chief and went on non-duty status on October 14, 2019, which meant he remained a member of the police. He was set to officially retire from the police force on November 8, 2019, upon reaching the mandatory retirement age of 56 and to hand over his position as chief on October 29, 2019, had he not resigned. According to the government, Albayalde stepped down in a bid to spare the Philippine National Police from the controversy and denied pressuring Albayalde to do so. He became the first PNP chief to go into non-duty status.

The Department of Justice indicted Albayalde for graft and corruption in January 2020. The Office of the Ombudsman dismissed the case in November 2021, citing lack of sufficient evidence.

In December 2024, the House of Representatives Quad Committee recommended the filing of charges against former President Rodrigo Duterte, Albayalde, and senators Bato dela Rosa and Bong Go over drug war killings under Duterte.

On February 13, 2026, the International Criminal Court included Albayalde among eight indirect co-perpetrators in the crimes against humanity case against president Duterte during the Philippine drug war.

== Political career ==
In 2025, he ran as mayor of Angeles City under the People's Reform Party banner but lost to Carmelo Lazatin II.

== Personal life ==
He is called "Odie" or "Oca" by his peers. Albayalde is married to Cherrylyn Albayalde, and they have four children. His hobbies include skydiving, scuba diving and motorcycle riding.

== Electoral history ==
Electoral history of Oscar Albayalde
Year	Office	Party	Votes received				Result
Year	Office	Party	Total	%	P.	Swing	Result
2025	Mayor of Angeles City	PRP	58,953	37.53%	2nd	—N/a	Lost

== Awards ==
- Philippine Republic Presidential Unit Citation
- Philippine Legion of Honor - Degree of Officer
- People Power II Unit Citation
- Medalya ng Katapatan sa Paglilingkod (PNP Distinguished Service Medal)
- Medalya ng Katangitanging Gawa (PNP Outstanding Achievement Medal)
- Medalya ng Pambihirang Paglilingkod (PNP Special Service Medal)
- Military Commendation Medal
- Medalya ng Kagalingan (PNP Medal of Merit)
- Medalya ng Kasanayan (PNP Efficiency Medal)
- Medalya ng Ugnayang Pampulisya (PNP Police Relations Medal)
- Medalya ng Paglilingkod (PNP Service Medal)
- Medalya ng Pagtulong sa Nasalanta (PNP Disaster Relief and Rehabilitation Operations Campaign Medal
- Tsapa Sa Natatanging Unit (PNP Unit Citation Ribbon)
- People Power I Unit Citation
- People Power II Unit Citation
- Paglilingkod sa Santo Papa (PNP Pope Francis Medal)
- Medalya ng Paglilingkod Laban sa Krimimalidad (PNP Anti-Criminality Medal)
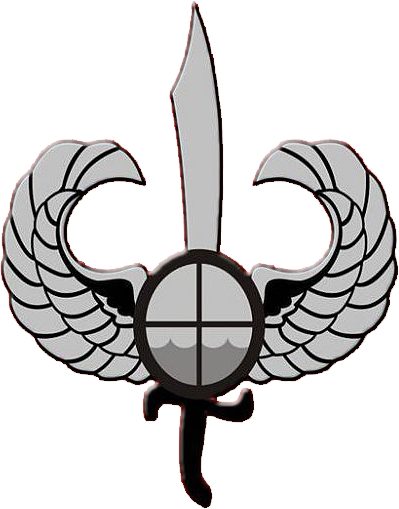
- Special Action Force Badge
- Master PNP Parachutist Badge
- Master AFP Military Freefall Badge
- AFP Joint Command and General Staff Course Badge
