= Santiago Aliño =

Former chief of the Philippine National Police

Chief of the Philippine National Police
- In office December 15, 1997 – July 10, 1998
- President: Fidel Valdez Ramos; Joseph Ejercito Estrada
- Preceded by: PDGen. Recaredo Sarmiento II
- Succeeded by: PDDGen. Roberto Lastimoso (Note: Due to Santiago Aliño's early retirement unresolved status, all of the succeeding PNP Chiefs (non-OIC) will only have rank of Police Deputy Director General (3-star rank).)

Personal details
- Born: Santiago L. Aliño
- Education: Philippine Military Academy
- Police career
- Service: Philippine National Police
- Rank: Police Director General

Santiago L. Aliño is a retired Filipino police officer who served as the Chief of the Philippine National Police from December 15, 1997, to July 10, 1998.

== Police career ==
Aliño was notable for being the last PNP chief President Fidel Ramos appointed, and overseeing the 1998 presidential elections. His tenure also oversee the formalization of PNP Internal Affairs Service created pursuant to Republic Act (RA) 8551 otherwise known as "The PNP Reform and Reorganization Act of 1998".

Due to Aliño's early retirement made two of his successor did not obtain the rank of 4-star Director General. One of them is Panfilo Lacson, who only got the rank in March 2000.

== Notes ==
Police appointments
| Preceded by PDDGEN Recaredo Sarmiento | Chief of the Philippine National Police | Succeeded by PDDGEN Roberto Lastimoso |
