= Paulino Santos =

Filipino general (1890–1945)

Major General Paulino Santos
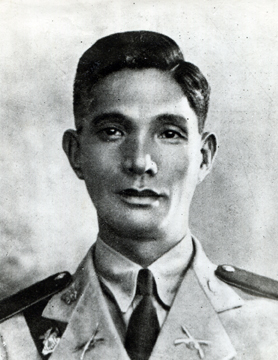

Chief of the Philippine Constabulary
- Director, Bureau of Constabulary
- In office 1944–1945
- President: Jose P. Laurel
- Preceded by: Guillermo B. Francisco
- Succeeded by: Federico Oboza

General Manager of the National Land Settlement Administration
- In office January 27, 1939 – 1944
- President: Manuel L. Quezon
- Preceded by: Position established
- Succeeded by: Albert Morrow

Chief of Staff of the Philippine Army
- In office May 6, 1936 – December 31, 1938
- Preceded by: José delos Reyes
- Succeeded by: Basilio Valdes

Director of the Bureau of Prisons
- In office 1930–1936

Governor of Lanao
- In office 1920–1923

Personal details
- Born: Paulino Torres Santos; June 22, 1890 Camiling, Tarlac, Captaincy General of the Philippines
- Died: August 29, 1945 (aged 55) Kiangan, Ifugao, Philippine Commonwealth
- Spouse: Elisa Angeles
- Children: 7 (incl. Rosa)
- Occupation: Civil servant; soldier
- Profession: Law enforcement

Military service
- Allegiance: Philippine Commonwealth
- Branch: Philippine Army; Philippine Constabulary
- Service years: 1914–1945 (officer); 1906–1912 (enlisted)
- Rank: Major General

Paulino Torres Santos Sr. (June 22, 1890 – August 29, 1945) was a Filipino military officer who was Commanding General of the Philippine Army from 1936 to 1938. Concurrently, he is considered the first official Chief of Staff of the Armed Forces of the Philippines. Upon his retirement, he served as a civilian administrator under President Manuel L. Quezon, facilitating the settlement and cultivation of agricultural lands in Mindanao. The city of General Santos is named after him, having been renamed from Buayan in 1954.

== Early life ==
Paulino Torres Santos was born in Camiling, Tarlac to Remigio Santos and Rosa Torres. After his Spanish education from 1897 to 1900, he enrolled in an English school in 1901. In 1907, when he had finished the sixth grade, he was appointed as municipal teacher in Camiling and Gerona, a post which he held until the following year. In 1908, he attempted to enlist in the United States Navy in Cavite, but a temporary halt on the recruitment of Filipino natives prevented him from joining. He then moved on to Manila, where he found work at an aerated-water factory in Tondo, earning seven pesos a month for daily labor.

A year afterward, he joined the Philippine Constabulary and was assigned to the First General Service Company. By 1912, he had advanced from private to supply sergeant, while also serving as a civil service clerk at the PC headquarters. That same year, he enrolled in the Constabulary Officers' School wherein, two years later, he graduated valedictorian and was appointed as Third Lieutenant. At the same time, he continued his academic studies, eventually completing high school.

== Personal life ==
On January 22, 1918, Santos married Elisa Angeles of Bulacan, with whom he had seven children: Rosa, Isabel, Lourdes, Paulino Jr., Remigio, Elisa, and Jose.

== Early military service (1916–1930) ==
As a soldier, Santos served in the Lanao campaign in 1916, where he sustained wounds from a Moro spear, and in the Bayang Cota campaign in 1917, where he was wounded anew, but this time by bullets. As government cannons were bombarding the Muslim bulwark of Lumamba, Lieutenant Santos led his platoon in penetrating the formerly secure redoubt, through an opening made in the barricade, and immediately erected a ladder to scale the first kota. Immediately, he and his men engaged its defenders in a bloody hand-to-hand combat, killing 30 of them, and thus preserving the lives of government soldiers. For this exceptional military feat, Governor General Frank Murphy bestowed on him the Medal of Valor, the highest Philippine military award for "gallantry in action", just before the inauguration of the Commonwealth government in 1935.

== Public service and return to military service (1930–1938) ==
In 1930, after his retirement from the Constabulary, Santos would be appointed Director of the Bureau of Prisons. He was primarily responsible for the founding of the Davao Penal Colony in 1932 and overseeing the transfer of the national prison from its old site in Manila to a new one in Muntinlupa in 1935. Later that year, he would be named as aide-de-camp to President Manuel Quezon's inaugural ceremony, accompanying the President from the Legislative Building to the Malacañang Palace.

In early 1936, he was recalled to military service through his appointment as brigadier general and assistant chief of staff of the Philippine Army by President Quezon, while retaining his position as Director of the Bureau of Prisons. However, by May of that year, he was named Chief of Staff of the Army with the rank of major general.

Contemporaries have described Santos as having no tolerance for interference with his official authority and not afraid of anyone. Former Governor-General Francis Burton Harrison described him as "very conscientious and is fiery tempered about his work; he has no patience with political or personal promotion seekers. He is quick on the trigger about resigning if he meets a serious obstacle in administration–as he did with General Wood."

In 1937, President Quezon ordered him to combat the problem of Moro piracy in the south through the destruction of the pirates’ kotas, particularly Kota Dilausan, in Lanao. Later in December of that year, during his return from an inspection tour of army operations against Muslim outlaws entrenched in cottas near Camp Keithley in Marawi, the aircraft carrying General Santos, Colonel Fidel Segundo, and several other officers was reported missing after being forced to land amid typhoon conditions. After several days of search efforts, a U.S. Army aircraft located the party marooned on Anirong Island off the coast of Tayabas Province.

His term as Army chief of staff ended in December 1938, with Deputy Chief of Staff General Basilio Valdes replacing him.

== NLSA Administrator (1939–1944) ==
In January 1939, he was named general manager of the National Land Settlement Administration (NLSA). With orders from Quezon, he led the first group of 200 migrants from Luzon and the Visayas who transformed the primeval Lagao area in Koronadal Valley into a productive and progressive colony of six communities on February 27, 1939. Santos usually stayed with the men in the field, where he rallied them in their duties together with his personal aide, Eliodoro M. Pantua.

== Collaboration with the Japanese ==
During the Japanese occupation, the Japanese occupied the upper Koronadal and Allah valleys. Santos decided to cooperate with the Japanese to prevent further bloodshed. Santos and the Japanese commander agreed to "not molest or abuse civilians in all districts of Koronadal valley but with the condition that the people will cooperate and never commit any wrong move otherwise they will feel the repressive force of Japanese displeasure". He accepted to serve as manager of the Koronadal and Allah valley projects under Japanese orders. In 1943, he became Commissioner for Mindanao and Sulu.

In August 1944, he was called by President Jose P. Laurel to return to Manila. There, he was appointed as Commanding General of the Bureau of Constabulary. With Leyte and Mindoro being captured by the Americans, the Second Philippine Republic would retreat to Baguio, leaving Santos to take up residence in Malacañang.

In January 1945, he was tasked to survey Northern Luzon since the Americans started bombing the Philippines, arriving in Solano, Nueva Vizcaya. He not only supplied the people with food and water but also helped release prisoners. He also maintained communications with guerilla groups operating in the north. Col. Romulo Manriquez, commander of the 14th Infantry Regiment, would send missions to convince Santos to join and lead them, but the latter declined, desiring to prevent bloodshed threatened by Japanese soldiers against the people of Solano, Bayombong, and Bagabag should he escape.

== Capture and death ==
On June 6, 1944, Santos was ordered to be taken as a prisoner by Major General Kenshichi Masouka, head of the Kempeitai in the Philippines. Accompanied by Sgt. Juan Ablan, they would be forced to travel to the north, first to Bagabag, and then to Sitio Tamangan in the mountains of Kiangan, Ifugao, where the Japanese forces had retreated.

While being a prisoner, Santos fell ill to the point he could no longer walk around, mostly due to effects of inclement weather and food shortages. Even after the announcement of the surrender of Japan, General Masouka refused to allow Ablan to take Santos to an American hospital in Kiangan.

Finally, on August 29, 1945, Santos died of pneumonia at the age of 55.

== Legacy ==
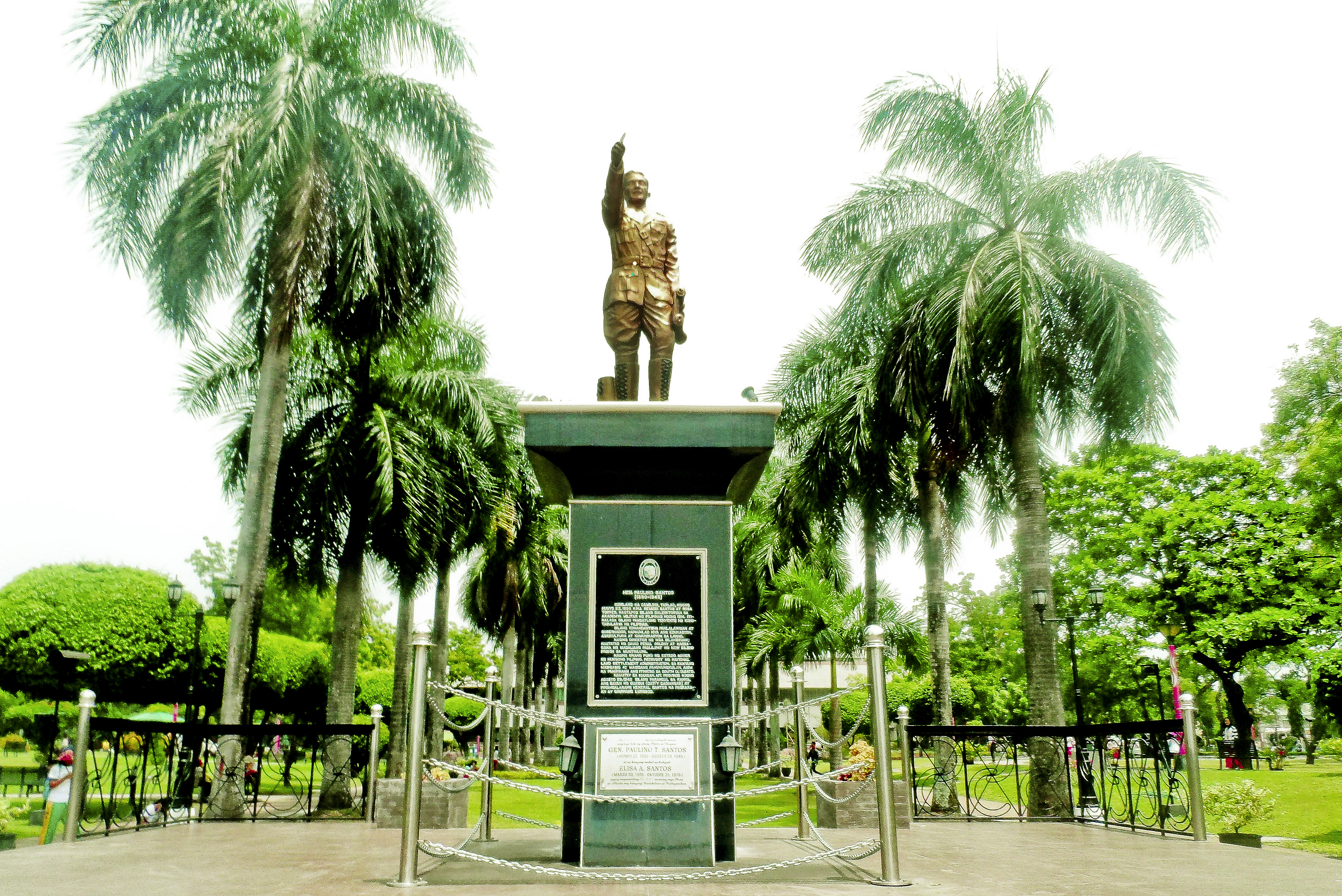
Monument of Gen. Paulino Santos in General Santos

As a tribute to his legacy in the area, the municipality of Buayan (formerly Dadiangas) was renamed General Santos in June 1954, which, by virtue of Republic Act No. 5412 signed on July 8, 1968, was declared a city. A grave and monument of Santos was unveiled in front of General Santos City Hall on September 5, 1981.

The Koronadal section of the South Cotabato-Sarangani Road was also named as "General Santos Drive", while the radial road leading to the New Bilibid Prison in Muntinlupa was also named as "Gen. Paulino Santos Avenue" as an honor for his service as a former director of the Bureau of Prisons. Taguig's main avenue, fronting Camp Bagong Diwa of the Philippine National Police, also a former Philippine Constabulary camp, the Hall of Justice, and the Department of Science and Technology, was also similarly named as "General Santos Avenue".

One of the urban Barangays of Koronadal is named after him using the initials of his rank and name, called as Barangay GPS.

As Chief of Staff of the Army, Santos pioneered the concept of Self Reliance Defense. Based on his experience of managing penal colonies, Santos intended to have all supplies for the new Commonwealth army made, if possible, in the Philippines. This would be supported by Commonwealth Act No. 138, which required preference for locally manufactured items in the procurement of supplies.

Military offices
Preceded by Guillermo B. Francisco	Chief Bureau of Constabulary; August 1944 – August 29, 1945	Succeeded by Frederico Oboza (Acting)
Preceded by Jose Delos Reyes	Chief of Staff Philippine Commonwealth Army; May 6, 1936 – December 31, 1938	Succeeded by Basilio J. Valdez
Preceded by Jose Delos Reyes	Assistant Chief Philippine Constabulary; May 6, 1930 – December 31, 1934	Succeeded by
Government offices
Preceded by new office	General Manager of the South Cotabato Settlements; 1939–1944	Succeeded by Albert Morrow
Preceded by	Governor of Lanao; 1938–1939	Succeeded by Ali Dimaporo
Preceded by	Provincial Treasurer Province of Lanao; 1938	Succeeded by
Preceded by	Director Bureau of Corrections; 1930 - 1936	Succeeded by
