= Rosa Santos Munda =

Filipina lawyer & educator (1918–2010)

- Born: Rosa Angeles Santos; October 1, 1918; Manila, Philippine Islands
- Died: March 29, 2010 (aged 91); Manila, Philippines
- Other name: Rosky Munda
- Education: Certified Public Accountant, Attorney
- Alma mater: University of the Philippines (LLB)
- Occupations: Attorney; educator
- Spouse: Amado Abalos Munda
- Parent(s): Gen. Paulino Santos (father); Eliza Angeles (mother)

Rosa Angeles Santos-Munda (October 1, 1918 – March 29, 2010) was a lawyer and educator. Her father was General Paulino Santos, the military leader for whom the city of General Santos was named after.

== Education and training ==
Munda was an alumna of the Philippine Women's University (PWU). She obtained her law degree from the University of the Philippines College of Law (cum laude) and completed her Master of Education in the same university. She was later a recipient of the UP Distinguished Alumna award in the field of education.

Her leadership training was at the East–West Center in Hawaii and she was an alternate delegate to the United Nations Commission on the Status of Women held in Geneva, Switzerland.

== Career ==
Before she became president of Philippine Women's University (then called Philippine Women's College) in 1980, Munda rose from the ranks starting as a classroom teacher in the 1950s then became school registrar, then Assistant Dean and Dean of the College. She got promoted to vice-president of the university in 1977, then executive vice-president in 1978. She became acting president in 1979 and then president in 1980. Munda served as president of PWU for 10 years before returning to Davao City. Once back in Davao, she served as the secretary of the PWU Alumnae Association in Mindanao. Together with PWU Executive Vice President Helena Z. Benitez, Munda worked to establish a chapter of the university in Mindanao, leading to the laying of the cornerstones of what would become the campus in Matina, Davao City. The Davao campus opened on June 8, 1953. it operates now as Philippine Women's College. She served as chairperson of the Board of Trustees of Philippine Women's College Davao until late in her life.

== Awards and Recognitions ==
She was a recipient of the Datu Bago Award, the highest recognition given to Davao City residents for their exemplary contribution to the city's growth and development. She was also named as one of the 12 outstanding women who received the 1979 Katuparan Award from the Federacion International de Abogadas (FIDA) for her efforts in education.

In recognition of her contributions to the growth and development of both the Philippine Women's University (PWU) and the Philippine Women's College (PWC) in Davao City, the RSM Events Center, a 2,000-seater convention facility was named in her honor.

== Civic life ==
Santos Munda was a Life Member of the Girl Scouts of the Philippines and remained active in the organization until the latter part of her life.
