= Filipinos in the French military =

In 1858, when the Philippines was part of the Spanish Empire, France and Spain invaded Vietnam. A number of French troops involved in the campaign became casualties as a result of contracting illnesses such as cholera, dysentery, tropical diseases, and rickets. In order to deal with the manpower shortage which resulted from this situation, the French consul in Manila, the capital of the Spanish Philippines, was given permission by the Spanish government to recruit nine hundred indios - Spanish term for someone from the Spanish East Indies - as Filipinos were then known, for the French navy and a sufficient number of men to form an infantry company and a cavalry squadron. It is said that one-third of the entire French force in this campaign consisted of mercenaries from the Philippines, who distinguished themselves in action and were well adapted to the environment.

There were twenty-three Filipino soldiers who served in the French Foreign Legion from 1914 through 1918. The legionaries from the Philippines, by that time an American colony, constituted the largest number of legionaries from the region which years later would be known as Southeast Asia. Other legionaries from the region who served in the Legion during World War I were: four Cambodians; two Dutch Hindus; ten Indo-Chinese; two Siamese; and four Tonkinese. Also during the European War, Dr. Basilio Valdes, a University of Santo Tomas graduate and a University of the Philippines instructor, served in the French medical corps. He was appointed Assistant Surgeon at the no. 101 temporary hospital at Avenue de la Republique in Paris, and worked at the Necker Hospital. The following awards which he received made him the most decorated Filipino of World War I: Croix d' Officier de la Légion d'honneur, Médaille de la Reconnaissance française, Médaille d'honneur, Médaille de la Grande Guerre, and Médaille de la Victoire. After the war, Valdes would serve in the Philippine Constabulary and later the Philippine Commonwealth Army and would become its chief of staff. He would also become defense secretary of the colony.

A small number of Filipinos presently serve in the French Foreign Legion.
