= Chief of the Philippine National Police =

Head of the police force of the Philippines

- Hepe ng Pambansang Pulisya ng Pilipinas
- PNP seal

- Flag of the PNP Chief

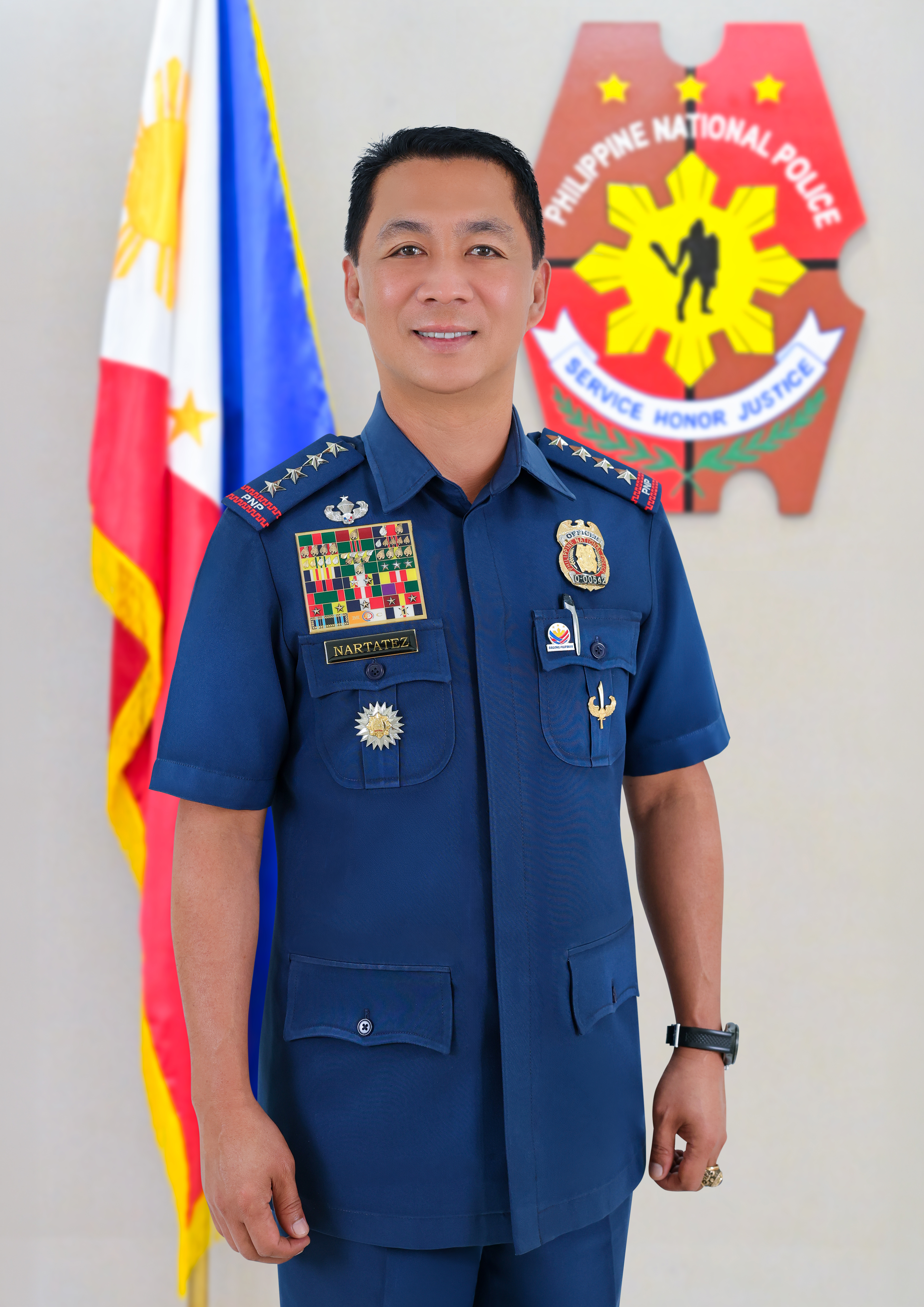
- Incumbent; PGen. Jose Melencio C. Nartatez Jr. since January 28, 2026
- Philippine National Police
- Abbreviation: C, PNP
- Residence: PNP White House
- Seat: Camp Crame, Quezon City, Metro Manila, Philippines
- Nominator: National Police Commission (NAPOLCOM)
- Appointer: President of the Philippines
- Term length: Shall serve a term of office not to exceed four (4) years; That in times of war or other national emergency declared by Congress, the President may extend such term of office; Compulsory retirement, shall be upon the attainment of age fifty-six (56).
- Constituting instrument: Republic Act No. 6975
- Precursor: Chief of the Philippine Constabulary (PC)
- Formation: March 31, 1991
- First holder: Cesar P. Nazareno
- Unofficial names: Director General / Police General (after the prerequisite rank)
- Deputy: Deputy Chief for Administration (TDCA); Deputy Chief for Operations (TDCO); Chief of Directorial Staff (TCDS)
- Salary: ₱157,274 monthly basic pay (2026)
- Website: https://pnp.gov.ph/

The chief of the Philippine National Police (abbreviated as C, PNP; Filipino: Hepe ng Pambansang Pulisya ng Pilipinas) is the head of the Philippines' national police body, the Philippine National Police (PNP). The position is invariably held by a police general, a four-star general police officer.

The chief of the Philippine National Police or PNP chief is also an ex officio member of the National Police Commission.

== Eligibility ==
The Department of the Interior and Local Government Act of 1990 (Republic Act No. 6975), the law establishing the Philippine National Police, states that the President shall appoint the Philippine National Police Chief from among a list prepared by the National Police Commission (NAPOLCOM) of "the most senior and qualified officers in the service" given that the prospect appointee has not yet retired or within six months from their compulsory retirement age. The lowest rank of a qualified appointee shall be the rank of Police Brigadier General. The appointment of the PNP chief by the President does not require confirmation from the Commission on Appointments.

== Powers and functions ==
The holder of the position of PNP Chief holds the rank of "Police General". Prior to February 2019, this rank was known as "Director General", According to Sec. 26 of RA 6975 the PNP Chief shall have:

Powers, Functions and term of Office of the PNP Chief

- Command and direction of the PNP; the power to direct and control tactical as well as strategic movements, deployment, placement, utilization of the PNP or any of its units and personnel, including its equipment, facilities and other resources. Such command and direction of the Chief of the PNP may be delegated to subordinate officials with the respect to the units under their respective commands, in accordance with the rules and regulation prescribed by the commission.
- Power to issue detailed implementing policies and instructions regarding personnel, funds, properties, records, correspondence and such other matters as may be necessary to effective carry out the functions, powers and duties of the agency.
- Issue disciplinary protocols on all member in matters. He may suspend, remove, and forfeit one's salary if found guilty of criminal, civil, and administrative case. The suspension, salary forfeiture and other actions may only be implemented against that member for not more than 180 days.

== Tenure ==
Under Republic Act No. 6975, the term of office of PNP Chief cannot exceed four years but he needs to retire immediately if he reaches the age of 56. An exception can be made by the President to extend the PNP chief's term "in times of war or other national emergency declared by Congress"

== Command Group ==
The PNP Chief is assisted by the Command Group. The current Deputy Chief for Administration is PLtGen. Wilson Joseph F. Lopez, the current Deputy Chief for Operations is PLtGen. Neri Vincent D. Ignacio, and the Chief for Directorial Staff is PMGen. Redrico A. Maranan (Acting).

== List ==
The following lists people who have assumed the position of Chief of the Philippine National Police. This includes people who served as Officer-in-Charge (OIC) of the PNP. This excludes OIC tenure due to temporary incapacitation of filing of a leave of absence of the incumbent – who would later resume fulfilling their duties.

No.	Rank	Image	Name	Term	Tenure length	Appointed by	Ref.
1st	Police Director General		Cesar P. Nazareno	March 31, 1991 – August 28, 1992	1 year, 150 days	Corazon Aquino	
2nd	Police Director General		Raul S. Imperial	August 28, 1992 – May 6, 1993	251 days	Fidel V. Ramos	
3rd	Police Director General		Umberto A. Rodriguez	May 6, 1993 – July 8, 1994	1 year, 63 days	Fidel V. Ramos	
4th	Police Director General		Recaredo A. Sarmiento II	July 8, 1994 – December 15, 1997	3 years, 160 days	Fidel V. Ramos	
5th	Police Director General (Note: Due to Santiago Aliño's unresolved retirement status, all of the succeeding PNP Chiefs (non-OIC) will only have rank of Police Deputy Director General (3-star rank).)		Santiago Aliño	December 15, 1997 – July 10, 1998	207 days	Fidel V. Ramos	
6th	Police Deputy Director General		Roberto Lastimoso	July 11, 1998 – June 15, 1999	339 days	Joseph Estrada	
7th	Police Deputy Director General		Edmundo Larroza	June 16 – November 16, 1999	153 days	Joseph Estrada	
8th	Police Director General (Note: Panfilo Lacson was holding the Deputy Director General rank until March 20, 2000.)		Panfilo "Ping" M. Lacson	November 16, 1999 – January 21, 2001	1 year, 66 days	Joseph Estrada	
	Police Deputy Director General (Note: Mendoza already seated as acting PNP chief from January 22, 2001. But due to Panfilo Lacson's age of retirement having not being reached after his resignation, Mendoza's rank is Deputy Director General until March 15, 2001.)		Leandro Mendoza	January 22, 2001 – March 16, 2001			
9th	Police Director General		Leandro Mendoza	March 16, 2001 – March 17, 2002	1 year, 1 day	Gloria Macapagal Arroyo	
10th	Police Director General		Hermogenes E. Ebdane Jr.	March 17, 2002 – August 23, 2004	2 years, 159 days	Gloria Macapagal Arroyo	
11th	Police Director General		Edgar Aglipay	August 23, 2004 – March 14, 2005	203 days	Gloria Macapagal Arroyo	
12th	Police Director General		Arturo Lomibao	March 14, 2005 – July 5, 2006	1 year, 113 days	Gloria Macapagal Arroyo	
13th	Police Director General		Oscar C. Calderon	July 5, 2006 – October 1, 2007	1 year, 88 days	Gloria Macapagal Arroyo	
14th	Police Director General		Avelino I. Razon Jr.	October 1, 2007 – September 27, 2008	362 days	Gloria Macapagal Arroyo	
15th	Police Director General		Jesus Ame Versoza	September 27, 2008 – September 14, 2010	1 year, 352 days	Gloria Macapagal Arroyo	
16th	Police Director General		Atty. Raul M. Bacalzo, Ph.D.	September 14, 2010 – September 9, 2011	360 days	Benigno Aquino III	
17th	Police Director General		Nicanor A. Bartolome	September 9, 2011 – December 17, 2012	1 year, 99 days	Benigno Aquino III	
18th	Police Director General		Alan LM Purisima	December 17, 2012 – February 5, 2015	2 years, 50 days	Benigno Aquino III	
19th	Police Deputy Director General		Leonardo A. Espina (OIC / Acting)	February 5 – July 16, 2015			
20th	Police Director General		Ricardo C. Marquez	July 16, 2015 – June 30, 2016	350 days	Benigno Aquino III	
21st	Police Director General		Ronald "Bato" Dela Rosa	July 1, 2016 – April 19, 2018	1 year, 292 days	Rodrigo Duterte	
22nd	Police General		Oscar David Albayalde	April 19, 2018 – October 14, 2019	1 year, 178 days	Rodrigo Duterte	
	Police Lieutenant General		Atty. Archie Francisco F. Gamboa	October 14, 2019 – January 20, 2020 (OIC)			
23rd	Police General		Atty. Archie Francisco F. Gamboa	January 20 – September 2, 2020	226 days	Rodrigo Duterte	
24th	Police General		Camilo Pancratius P. Cascolan	September 2 – November 10, 2020	69 days	Rodrigo Duterte	
25th	Police General		Debold M. Sinas	November 10, 2020 – May 8, 2021	179 days	Rodrigo Duterte	
26th	Police General		Guillermo Lorenzo T. Eleazar	May 8 – November 13, 2021	189 days	Rodrigo Duterte	
27th	Police General		Dionardo B. Carlos	November 13, 2021 – May 8, 2022	176 days	Rodrigo Duterte	
	Police Lieutenant General		Vicente D. Danao Jr. (OIC)	May 8 – August 1, 2022			
28th	Police General		Rodolfo S. Azurin Jr.	August 1, 2022 – April 24, 2023	266 days	Bongbong Marcos	
29th	Police General		Benjamin C. Acorda Jr.	April 24, 2023 – March 31, 2024	342 days	Bongbong Marcos	
	Police Lieutenant General		Emmanuel B. Peralta (OIC)	March 31 – April 1, 2024			
30th	Police General		Rommel Francisco Marbil	April 1, 2024 – June 2, 2025	1 year, 62 days	Bongbong Marcos	
31st	Police General		Nicolas D. Torre III	June 2, 2025 – August 25, 2025	84 days	Bongbong Marcos	
	Police Lieutenant General (Note: Nicolas Torre was only relieved as a chief on August 25, 2025 and he only retired on January 19, 2026.)		Jose Melencio C. Nartatez Jr.	August 26, 2025 - September 1, 2025 (OIC)			
	Police Lieutenant General		Jose Melencio C. Nartatez Jr.	September 1, 2025 - January 28, 2026 (Acting)			
32nd	Police General		Jose Melencio C. Nartatez Jr.	January 28, 2026 - Present	286 days	Bongbong Marcos	
