= National Counter-Terrorism Action Group =

Philippine intelligence agency

- Pambansang Lupon ng Pagsasagawa Laban sa Terorismo

Agency overview
- Formed: November 27, 2007
- Jurisdiction: Government of the Philippines
- Parent agency: Anti-Terrorism Council

The National Counter-Terrorism Action Group (NACTAG; Filipino: Pambansang Lupon ng Pagsasagawa Laban sa Terorismo) was formed on November 27, 2007, with its existence announced to the public on November 29, 2007. NACTAG is under the control of the Anti-Terrorism Council.

The NACTAG's existence was due to the passage of Republic Act No. 9372 of 2007.

== History ==
After its formation on November 27, 2007, and the announcement of its establishment on November 29, 2007, the Group was trained by the RP-UK Crisis Management Assistance Program, in cooperation with the British Embassy. The training programme was revealed to the public in January 2008. Former Philippine National Police chief, Arturo Lomibao, was appointed as the group's first chief officer.

The NACTAG held its first anti-terrorist exercises at the Light Railway Transit-2 station in Cubao and at the Metro Rail Transit North Avenue Station to prepare authorities for future terrorist attacks after a bombing was reported at Iligan City.

In November 2008, NACTAG supervised a raid in Taguig to arrest suspected Abu Sayyaf terrorists.

Lomibao kept his position in January 2009 when a cabinet shuffle took place. There was an accusation that Lomibao's appointment is a sign of cronyism from ex-President Gloria Macapagal Arroyo.

In September 2009, NACTAG was called upon to assist in investigating the use of pillbox explosives with the presence of US troops in Jolo, Sulu.

== Organization ==
NACTAG is responsible for overseeing anti-terrorist investigations by serving as the lead organization. It is a counter-terrorism body under the Anti-Terrorism Council.

NACTAG is under the direct command of the National Security Advisor.

=== Mandate ===
The mandate of the NACTAG is to be "involved in the actual investigation, in case of a terrorist attack, and in providing prosecutors with “enough evidence and witnesses so that the cases will stand in court in accordance with Republic Act (RA) 9372" or the Human Security Act."
