= Basilio Valdes =

Filipino general (1892–1970)

Major General Basilio Valdes
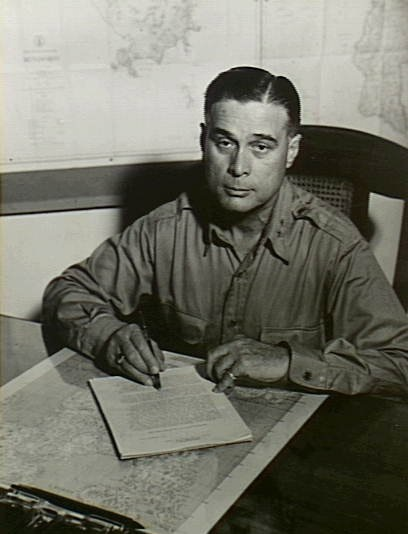
- Major General Basilio J. Valdes, Chief of Staff of the Philippine Army, 1944

Secretary of National Defense, Public Works, Communications and Labor (Note: Later known as Secretary of National Defense and Communications from August 1, 1944)
- In office December 23, 1941 – February 6, 1945
- President: Manuel L. Quezon (1941–1944); Sergio Osmeña (1944–1945)
- Preceded by: Jorge B. Vargas (Note: as Secretary of National Defense); León Guinto (Note: as Secretary of Labor); Sotero Baluyut (Note: as Secretary of Public Works and Communications)
- Succeeded by: Tomas Cabili (Note: as Secretary of National Defense and Communications); Jose Paez (Note: as Secretary of Public Works and Communications)

Secretary of Health and Public Welfare
- In office February 27, 1945 – April 1945
- President: Sergio Osmeña
- Preceded by: José Fabella
- Succeeded by: Jose Locsin

Chief of Staff of the Armed Forces of the Philippines
- In office January 1, 1939 – November 7, 1945
- President: Manuel L. Quezon (1938-1944); Sergio Osmeña (1944-1945)
- Preceded by: Paulino Santos
- Succeeded by: Rafael Jalandoni

Vice Chief of Staff, Philippine Army
- In office January 11, 1935 – December 28, 1938
- Preceded by: Paulino Santos
- Succeeded by: Vicente Lim

Deputy Chief of Staff, Philippine Army
- In office 1935–1936
- Preceded by: Paulino Santos
- Succeeded by: Rafael L. Garcia

Chief of the Philippine Constabulary
- In office 1934–1935
- Preceded by: BGen. Clarence H. Bowers
- Succeeded by: BGen. Guillermo B. Francisco

Personal details
- Born: Basilio José Segundo Pica Valdes; June 10, 1892 San Miguel, Manila, Captaincy General of the Philippines
- Died: January 26, 1970 (aged 77) Manila, Philippines
- Nickname: Basil

Military service
- Allegiance: (French Third Republic) France (1916–1917); United States (1917–1919) (Commonwealth of the Philippines) Philippines (1922–1945)
- Branch/service: Philippine Constabulary; Philippine Army
- Years of service: 1916–1945
- Rank: Major General
- Commands: Armed Forces of the Philippines
- Battles/wars: World War I World War II

Basilio José Segundo "Basil" Pica Valdes (July 10, 1892 – January 26, 1970) was a Filipino doctor, general and minister. Valdes was chief of staff of the Armed Forces of the Commonwealth of the Philippines from 1939, and was in 1941 appointed Secretary of National Defense by President Manuel L. Quezon. After the Japanese invasion of the Philippines at the beginning of the Second World War, he was one of the members of Quezon's war cabinet in exile.

== Early life and career ==
Basilio Valdes was born on July 10, 1892, in San Miguel, Manila, in the Captaincy General of the Philippines as the third child of a family of four. His parents were Filomena Pica, a Spanish woman, and Benito Salvador Valdés, a doctor and former classmate of José Rizal in Madrid. His mother later died in 1897 after giving birth to the couple's fifth son, after which the family led a wandering existence. Because of this, the young Valdes studied in many different schools. La Salle College, Barcelona (1897–1901); San Beda University, Manila (1901–1903); La Salle College, Hong Kong (1903–1904); the American School in Manila (1904); Pagsanjan High School (1905–1908); Manila High School (1908–1911); and on his father's intercession, he opted for a study of medicine at the Faculty of Medicine and Surgery, University of Santo Tomas (1911–1916) after completing his secondary school education. Valdes also became the founder of the UST Student Association in 1913, and became its first President.

== Volunteer to France ==
After graduating in 1916 he worked briefly as a lecturer at the University of the Philippines at the invitation of the University President Ignacio Villamor, but with the ongoing First World War he decided to leave the same year for France and joined the French Army as medical volunteer. He worked in the military hospital as a surgeon for the French Red Cross. With the American entry into the war in 1917, he transferred to the US Army (the Philippines being a US colony at the time) and continued to work until 1919. In February that year, he was appointed a member of the Military Inter-Allied Commission to Germany; made chief of the Medical Service of the American Red Cross Commission to Germany and later made deputy commissioner of the American Red Cross in Europe. In this position he made studies of health conditions in Prague, Czechoslovakia and Kovno, Lithuania. After the war he ran a clinic in Manila and married Rosario Roces Legarda, whom he adopted a daughter with.

== Military service and Secretary of Defense ==
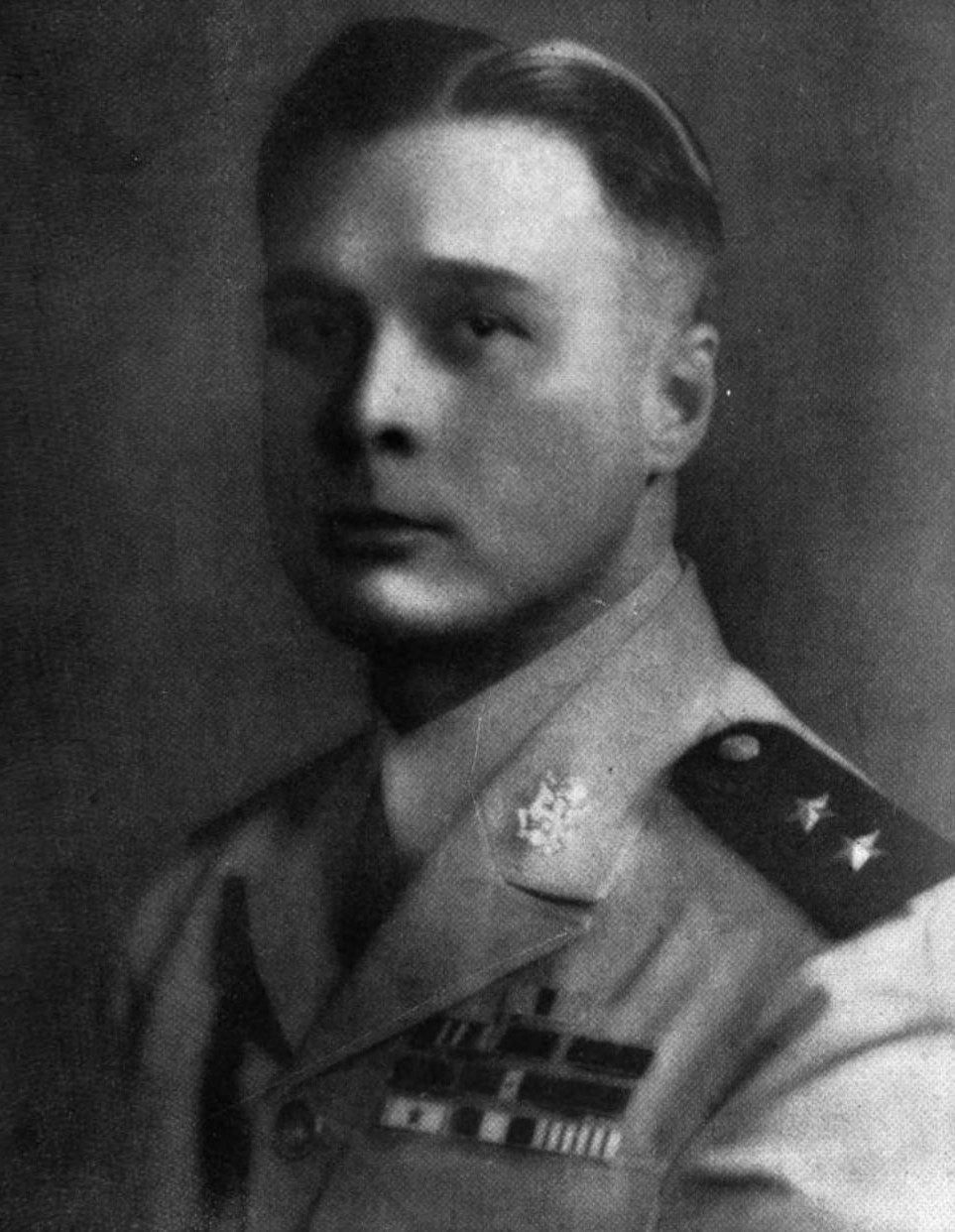
Photograph from The Commercial & Industrial Manual of the Philippines, 1941

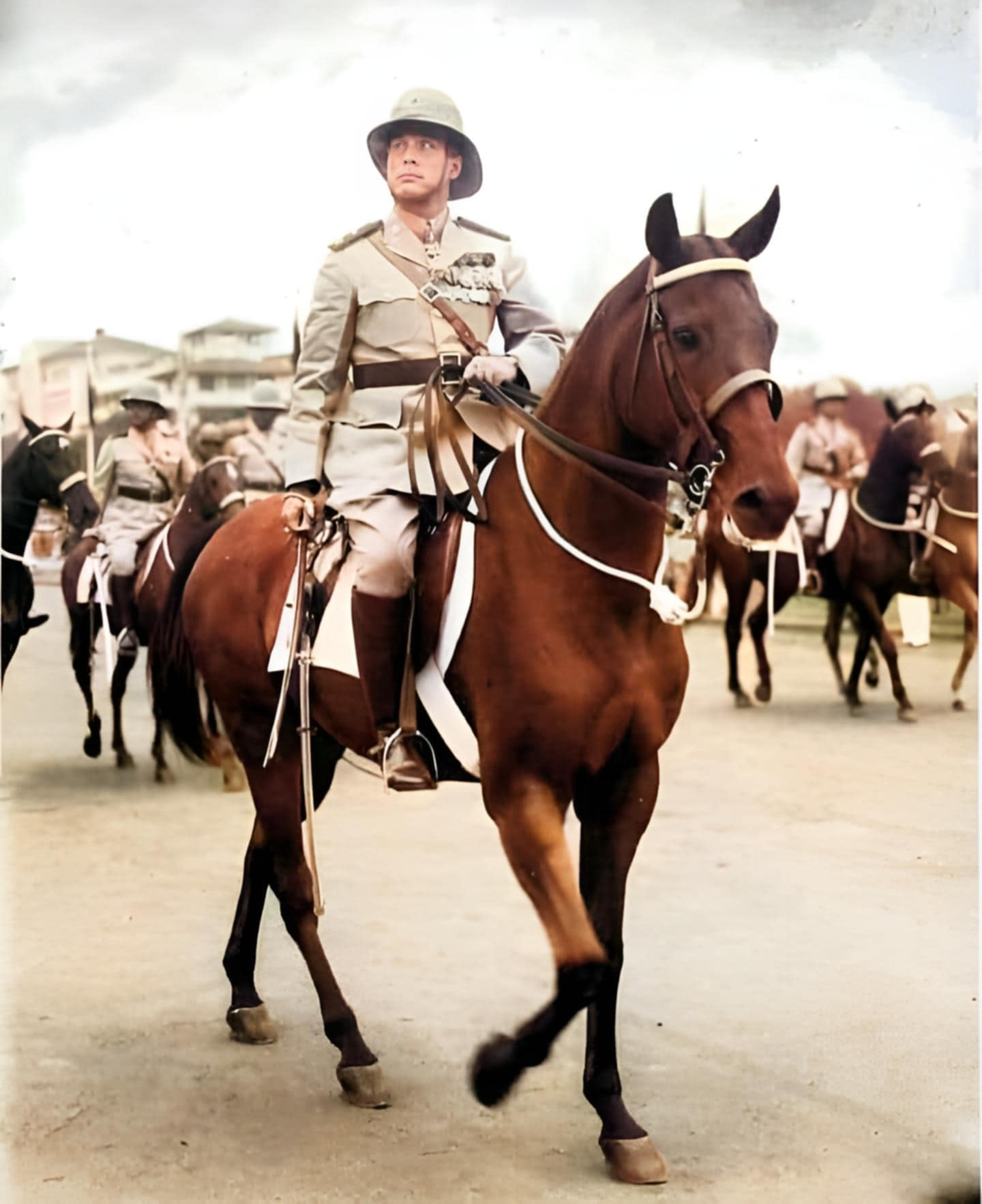
Major General Valdes, 1940.

In 1922 he was asked to join the Philippine Constabulary and revitalize their medical services; he joined and had by 1926 been promoted to lieutenant colonel and chief surgeon, serving as medical inspector from 1926 to 1934. Valdes became brigadier general and chief of the Constabulary in 1934. He later took his oath of office as Deputy Chief of Staff of the Philippine Army on May 4, 1936, and with the retirement of Chief of Staff General Paulino Santos, Valdes assumed this office by presidential appointment on January 1, 1939.

With the growing threat of Japanese expansion during the 1930s, President Manuel L. Quezon established the Department of National Defense in November 1939, which had executive authority over the army. With the attack on Pearl Harbor and Japanese invasion of the Philippines in December 1941, President Quezon merged the departments of National Defense, Public Works, Communications and Labor into a single department and appointed Valdes as secretary on December 23. As a member of the War Cabinet, he was tasked by General Douglas MacArthur to be in charge of the safety of President Quezon, who was very ill by that time, and his family. They were all evacuated to Corregidor, then Australia, and finally to the United States, creating the Commonwealth government-in-exile. After the death of Quezon on August 1, 1944, Valdes continued to serve in President Sergio Osmeña's government with the same positions as before. When American troops invaded the occupied Philippines in the Second Philippine Campaign, Valdes returned together with MacArthur and President Osmeña in the landing on Red Beach, Leyte on October 20, 1944.

Valdes reentered Manila on February 6, 1945, and was reunited with his family after three years of separation. Later the same month, the Commonwealth of the Philippines was reestablished and President Osmeña appointed Valdes as ad interim Secretary of Public Health and Welfare, officially taking the position on February 27, 1945. In this position he organized relief goods and medicine distributions from the U.S. Medical Corps to the war torn country. He retired from government service on July 4 the same year.

Valdes, along with the future Secretary of Foreign Affairs Raul Manglapus, at the time a reporter for the Philippines Free Press, were the only two Filipinos accredited to join MacArthur during the signing of the Instrument of Surrender on board the USS Missouri in Tokyo Bay on September 2, 1945. Valdes received one of 20 original facsimiles of the Instrument of Surrender, being one of eight personal guests of MacArthur, and his document is currently owned and curated by The International Museum of World War II in Natick, Massachusetts.

In January 1946 Valdes was appointed as one of the judges at the Military Tribunal of Japanese General Masaharu Homma in view of the war crimes committed by his command during the invasion of the Philippines, sitting on the bench along with Leo Donovan, Robert G. Gard, Arthur Trudeau, and Warren H. McNaught.

== Personal life ==
Valdes became the consort of Rosario "Bombona" Roces Legarda during the 1921 Manila Carnival Queen. They married on July 15, 1923 and settled in the San Miguel District of Manila. Valdes and Legarda adopted Rosario Tuason Matute, who was the half-sister of former First Gentleman Jose Miguel Arroyo. Valdes was an avid polo player, and was a member of the Los Tamaraos Polo Club in Parañaque.

== Later life and death ==
After the war Valdes went back to teaching as a professor of surgery at the University of Santo Tomas in Manila. He was head of the Philippine Cancer Society, vice-president of the Philippine Tuberculosis Society, chairman of the Deans Committee for the Veterans Memorial Medical Center and became the medical director of Our Lady of Lourdes Hospital from 1948 until his death. Basilio Valdes died on January 26, 1970, and was given a full military funeral.

== See also ==
- Manuel L. Quezon
- Philippines campaign (1941–1942)
- Philippines Campaign (1944–1945)
- Filipinos in the French military
