= Guillermo B. Francisco =

Filipino general

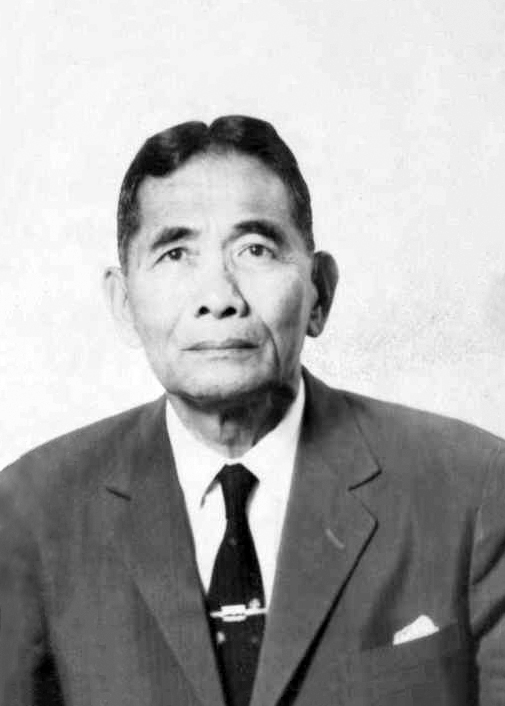
- Guillermo B. Francisco in 1962

Chairman of Philippine Veterans Board
- In office 1949–1951
- President: Elpidio Quirino
- Preceded by: BGen. Macario Peralta(Ret.)
- Succeeded by: Fr. Felanio Raymundo

Presidential Adviser on Police Affairs
- In office 1951–1953
- President: Manuel Roxas
- Preceded by: Position created
- Succeeded by: BGen. Alberto Ramos, PC

Chief of Philippine Constabulary
- Director, Bureau of Constabulary
- In office April 1943 – August 1944
- President: Jose P. Laurel
- Preceded by: Jose Delos Reyes
- Succeeded by: Paulino Santos
- In office 1938–1941
- President: Manuel L. Quezon
- Preceded by: Basilio Valdes
- Succeeded by: Federico Oboza

Deputy Chief of the Philippine Constabulary
- Deputy Director, Bureau of Constabulary
- In office November 1942 – April 1943
- President: Jose P. Laurel
- Preceded by: Jose Delos Reyes
- Succeeded by: Paulino Santos

Personal details
- Born: 10 February 1885 Manila, Captaincy General of the Philippines
- Died: 7 April 1976 (aged 91) Manila, Philippines
- Education: Philippine Constabulary Academy

Military service
- Branch/service: Philippine Constabulary; Philippine Army
- Years of service: 1908 - 1945
- Rank: Major General
- Unit: 1st Regular Division (PA); 2nd Infantry (PC) Division
- Commands: Bureau of Constabulary; 2nd Regular Division (Philippines); Philippine Constabulary; 1st Regular Division (Philippines); Constabulary District of Visayas
- Battles/wars: Moro Rebellion; World War I; World War II; Battle of Bataan

Guillermo Beato Francisco (10 February 1885 – 7 April 1976) was a Filipino military officer who served in the Philippine Constabulary and the Philippine Army. He was the Chief of Philippine Constabulary in 1938 until 1941. His constabularies were absorbed by the Army and he commanded the 2nd Regular Division (Philippines) during the invasion by Japan, and then survived the Bataan Death March. Paroled from prison, Francisco continued to be a constabulary leader during the Japanese occupation.

== Early life and education ==
Francisco was born and raised in Manila. He attended the Ateneo Municipal and received a bookkeeping diploma from the Liceo de Manila in 1907. Francisco was an honor graduate of the Constabulary School in December 1908.

== Military career ==
In August 1908, Francisco was commissioned as a third lieutenant in the Philippine Constabulary. After training, he served on Luzon until January 1927. Francisco was promoted to major in January 1922 and lieutenant colonel in March 1924.

From January 1927 to early 1936, Francisco served as constabulary commander in the District of Visayas. He was promoted to colonel in November 1927. After the reorganization of the Philippine military, Francisco became a brigadier general in the Philippine Army and served as the first commanding general of the 1st Regular Division from May 1936 to October 1938.

Francisco served as chief of the Philippine Constabulary from 1938 to 1941. After the constabulary was absorbed into the United States Army Forces in the Far East in 1941, he was given command of the 2nd Regular Division. After the Japanese invasion in December, he was promoted to major general. His division fought at Bataan and surrendered along with other United States forces in April 1942.

As a native Filipino, Francisco was imprisoned at the Capas Concentration Camp. Paroled to Manila, he was appointed first assistant director of the Bureau of Constabulary in November 1942 and director in April 1943. Francisco served as director until August 1944, when he was appointed chair of a new advisory board on Public Security.

After the war, Francisco was acquitted of treason charges. He served as technical adviser to Elpidio Quirino from 1946 until his military retirement in 1949.

== Later life ==
After his military retirement, Francisco worked as a real estate developer in Novaliches and Baguio. He died in Manila at age 91.

== See also ==
- List of Chief of Philippine Constabulary
- Philippine Constabulary
- 1st Infantry Division (Philippines)
- 2nd Infantry Division (Philippines)
