= Flaviano Olivares =

- Born: Flaviano Ponce Olivares; July 4, 1911; San Pedro, Laguna, Philippine Islands
- Died: December 23, 1997 (aged 86)
- Military career
- Allegiance: Philippines
- Branch: Philippine Army; Philippine Constabulary
- Service years: 1942-1945
- Rank: Brigadier general
- Conflicts: World War II
- Awards: Distinguished Service Star; Military Merit Medal

Flaviano Ponce Olivares (1911-1997) was a Philippine Brigadier general and a three-time recipient of Distinguished Service Star and a single Military Merit Medal. He graduated in 1936. Olivares was a Constabulary Zone Commander at Panama Canal Zone in 1961, followed by Deputy Chief of Staff of the Armed Forces of the Philippines two years later, and becoming a Commanding General for the 1st Infantry Division by 1964. In 1965 he became a chief in Philippine Constabulary. He died on December 23, 1997, after being diagnosed with aneurysm of the abdominal aorta at age 86.
