= Police ranks of the Philippines =

Structure of rank among police units in the Philippines

The following are the ranks of officials and officers of the Philippine National Police (PNP). These men and women report to the president of the Philippines as the commander-in-chief, through the secretary of the interior and local government, who is ex officio the chair of the National Police Commission, and the undersecretary for public safety under the Department of the Interior and Local Government.

== Current ranking classification (2019–present) ==
As of February 2019, a new ranking classification for the Philippine National Police was adopted, eliminating the confusion of old ranks. The enabling law for the ranking is Republic Act 11200 which was signed by President Rodrigo Duterte, amending Section 28 of the Department of the Interior and Local Government Act of 1990 that refers to the ranking classification of the Philippine National Police.

However, the usage of this classification internally by the PNP was put on hold in March 2019 during the creation of rules and regulations (IRR) of the rank classification, which determined how each rank would be officially abbreviated. The new rank abbreviations and the IRR of the new rank system officially took effect on March 25, 2019. These new ranks are equivalent to those of the Armed Forces of the Philippines. The rank system of the Philippine National Police is broadly aligned with that of the Armed Forces of the Philippines, facilitating coordination between civilian law enforcement and military institutions in areas such as national security, disaster response, and joint operations.

=== Full set of ranks ===
The National Police has no rank holders of Second Lieutenant, Technical Sergeant, Sergeant and Patrolman First Class.

| Insignia | Rank |
Commissioned officers
| | Police General (PGEN) |
| | Police Lieutenant General (PLTGEN) |
| | Police Major General (PMGEN) |
| | Police Brigadier General (PBGEN) |
| | Police Colonel (PCOL) |
| | Police Lieutenant Colonel (PLTCOL) |
| | Police Major (PMAJ) |
| | Police Captain (PCPT) |
| | Police Lieutenant (PLT) |
Non-Commissioned Officers
| | Police Executive Master Sergeant (PEMS) |
| | Police Chief Master Sergeant (PCMS) |
| | Police Senior Master Sergeant (PSMS) |
| | Police Master Sergeant (PMSg) |
| | Police Staff Sergeant (PSSg) |
| | Police Corporal (PCpl) |
| | Patrolman or Patrolwoman (Pat) |

== Historical classifications ==
=== 1991–2019 PNP classification ===
The Department of the Interior and Local Government Act of 1990 or Republic Act No. 6975 established the Philippine National Police under the Department of the Interior and Local Government, and later orders of the department formed the basis for the creation of a common rank system for the public security forces of the republic, which the National Police used for over two decades.

| Insignia | Rank | Equivalent rank (2019) |
|---|---|---|
| | Police Director General (PDGEN) | Police General (P/GEN) |
| | Police Deputy Director General (PDDGEN) | Police Lieutenant General (PLTGEN) |
| | Police Director (PDIR) | Police Major General (PMGEN) |
| | Police Chief Superintendent (PC/SUPT) | Police Brigadier General (PBGEN) |
| | Police Senior Superintendent (PS/SUPT) | Police Colonel (P/COL) |
| | Police Superintendent (PSUPT) | Police Lieutenant Colonel (PLTCOL) |
| | Police Chief Inspector (PC/INSP) | Police Major (P/MAJ) |
| | Police Senior Inspector (PS/INSP) | Police Captain (P/CAPT) |
| | Police Inspector (PINSP) | Police Lieutenant (P/LT) |
| | Senior Police Officer IV (SPO4) | Police Executive Master Sergeant (PEMS) |
| | Senior Police Officer III (SPO3) | Police Chief Master Sergeant (PCMS) |
| | Senior Police Officer II (SPO2) | Police Senior Master Sergeant (PSMS) |
| | Senior Police Officer I (SPO1) | Police Master Sergeant (PMSgt.) |
| | Police Officer III (PO3) | Police Staff Sergeant (PSSgt.) |
| | Police Officer II (PO2) | Police Corporal (PCpl.) |
| | Police Officer I (PO1) | Patrolman / Patrolwoman (Pat.) |

=== Ranks of the Philippine Constabulary ===
The Philippine Constabulary, which lasted between 1901 and 1991, was a gendarmerie police force which initially had its ranks and insignia modelled after the United States Army upon its foundation before switching to Philippine Army styling with branch-specific shoulder board and sleeve insignia.

==== Officers ====
Philippine Constabulary Rank (1950–1991)
General¹
Lieutenant General²
Major General
Brigadier General
Colonel
Lieutenant Colonel
Major
Captain
First Lieutenant
Second Lieutenant

¹ – Can be attained if a PC officer was appointed as Chief of Staff, AFP
² – Can be attained if a PC officer was appointed as Vice Chief of Staff, AFP

==== Enlisted constables and NCOs ====
- Master Sergeant
- Technical Sergeant
- Staff Sergeant
- Sergeant
- Constable 1st Class
- Constable 2nd Class
- Constable

=== Integrated National Police ===
The defunct Integrated National Police adopted a paramilitary-styled ranking classification based on Presidential Decree No. 1184 (the Integrated National Police Personnel Professionalization Law of 1977) issued by then-President Ferdinand Marcos as part of the joint command it shared with the PC, which began in 1975.

Rank
Police Brigadier General
Police Colonel
Police Lieutenant Colonel
Police Major
Police Captain
Police Lieutenant
Police Sergeant
Police Corporal
Patrolman First Class / Patrolwoman First Class
Patrolman / Patrolwoman

== Informal ranks ==
Prior to the adoption of the 2019 classification, the police informally used military ranks to address to each other; such as tiniente or lieutenant for officers who had recently graduated from the Philippine National Police Academy, while chief superintendents up to the director general were colloquially referred to as "generals".

== Pre-INP local police ranks ==
Prior to the reorganization of ranks in the police force in the Marcos era, local police forces (like then-Manila Police Department) uses American style police department ranks like Lieutenant, Captain, and Major. The police chief and deputy chief uses the American insignia used by colonels and lieutenant colonels respectively.

== See also ==
- Police rank
- Chief of the Philippine National Police, top position in the Philippine National Police, sometimes referred to as the "director general" after the prerequisite rank of the position.
