= Director general (police) =

Top police ranks

Director general is a senior rank in police forces used.

== Austria ==
In the Austrian Federal Police, the rank was the highest of the whole police force. The rank was officially called: Director general of public security (Generaldirektor für die öffentliche Sicherheit)

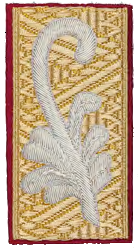
Austria

== Canada ==
=== Sûreté du Québec ===
In the hierarchy of Québec Provincial Police, the director general (Directeur general) is the highest, and above of Associate director (Directeur adjoint).

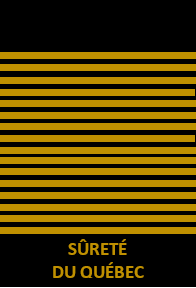
Canada

== Croatia ==
In Croatian police, the police director general (Ravnatelj policije) is the highest rank of the police hierarchy, and higher than deputy police director general (Zamjenik ravnatelja policije).

Croatia

== France ==
=== Police Nationale ===
In the National Police of France, the director general (Directeur général) is the highest-ranking officer.

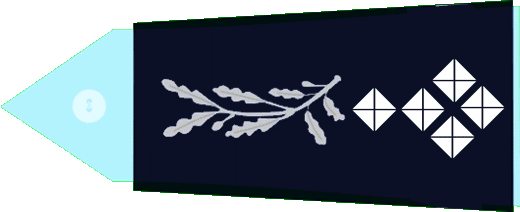
France

== India ==
The director general of police (DGP) is the highest rank in the Indian Police Service. Directors general head various state police forces, union territory police forces, central armed police forces, and central investigative and intelligence agencies in India.

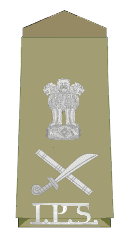

== Luxembourg ==
The director general (Directeur général) is the highest Luxembourg's Grand Ducal Police, and it is above (DGs) assistant director general (Directeur général adjoint).

== Philippines ==
In the Philippines, the Philippine National Police formerly used the rank as the highest rank, as defined in Republic Act 6975 or Department of Interior and Local Government Act. The rank is replaced by the rank of police general, but the director general rank was still used by the Bureau of Corrections.

Philippines

== Slovenia ==
Like in Croatian police, the director general of police (Generalni direktor policije) in the Slovenian police is the highest rank of the police hierarchy, and higher than Deputy director general of police (Namestnik generalnega direktorja policije).

Slovenia

== Turkey ==
The Turkish police have assigned director general (Emniyet Genel Müdürü) is the highest rank, and above of director first grade.

Turkey
