= List of Philippine Military Academy alumni =

This is a partial list of notable Philippine Military Academy alumni.

== List ==
- Silvino Gallardo, 1913, first Commandant, ROTC, University of the Philippines
- Paulino Santos, 1914 - AFP Chief of Staff (1936)
- Ruperto Kangleon, 1914, PA - 6th Secretary of National Defense; Senator
- Eulogio Balao, 1931 - Senator; 10th Secretary of National Defense; AFP Vice Chief of Staff
- Gen. Tirso G. Fajardo Education & Early Service • Graduated from the U.S. Military Academy at West Point in 1934. • Commissioned as 2nd Lieutenant in the Philippine Scouts upon return to the Philippines. • Assigned as an instructor in 1935 to assist the transition from Philippine Constabulary Academy to the Philippine Military Academy (PMA). • Sent to the United States in 1940 for advanced military training. World War II Service • Stranded in the U.S. after the outbreak of WWII in December 1941. • Attended the Command and General Staff College in Fort Leavenworth, Kansas. • Joined the 1st Filipino Infantry Battalion at Camp San Luis Obispo, California as Operations & Training Officer (S3); promoted to Captain. • When expanded into the 1st Filipino Infantry Regiment, retained as regimental S3 and promoted to Major. • Landed in Leyte with the 6th U.S. Army under General Douglas MacArthur in 1944. • Commanded a battalion and later became executive officer of the regiment under the 8th U.S. Army. Post-War Roles • Appointed Superintendent of the Philippine Military Academy (PMA) in 1947 at the rank of Lieutenant Colonel – the youngest to hold the post to date. • Oversaw the first post-war PMA class, which included Fortunato Abat, future Army Chief and Defense Secretary. • Retired early from the U.S. Army in 1949 and transferred to the Philippine Army. Philippine Army Service • Continued service at PMA under the Philippine Army. • Appointed Commander of IV Military Area (Northern Mindanao) in 1951; promoted to Colonel. • Commanded the 1st Infantry Division from October 1, 1957 to June 15, 1958. • Appointed Commanding General of the Philippine Army in 1958. • Retired in 1960 after 30 years of military service
- Pelagio A. Cruz, 1935 - AFP Chief of Staff
- Emilio S. Liwanag, 1935, PN
- Thawip Poonsiri Netniyom,,, 1981 Thailand Senator
- Francisco R. Adriano Sr., 1937 - Presidential Saber Awardee, Brigadier General
- Ernesto S. Mata, 1937, PA - 15th Secretary of Defense; AFP Chief of Staff (1963-1964)
- Alfredo E. Gallardo - 1937
- Manuel Yan, 1941 - youngest AFP Chief of Staff at age 48 years old and cabinet member for nine years
- Rafael Ileto, 1943 - 17th Secretary of National Defense; AFP Vice Chief of Staff; Ambassador to Iran (1975-1979)
- Fidel Ramos, 1951, (USMA '50) - 12th President of the Philippines; 18th Secretary of National Defense; AFP Chief of Staff; Chief of the Philippine Constabulary (1972 – February 25, 1986)
- Fortunato Abat, 1951 - 20th Secretary of National Defense; Commanding General of the Philippine Army
- Jose T. Almonte, 1956 - National Security Advisor (Philippines); Vice Chief of Staff for Civil Relations
- Renato De Villa, 1957 - PMA Commandant; AFP Chief of Staff; 19th Secretary of National Defense; Executive Secretary 2001 to 2005
- Eduardo Ermita, 1957 - AFP Vice Chief of Staff; AFP Deputy Chief of Staff; 22nd Secretary of National Defense
- Marcelo Blando, 1960
- Rodolfo Biazon, 1961 - Senator; AFP Chief of Staff; AFP Vice Chief of Staff; Commandant of the Philippine Marines; Superintendent, PMA; CG, NCRDC
- Angelo Reyes, 1966, PA - Secretary DOE, DENR, DILG, Ambassador at Large; Chief of Staff, AFP; CG Philippine Army; CG, Southcom; 23rd Secretary of National Defense
- Jewel F. Canson, 1968 - National Drug Law Enforcement and Prevention Coordinating Center Chief 2001;
- Voltaire Gazmin, 1968 - 35th Secretary of National Defense (2010-2016); Philippine Ambassador to Cambodia (2002-2004); Commanding General of the Philippine Army; Commander of Presidential Security Group (1986-1992)
- Reynaldo Wycoco, 1968 - National Bureau of Investigation Director (2001-2005)
- Proceso L. Maligalig, 1969, PN - President, Bataan Shipyard and Engineering Company (BASECO); President Emeritus, Rebolusyonaryong Alyansang Makabansa (RAM)
- Jaime de los Santos, 1969 PA - CG Philippine Army (2001-2002)
- Hermogenes E. Ebdane, Jr., 1970 - PNP Chief, National Security Advisor, 30th Secretary of National Defense, Secretary of Public Works & Highways
- Gregorio Honasan, 1971 - Senator
- Panfilo Lacson, 1971 - PDGen PNP, Senator
- Edgar Aglipay, 1971 - NCRPO commander for two terms, PNP chief
- Ariston Delos Reyes, 1971 - AFP Vice Chief of Staff; AFP Deputy Chief of Staff; Vice Commander, PN; Deputy Chief of Staff for Plans, J5, GHQ; Chief of Naval Staff, Headquarters, PN
- Edilberto Adan, 1972
- Victor Batac, 1971 - PNP Director of Logistics
- Rodolfo Aguinaldo, 1972, PA - Congressman of the 6th District of Cagayan, Governor of Cagayan
- Emmanuel R. Teodosio, 1972 - AFP Centcom Commander, PN(M)
- Ernesto H. De Leon, 1972 - AFP - FOIC, PN; Philippine Ambassador to Australia
- Delfin Lorenzana, 1973, PA - Secretary of the Department of National Defense
- Cardozo M. Luna, 1975 - Undersecretary of Department of National Defense; former Philippine Ambassador to the Netherlands; former Vice Chief of Staff and Lieutenant General of the Armed Forces of the Philippines
- Noe Wong, 1975, PNP - Ambassador to Cambodia
- Leopoldo N. Bataoil, 1976, PNP - Congressman of Pangasinan's 2nd district (since 2010)
- Rodrigo F. Maclang, 1976 - AFP Deputy Chief of Staff
- Alexander B. Yano, 1976, PA - 38th AFP Chief of Staff; 49th CG Philippine Army (2007-2008)
- Leopoldo L. Maligalig, 1976, PA - Superintendent, Philippine Military Academy; First Philippine Holdings, Lopez Group
- Ricardo David, 1977, PA - AFP Chief of Staff
- Nestor Ochoa, 1977, PA - Philippine Ambassador to Brunei
- Delfin Bangit, 1978, PA - AFP Chief of Staff
- Arturo Ortiz, 1979, PA - Medal of Valor Awardee; 53rd CG Philippine Army (since 2010)
- Ariel Q. Querubin, 1979, PMC - Medal of Valor Awardee; CG 1st Marine Brigade
- Natalio C. Ecarma III, - 1981, Undersecretary of National Defense for Defense Operations. 1st Filipino Head of Mission and Force Commander of a United Nations Peacekeeping Force; Force Recon Marines
- Benjamin Magalong, 1982 PNP, Mayor of Baguio
- Donato B. San Juan II, 1984, PA - Superintendent, Philippine Military Academy; Former Deputy Commissioner, Bureau of Customs
- Rey Leonardo Guerrero, 1984, PA - 49th Chief of Staff of the Armed Forces of the Philippines; Commissioner, Bureau of Customs
- Salvador Melchor B. Mison Jr, 1984, PAF - Vice Chief of Staff, Armed Forces of the Philippines
- Carlito Galvez Jr., 1985, PA - 50th Chief of Staff of the Armed Forces of the Philippines; Secretary, Office of the Presidential Adviser on the Peace Process (OPAPP); Chief Implementer, National Task Force Against COVID-19
- Gilbert I. Gapay, 1986, PA - 55th Chairman of the Joint Chiefs
- Ronald dela Rosa, 1986 - 19th Chief of the Philippine National Police, Senator
- Oscar David Albayalde, 1986 - 20th Chief of the Philippine National Police
- Cirilito E. Sobejana, PA, 1987 - Medal of Valor Awardee, 56th Chairman of the Joint Chiefs
- Debold Sinas, 1987 - 23rd Chief of the Philippine National Police
- Guillermo Eleazar, 1987 - 24th Chief of the Philippine National Police
- Romeo Brawner Jr., 1989 PA - 60th Chief of Staff of the Armed Forces of the Philippines, 64th Commanding General of the Philippine Army
- Eric Noble, 1992 PNP, Director of Directorate of Investigation and Detective Management
- Raul Tupas, 1994 PA - former representative
- Antonio Trillanes, 1995, Spokesperson of the Magdalo Group, Senator
- Herbert Dilag, 1998 PA - Medal of Valor Awardee

== Notable Philippine Military Academy classes ==
Several Philippine Military Academy classes have achieved notability, either due to highly decorated class members, significant changes in the PMA curriculum, or due to a high proportion of officers elevated to the highest ranks of the Armed Forces of the Philippines or the Philippine National Police.

These include:

"Magiting" Class of 1970 - the first class with a recorded formal name; included Chief of the Philippine National Police, Secretary of Public Works and Highways, Secretary of National Defense and Zambales Gov. Hermogenes Ebdane Jr., former Armed Forces of the Philippines Chief of Staff Dionisio Santiago, former Armed Forces of the Philippines Chief of Staff Roy Cimatu.

"Matatag" Class of 1971 - best known for being the core group of the Reform the Armed Forces Movement (RAM); included Senators Gregorio Honasan and Panfilo Lacson; also included former Maj. Gen. Carlos Garcia, who was later implicated in a military fund scandal.

"Dimalupig" Class of 1981 - well known as having many "mistahs" appointed to high ranks during the term of President Benigno Aquino III, including four who achieved four-star rank: AFP chief General Gregorio Catapang Jr; PNP chief Director General Alan Purisima; AFP chief General Emmanuel Bautista; and Thai officer Thawip Poonsiri Netniyom, who was valedictorian and became General of the Royal Thai Armed Forces.

"Sinagtala" Class of 1986 - known for being the first class to graduate from the PMA after the restoration of Philippine democracy in 1986, and the first batch of new military officers to serve the administration of President Corazon Aquino; also known for having many "mistahs" appointed to high ranks during the term of President Rodrigo Duterte, including most of the heads of the PNP: Ronald dela Rosa, Oscar Albayalde, Francisco Gamboa, and Camilo Cascolan.

"Maalab" Class of 1993 - known for being the class of ensign Philip Pestaño, who died from a gunshot wound under disputed circumstances; was also the last PMA class to graduate before the inclusion of women, later in the same year.

"Kalasag-lahi" Class of 1997 - known for being the class that saw the graduation of PMA's first batch of women graduates

"Marilag" Class of 1995 - known for being the class of many of the Magdalo Group during the Oakwood mutiny, including Antonio Trillanes but also Makati Police Chief PSSupt. Rogelio Simon, who served Trillanes' warrant of arrest in 2018. It is notable academically as the class who were first to undergo the new tri-service curriculum of PMA, effectively becoming PMA's first batch of service specialists upon graduation.

== Gallery ==
Notable people

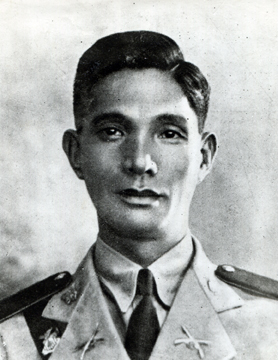
Paulino Santos

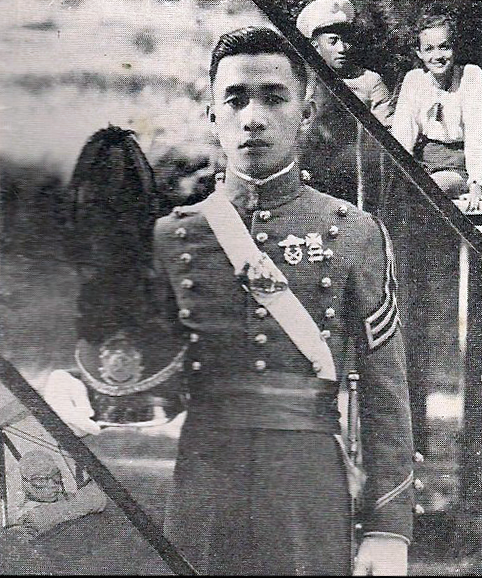
Ramon A. Alcaraz

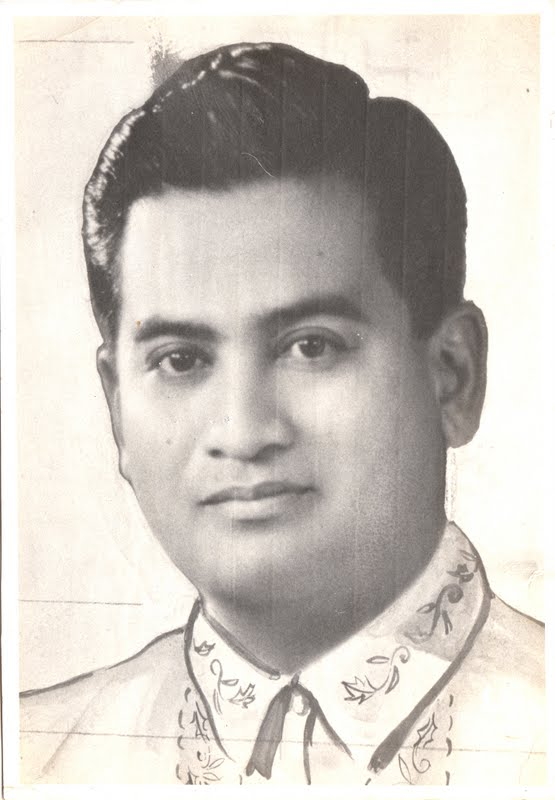
Jose Concepcion Maristela Sr.

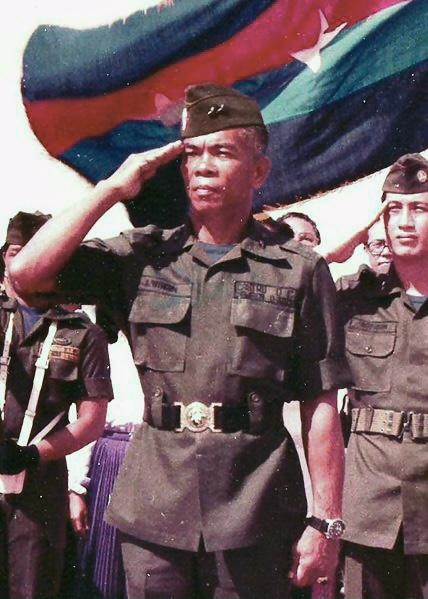
Delfin Castro

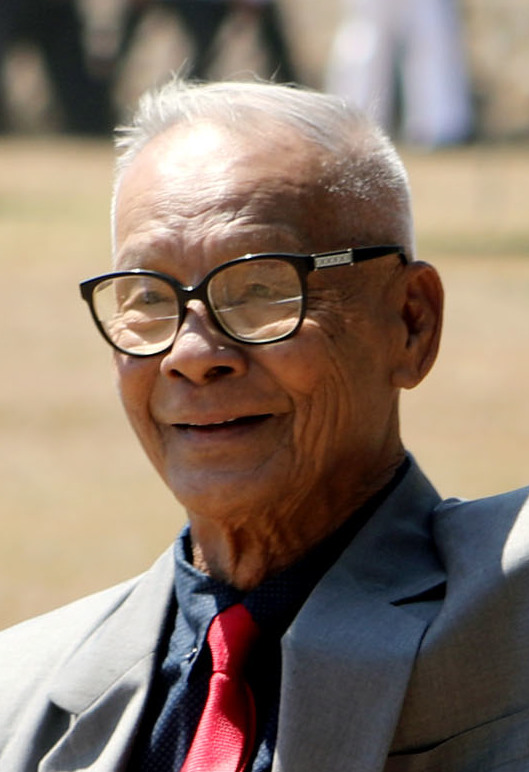
Rodolfo Biazon

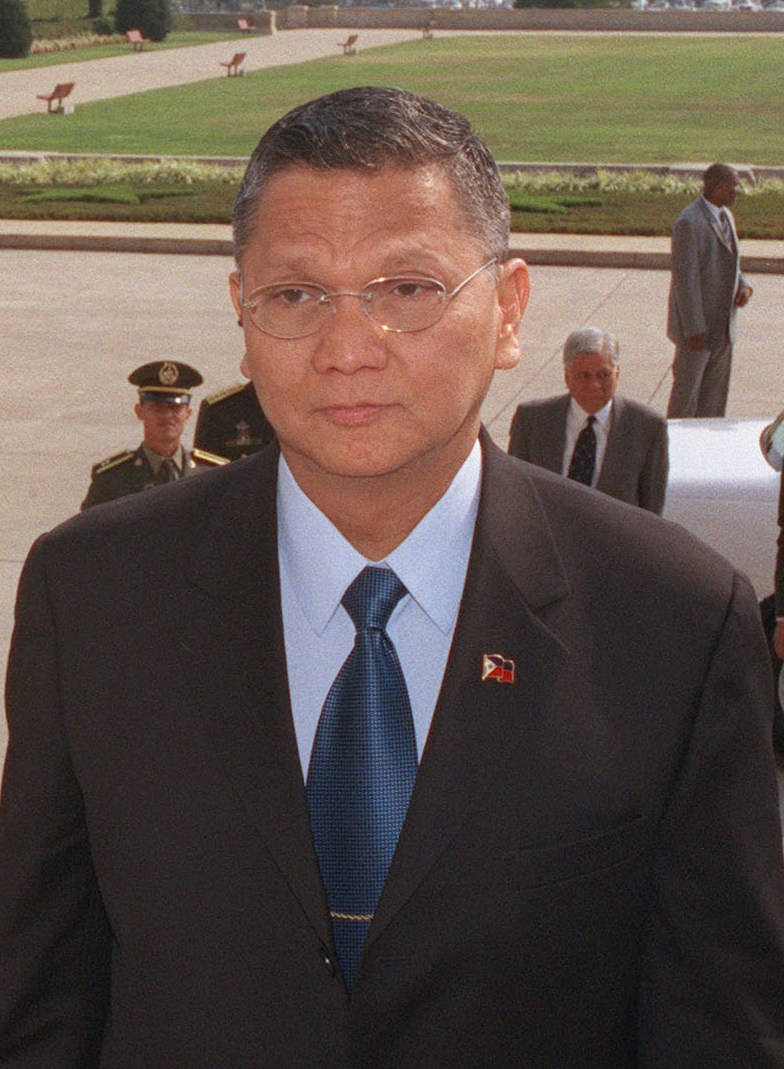
Angelo Reyes

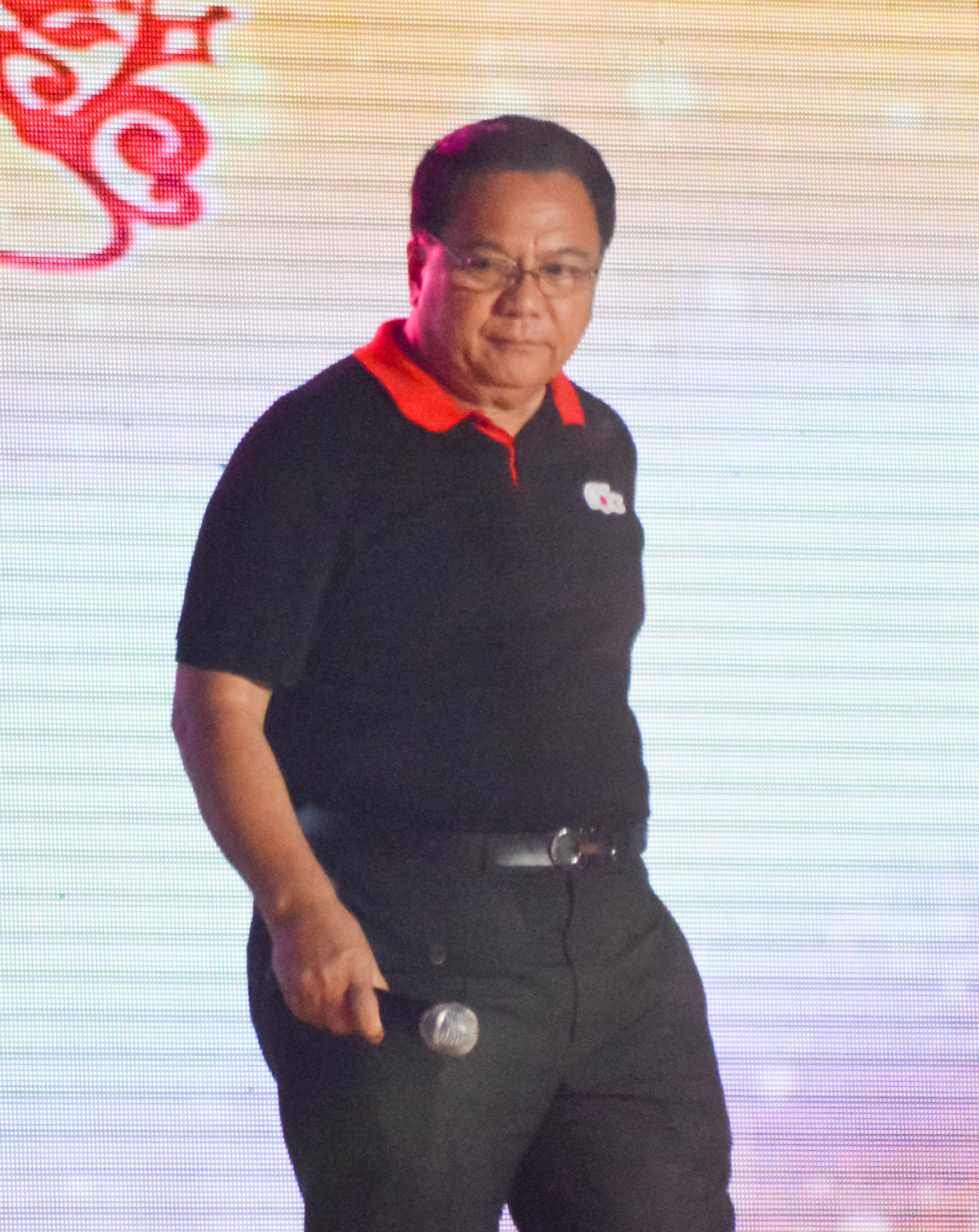
Hermogenes Ebdane

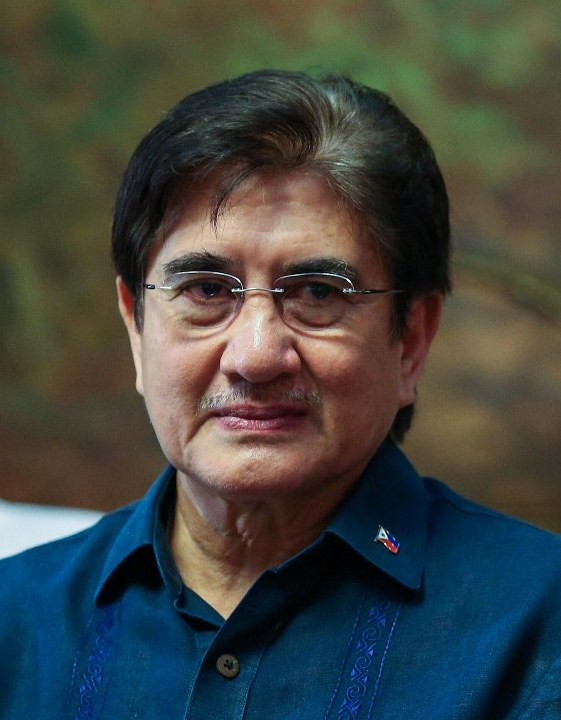
Gregorio Honasan

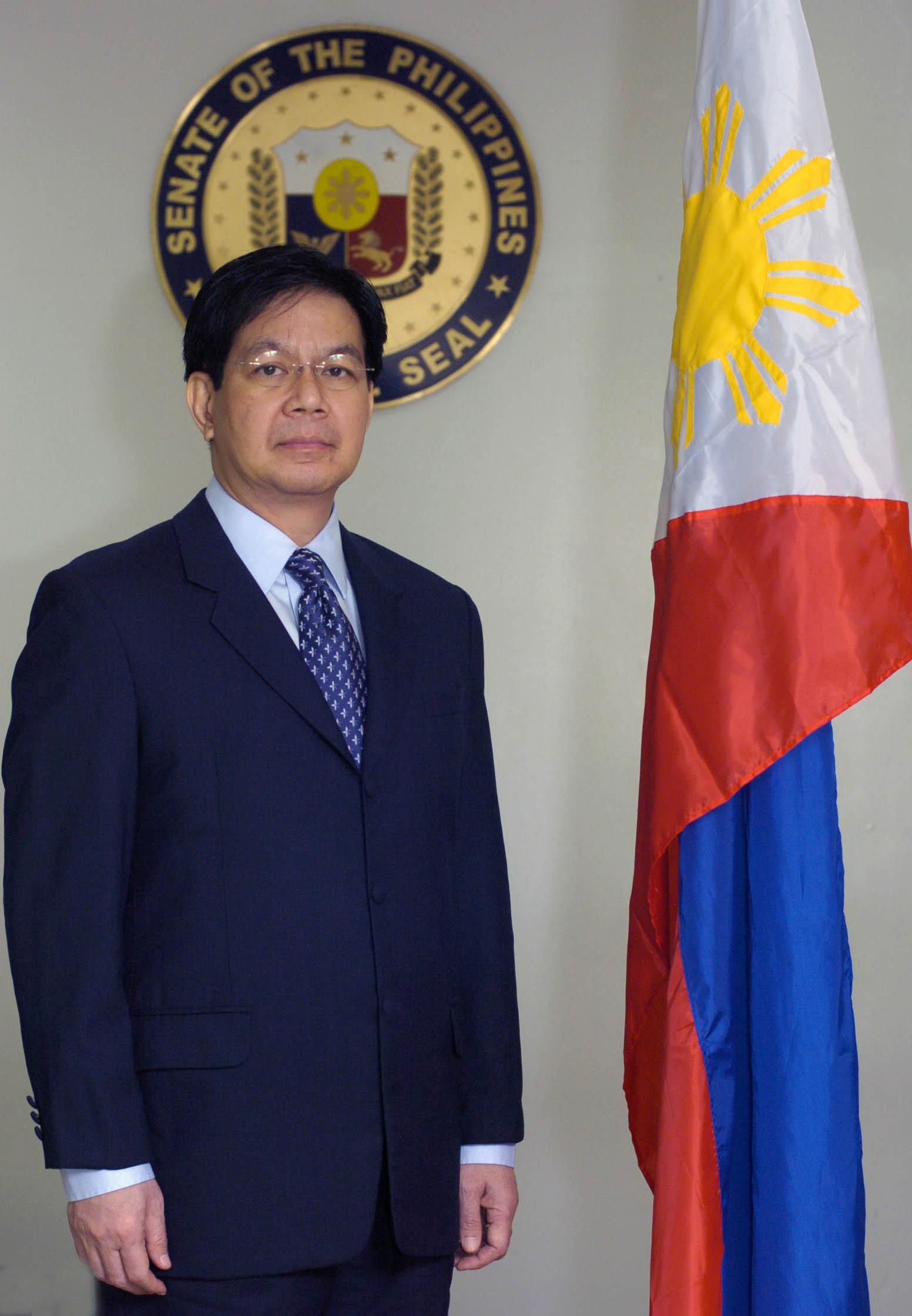
Panfilo Lacson

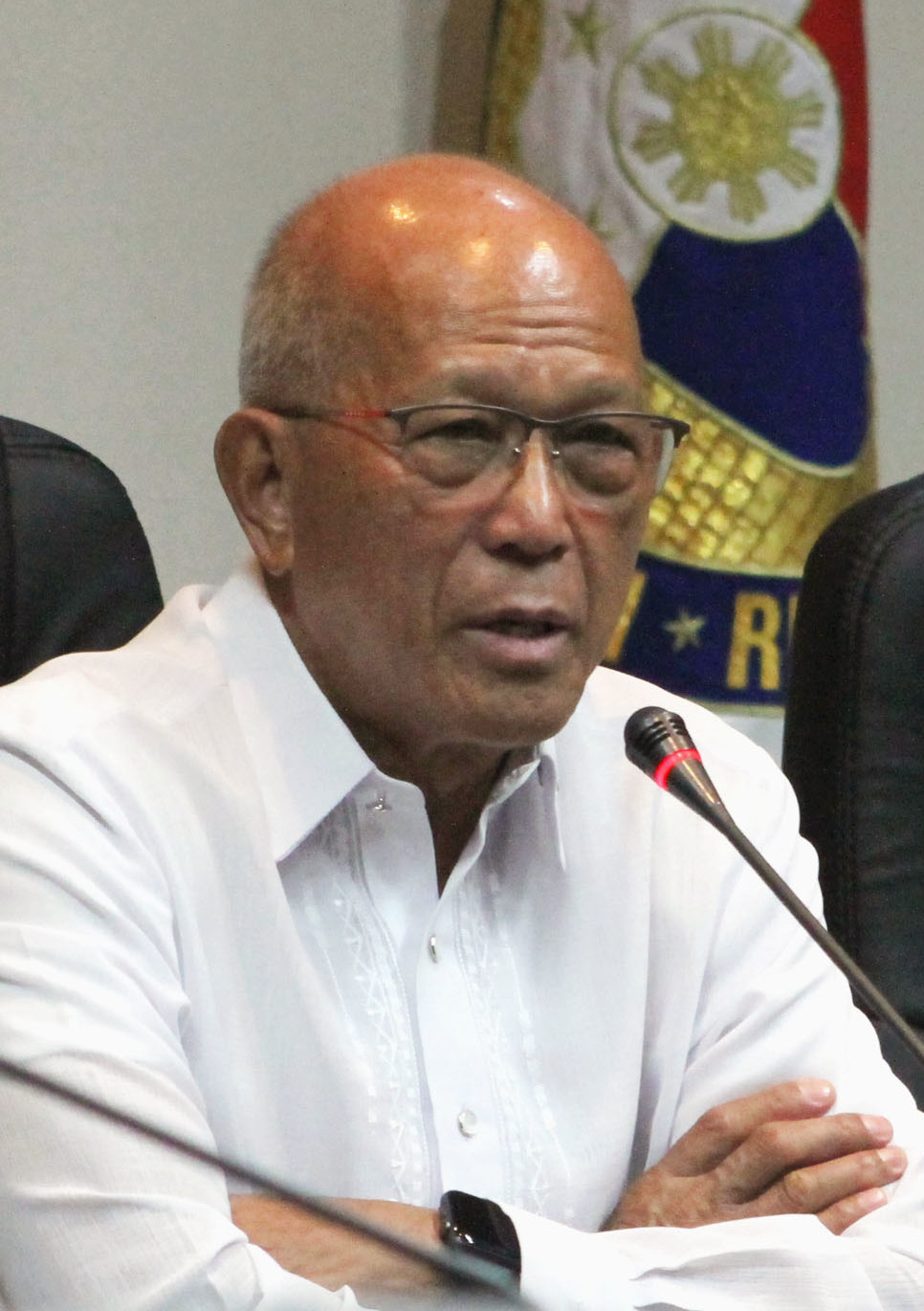
Delfin Lorenzana

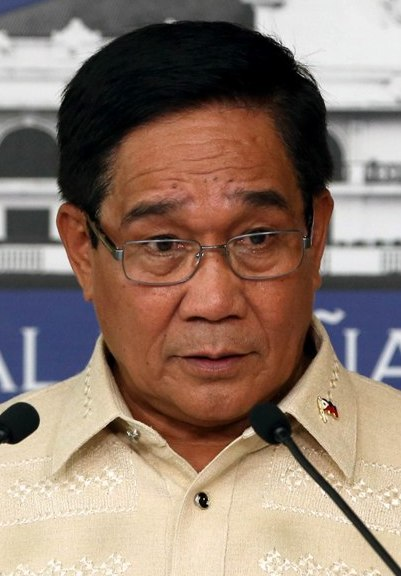
Hermogenes Esperon

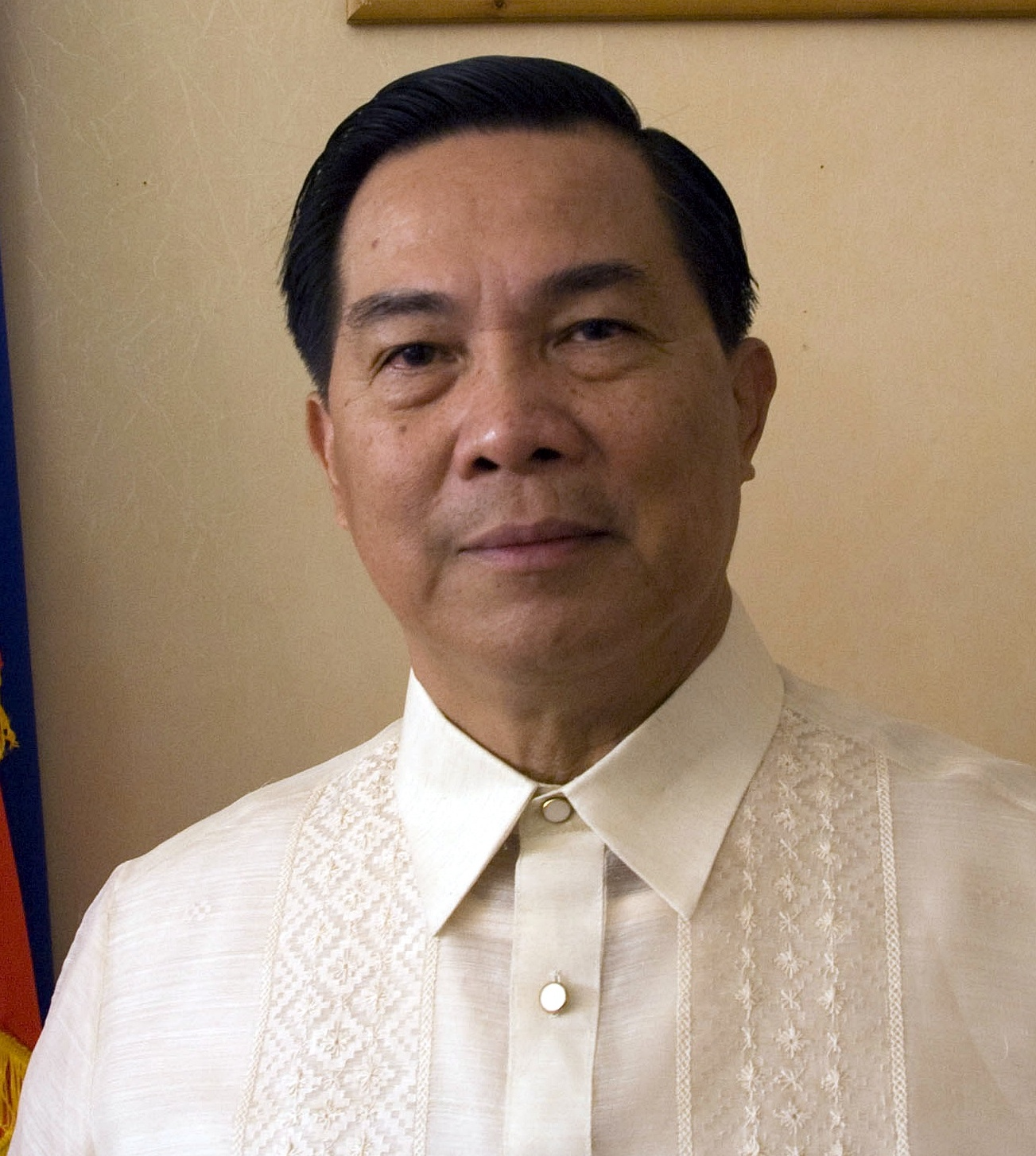
Cardozo Luna

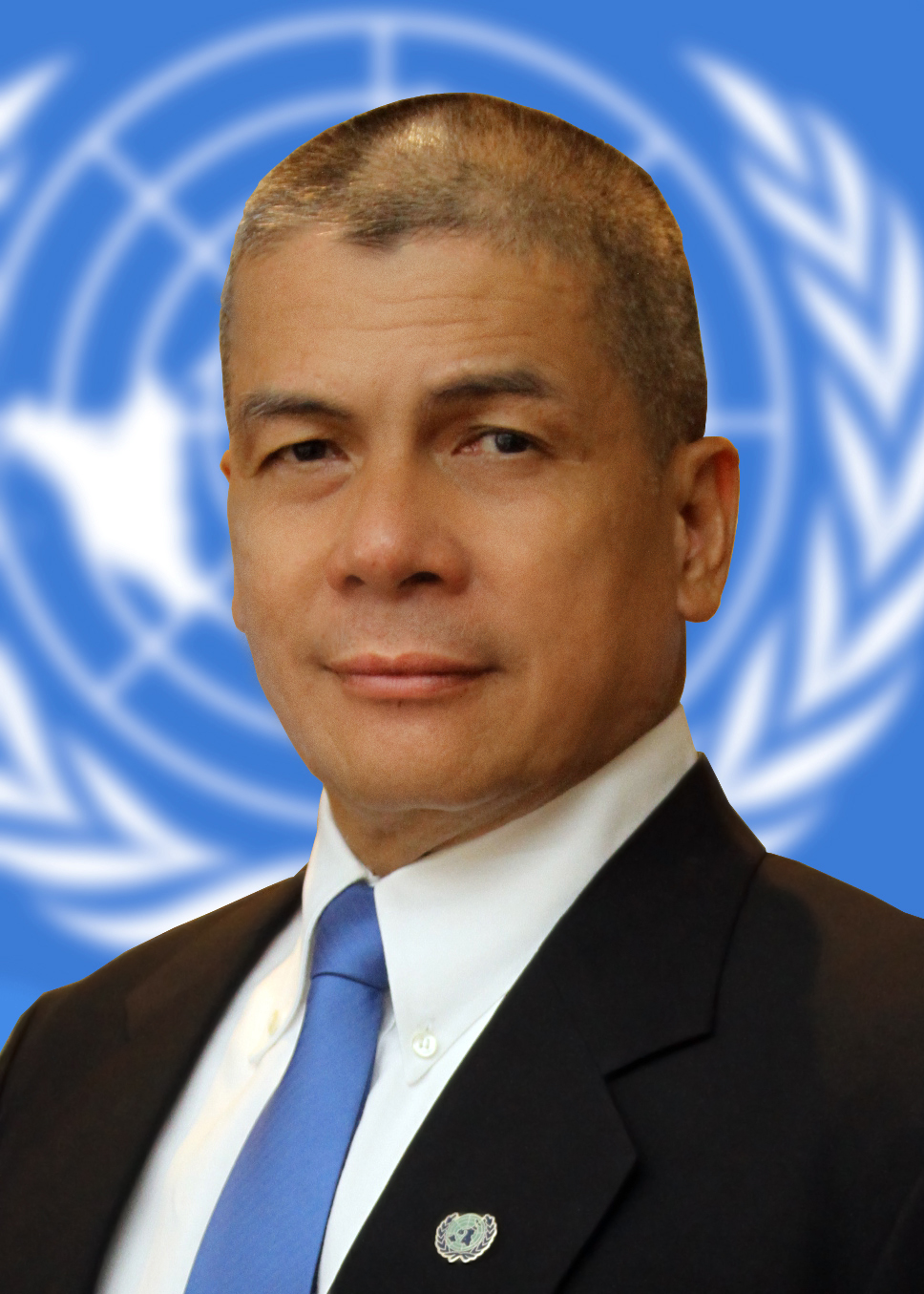
Natalio Ecarma III

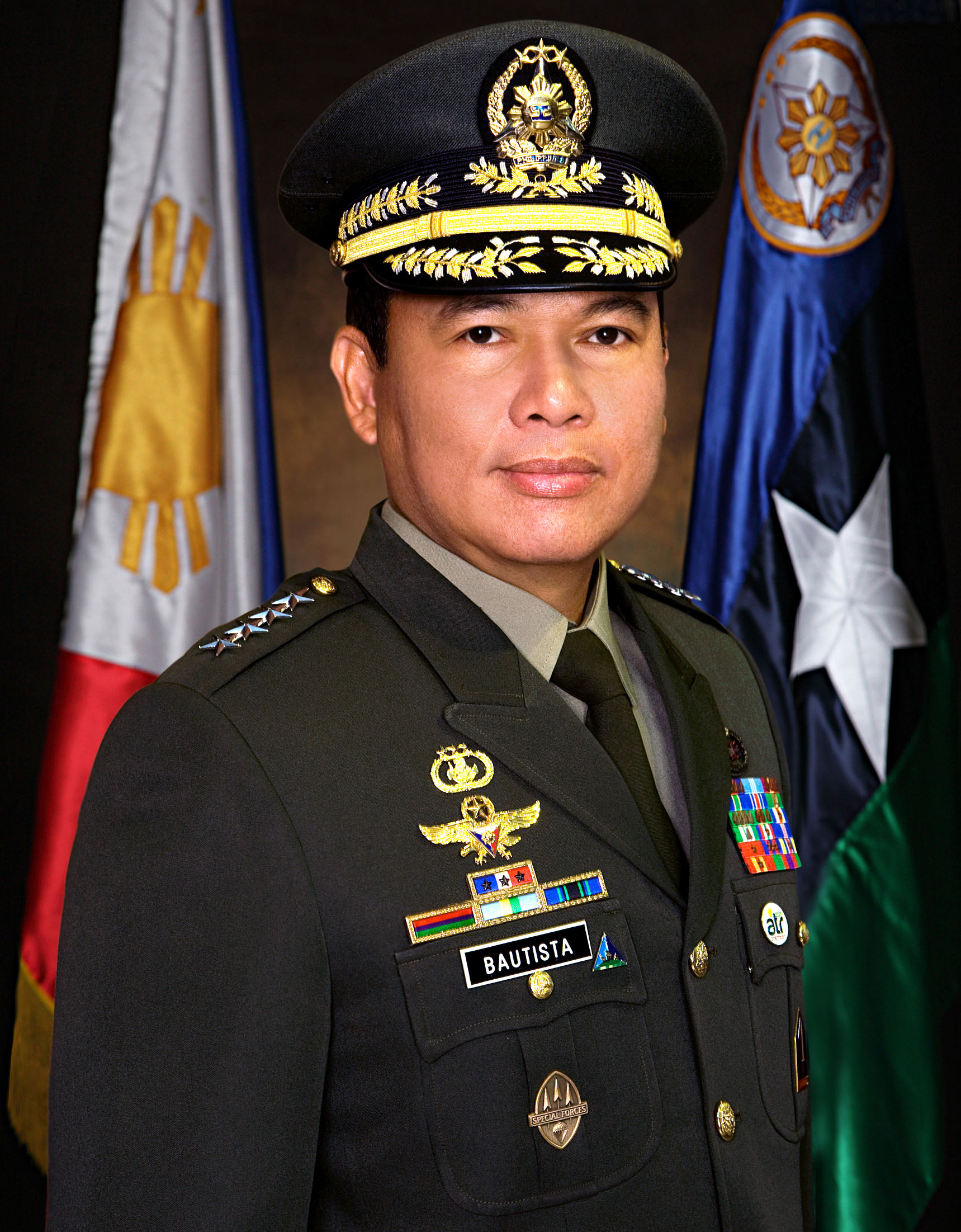
Emmanuel Bautista

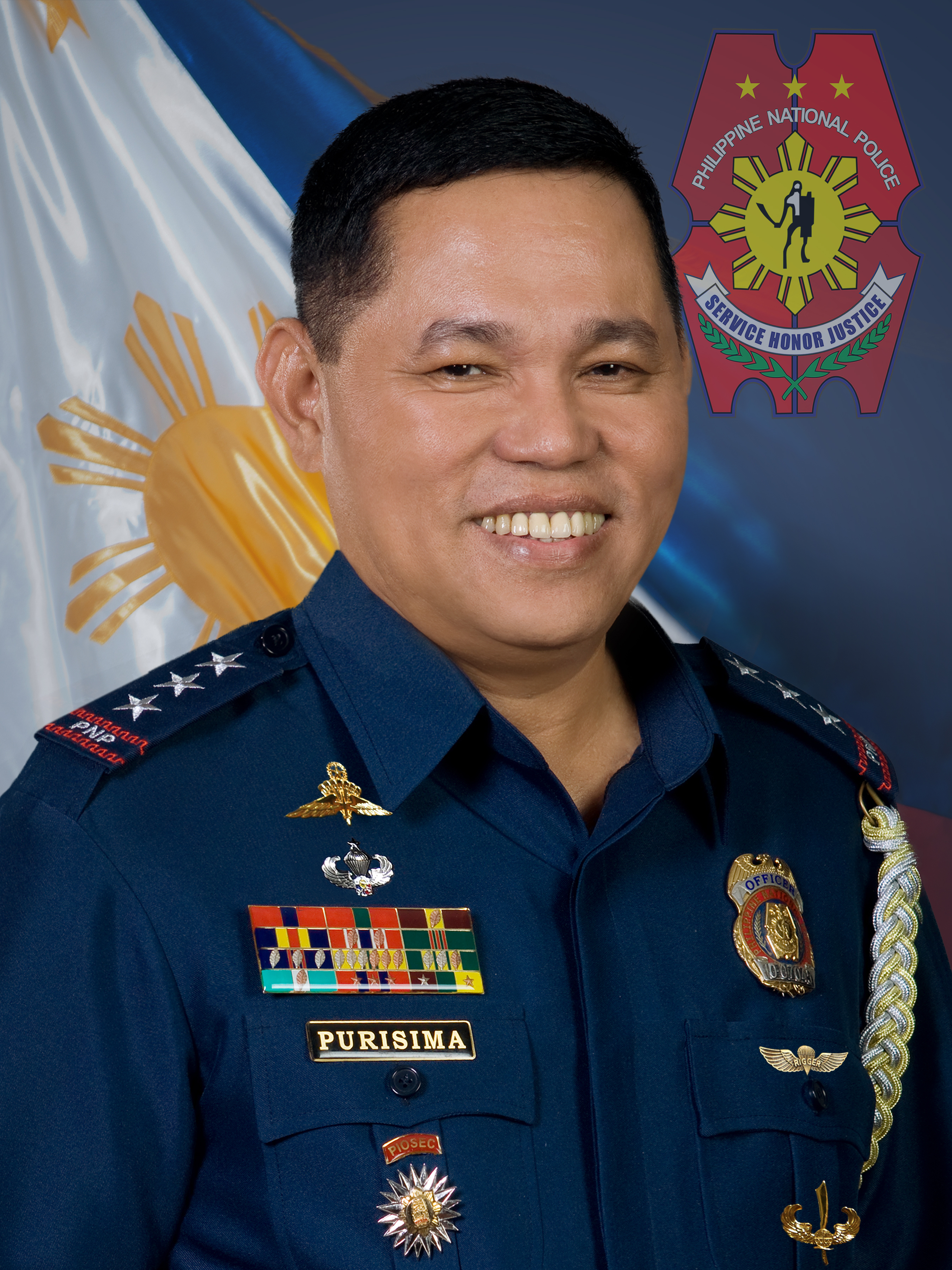
Alan Purisima

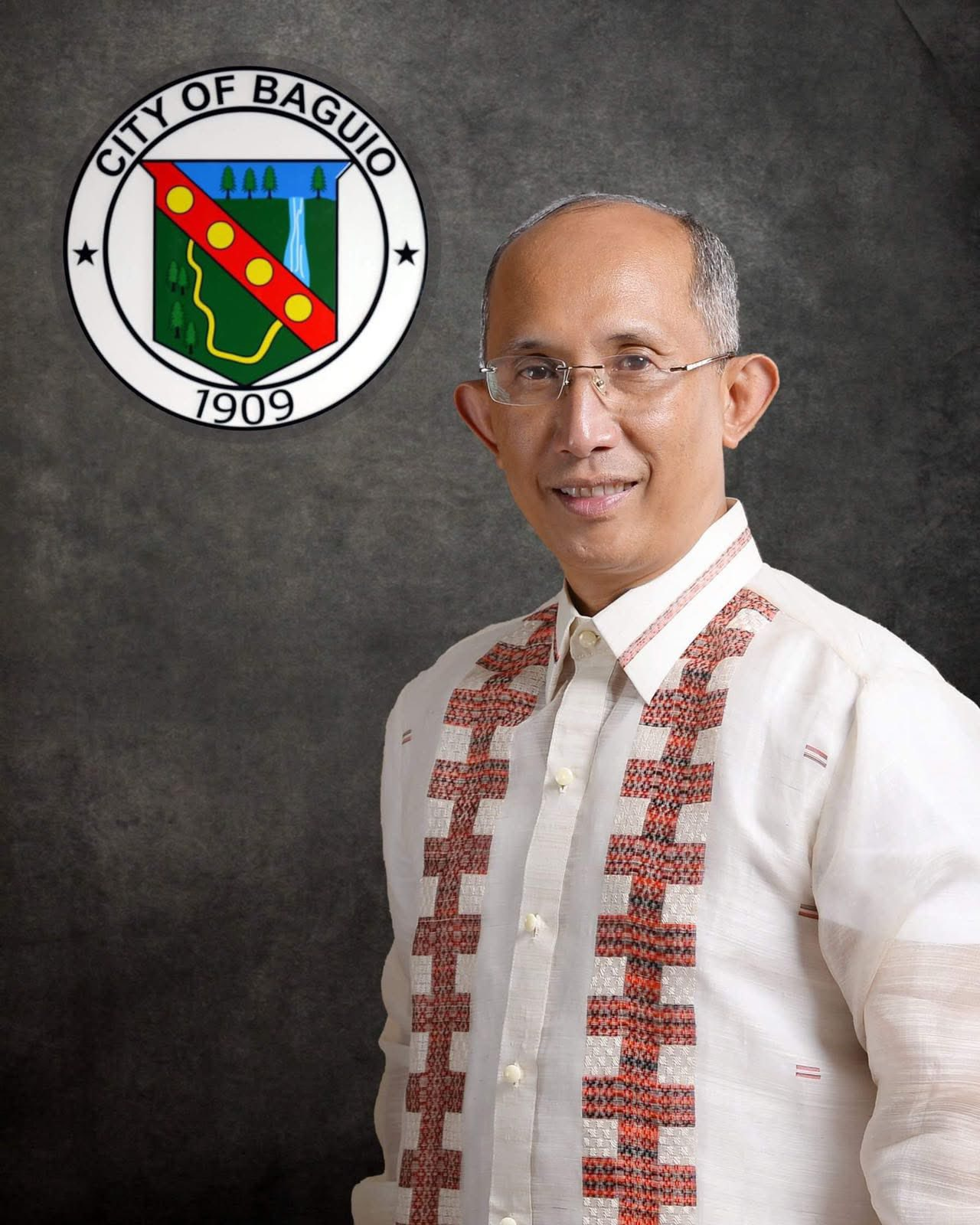
Benjamin Magalong

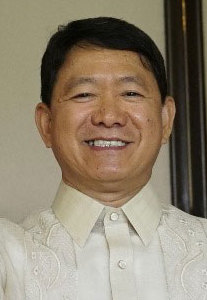
Eduardo Año

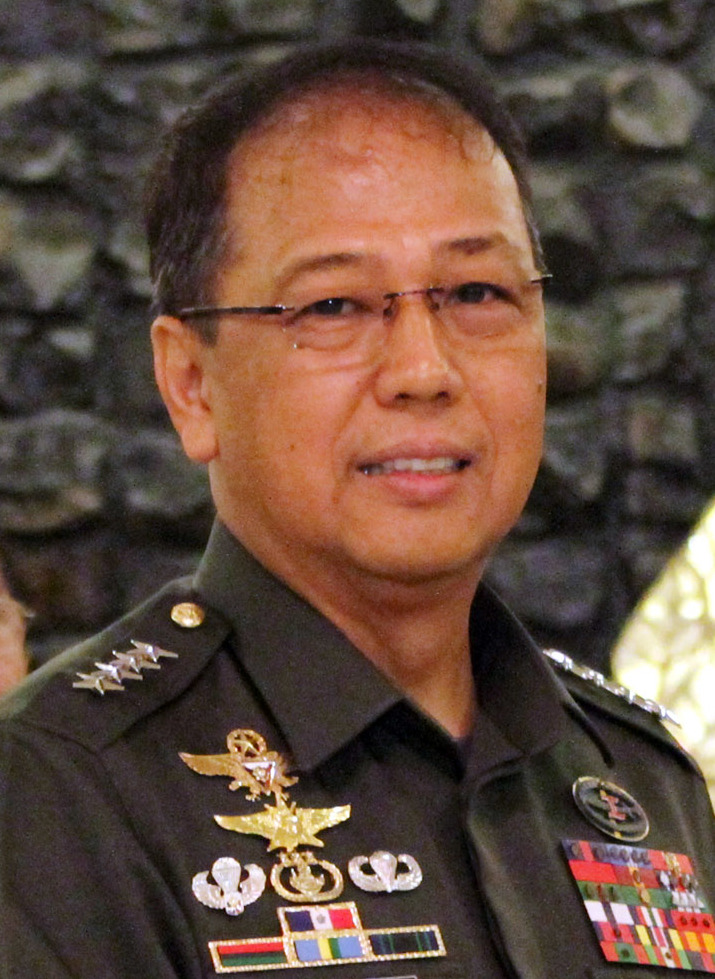
Carlito Galvez Jr.

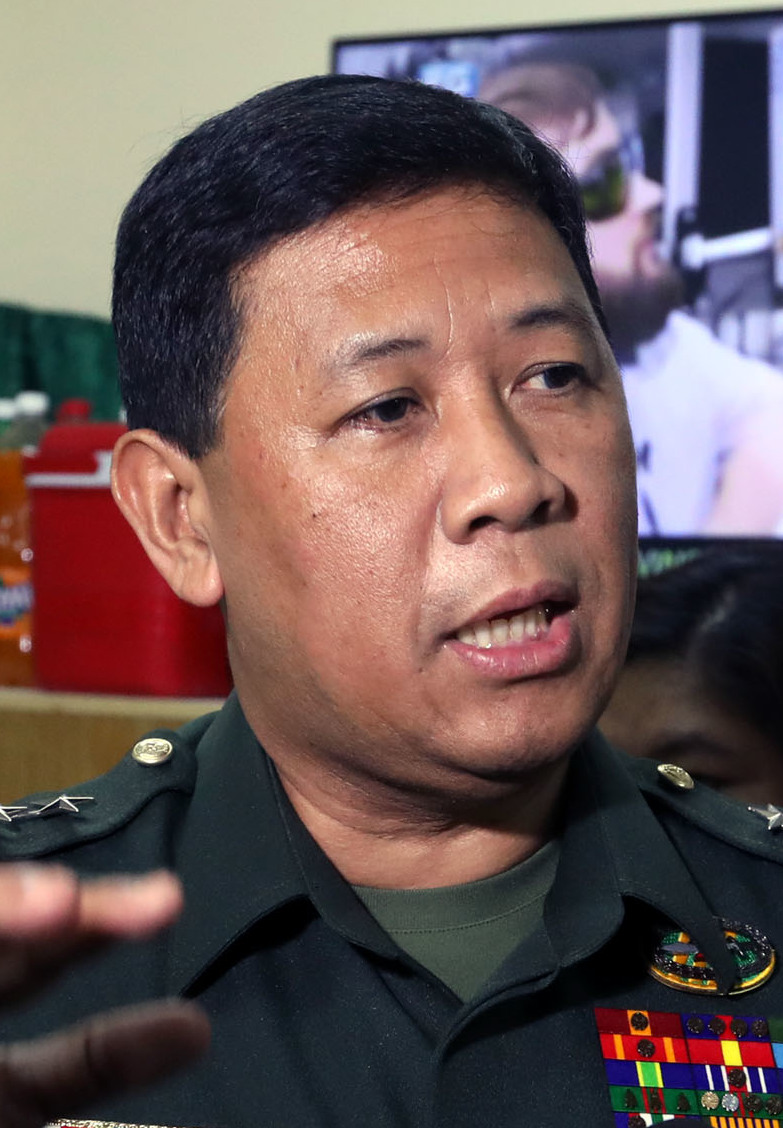
Benjamin Madrigal Jr.

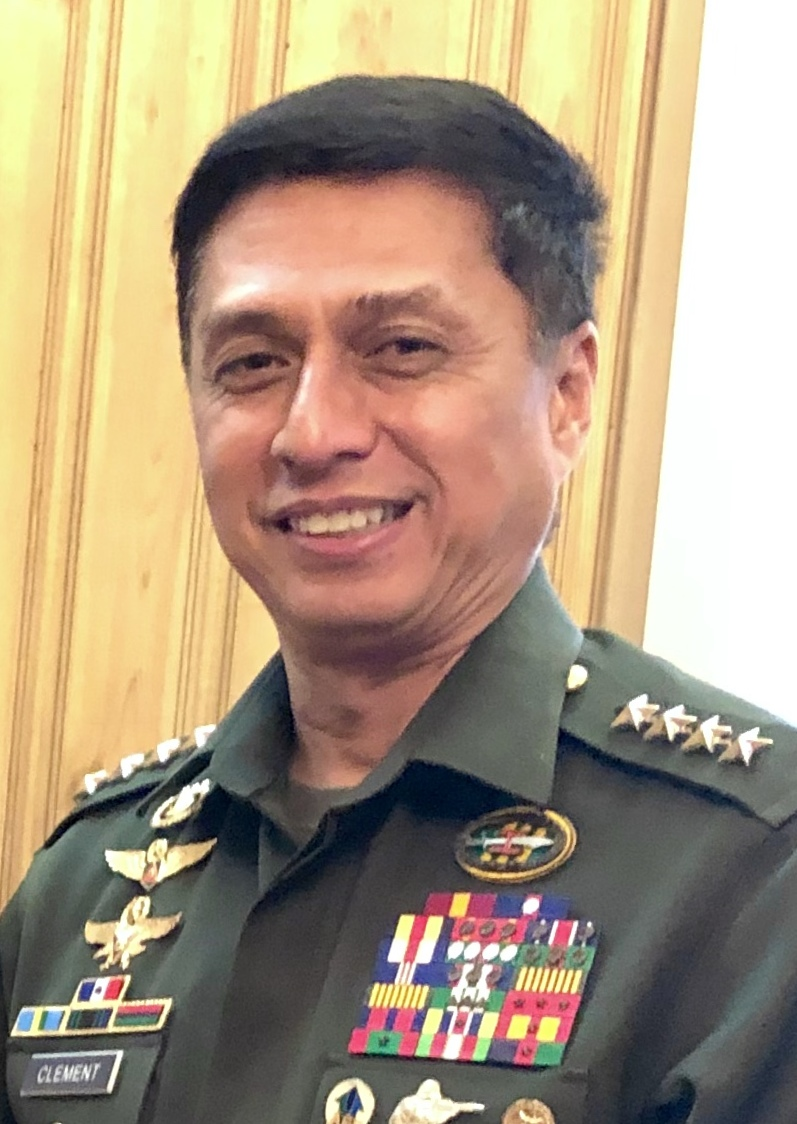
Noel Clement

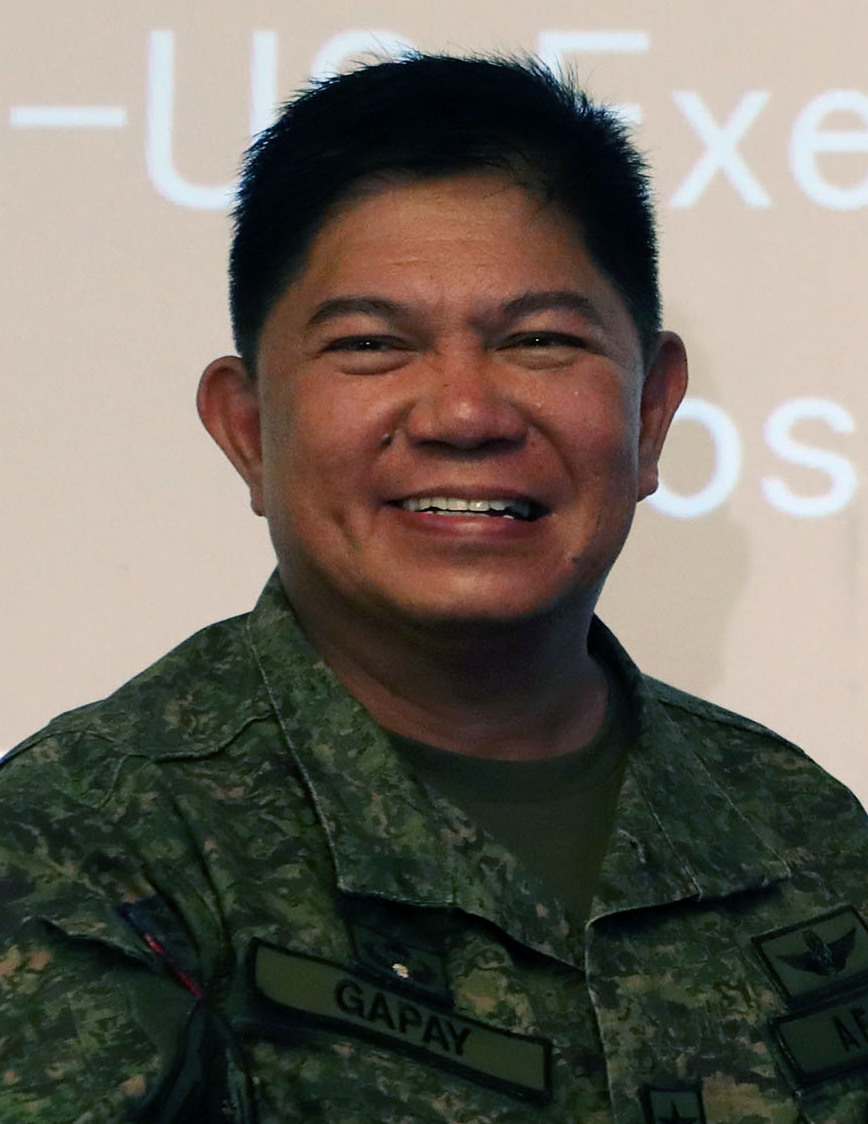
Gilbert Gapay

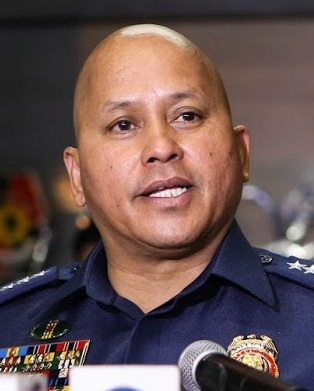
Ronald Dela Rosa

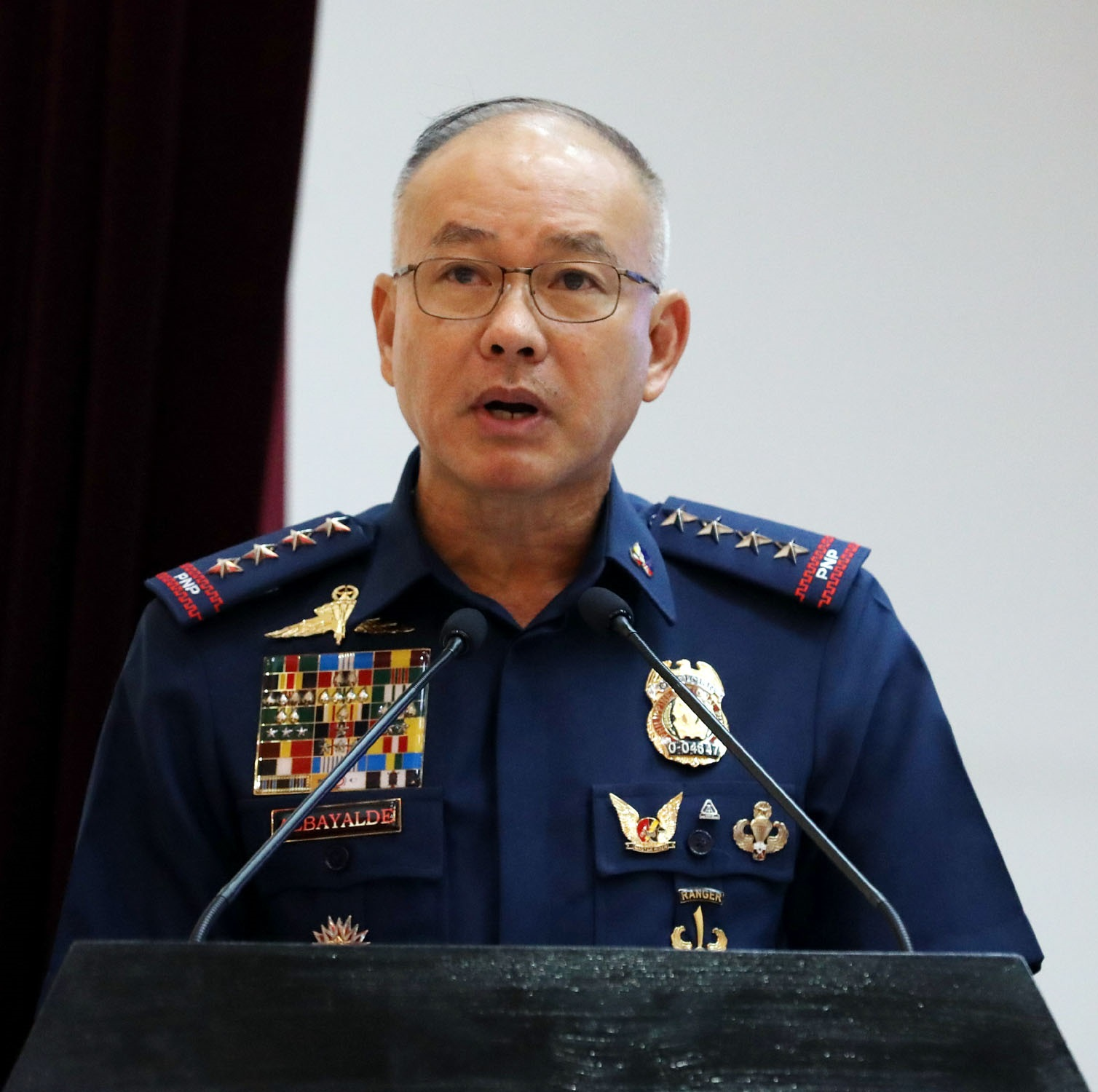
Oscar Albayalde

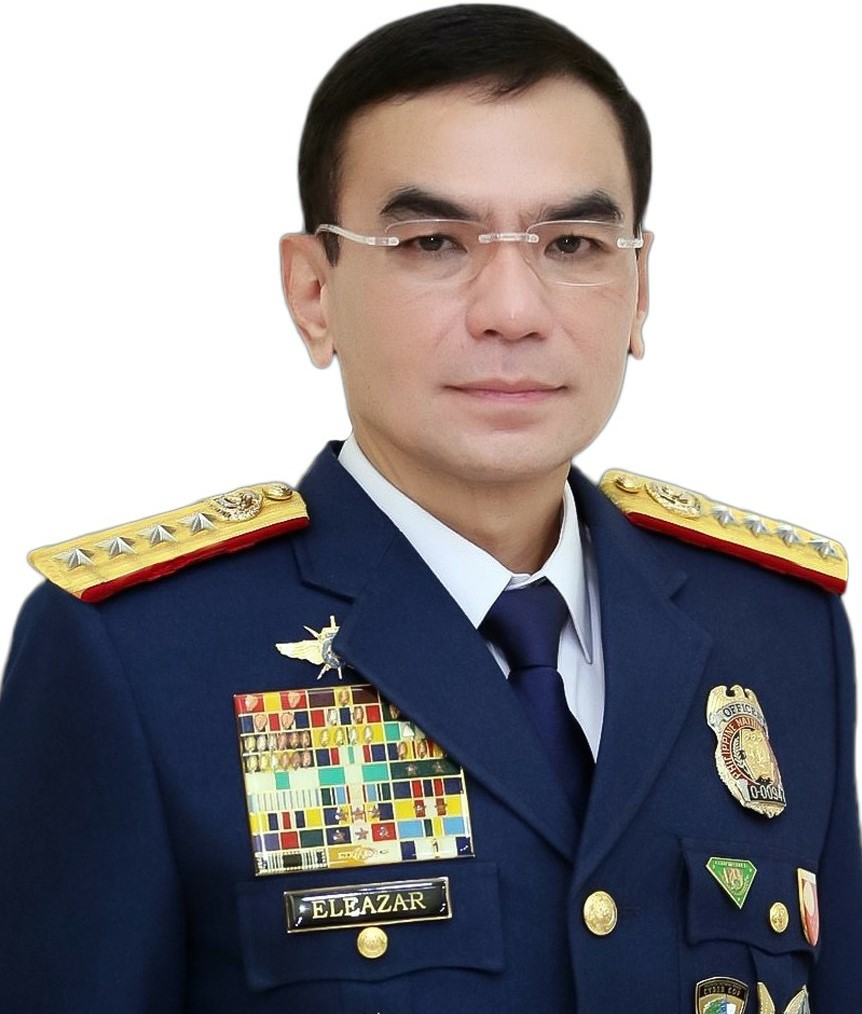
Guillermo Eleazar

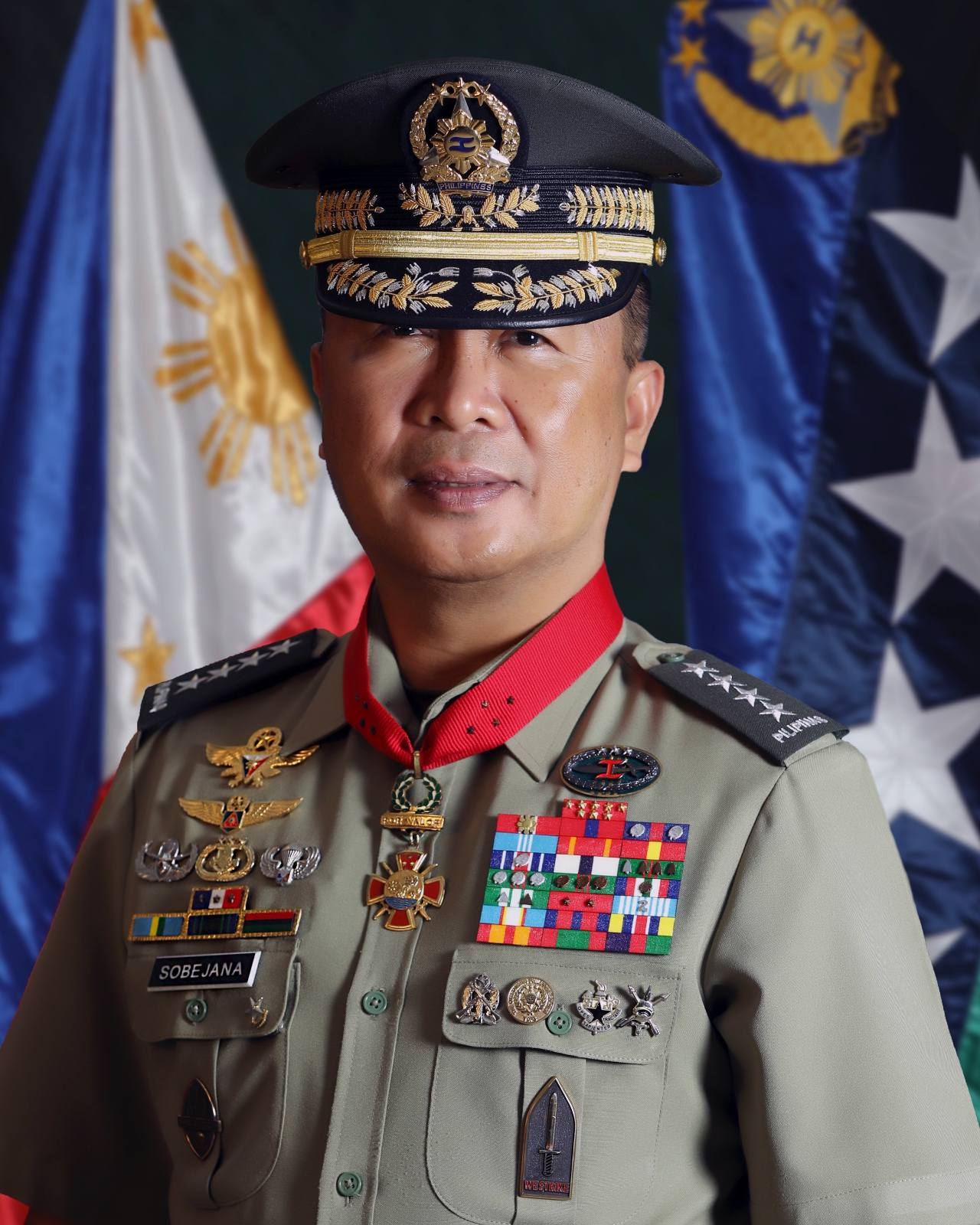
Cirilito Sobejana

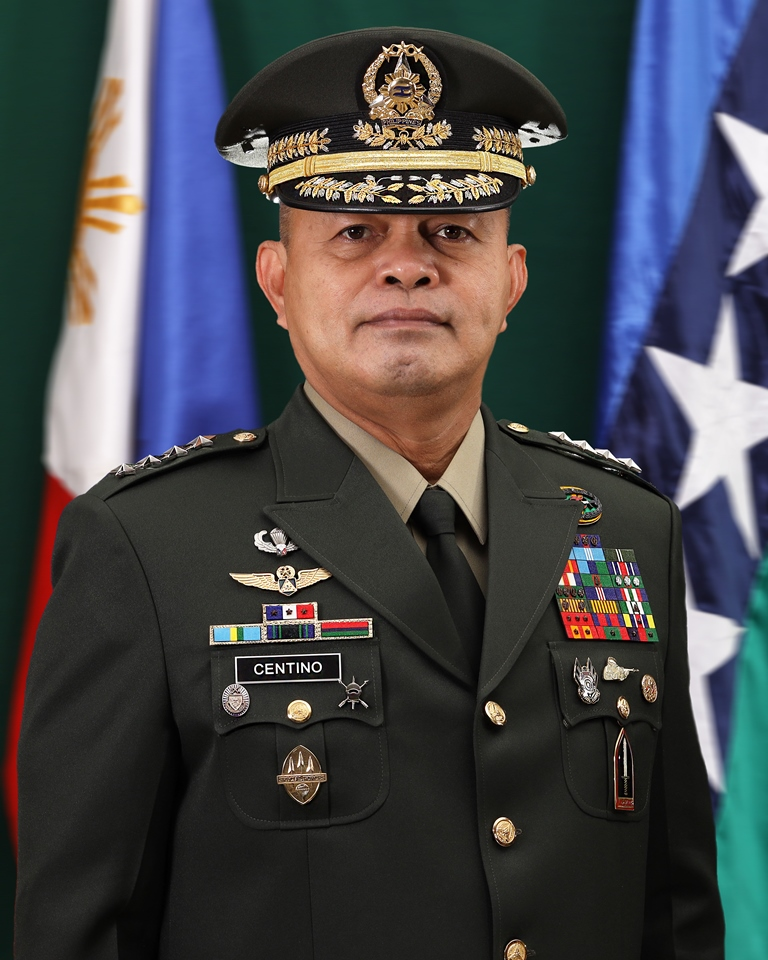
Andres Centino

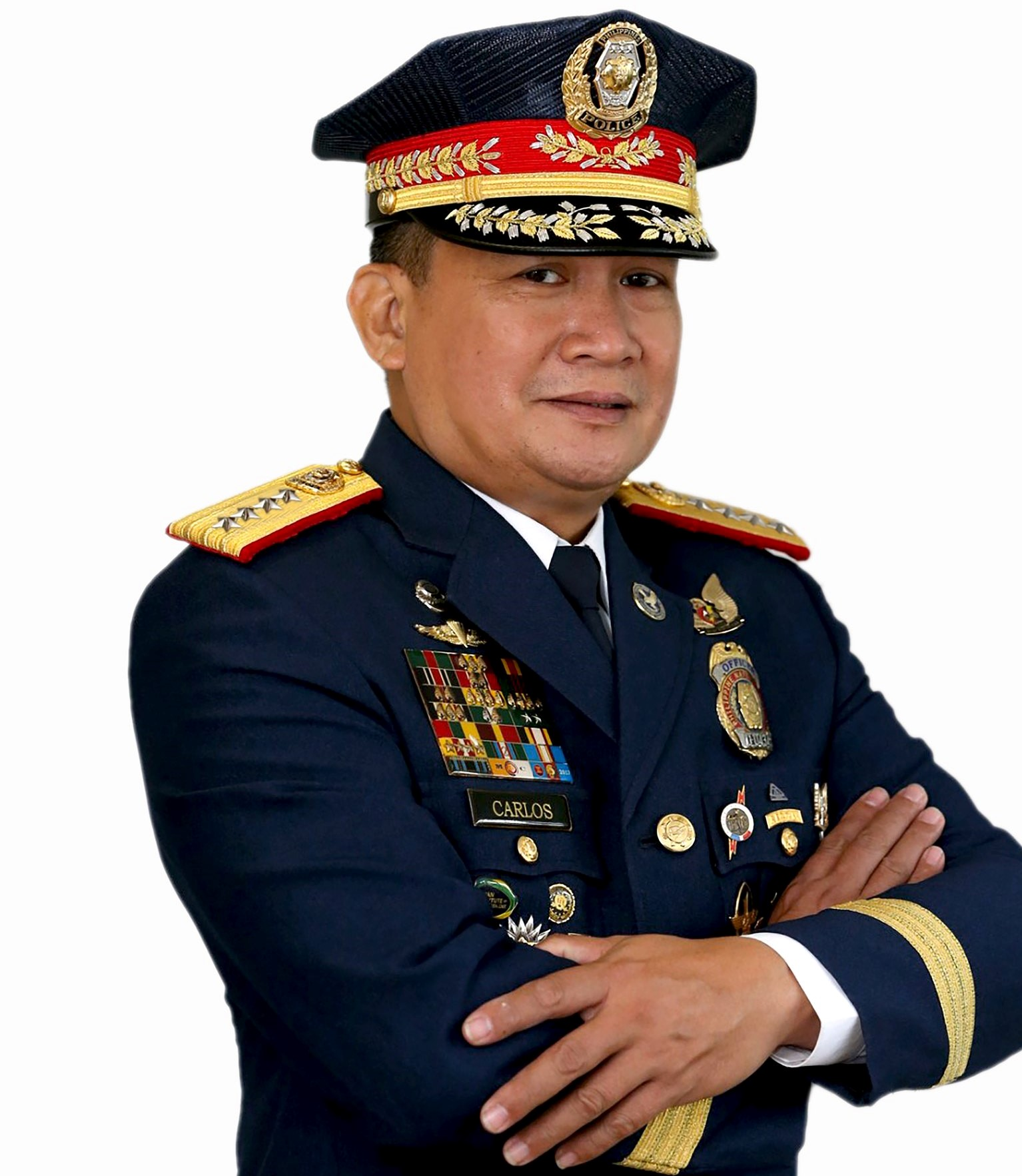
Dionardo Carlos

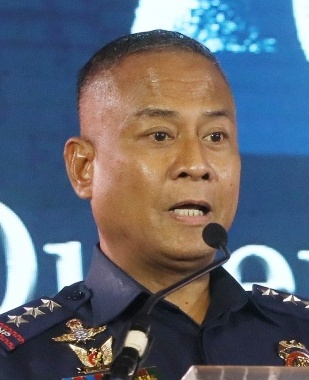
Vicente Danao

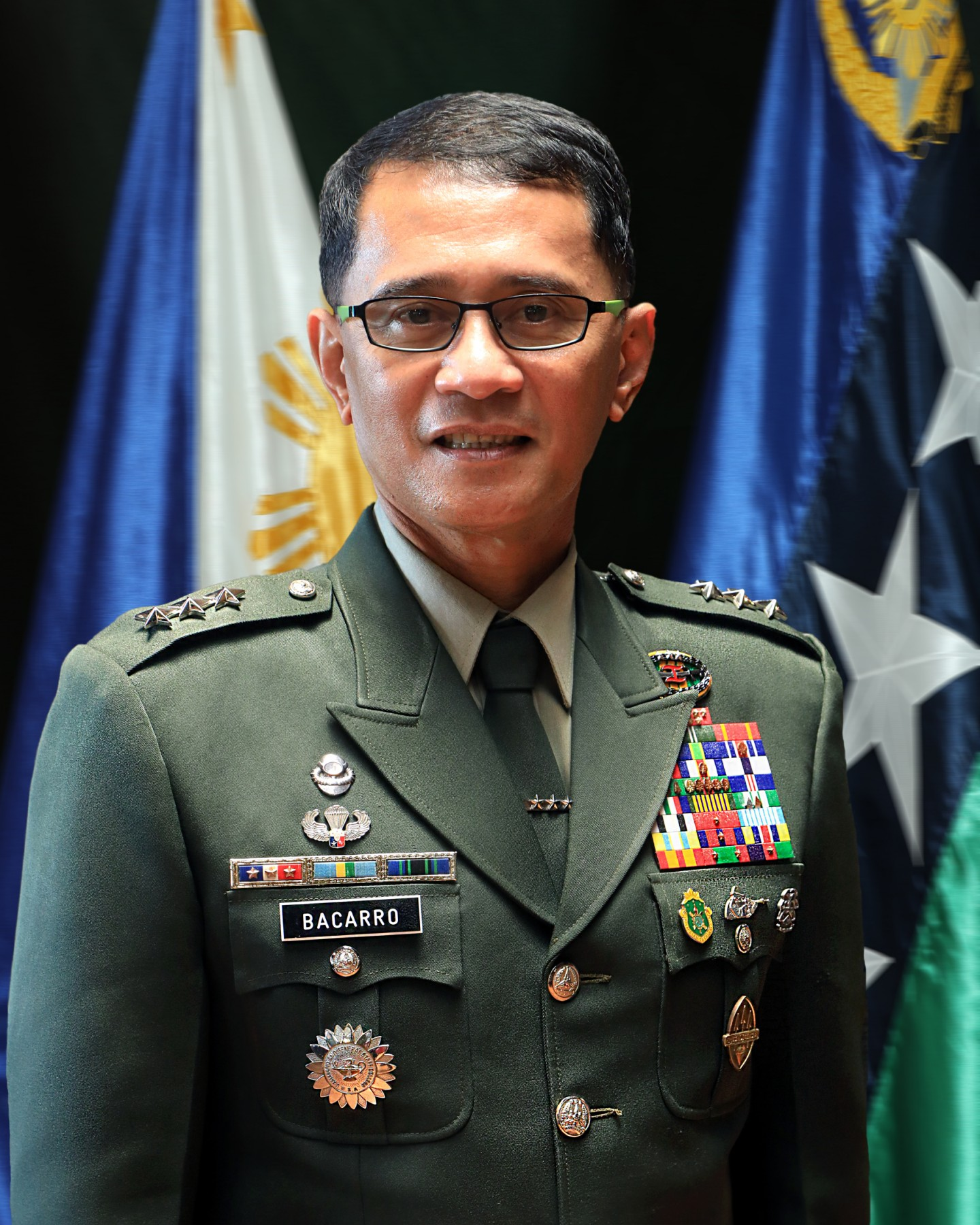
Bartolome Vicente Bacarro

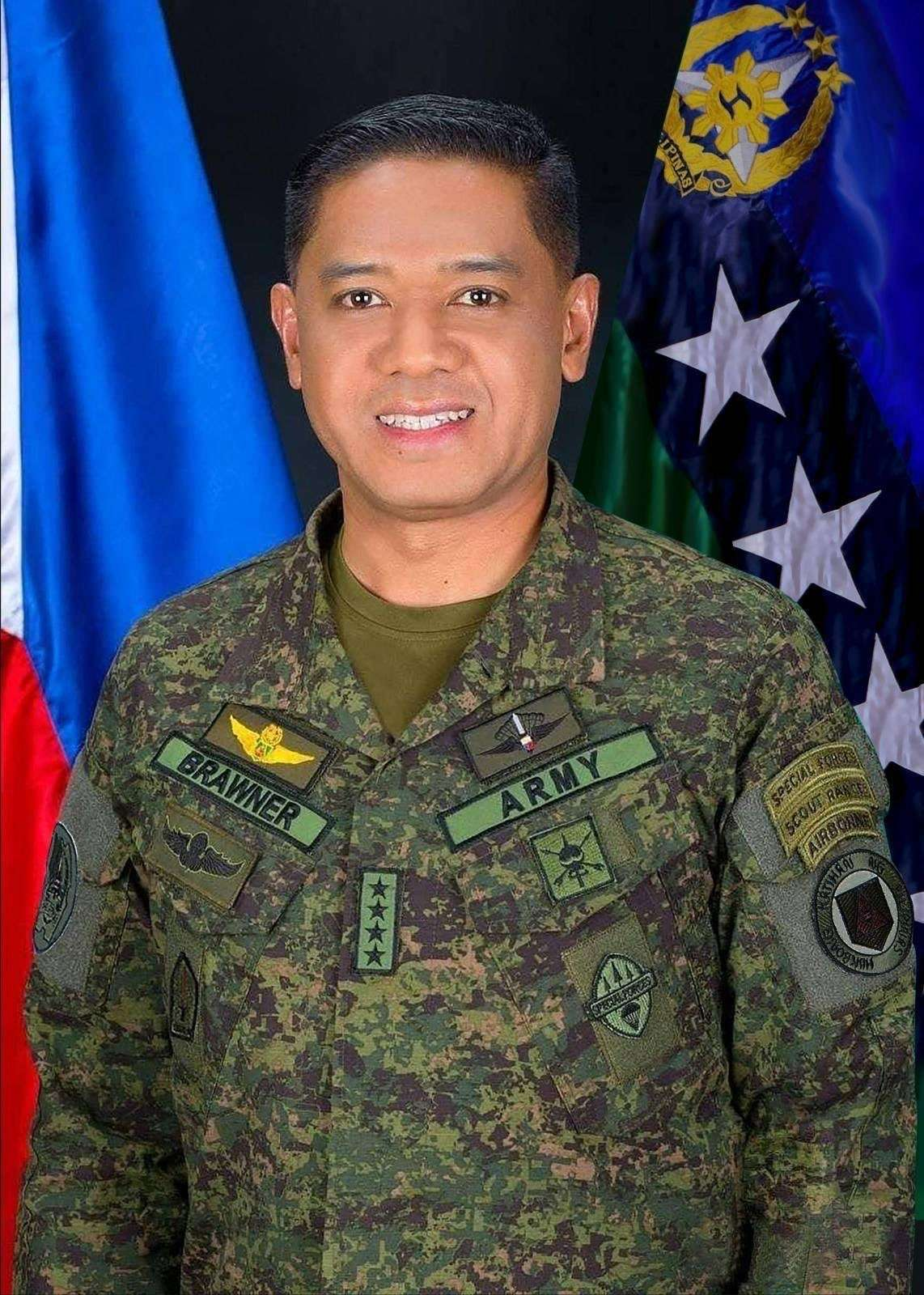
Romeo Brawner Jr.

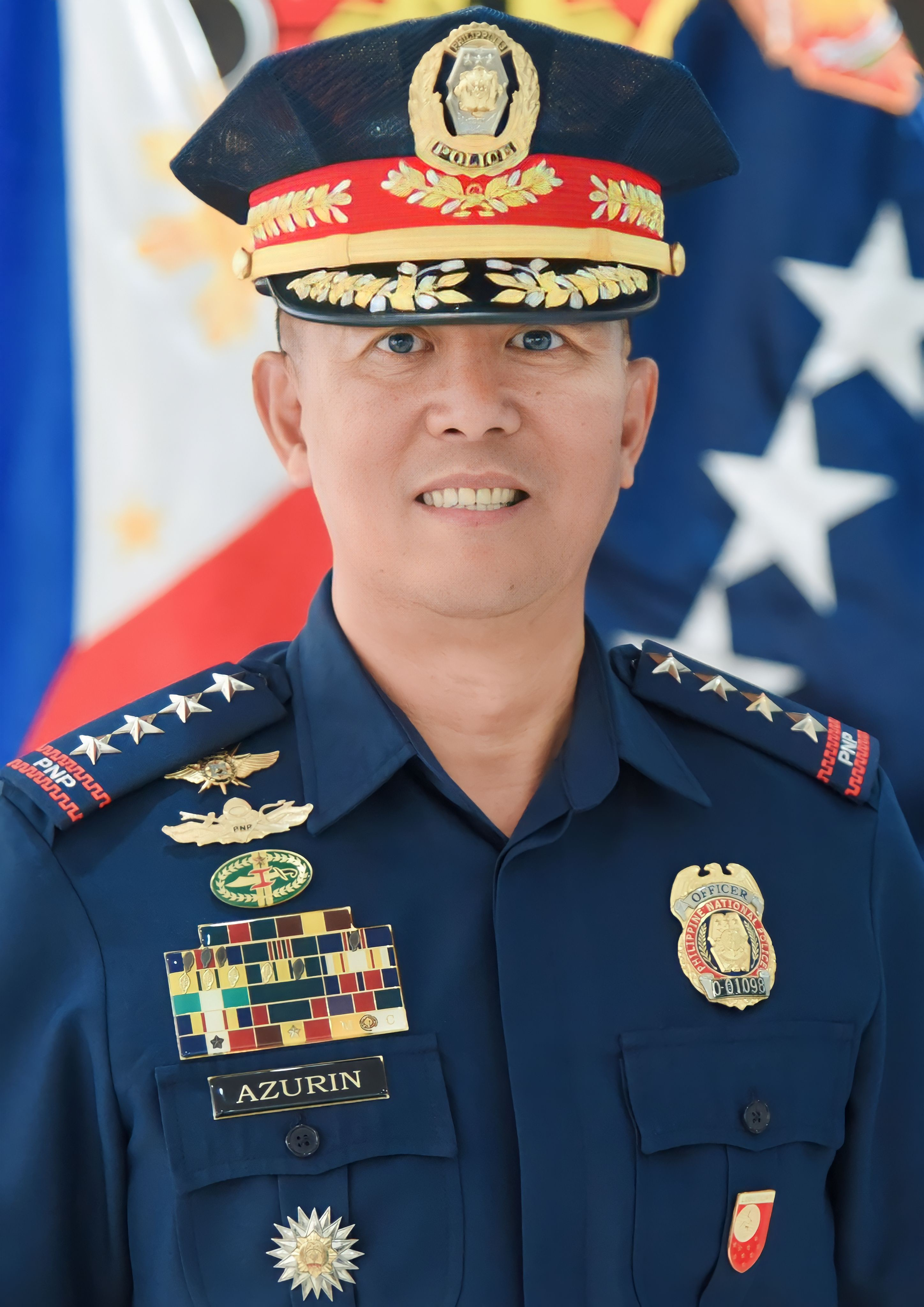
Rodolfo Azurin Jr.

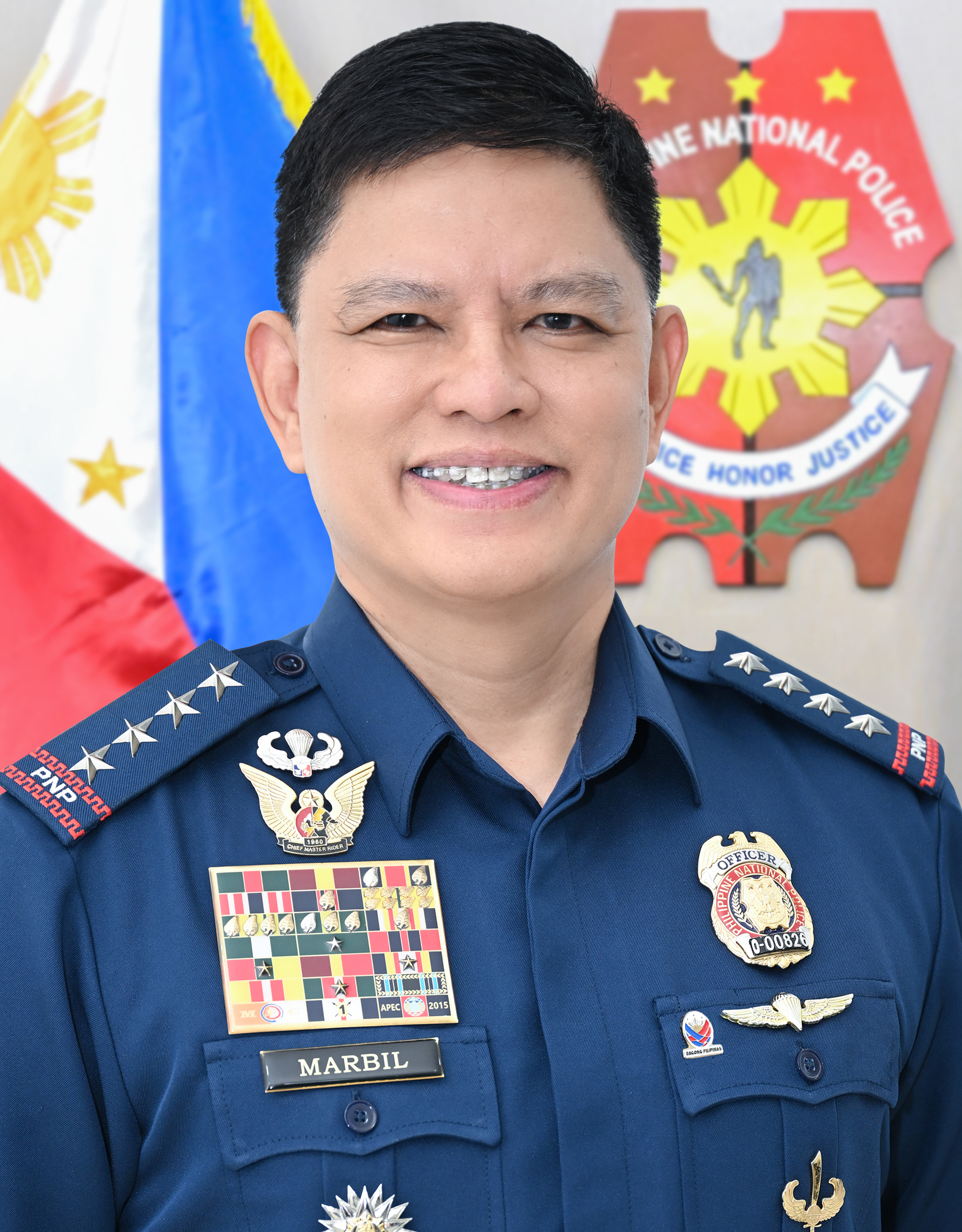
Rommel Marbil

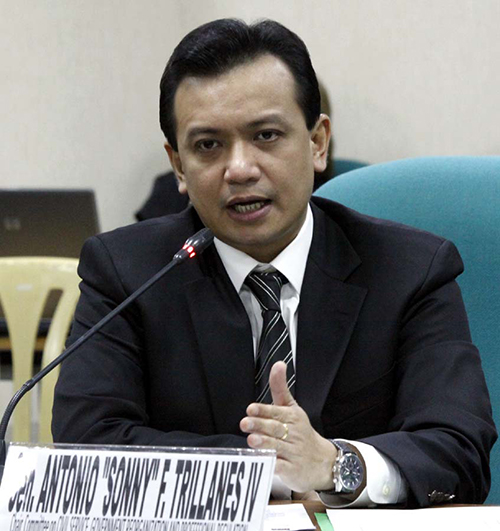
Antonio Trillanes
