= Camilo Cascolan =

Filipino police officer (1964–2023)

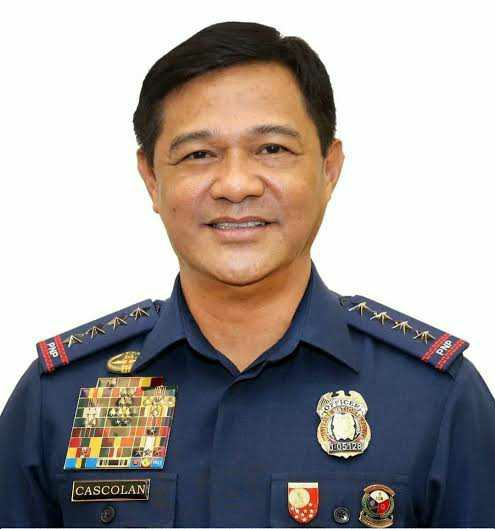
- Cascolan in 2020

Undersecretary of the Department of Health
- In office October 23, 2022 – November 24, 2023
- President: Bongbong Marcos
- Secretary: Maria Rosario Vergeire (OIC); Ted Herbosa

24th Chief of the Philippine National Police
- In office September 2, 2020 – November 10, 2020
- President: Rodrigo Duterte
- Preceded by: PGen. Archie Gamboa
- Succeeded by: PGen. Debold Sinas
Previous PNP positions
Deputy Chief for Administration of the Philippine National Police
In office January 20, 2020 – September 2, 2020
President	Rodrigo Duterte
Preceded by	PLTGEN. Archie Gamboa
Succeeded by	PLTGEN. Guillermo Eleazar
Deputy Chief for Operations of the Philippine National Police
In office October 12, 2019 – January 20, 2020
President	Rodrigo Duterte
Preceded by	PLTGEN. Archie Gamboa
Succeeded by	PLTGEN. Guillermo Eleazar
Chief of Directorial Staff of the Philippine National Police
In office September 1, 2018 – October 12, 2019
President	Rodrigo Duterte
Preceded by	PLTGEN. Archie Gamboa
Succeeded by	PLTGEN. Guillermo Eleazar
Director of PNP Civil Security Group
In office June 1, 2018 – September 1, 2018
President	Rodrigo Duterte
Regional Director of National Capital Region Police Office
In office April 19, 2018 – June 1, 2018
President	Rodrigo Duterte
Preceded by	PDir. Oscar Albayalde
Succeeded by	PMGen. Guillermo Eleazar
Director of PNP Directorate for Operations
In office July 1, 2016 – April 19, 2018
President	Rodrigo Duterte
Preceded by	PDir. Jonathan Miano
Succeeded by	PDir. Mao Aplasca
Regional Deputy Director for Administration of PNP Western Visayas Region Police Office
In office December 8, 2015 – June 30, 2016
President	Benigno S. Aquino III
Regional Deputy Director for Operations of PNP Autonomous Region in Muslim Mindanao Police Office
In office May 22, 2015 – December 8, 2015
President	Benigno S. Aquino III
Regional Chief of the Directorial Staff of PNP Davao Region Police Office
In office April 21, 2014 – May 22, 2015
President	Benigno S. Aquino III
Provincial Director of PNP Compostela Valley Police Office
In office July 23, 2012 – April 21, 2014
President	Benigno S. Aquino III

Personal details
- Born: Camilo Pancratius Pascua Cascolan; November 10, 1964 Baguio, Mountain Province, Philippines
- Died: November 24, 2023 (aged 59)
- Education: Philippine Military Academy (B.Sc. Mil.); University of the Philippines Visayas (MPA)
- Nickname: Pikoy

Military service
- Allegiance: Philippines
- Branch/service: Philippine Constabulary
- Years of service: 1986–1991
- Police career
- Service: Philippine National Police
- Allegiance: Philippines
- Divisions: PNP Deputy Chief for Administration; PNP Deputy Chief for Operations; PNP Directorial Staff; PNP Civil Security Group; NCRPO; PNP Directorate for Operations; PNP Police Regional Office 6; PNP Police Regional Office ARMM; Compostela Valley Police Provincial Office; PNP Police Regional Office 11
- Service years: 1991–2020
- Rank: Police General

Camilo Pancratius Pascua Cascolan (November 10, 1964 – November 24, 2023) was a Filipino police general who served as the 24th Chief of the Philippine National Police (PNP) from September to November 2020 under President Rodrigo Duterte. After his retirement from the PNP, President Bongbong Marcos appointed him as an undersecretary of the Department of Health where he served from October 2022 until his death in November 2023. He was the first Cordilleran to lead the country's national police force.

Cascolan served five years with the Philippine Constabulary and 28 years with the PNP. He graduated from the Philippine Military Academy in 1986 and joined the police force in 1992. He served as chief of police in three municipalities in Iloilo in the 1990s and the city of Taguig in the late 2000s. He then rose through the ranks to become Provincial Director of the Compostela Valley (now Davao de Oro) Police in 2012, Regional Deputy Chief of the former Autonomous Region in Muslim Mindanao Police in 2015, Regional Deputy Chief of the Western Visayas Police in 2016, and Regional Director of National Capital Region Police in 2018. He then held key leadership positions within the PNP and served as Deputy Chief for Operations of the PNP from 2019 to 2020 and Deputy Chief for Administration in 2020 before becoming the country's police chief.

== Early life and education ==
Camilo Pancratius Pascua Cascolan was born on November 10, 1964, in the city of Baguio in what was then the undivided Mountain Province (now the province of Benguet). He was initially educated at Maryknoll Convent School and later attended the University of the Philippines Baguio High School. Cascolan had originally planned to enter the priesthood, but eventually chose to pursue a military career upon his parents' advice. He signed up for the Philippine Military Academy in 1982 and graduated with the Sinagtala Class of 1986, whose alumni included his predecessors in the national police, Archie Gamboa, Oscar Albayalde and Bato de la Rosa.

Cascolan later earned a Master of Public Administration degree from the University of the Philippines Visayas in 1995.

== Career ==
=== Philippine Constabulary ===
Cascolan's first assignment after completing military school in Baguio was with the then-Philippine Constabulary Special Action Force of Central Mindanao (former Region XII) based in Parang, Maguindanao del Norte from July to December 1987. He served as a S2/3 officer deployed in the operations against the secessionist Moro Islamic Liberation Front. He was then assigned to the 324th Public Company and Reconnaissance Company in Iloilo province where he would spend most of his junior and mid-level military career.

In April 1988, Cascolan was assigned as an aide-de-camp to the Western Visayas (Region VI) Regional Command, returning briefly to his former reconnaissance battalion in March 1990 before assuming the command of the 2nd Iloilo Citizen Armed Force Geographical Unit (CAFGU) active auxiliary unit in 1992. He also eventually served as officer-in-charge of the 324th Public Company and the Regional Command VI before his designation as executive officer and section leader of the Iloilo Strike Force in the same year.

=== Philippine National Police ===
Cascolan began his law enforcement career in May 1992 when he joined the newly formed Philippine National Police as station chief of Barotac Nuevo, still in Iloilo province. His next police assignments in the province were as commanding officer of the 1st Iloilo Provincial Mobile Group in Tigbauan in August 1994, group director of the 3rd mobile group in Sara in August 1997, chief of police in Ajuy in March 1998, and chief of police in Balasan in April 1998.

Cascolan was based in Metro Manila from 1999 to 2007. He served as chief of the criminal investigation, research and special studies divisions of the Philippine Center on Transnational Crime in Camp Crame until 2001 and as member of the Criminal Investigation and Detection Group until 2003. He then held various positions within the Aviation Security Group before transferring to Cebu City as chief of the Central Visayas (Region VII) ASG command in 2007. He returned to Manila the following year to assume command of the Taguig City Police Station until 2010. He then moved back to Camp Crame as case monitoring chief before being posted back to the field in Mindanao and Western Visayas.

Cascolan served as finance chief of the Davao Region Police Office based in Davao City from 2011 to 2012. He was then designated as provincial director of the former Compostela Valley province for two years. As provincial police chief, he implemented a strategic operational plan that significantly reduced the crime volume and improved crime clearance and solution through inter-agency coordination. Three of the top New People's Army fugitives in the province were arrested in 2012 under his watch. In April 2014, he returned to Davao City as regional chief of the directorial staff. His last assignment in Mindanao was as Regional Deputy Chief for Operations of the former Autonomous Region in Muslim Mindanao (ARMM) Police Office based in Cotabato City from May to December 2015. Cascolan also served briefly as regional deputy for administration of the Western Visayas Region Police Office back in Iloilo province from December 2015 to May 2016 where he received his first star rank.

Cascolan assumed the Directorate for Operations of the PNP in June 2016 upon the appointment of his mistah (batchmate in the Philippine Military Academy) Bato dela Rosa as PNP Chief. As operations director, he was credited as one of the co-authors of Operation Double Barrel that launched the Philippine drug war. He took part in strategic planning to implement a nationwide "Common Plan" to "neutralize" alleged criminals in the drug war. He was also instrumental in introducing home defense security through an enhanced managing police operations manual. He was promoted to two-star rank in January 2017. Cascolan was then assigned with the National Capital Region Police Office as regional director in April 2018. As Metro Manila police chief, he lobbied for an eight-hour workday for uniformed personnel and for police officers to be assigned near their residence for efficiency. He was removed from the post after only six weeks after disagreements with his predecessor and then-PNP Chief Oscar Albayalde who ordered a twelve-hour workday for all personnel. He was reassigned with the PNP Civil Security Group as a short-term director before taking on higher leadership roles in Camp Crame beginning September 2018.

Cascolan was promoted to Chief of Directorial Staff and earned his three-star rank in October 2018. He then served as Deputy Chief for Operations in October 2019 and quickly rose to the position of Deputy Chief for Administration, the number 2 man of the national police, barely four months later. As a senior police officer, he conducted the transfer of police training programs from the Philippine Public Safety College back to the Philippine National Police Academy. He also authored the Camp Crame Development Plan which aimed to decentralize the national police force offices to the provinces. He is also recognized as the brains behind the Wanted Person Information System (E-WPIS) and E-Rogue which provide online access to criminal profiles for police officers.

On September 1, 2020, Cascolan was selected by President Rodrigo Duterte as the 22nd Chief of the Philippine National Police. He took up the appointment the following day after the mandatory retirement of Archie Gamboa.

After his death in 2023, Manila Representative Benny Abante revealed that Iloilo City Mayor Jed Patrick Mabilog did not return to the Philippines in 2017 because of Cascolan's call informing him that he will be killed by police unless he implicated opposition senators Mar Roxas and Franklin Drilon on charges of drug trafficking.

On February 13, 2026, the International Criminal Court posthumously included Cascolan among eight indirect co-perpetrators in the crimes against humanity case against president Duterte during the Philippine drug war.

==== Key positions ====
- Chief of Police, Taguig City Police Station
- Provincial Director, Compostela Valley Police Provincial Office
- Chief, Police Regional Office 11 Finance Division
- Chief, Police Regional Office 11 Directorial Staff
- Deputy Director for Operations, Police Regional Office ARMM
- Deputy Director for Administration, Police Regional Office 11
- Director, Directorate for Operations
- Regional Director, NCRPO
- Director, PNP Civil Security Group
- Chief, PNP Directorial Staff
- Deputy Chief PNP for Operations
- Deputy Chief PNP for Administration
- Chief, PNP

== Personal life and death ==
Cascolan was married to Amelia Tanalgo of Santa Barbara, Iloilo, and they had adopted a child from one of Amelia's close relatives.

Cascolan died on 24 November 2023, at the age of 59.

== Awards ==
Cascolan received more than 180 medals throughout his military and police career. As Davao de Oro provincial police chief, he was awarded the Medalya ng Kadakilaan (PNP Heroism Medal) for his leadership and humanitarian work following the devastation of Typhoon Bopha in 2012. Cascolan is also a recipient of the 2015 Country's Outstanding Police Officers in Service (COPS) award conferred by Metrobank Foundation. In 2019, he also received the Award for Continuing Excellence and Service (ACES) from Metrobank.

- Philippine Republic Presidential Unit Citation
- People Power II Unit Citation
- Officer, Philippine Legion of Honor
- Medalya ng Katapatan sa Paglilingkod (PNP Distinguished Service Medal)
- Medalya ng Katangitanging Gawa (PNP Outstanding Achievement Medal)
- Military Commendation Medals
- Medalya ng Paglaban sa Manliligalig (PNP Anti-dissidence Campaign Medal)
- Medalya ng Pagtulong sa Nasalanta (PNP Disaster Relief and Rehabilitation Operations Campaign Medal)
- Medalya ng Paglilingkod sa Luzon (PNP Luzon Campaign Medal)
