= Guillermo Eleazar =

24th Chief of the Philippine National Police

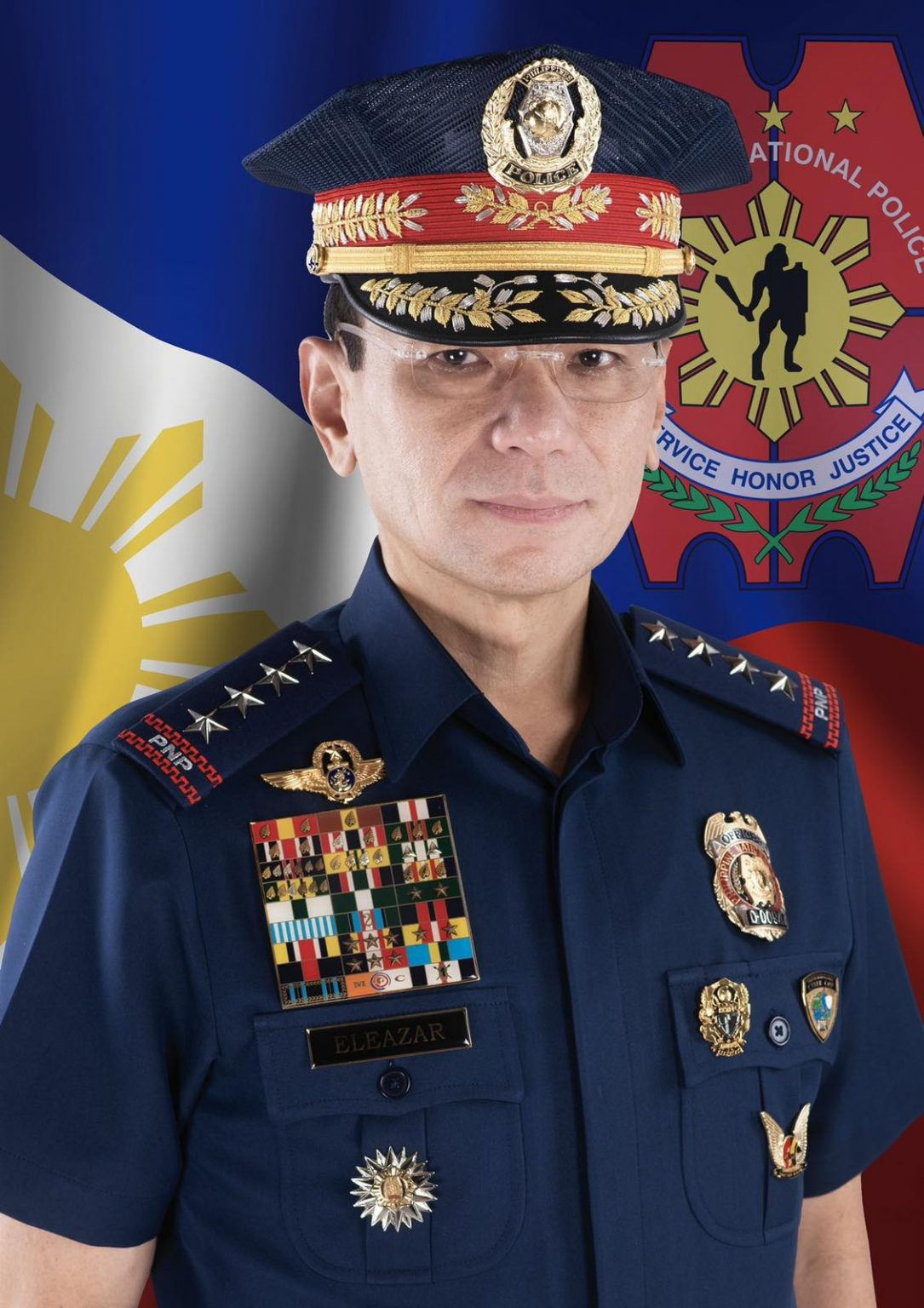
- Official portrait, 2021

26th Chief of the Philippine National Police
- In office May 8, 2021 – November 13, 2021
- President: Rodrigo Duterte
- Preceded by: PGen. Debold M. Sinas
- Succeeded by: PGen. Dionardo B. Carlos
Previous PNP positions
Deputy Chief for Administration of the Philippine National Police
In office September 2, 2020 – May 8, 2021
President	Rodrigo Duterte
Preceded by	PLTGEN. Camilo Pancratius P. Cascolan
Succeeded by	PLTGEN. Joselito M. Vera Cruz
Deputy Chief for Operations of the Philippine National Police
In office January 20, 2020 – September 2, 2020
President	Rodrigo Duterte
Preceded by	PLTGEN. Camilo Cascolan
Succeeded by	PLTGEN. Cesar Hawthrone R. Binag
Commander of the Joint Task Force COVID-19 Shield
In office March 16, 2020 – November 22, 2020
President	Rodrigo Duterte
Preceded by	Position created
Succeeded by	PLTGEN. Cesar Hawthorne R. Binag
Chief of Directoral Staff of the Philippine National Police
In office October 16, 2019 – January 20, 2020
President	Rodrigo Duterte
Preceded by	PLTGEN. Camilo Cascolan
Succeeded by	PLTGEN. Cesar Hawthrone R. Binag
Regional Director of the National Capital Region Police Office
In office June 1, 2018 – October 16, 2019
President	Rodrigo Duterte
Preceded by	PDir. Camilo Cascolan
Succeeded by	PMGen. Debold Sinas
Regional Director of the PNP Police Regional Office 4A
In office April 18, 2018 – June 1, 2018
President	Rodrigo Duterte
Preceded by	PCSupt. Ma'o R. Aplasca
Succeeded by	PBGen. Edward E. Carranza
District Director of the Quezon City Police District
In office July 1, 2016 – April 18, 2018
President	Rodrigo Duterte
Preceded by	PCSupt. Edgardo G. Tinio
Succeeded by	PCSupt. Joselito T. Esquivel

Personal details
- Born: Guillermo Lorenzo Tolentino Eleazar; November 13, 1965 (age 60) Tagkawayan, Quezon, Philippines
- Party: Reporma
- Education: Philippine Military Academy
- Police career
- Service: Philippine National Police
- Allegiance: Philippines
- Divisions: PNP Deputy Chief for Administration; JTF COVID-19 Shield; PNP Deputy Chief for Operations; PNP Directorial Staff; National Capital Region Police Office; Police Regional Office 4A; Quezon City Police District; PNP Anti-Cybercrime Group
- Service years: 1987–2021
- Rank: Police General

Guillermo Lorenzo Tolentino Eleazar (Tagalog pronunciation: [ʔɛljaˈzaɾ]; born November 13, 1965) is a Filipino retired police officer and general who served as Chief of the Philippine National Police (PNP) from May to November 2021. He was also the Deputy Chief of Administration in PNP.

Graduating cum laude from the Philippine Military Academy, Eleazar joined the Philippine National Police in 1987. In July 2016, he became the Director of the Quezon City Police District. In May 2018, he became the chief of the National Capital Region Police Office. The next year, he was promoted to three-star general. He was also the leader of protection from COVID-19 from March to November 2020.

On May 5, 2021, Eleazar became the Chief of the Philippine National Police. Eleazar added policies related to COVID-19 and other issues. His tenure was relatively supported by government officials and multiple senators. He was succeeded on November 13, 2021, retiring shortly after.

After his tenure as chief, Eleazar ran for a position in the Senate in the 2022 Philippine general election with the Partido para sa Demokratikong Reporma party, as part of the Lacson-Sotto senatorial slate. He received endorsements from a professional association of security guards and private investigators and from the Christian Iglesia ni Cristo community. He lost, gaining 16th place with 11,194,886 votes.

== Early life ==
Guillermo Eleazar was born in Tagkawayan, Quezon, on November 13, 1965. His father, Victor Eleazar, was a war veteran. He went to the Philippine Christian University, earning a master's degree in public administration. In 1987, he graduated from the Philippine Military Academy (PMA). He was among the top four in the Hinirang Class of 1987 in the PMA, graduating cum laude. The academy later bestowed on Eleazar the Cavalier Award, which is given to alumni the institution sees as demonstrating excellence.

=== Personal life ===
He is called "Guillor" or "Gemo" by his friends. With his wife Lally Hernandez, he has four children.

== Career ==
=== Police ===
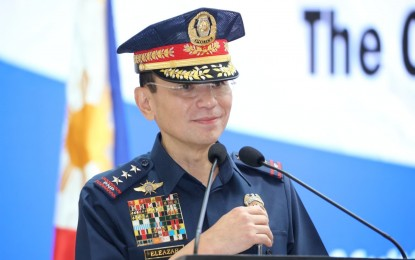
Eleazar in 2019 giving a speech.

By 2000, Eleazar was Chief Inspector at the Police Regional Office 4 (PRO-4). That year, he received an award for Junior Police Commissioned Officer of the Year from the Philippine National Police (PNP). During his tenure, Eleazar helped bust the biggest cybersex gang in Central Luzon. In 2018, he became the Quezon City Police District director after a recommendation by DILG Secretary Eduardo Año. His promotion was supported by the Civil Service Commission and the National Police Commission.

On June 1, 2018, he became the Regional Director of the National Capital Region Police Office (NCRPO) after a shuffle in positions; he stayed in this role until the following June. During his time in the role, the NCRPO arrested 293 drug suspects, a 369.6% increase from June 2016. In November 2018, Eleazar threatened to sue over the spread of a viral photo containing a picture of him with a Chinese official.

On March 6, 2019, Eleazar shamed a police officer for extortion in front of the media. The same day, he was filmed violently lashing out, slapping, and cursing at Corporal Marlon Quibete, an office with the Eastern Police District's drug enforcement unit, who had also been arrested for extortion. The videos of the latter incident went viral, and Eleazar's actions received popular acclaim. Conversely, the outburst was condemned by the Commission on Human Rights as a deprivation of the right to humane treatment and presumption of innocence; the Volunteers Against Crime and Corruption countered the concerned parties by defending Eleazar, reasoning of the rising number of police corruption cases. Eleazar justified his actions, given reputational damage to the police from previous incidents. His public shaming was backed by politicians and officials, including Panfilo Lacson, Eduardo Año, Sherwin Gatchalian, Oscar Albayalde, and the then-sitting president Rodrigo Duterte. Following the incident, Eleazar fired two chiefs for the same reason.

In December 2019, Eleazar was promoted to three-star general. From September 2020 to May 2021, he was the Deputy Chief of Administration in PNP. He was also the Commander of the Joint Task Force against the COVID-19 virus from March to November 2020. He served as Deputy Chief for Administration of the PNP just before his appointment as Chief.

==== Chief ====
On May 5, 2021, Eduardo Año announced Eleazar's designation as the next Chief of the Philippine National Police after the acceptance of Rodrigo Duterte. The appointment named him the sixth chief under the Duterte administration.

His appointment was praised by figures in the government. Senate President Tito Sotto said that his administration would be the "best choice ever". Senator Win Gatchalian expressed that Eleazar's administration is "no-nonsense" and "action-oriented". He also gained support from the outgoing chief, Debold Sinas, who pledged "100-percent support" to him. Eleazar supported the removal of corruption in PNP. He opposed hazing in the Philippine National Police Academy after an incident caused the death of a cadet. On June 1, 2021, he berated a police master sergeant for killing a 52-year-old woman. Eleazar was filmed lashing out and violently slamming the master sergeant on a wall while angrily admonishing him.

During his time as chief, Eleazar encouraged the police to enforce strict border monitoring, and ordered police to use social media to promote COVID-19 vaccines to the populace. He instituted a large educational program to teach police officers how to use their cameras. He was succeeded by a Quezonian, Dionardo Carlos, as PNP Chief on November 13, 2021. He retired following his administration.

==== Key positions ====
- Acting Director, PNP Anti-Cybercrime Group
- Director, Quezon City Police District
- Regional Director, Police Regional Office 4A CALABARZON
- Regional Director, NCRPO
- Chief of Directorial Staff
- Deputy Chief PNP for Operations
- Deputy Chief PNP for Administration
  - Commander, Joint Task Force (JTF) COVID-19 Shield (concurrent capacity)
- Chief, PNP

== 2022 Senate bid ==
Election results for Eleazar per province.

In July 2021, YouTube channel "PH Breaking News" posted a video on the platform in which Eleazar appeared to dismiss candidates which supported New People's Army (NPA) rebels, gaining a total of 20,324 views. News website Rappler fact-checked the video, deeming it to be a fabrication. The following November, Filipino politician Teodoro Locsin Jr. encouraged Eleazar to run for senator, stating "I won't wish you luck, Gen. Eleazar; the victory of a man of your quality shouldn't be left to luck. I wish our country luck that you win." Senator Panfilo Lacson also encouraged him to run. The following month, Eleazar encouraged policemen to not engage in politics. After his statement, he announced he would not run, but changed his decision after receiving further encouragement by politicians. He announced his bid on November 14 and officially filed his candidacy the next day, the last day of filing.

Eleazar ran in the 2022 Philippine Senate elections as a Reporma candidate under the Lacson-Sotto senatorial ticket. His candidacy replaced that of radio commentator and PWD advocate Paolo Capino, which was withdrawn on November 12. His platform focused on improving order in the Philippines, stopping corruption, and expanding PNP services.

On February 11, 2022, Mike Velarde of El Shaddai gave his blessing to Eleazar's campaign. The following month, Eleazar was endorsed by the Philippine Association of Detective and Protective Agencies Operators (PADPAO), a professional association of security guards and private investigators, and by the Iglesia ni Cristo community. He lost, gaining 16th place with 11,194,886 votes, accounting 20.28% of the votes.

== See also ==
- List of Chinese Filipinos
- List of Philippine Military Academy alumni

Police appointments
Preceded by PGEN Debold Sinas	Chief of the Philippine National Police	Succeeded by PGEN Dionardo Carlos
