= Dionardo Carlos =

Chief of the Philippine National Police

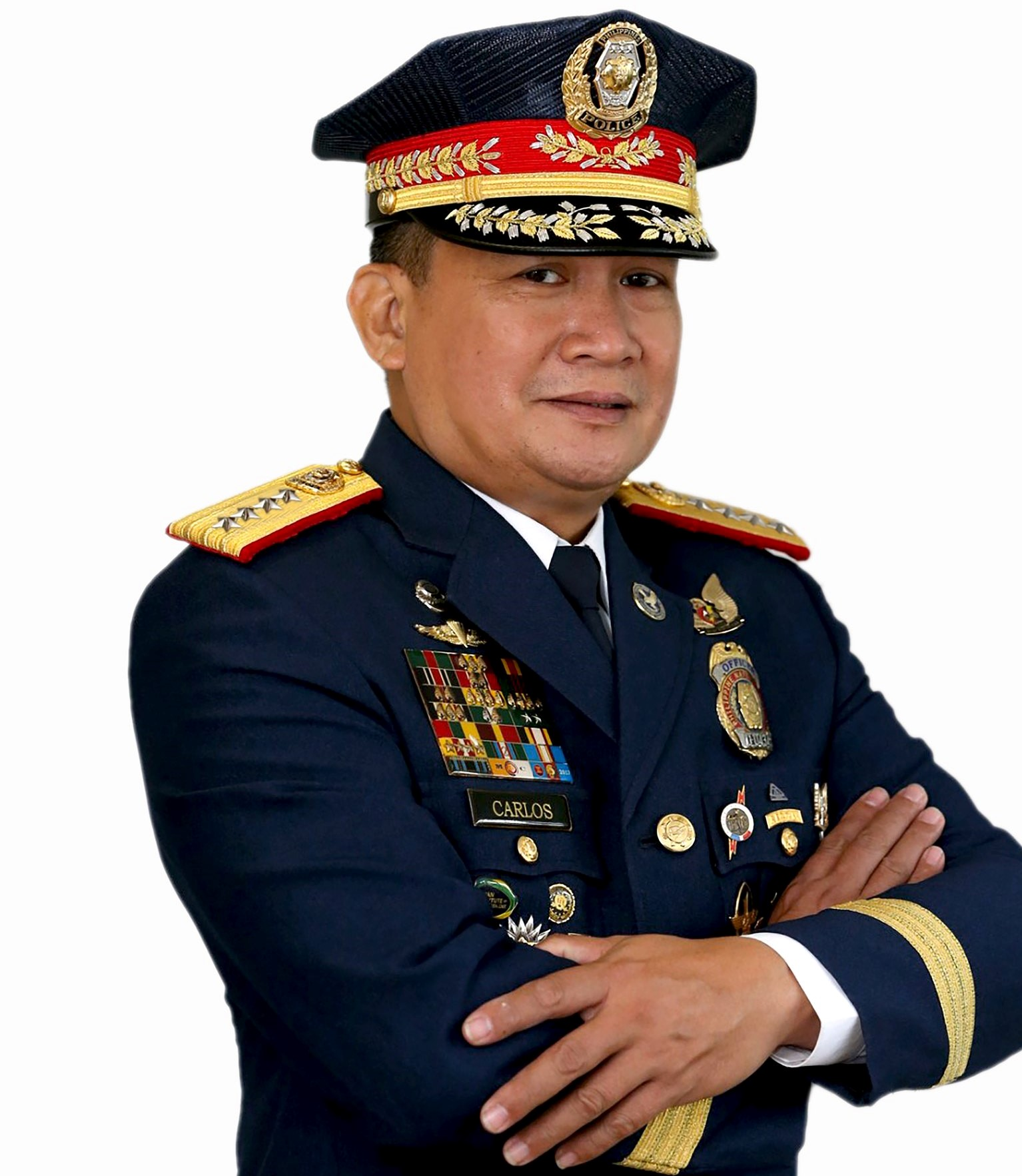

27th Chief of the Philippine National Police
- In office November 13, 2021 – May 8, 2022
- President: Rodrigo Duterte
- Preceded by: Guillermo Eleazar
- Succeeded by: Vicente D. Danao Jr. (OIC)

Chief of Directoral Staff of the Philippine National Police
- In office May 9, 2021 – November 12, 2021
- President: Rodrigo Duterte
- Preceded by: Israel Ephraim Dickson
- Succeeded by: Rhodel Sermonia

Personal details
- Born: Dionardo Bernardo Carlos; May 8, 1966 (age 60) Lucena, Quezon, Philippines
- Spouse: Ana Lorraine Cruz
- Children: 2
- Education: Philippine Military Academy; Asian Institute of Management; Philippine Christian University
- Police career
- Service: Integrated National Police; Philippine National Police
- Division: PNP Public Information Office; PNP AVSEGROUP; PNP HPG; PNP DICTM; PNP DPCR; DIPO Southern Luzon; DIPO Visayas; PNP Directorial Staff
- Police office: Police Regional Office 8 (Eastern Visayas)
- Service years: 1988–2022
- Rank: Police General
- Other work: UNTAC (Cambodia); UNMIT (East Timor)

Dionardo Bernardo Carlos (born May 8, 1966, in Lucena, Philippines) is a Filipino police officer who served as the 27th Chief of the Philippine National Police from November 13, 2021, up to May 8, 2022, after reaching the mandatory retirement age of 56. He was appointed by President Rodrigo Duterte.

== Early life and education ==
Carlos was born on May 8, 1966, in Lucena, Quezon to marine biologist Osmundo Carlos from Tayabas, Quezon and nurse Erlinda Bernardo from Guiuan, Eastern Samar. He spent his childhood in his mother's hometown before moving back to Lucena to begin schooling. Carlos attended the Luzonian University Foundation (now Enverga University) and graduated class salutatorian.

Carlos studied for a year at the University of the Philippines Diliman. In 1984, he entered the Philippine Military Academy, and graduated as part of the Maringal Class of 1988. Carlos also holds Master in Management degrees from the Asian Institute of Management and Philippine Christian University.

== Career ==
After graduating, Carlos was commissioned as a police second lieutenant in the Philippine Constabulary. He was assigned to Camp Guillermo Nakar in Quezon. He worked to combat the New People's Army, a communist insurgent group in the Philippines, and was stationed in Southern Luzon for four years. From 1992 to 1993, he served in the international peacekeeping mission of the United Nations Transitional Authority in Cambodia, as part of the Philippine contingent.

Carlos joined the Special Action Force of the Philippine National Police in 1994, and worked in counter-terrorism and special operations for six years. He returned to international peacekeeping as an officer in the United Nations Integrated Mission in East Timor.

In 2000, Carlos joined as one of its pioneers the newly established Philippine Drug Enforcement Agency, serving as its deputy intelligence chief. He would use this experience and return to the Philippine National Police as part of the now defunct Anti-Illegal Drugs Special Operations Task Force. From 2006 to 2008, Carlos served as City Police Chief of Dumaguete, Negros Oriental.

Throughout his career in law enforcement, Carlos has assumed several key positions within the Philippine National Police, including Director its Aviation Security Group and Highway Patrol Group, and Director for Integrated Police Operations in Visayas and in Southern Luzon. He has also served as the spokesperson of the Philippine National Police.

On May 8, 2021, Carlos was promoted to Chief of Directorial Staff, becoming part of the Philippine National Police Command Group. In November 2021, President Rodrigo Duterte appointed Carlos Chief of the Philippine National Police, the highest ranking position within the police force. He succeeded Police General Guillermo Eleazar on November 12, 2021.

=== Key Positions ===
- Director, PNP Public Information Office/Spokesperson, PNP
- Director, PNP HPG
- Regional Director, Police Regional Office 8
- Director, PNP AVSEGROUP
- Director, Directorate for Information and Communications Technology Management
- Director, Directorate for Police Community Relations
- Director, Directorate for Integrated Police Operations - Visayas
- Director, Directorate for Integrated Police Operations - Southern Luzon
- Chief of Directorial Staff
- Chief, PNP

== Personal life ==
Carlos is married to Ana Lorraine Cruz and has two children, Samuel, and Eliana Nicole. He is the elder brother of Rear Admiral Alberto Carlos, who formerly served as the commander of the Philippine Fleet, under the Philippine Navy. He is also an avid motorcycle rider, rescue diver, and seasoned skydiver.

Police appointments
Preceded by PGEN Guillermo Eleazar	Chief of the Philippine National Police	Succeeded by PLTGEN Vicente Danao (OIC)
