= Debold Sinas =

Former Chief of the Philippine National Police

Undersecretary of the Office of the President of the Philippines
- In office September 11, 2021 – June 30, 2022
- President: Rodrigo Duterte

25th Chief of the Philippine National Police
- In office November 10, 2020 – May 8, 2021
- President: Rodrigo Duterte
- Preceded by: PGen. Camilo Cascolan
- Succeeded by: PGen. Guillermo Eleazar
Previous PNP positions
Regional Director of the National Capital Region Police Office
In office October 16, 2019 – November 10, 2020
President	Rodrigo Duterte
Preceded by	PMGen. Guillermo Eleazar
Succeeded by	PMGen. Vicente Danao
Regional Director of the PNP Police Regional Office 7
In office July 2018 – October 16, 2019
President	Rodrigo Duterte
Preceded by	PCSupt. Robert G. Quenery
Succeeded by	PBGen. Valeriano T. De Leon

Personal details
- Born: Debold Menorias Sinas; May 8, 1965 (age 61) Quezon City, Philippines
- Education: Philippine Military Academy; Philippine Christian University
- Police career
- Service: Philippine National Police
- Allegiance: Philippines
- Divisions: Philippine National Police: National Capital Region Police Office; Police Regional Office 7; PNP Crime Laboratory Group; Police Regional Office 12
- Service years: 1987–2021
- Rank: Police General

Debold Menorias Sinas (born May 8, 1965) is a Filipino retired police general who served as Chief of the Philippine National Police (PNP) from November 2020 to May 2021. During his tenure, he oversaw the COVID-19 community quarantines in the Philippines. However, he was also accused of violating the COVID-19 lockdown rules himself.

Sinas graduated from the Philippine Military Academy (PMA) in 1987. He served as the police chief of Central Visayas and Metro Manila before becoming chief of the PNP. After his retirement, he was appointed as an undersecretary to President Rodrigo Duterte. Since July 2022, he is serving as Cebu City's peace and order adviser.

== Early life and education ==
Debold Menorias Sinas was born on May 8, 1965, in Quezon City, Philippines. However he would spend most of his childhood in Butuan in Mindanao. At the encouragement of his father, he entered the Philippine Military Academy (PMA), and graduated from the institution in 1987 as part of the Hinirang class. (Each year since 1967, the PMA assigns the graduating batch a unique honorific as verbal representation of the collective aspirations of the class. In 1987, the class were called Hinirang - which means "chosen" or "appointed ones"). Sinas told SunStar Cebu in an interview that he joined the academy due to pressure from his father – he was warned that if he did not get in, he would not be accepted back home.

== Career ==
Prior to serving as Central Visayas police chief, Sinas served in the Police Regional Office 12 (PRO-12) as Deputy Regional Director for Administration and in Camp Crame as secretary to the Directorial Staff under the Office of the Chief Directorial Staff and later, director of the PNP Crime Laboratory. He was promoted to Police Chief Superintendent in April 2017.

=== Key Positions ===
- Deputy Director for Administration, Police Regional Office 12
- Secretary to the Directorial Staff, PNP NHQ
- Director, PNP Crime Laboratory Group
- Regional Director, Police Regional Office 7
- Regional Director, NCRPO
- Chief, PNP

=== Central Visayas chief ===
Sinas was police chief of the Philippine National Police's Police Regional Office 7 (PRO-7), which had jurisdiction over Central Visayas, for one year and four months. He worked under the office from July 2018 to October 2019. During his term at this post, Negros Oriental, a province under his jurisdiction, was the subject of intense scrutiny due to the 2017–19 Negros Island killings which led to Sinas appearing at an August 2019 Senate hearing to explain the increased number of killings in the province. The Senate investigation determined that the police and military carried out most of the killings as part of its counter-insurgency operations against the communist New People's Army, along with armed vigilante groups that targeted suspected communists and leftists.

=== Metro Manila chief ===
Sinas was reassigned to Metro Manila in October 2019. His appointment as chief of the National Capital Region Police Office (NCRPO) was announced on October 10, 2019. and formally assumed the position on October 16, vowing to tackle illegal drugs, bribery, and gambling in Metro Manila. He succeeded Guillermo Eleazar, who was appointed as chief of the PNP Directorial Staff.

By November 2019, 143 police officers from Central Visayas were reassigned to Metro Manila police office. One of the transferred personnel was assigned as the office's intelligence officer, though Sinas did not enact other leadership changes at the time.

Sinas launched a biometrics system for the NCRPO on December 2, 2019, for accurate attendance monitoring of the police office's personnel.

=== Philippine National Police chief ===
On November 9, 2020, President Rodrigo Duterte announced that Sinas would be the next chief of Philippine National Police after the retirement of PNP Chief Camilo Cascolan. Sinas' tenure began the following day.

On May 8, 2021, Sinas celebrated his 56th birthday – the mandatory retirement age of police officers in the Philippines. Sinas' 6-month watch as top cop was marred with controversies. He was succeeded by Lt. Gen. Guillermo Eleazar as Philippine National Police chief.

=== Post-police career ===
On September 11, 2021, Executive Secretary Salvador Medialdea announced that Sinas was appointed undersecretary of the Office of the President.

On July 4, 2022, Cebu City mayor Mike Rama appointed Sinas to the Cebu City Advisory Board. He is to specialize on peace and order concerns.

== Family and personal life ==
Sinas' father was a military officer born in Butuan, in the Caraga region of Mindanao island. Sinas' father had died before he graduated from the Philippine Military Academy in 1987. He mentioned in an interview that he "pushed [himself] to really graduate [from the PMA] as a promise to [his] father". Sinas has two children. He also mentioned in the same interview that his mother and widowed sister were living with his children.

=== Voltes V ===
Sinas' favorite show growing up was the Japanese anime television series, Voltes V. The show's theme song, "Voltes V no Uta" ("The Song of Voltes V"), has become a trademark for Sinas. The Police Regional Office in Central Visayas (PRO-7 where Sinas worked during 2018 to 2019) would play the theme song during ceremonies in the headquarters and even during police operations. When asked why the anime show was his favorite, Sinas said that "it embodied teamwork". During his stint as National Capital Region Police Office (NCRPO) Director (2019–2020), Sinas once again used the concept of Voltes V in terms of the different stakeholders—such as the police, the community, and government— "volting in" to achieve one goal.

On November 9, 2020, "NCRPO Fitness Team", a YouTube channel run by the National Capital Region Police office (NCRPO) where Sinas was stationed for almost a year in 2019–2020, uploaded a video featuring Sinas leading a four-minute workout routine to the Voltes V theme song.

== Controversies and criticism ==
=== COVID-19 pandemic ===
==== Mañanita celebration ====
Sinas oversaw police response to the COVID-19 pandemic in Metro Manila, one of the hardest hit regions of the pandemic. However, his stint as Metro Manila chief was marred by a controversy over the holding of a mañanita — an early morning birthday serenade — for his birthday on May 8, 2020, at Camp Bagong Diwa. A mañanita is a tradition in the Philippine police force where personnel greet their senior officers during the early morning for their birthdays. The gathering was perceived negatively by the public, with the leadership of the Philippine National Police filing charges against Sinas and 18 other officers for violation of the Bayanihan to Heal as One Act, particularly on provisions concerning social distancing and mass gathering at the time. Although Sinas keeps his post due to the "emergency situation" concerning the pandemic, the police agency was concerned that his programs related to COVID-19 response might be disrupted. Sinas apologized for the event though he insisted that his office observed appropriate protocols. On May 20, President Rodrigo Duterte decided against dismissing Sinas or transferring him to another post, vouching for his character believing that he was not at fault for being "serenaded" during his birthday.

==== Bypassing of Oriental Mindoro health protocol ====
Debold Sinas tested positive for COVID-19. The PNP made the announcement on March 11, 2021 on the day of his visit to Oriental Mindoro to attend a ceremonial COVID-19 vaccination for the local police force. A statement by the Oriental Mindoro provincial government said that Sinas did not go through the proper health screening since he entered Calapan via helicopter instead of entering the city through its seaport where passengers are screened for the disease.

=== Harassment accusation ===
On July 18, 2020, Sinas and other armed NCRPO officials were accused of harassment by the Delos Santos family, with the incident being filmed by a CCTV camera and the footage going viral online. The NCRPO were allegedly trying to evict the Delos Santos family from the property to build a quarantine facility for COVID-19 patients. Sinas explained that the property is owned by the PNP and Executive Master Sergeant Arnel Delos Santos was only allowed to live there temporarily with an agreement to vacate the property after his retirement in November 2018.
