= Philippine National Police Aviation Security Group =

National Security Aviation Group in the Philippines

Aviation Security Group
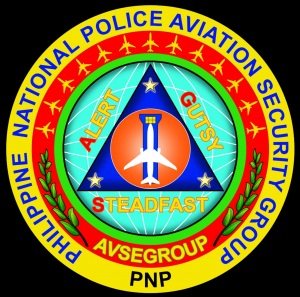
- Unit Seal of the PNP Aviation Security Group
- Common name: Aviation Security Group
- Abbreviation: AVSEGROUP

Agency overview
- Formed: 1976
- Preceding agency: PAF Aviation Security Command (1976–1991)

Jurisdictional structure
- Operations jurisdiction: Philippines

Operational structure
- Headquarters: Crash Gate 1, C-5 Extension corner West Service Road, NAIA Complex, Merville, Pasay
- Agency executives: PBGEN Christopher M. Abecia, Director; PCOL Melvin G. Napiloy, Deputy Director for Administration; PCOL Ranser Avancy Evasco, Deputy Director for Operations; PCOL Joel L. de Mesa, Chief of Staff
- Parent agency: Philippine National Police

Website
- https://avsegroup.pnp.gov.ph/

The Philippine National Police Aviation Security Group (PNP-AVSEGROUP) is responsible for enforcing laws and regulations related to air travel in the Philippines. In the past, their duties were performed by the Aviation Security Command (AVSECOM), formed in 1976. The security group was later renamed in 1986 to Philippine Air Force Security Command (PAFSECOM).

PNP-AVSEGROUP was formed following the passage of Department of the Interior and Local Government Act of 1990 (Republic Act 6975) to counter acts of terrorism that threaten civil aviation in the Philippines.

== History ==
In response to the invitation of the United States Government, representatives from the 54 nations met at Chicago to "make arrangements for the immediate establishment of provisional world air routes and services" and "to set up an interim council to collect record and study data concerning international aviation and to make recommendations for its improvement."

The Conference also discusses the principles and methods to be followed in the adoption of a new aviation convention."

The Convention on International Civil Aviation (also known as Chicago Convention), is later signed by 52 States at the end of the Chicago Conference in the Grand Ballroom of the Stevens Hotel on December 7, 1944, establishing the Provisional International Civil Aviation Organization (PICAO) pending ratification from the 26 States.

On March 5, 1947, the ratification from the 26 States was received and on April 4, 1947, the International Civil Aviation Organization (ICAO) came into force.

In October 1947, the ICAO became a specialized agency of the United Nations linked to Economic and Social Council (ECOSOC).

On December 16, 1970, the convention for the suppression of unlawful seizure of aircraft took place at the Hague, Netherlands by which the contracting states agreed to prohibits and punish aircraft hijacking. It came into effect on October 14, 1971, after it was ratified by 10 states.

On September 23, 1971, the convention for the suppression of unlawful acts against the safety of civil aviation took place at Montreal, Canada which the contracting states agreed to prohibit and punish behavior which may threaten the safety of civil aviation and came into effect on January 26, 1973, after it was ratified by 10 states.

On June 19, 1971, the Philippine Congress enacted RA 6235 known as the anti-hijacking law. An act that prohibits certain acts inimical to civil aviation, making it unlawful for any person to compel a change in the course of an aircraft of Philippine registry or seize, or usurp the control thereof while it is in flight.

On April 28, 1976, the Philippine gov’t issued presidential letter of instruction nr. 399 creating the national action Committee on anti-hijacking or the NACAH, with the secretary of the national defense as chairman and seven other agencies as members.

On June 1, 1976, the Armed Forces of the Philippines-Aviation Security Command or the AVSECOM was organized as the implementing arm of NACAH with the primary mission of ensuring the continuous and uninterrupted operation of civil aviation industry in the country.

On March 1, 1986, AVSECOM was later renamed as the Philippine Air Force Security Command or PAFSECOM by virtue of Headquarters, AFP General Orders number 37.

On December 31, 1990, with the enactment of RA 6975, otherwise known as an act establishing the PNP under a reorganized Department of Interior and Local Government (DILG). The chairmanship of NACAH was transferred from DND to the DILG. The mission and functions of the defunct PAFSECOM was transferred to the PNP.

On July 1, 1991, the PNP assumed the responsibility of ensuring the uninterrupted and secured operation of the civil aviation industry in the country thru the Police Aviation Security Command or PASCOM which was later renamed as the PNP-Aviation Security Group with its acronym PNP-ASG by virtue of General Hqs PNP Memorandum Circular Number 96-01 dated September 12, 1996.

The National Hqs, PNP amended the acronym PNP-ASG to PNP-AVSEGROUP pursuant to General Orders number 07-09 dated August 6, 2007.
