= Independent Commission for Infrastructure =

Three-member ad hoc fact-finding commission in the Philippines

Agency overview
- Formed: September 11, 2025
- Dissolved: March 31, 2026
- Type: Ad hoc fact-finding commission
- Jurisdiction: Philippines
- Headquarters: Energy Center, Rizal Drive, Bonifacio Global City, Taguig, Philippines
- Agency executives: Andres Reyes Jr., Chairperson; Brian Keith Hosaka, Executive Director; Rodolfo Azurin Jr., Special Adviser and Investigator
- Parent department: Office of the President

The Independent Commission for Infrastructure (ICI) was a five-member ad hoc fact-finding commission in the Philippines tasked with investigating flood control and other infrastructure projects implemented from 2015 onwards. It was established on September 11, 2025, through Executive Order No. 94.

The commissioners took their oath of office before Court of Appeals Justice Pedro Corales on September 15, 2025, formally commencing their tenure. The commission was supported by a secretariat that provides technical and administrative assistance, headed by an executive director with the rank of undersecretary under the direct supervision of the ICI chairperson.

On March 13, 2026, it was announced that the ICI will cease operations on March 31, 2026, following Chairman Andres Reyes Jr.’s declaration that the body has successfully fulfilled its mandate to investigate national infrastructure anomalies. The commission has turned over all evidences to the Office of the Ombudsman and the Department of Justice.

== Background ==
President Bongbong Marcos stated that the commission would operate independently and would not include politicians, as its investigation is primarily technical in nature. The ICI serves as an "investigative arm" of the administration, tasked with reviewing tips and complaints regarding flood control and infrastructure projects.

Its creation followed public concerns about alleged corruption in Department of Public Works and Highways (DPWH) projects, including flood-control initiatives. The establishment of the ICI is part of Marcos' broader anti-corruption campaign, which he highlighted during his fourth State of the Nation Address in July 2025 and in subsequent congressional inquiries.

== Mandate and powers ==
The ICI was authorized to:

- Investigate flood control and other infrastructure projects implemented in the last decade.
- Issue subpoenas to compel government officials or private individuals to provide documents or testimony.
- Recommend to the Department of Justice (DOJ) the admission of witnesses into the Witness Protection, Security, and Benefit Program.
- Recommend to the Executive the filing of complaints with the Office of the Ombudsman or DOJ based on its findings.

Failure to comply with the commission's directives may result in administrative or criminal liability, depending on whether the individual is a government official or a private citizen.

== Composition ==
The commission was composed of the following members:

| Position | Portrait | Name | Since | Background |
|---|---|---|---|---|
| Chairperson | | Andres Reyes Jr. | September 15, 2025 | Former associate justice of the Supreme Court of the Philippines; With an extensive judicial career |
| Executive Director | | Brian Keith Hosaka | September 24, 2025 | Lawyer; Former Supreme Court spokesperson; Former Commissioner of the Governance Commission for GOCCs |
| Special Adviser | | Rodolfo Azurin Jr. | October 13, 2025 | Former chief of the Philippine National Police |

=== Former members ===
| Position | Portrait | Name | Tenure | Background |
|---|---|---|---|---|
| Special Adviser | | Benjamin Magalong | September 15, 2025 – September 26, 2025 | Mayor of Baguio; Former director of the Criminal Investigation and Detection Group |
| Member | | Rogelio Singson | September 15, 2025 – December 15, 2025 | Former secretary of the Department of Public Works and Highways; Chair of the Bases Conversion and Development Authority; With experience in public and private infrastructure projects |
| Member | | Rossana Fajardo | September 15, 2025 – December 31, 2025 | Country managing partner of SyCip Gorres Velayo & Co.; With extensive experience as a public accountant, auditor, and fraud examiner |

== See also ==
- Corruption in the Philippines
