= Opinion polling for the 2028 Philippine presidential election =

This article covers opinion polling for the 2028 Philippine presidential and vice presidential elections. Opinion polling in Philippines is conducted by Social Weather Stations (SWS), Pulse Asia, OCTA Research, and other pollsters. Poll results are listed in the table below in reverse chronological order. The front-runner is in bold. Those that are within the margin of error are in italics.

== Polling for president ==
=== Before candidacy filing ends in October 2027 ===
Graphical summary of the 2028 Philippine presidential election polling

Fieldwork date(s)	Pollster	Sample size	MoE	Angara (LDP)	Aquino (KANP)	Belmonte (SBP)	Dizon (Ind.)	R. Duterte (PDP)	S. Duterte (HNP)	Escudero (NPC)	Gatchalian (NPC)	Go (PDP)	Hontiveros (Akbayan)	Magalong (NPC)	B. Marcos (PFP)	I. Marcos (NP)	S. Marcos (PFP)	Moreno (Aksyon)	Pacquiao (PROMDI)	Padilla (PDP)	Pangilinan (LP)	Poe (Ind.)	Remulla (NUP)	Robredo (LP)	Romualdez (Lakas)	Teodoro (PRP)	Torre (Ind.)	R. Tulfo (Ind.)	Others	Und./ Ref.
2027
October 1–8	Filing of certificates of candidacies																													
2026
Sep 17–24	Pulse Asia	2,400	±4.0%	–	–	–	1	–	**50**	–	–	–	3	0.3	–	–	–	–	–	–	–	–	–	26	–	1	–	12	0.2	7
May 7–9	Pulse Asia	1,500	±2.5%	–	0.05	–	–	–	**51**	–	–	–	–	–	–	–	–	–	–	–	–	–	–	41	–	–	–	0.03	0.05	8
Mar 19–25	OCTA Research	1,200	±3.0%	–	4	–	–	–	**33**	–	–	–	–	–	–	–	–	10	–	–	–	–	–	21	–	–	–	9	20	3
Mar 10–17	WR Numero	1,455	±3.0%	0.7	3.2	0.4	0.1	–	**35.9**	–	–	3.6	0.7	–	–	–	–	–	–	–	1.4	–	0.3	18.5	–	–	0.0	13.3	–	19.4
Feb 19–20	Tangere	1,200	±2.77%	–	–	–	–	–	**43**	–	–	–	3	–	–	–	–	–	–	–	–	–	–	27	–	–	–	15	–	12
2025
Nov 21–28	WR Numero	1,412	±3.0%	–	2	–	–	–	**33.3**	–	–	4	2.4	0.5	–	–	–	–	–	3.3	1.6	3.3	0.3	13	0.8	–	–	13.3	–	22.2
Jul 29–Aug 6	WR Numero	1,418	–	–	3.1	–	–	–	**31.4**	1.3	0.1	6.5	1.4	–	–	4.4	–	–	1.0	2.0	–	2.1	–	13.3	0.7	–	–	10.3	1.7	5
Mar 31–Apr 7	WR Numero	1,834	±2.0%	–	–	–	–	–	**30.2**	–	–	4.0	2.3	–	–	3.8	–	–	2.1	1.7	–	4.7	–	12.7	0.5	–	–	17.9	2.8	17.5
Feb 10–18	WR Numero	1,814	±2.0%	–	–	–	–	–	**29.1**	–	–	–	1.1	–	–	2.8	–	–	4.1	1.9	–	3.8	–	12.4	1.2	–	–	19.3	2.8	22.6
2024
Sep 5–23	WR Numero	1,729	±2.0%	–	–	–	–	–	24	–	–	–	4	–	–	5	–	–	4	3	–	5	–	9	1	–	–	24	–	18
Jun 25–30	Oculum	1,200	±3.0%	–	–	–	–	–	**25.4**	–	–	–	2.9	–	–	5.7	–	4.8	3.1	2.6	–	–	–	10.6	0.8	–	–	18.5	0.8	20.4
Mar 6–10	Pulse Asia	–	–	–	–	–	–	0.2	34	–	–	–	1	–	–	5	–	0.1	3	2	–	–	–	11	0.5	–	–	**35**	0.2	7
Feb 21–29	Oculum	3,000	±2.0%	–	–	–	–	–	**42**	–	–	–	–	–	–	4	–	4	4	2	–	–	–	10	0.4	–	–	17	2	14
2023
Nov 24–Dec 24	WR Numero	1,500	–	–	–	–	–	–	**36**	–	–	–	1	–	–	7	–	–	5	5	–	–	–	9	1	–	–	23	–	14
Apr 15–18	SWS	1,200	±3.0%	–	–	–	–	3	**28**	–	–	–	–	1	–	1	1	1	2	1	–	–	–	6	–	–	–	11	4	41

== Polling for vice president ==
=== Before candidacy filing ends in October 2027 ===
Fieldwork date(s)	Pollster	Sample size	MoE	Angara (LDP)	Aquino (KANP)	Dizon (Ind.)	Escudero (NPC)	Gatchalian (NPC)	Go (PDP)	Hontiveros (Akbayan)	Magalong (NPC)	Marcoleta (Ind.)	B. Marcos (PFP)	I. Marcos (Nacionalista)	Moreno (Aksyon)	Pacquiao (PROMDI)	Padilla (PDP)	Pangilinan (LP)	Poe (Ind.)	Robredo (LP)	Romualdez (Lakas)	Teodoro (PRP)	Torre (Ind.)	Tulfo (Ind.)	Villar (Nacionalista)	Zubiri (Ind.)	Others	Und./ Ref.
2027
October 1–8					Filing of certificates of candidacies																							
2026
Sep 17–24	Pulse Asia	2,400	–	–	17	–	–	–	**31**	–	–	–	–	–	–	–	19	3	14	–	–	–	0.3	10	–	–	0.5	5
Mar 10–17	WR Numero	1,455	±3.0%	0.5	1.9	0.6	5	0.7	**12.2**	5.9	0.4	8.4	3.6	1.9	3.5	–	11.7	–	5	11.9	–	–	0.0	–	–	–	–	26.8
Feb 19–Feb 20	Tangere	1,200	±2.77%	–	21	–	–	–	**27**	–	–	–	–	–	–	–	10	–	–	–	–	–	–	13	–	–	4	15
2025
Nov 21–28	WR Numero	1,412	±3.0%	0.3	7.2	0.2	2.6	1.2	**19.1**	2.8	1.7	–	–	4.3	6.8	–	8.5	–	8.4	–	–	–	–	–	1.2	–	–	30.6
Jul 29–Aug 6	WR Numero	1,418	–	–	14.9	–	5.9	0.4	**16.2**	4.3	–	–	–	4.5	–	1.8	7.7	–	6.8	–	1.4	–	8.4	–	–	–	0.3	5.5
Mar 31–Apr 7	WR Numero	1,834	±2.0%	–	–	–	–	–	–	–	–	–	–	7.4	–	5.2	8.4	–	**18.4**	11.61	1.4	1.6	–	–	–	3	7.7	30.7
Feb 10–18	WR Numero	1,814	±2.0%	–	–	–	–	–	–	–	–	–	–	7.0	–	9.7	8.3	–	**15.6**	13.5	1.1	2.8	–	–	–	3.3	6.2	33
2024
Sep 5–23	WR Numero	1,729	±2.0%	–	–	–	–	–	–	–	–	–	–	8	–	8	9	–	**20**	14	3	3	–	–	–	4	–	27
Mar 6–10	Pulse Asia	–	–	–	–	–	–	–	0.3	0.05	–	–	–	16	–	14	14	–	**35**	–	1	4	–	0.5	–	7	1	8
2023
Nov 24–Dec 24	WR Numero	1,457	–	–	–	–	–	–	–	–	–	–	–	15	–	11	11	–	**22**	9	2	4	–	–	–	6	–	21
