= Benjamin Acorda Jr. =

Chief of the Philippine National Police

Benjamin C. Acorda Jr.
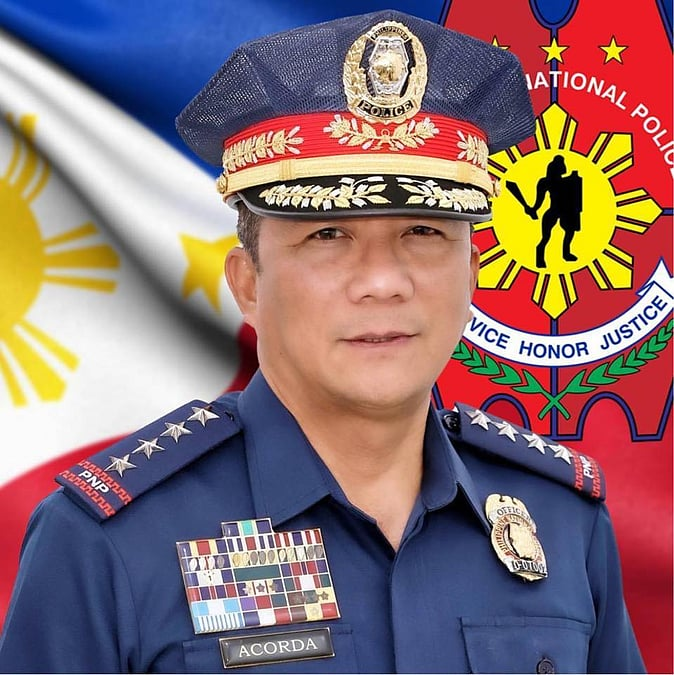
- Official portrait, 2023

Executive Director of the Presidential Anti-Organized Crime Commission
- Incumbent
- Assumed office October 15, 2025
- President: Ferdinand R. Marcos Jr.
- Preceded by: Usec. Gilberto D.C. Cruz

29th Chief of the Philippine National Police
- In office April 24, 2023 – March 31, 2024
- President: Ferdinand R. Marcos Jr.
- Preceded by: PGen. Rodolfo S. Azurin Jr.
- Succeeded by: PLtGen. Emmanuel B. Peralta (OIC)

Personal details
- Born: Benjamin Casuga Acorda; December 3, 1967 (age 58) Bacarra, Ilocos Norte
- Party: PolPHIL (2024–present)
- Education: Philippine Military Academy; Philippine Christian University (M. A.)
- Police career
- Service: Philippine National Police
- Divisions: Directorate for Intelligence; Civil Security Group; Integrity Monitoring and Enforcement Group; Anti-Cybercrime Group
- Police offices: Northern Mindanao PRO; Palawan PPO
- Service years: 1991–2024
- Rank: Police General
- Badge no.: 0-07002

Benjamin "Benjie" Casuga Acorda Jr. (born December 4, 1967) is a retired Filipino police officer who served as the 29th Chief of the Philippine National Police from April 24, 2023 until his extended forced retirement on March 31, 2024. He is currently the Executive Director of the Presidential Anti-Organized Crime Commission.

== Career ==
Acorda oversaw the Pangasinan municipal police stations in Sual, Sison, Bolinao, and Balungao, which are all in the Ilocos area. Later, he was assigned to the provincial police of Palawan, where he worked from 2014 to 2016.

Acorda led the Palawan Police Provincial Office to be the most efficient police force in the MIMAROPA region. He also led the CIDG's CAMANAVA Criminal Investigation and Detection Team. He also led the CIDG's Anti-Fraud and Commercial Crimes Division and its MIMAROPA unit. He was also the Deputy Chief of Operations for CIDG in 2010.

In 2008, Acorda went back to his native area where he worked as an intel officer, and later as assistant director for operations of the Ilocos Norte provincial police, and later, director of its Operations and Plans' Branch. In addition, he served as the chief of the police intelligence division for the Ilocos Region's production department and the police intelligence branch for Ilocos Norte.

He was assigned to the National Capital Region Police Office (NCRPO), and led such positions like deputy director for operations, deputy director for administration and its regional intelligence division.

Additionally, he worked for the Mindanao police in a variety of roles. He was employed by Muslim Mindanao's Bangsamoro Autonomous Region in Basilan as an intelligence and operations officer. Later on, Acorda held the position of regional police director for Northern Mindanao.

Acorda led the PNP Integrity Monitoring and Enforcement Group and the Civil Security Group before joining the PNP Anti-Cybercrime Group as one of its founding members. Before being named the country's top law enforcement official, he was in charge of the PNP's Directorate for Intelligence.

Acorda has held directorial positions in UN missions and overseen law enforcement officers from foreign countries, and he is also a former member of the United Nations Blue Helmets.

Additionally, he has been awarded the Bronze Cross Model, a distinguished title bestowed upon police enforcement personnel

He was appointed as the Chief of the Philippine National Police on April 24, 2023, term as chief was extended until March 31, 2024.

=== Key Positions ===
- Provincial Director, Palawan Police Provincial Office
- Director, PNP Integrity Monitoring and Enforcement Group
- Regional Director, Police Regional Office 10
- Director, PNP Anti-Cybercrime Group
- Director, PNP Civil Security Group
- Director, Directorate for Intelligence
- Chief, PNP

== Personal life ==
Benjamin Sr., a lawyer from La Union who worked as an enlisted Air Force member and as counsel for the La Union's Citizen's Legal Assistance Office (now called the Public Attorney's Office).

Purificacion Casuga-Acorda, Acorda's mother, was employed in La Union as a government nurse.

Acorda attended the Philippine Christian University where he studied for his master's degree in management.

Police appointments
Preceded by PGEN Rodolfo Azurin Jr.	Chief of the Philippine National Police	Succeeded by PGEN Rommel Francisco Marbil
