= Government-owned and controlled corporation =

State-owned enterprise in the Philippines

In the Philippines, a government-owned and controlled corporation (GOCC; Filipino: korporasyong pag-aari at kontrolado ng pamahalaan), sometimes with an "and/or", is a state-owned enterprise (SOE) that conducts both commercial and non-commercial activity. Examples of the latter would be the Government Service Insurance System (GSIS), a social security system for government employees. There are 219 GOCCs as of 2022. GOCCs both receive subsidies and pay dividends to the national government. A government-owned or controlled corporation is a stock or a non-stock corporation, whether performing governmental or proprietary functions, which is directly chartered by a special law or if organized under the general corporation law is owned or controlled by the government directly, or indirectly through a parent corporation or subsidiary corporation, to the extent of at least a majority of its outstanding capital stock or of its outstanding voting capital stock.

Under the GOCC Governance Act (Republic Act No. 10149), GOCCs are overseen by the Governance Commission for GOCCs (GCG). The Governance Commission is the "government's central advisory and oversight body over the public corporate sector" according to the Official Gazette. The GCG, among other duties, prepares for the President a shortlist of candidates for appointment to GOCC boards.

Many, but not all, GOCCs have their own charter or law outlining its responsibilities and governance.

== Finances ==
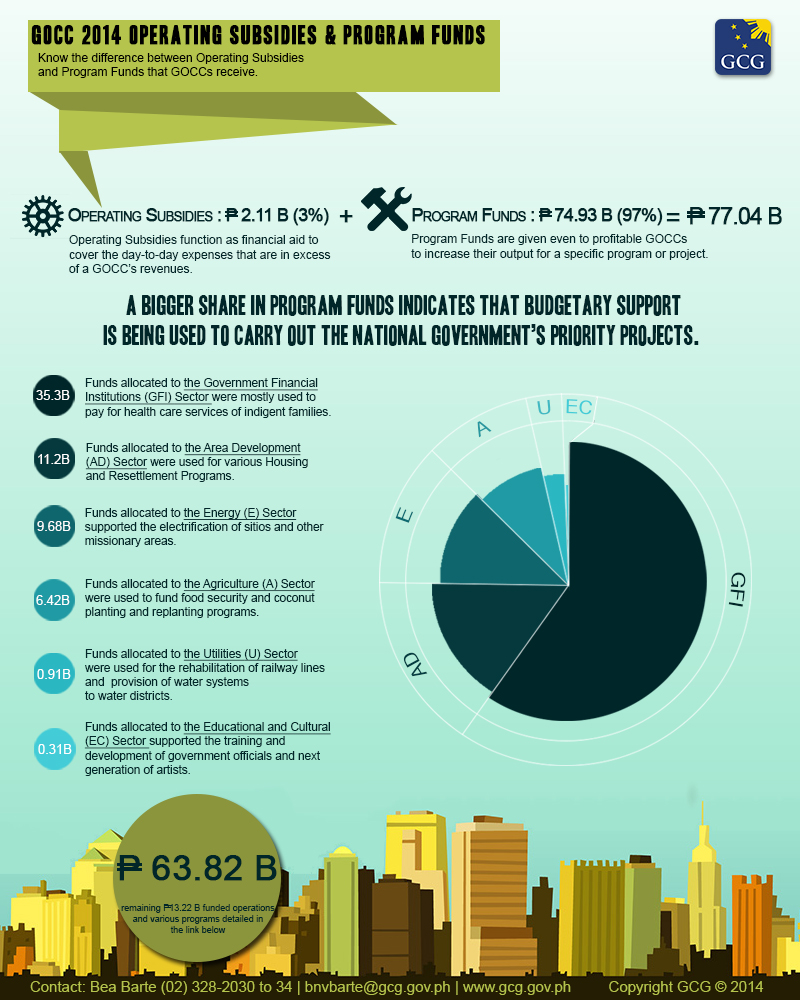
2014 operation subsidies and program funds that GOCCs received from the national government

GOCCs receive from the government "subsidies" and "program funds". Subsidies cover the day-to-day operations of the GOCCs when revenues are insufficient while program funds are given to profitable GOCCs to pay for a specific program or project.

Subsidies from the national government in 2011 amounted to ₱21 billion. In the 2013 fiscal year, the national government gave ₱71.9 billion pesos to GOCCs in subsidies, nearly twice the ₱44.7 billion programmed into the budget. In 2014, ₱77.04 billion was spent on GOCCs by the national government, 3% of which was classified as subsidies and 97% was classified as program funds.

In 2013, on "GOCC Dividend Day", the Philippine government received ₱28 billion in dividends and other forms of remittances from the 2012 operations of 38 GOCCs. Eight GOCCs remitted ₱1 billion each: Philippine Reclamation Authority (PRA, ₱1 billion pesos); Philippine Ports Authority (PPA, ₱1.03 billion); Manila International Airport Authority (MIAA, ₱1.54 billion); Philippine Amusement and Gaming Corporation (PAGCOR, ₱P7.18 billion); Power Sector Assets and Liabilities Management Corporation (PSALM, ₱2 billion); Bases Conversion Development Authority (BCDA, ₱2.30 billion); Development Bank of the Philippines (DBP, ₱3.16 billion); and Land Bank of the Philippines (LBP, ₱6.24 billion). Under Republic Act No. 7656, all GOCCs are required to "declare and remit at least 50% of their annual net earnings as cash, stock or property dividends to the National Government." The Commission on Audit reports that in 2013 of the 219 profitable GOCCs, only 45 remitted a full 50% share of their dividends to the national treasury, leaving 174 others with unremitted government shares, amounting to more than ₱50 billion. Dividends remitted were only one-tenth (1/10) of the total required by law according to the commission.

In 2014, on "GOCC Dividend Day", the Philippine government received ₱32.31 billion worth of dividends and other remittances from 50 GOCCs. Seven GOCCs submitted over ₱1 billion each: Development Bank of the Philippines (DBP) with ₱3.616 billion; Power Sector Assets and Liabilities Management Corporation (PSALM) with ₱2.5 billion; Bases Conversion Development Authority (BCDA) with ₱2.107 billion; Manila International Airport Authority (MIAA) with ₱1.577 billion; Philippine National Oil Company-Exploration Corporation (PNOC-EC) with ₱1.5 billion; Philippine Ports Authority (PPA) with ₱1.422 billion; and Philippine Deposit Insurance Corporation (PDIC) with ₱1.05 billion.

== List ==
List adapted from the Governance Commission for GOCCs' Integrated Corporate Reporting System's list as of June 30, 2026.

=== Government Financial Institutions Sector ===
==== Banking institutions ====
- Al-Amanah Islamic Investment Bank of the Philippines (AIIBP)
- Development Bank of the Philippines (DBP)
- DBP Data Center, Inc. (DCI)
- Land Bank of the Philippines (LBP)
- Land Bank Countryside Development Foundation, Inc. (LCDFI)
- LBP Resources and Development Corporation (LBRDC)
- Overseas Filipino Bank (OFBank) (Note: formerly PostBank)

==== Non-banking institutions ====
- Credit Information Corporation (CIC)
- DBP Leasing Corporation (DBP-LC)
- LBP Insurance Brokerage, Inc. (LIBI)
- LBP Leasing and Finance Corporation (LLFC)
- Maharlika Wealth Fund (MIC)
- National Development Company (NDC)
- National Home Mortgage Finance Corporation (NHMFC)
- Philippine Crop Insurance Corporation (PCIC)
- Philippine Deposit Insurance Corporation (PDIC)
- Small Business Corporation (SBCorp)
- Social Housing Finance Corporation (SHFC)
- Philippine Guarantee Corporation (PHILGUARANTEE)
- Landbank Securities, Inc. (LSI)

==== Social security institutions ====
- Employees Compensation Commission (ECC)
- Government Service Insurance System (GSIS)
- Home Development Mutual Fund (Pag-IBIG Fund)
- Philippine Health Insurance Corporation (PhilHealth)
- Social Security System (SSS)
- Veterans Federation of the Philippines (VFP)

=== Trade, Area Development, and Tourism Sector ===
==== Trade ====
- Center for International Trade Expositions and Missions (CITEM)
- Duty Free Philippines Corporation (DFPC)
- Philippine International Trading Corporation (PITC)
- Philippine Pharma Procurement, Inc. (PPPI)
- National Food Authority (NFA)
- Planters Products, Inc. (PPI)
- Planters Foundation, Inc. (PFI)

==== Area development ====
- Bases Conversion and Development Authority (BCDA)
- Clark Development Corporation (CDC)
- John Hay Management Corporation (JHMC)
- Laguna Lake Development Authority (LLDA)
- National Housing Authority (NHA)
- Palacio del Gobernador Condominium Corporation (PDGCC)
- Philippine Reclamation Authority (PRA)
- Poro Point Management Corporation (PPMC)
- Quezon City Development Authority (QCDA)
- Southern Philippines Development Authority (SPDA)
- Tourism Infrastructure and Enterprise Zone Authority (TIEZA)
- PHIVIDEC Industrial Authority (PIA)

==== Tourism ====
- Marawi Resort Hotel, Inc. (MRHI)
- Philippine Retirement Authority (PRA)
- Tourism Promotions Board (TPB)

=== Educational and Cultural Sector ===
==== Educational ====
- Boy Scouts of the Philippines (BSP)
- Girl Scouts of the Philippines (GSP)
- Philippine Tax Academy (PTA)

==== Cultural ====
- Cultural Center of the Philippines (CCP)
- Nayong Pilipino Foundation, Inc. (NPF)

=== Gaming Sector ===
- Philippine Amusement and Gaming Corporation (PAGCOR)
- Philippine Charity Sweepstakes Office (PCSO)

=== Energy and Materials Sector ===
==== Energy ====
- National Electrification Administration (NEA)
- National Power Corporation (NPC)
- National Transmission Corporation (TRANSCO)
- Philippine National Oil Company (PNOC)
- Power Sector Assets and Liabilities Management Corporation (PSALM)
- PNOC Exploration Corporation (PNOC-EC)

==== Materials ====
- Bukidnon Forest, Inc. (BFI)
- Natural Resources Development Corporation (NRDC)
- Philippine Mining Development Corporation (PMDC) (Note: formerly NRMDC)

=== Agriculture, Fisheries, and Food Sector ===
==== Agriculture and Fisheries ====
- National Dairy Authority (NDA)
- National Tobacco Administration (NTA)
- Philippine Coconut Authority (PCA)
- Philippine Fisheries Development Authority (PFDA)
- Sugar Regulatory Administration (SRA)

==== Food ====
- Food Terminal Inc. (FTI) (Note: under the Privatization and Management Office of the Department of Finance)
- Legaspi Oil Company, Inc. (LEGOIL)
- Granexport Manufacturing Corporation (Granex)
- San Pablo Manufacturing Corporation (SPMC)
- Cagayan de Oro Oil Company, Inc. (CAGOIL)
- Southern Luzon Coconut Oil Mill, Inc. (SOLCOM)
- Iligan Coconut Industries, Inc. (ILICOCO)

=== Utilities and Communications Sector ===
==== Utilities ====
- Cebu Port Authority (CPA)
- Civil Aviation Authority of the Philippines (CAAP)
- Clark International Airport Corporation (CIAC)
- Light Rail Transit Authority (LRTA)
- Local Water Utilities Administration (LWUA)
- Mactan–Cebu International Airport Authority (MCIAA)
- Manila International Airport Authority (MIAA)
- Metropolitan Waterworks and Sewerage System – Corporate Office (MWSS-CO)
- Metropolitan Waterworks and Sewerage System – Regulatory Office (MWSS-RO)
- National Irrigation Administration (NIA)
- PEA Tollway Corporation (PEA-TC)
- Philippine National Construction Corporation (PNCC)
- Philippine National Railways (PNR)
- Philippine Ports Authority (PPA)
- Davao International Airport Authority (DIAA)

==== Communications ====
- APO Production Unit, Inc. (APO-PUI)
- People's Television Network, Inc. (PTNI)
- Philippine Postal Corporation (PHLPost)

=== Healthcare services sector ===
- La Union Medical Center (LUMC)

=== Realty/Holding Companies ===
- Batangas Land Company, Inc. (BLCI)
- G.Y. Real Estate, Inc. (GYREI)
- Kamayan Realty Corporation (KRC)
- Pinagkaisa Realty Corporation (PiRC)
- ASC Investors, Inc.
- ARC Investors, Inc.
- AP Holdings, Inc.
- Anglo Ventures Corporation
- Fernandez Holdings, Inc.
- First Meridian Development, Inc.
- Randy Allied Ventures, Inc.
- Rock Steel Resources, Inc.
- Roxas Shares, Inc.
- San Miguel Officers Corp. Inc.
- Te Deum Resources, Inc.
- Toda Holdings, Inc.
- Soriano Shares, Inc.
- Valhalla Properties, Inc.

=== GOCCs supervised by the Presidential Commission on Good Government ===
- Performance Investment Corporation (PIC)
- UCPB–CIIF Finance and Development Corporation (COCOFINANCE)
- Independent Realty Corporation (IRC)
- Mid-Pasig Land Development Corporation (MLDC)
- Piedras Petroleum Company, Inc. (PIEDRAS)
- Chemfields, Inc. (CI)
- Bataan Shipyard and Engineering Company (BASECO)
- Banahaw Broadcasting Corporation (BBC)
- United Coconut Planters Life Assurance Corporation (COCOLIFE)
- United Coconut Planters Bank General Insurance, Inc. (COCOGEN)
- United Coconut Chemicals, Inc. (COCOCHEM)
- UCPB–CIIF Foundation, Inc.

=== Under Privatization ===
- GSIS Family Bank (GSIS-FB)
- Intercontinental Broadcasting Corporation (IBC)
- Monterrosa Development Corporation (MDC)
- UCPB Savings Bank (UCPB-SB)

=== Non-operational, Inactive, or Deactivated ===
- Anchor Estate, Inc. (AEI)
- Aviation Services and Training Institute (ASTI)
- BCDA Management and Holdings, Inc. (BMHI)
- Calauag Quezon Province Integrated Coconut Processing Plant, Inc. (CQPICPPI)
- Clark Polytechnic Development Foundation (CPDF)
- DBP Management Corporation (DBPMC)
- First Centennial Clark Corporation (FCCC)
- GSIS Mutual Fund, Inc. (GSIS-MFI)
- GSIS Properties, Inc. (GSIS-PI)
- Integrated Feed Mills Manufacturing Corporation (IFMC)
- Inter-Island Gas Service, Inc. (IIGSI)
- LBP Financial Services SpA (Rome, Italy) (LBP-FSS)
- LBP Remittance Company (USA) (LBP-RC)
- LBP Singapore Representative Office (LBP-SRO)
- LBP Taiwan Representative Office (LBP-TRO)
- LWUA Consult, Inc. (LWUA-CI)
- Manila Gas Corporation (MGC)
- Masaganang Sakahan, Inc. (MSI)
- Meat Packing Corporation of the Philippines (MPCP)
- Metro Transit Organization, Inc. (MTOI)
- NDC–Philippine Infrastructure Corporation (NPIC)
- Paskuhan Development, Inc. (PDI)
- Phil. Centennial Expo '98 Corp. (EXPO FILIPINO)
- Philpost Leasing and Financing Corporation (PLFC)
- North Davao Mining Corporation (NDMC)
- National Sugar Development Company (NASUDECO)
- Corregidor Foundation, Inc. (CFI)
- Batong Buhay Gold Mines, Inc. (BBGMI)
- Philippine Aerospace Development Corporation (PADC)
- PNOC Renewables Corporation (PNOC-RC)

=== Under abolishment ===
- Alabang–Sto. Tomas Development, Inc. (ASDI)
- AFP Retirement and Separation Benefits System (AFP-RSBS)
- CDCP Farms Corporation (CDCP-FC)
- Disc Contractors, Builders and General Services, Inc. (DISC)
- Human Settlements Development Corporation (HSDC)
- National Agri-Business Corporation (NABCOR)
- Panay Railways, Inc. (PRI)
- Philippine Agricultural Development and Commercial Corporation (PADCC)
- Partido Development Administration (PDA)
- Philippine Forest Corporation (PFC)
- Philippine Sugar Corporation (PHILSUCOR)
- Philippine Veterans Investment Development Corporation (PHIVIDEC)
- PNOC Alternative Fuel Corp. (PNOC-AFC)
- PNOC Development and Management Corporation (PNOC-DMC)
- PNOC Shipping and Transport Corporation (PNOC-STC)
- Quedan and Rural Credit Guarantee Corporation (QUEDANCOR)
- Technology Resources Center (TRC)
- Zamboanga National Agricultural College – Rubber Estate Corp. (ZREC)
- First Cavite Industrial Estate, Inc. (FCIEI)
- Northern Foods Corporation (NFC)
- North Luzon Railways Corporation (NORTHRAIL)

=== Dissolved or abolished ===
- Bataan Technology Park, Inc. (BTPI)
- Cottage Industry Technology Center (CITC)
- National Livelihood Development Corp. (NLDC) (Note: merger between Livelihood Corporation (LIVECOR) and National Livelihood Support (NLSF))
- People's Credit and Finance Corporation (PCFC)
- HGC Subic Corporation (HGC-SC)
- NIA Consult, Inc. (NIACI)
- Tierra Factors Corporation (TFC)
- San Carlos Fruits Corporation (SCFC)
- Philippine Fruits and Vegetables Industries, Inc. (PFVII)
- Philippine Veterans Assistance Commission (PVAC)
- Traffic Control Products Corporation (TCPC)

=== Privatized ===
- Southern Utility Management and Services, Inc. (SUMSI)

=== Merged GOCCs ===
- Home Guaranty Corporation (HGC) (Note: merged with PhilExim to form PHILGUARANTEE)
- United Coconut Planters Bank (UCPB) (Note: turned over from the Presidential Commission on Good Government (PCGG) to the Governance Commission for GOCCs (GCG))
- UCPB Leasing and Finance Corporation (ULFC)

=== GOCCs disposed by the Privatization and Management Office ===
- Menzi Development Corporation (MDC)

=== GOCCs excluded from the coverage of Republic Act No. 10149 ===
- Bangko Sentral ng Pilipinas (BSP)
- Central Bank – Board of Liquidators (CB-COL)
- Philippine International Convention Center (PICC)
- PHIVIDEC Panay Agro-Industrial Corp. (PPAlC)
- Philippine Electricity Market Corporation

==== Research Institutions ====
- Lung Center of the Philippines (LCP)
- National Kidney and Transplant Institute (NKTI)
- Philippine Center for Economic Development (PCED)
- Philippine Children's Medical Center (PCMC)
- Philippine Heart Center (PHC)
- Philippine Institute for Development Studies (PIDS)
- Philippine Institute of Traditional and Alternative Health Care (PITAHC)
- Philippine Rice Research Institute (PhilRice)
- Development Academy of the Philippines (DAP)

==== Economic Zone Authorities ====
- Aurora Pacific Economic Zone and Freeport Authority (APECO)
- Authority of the Freeport Area of Bataan (AFAB)
- Cagayan Economic Zone Authority (CEZA)
- Freeport Services Corporation (FSC)
- Northeastern Luzon Pacific Coastal Services, Inc. (NLPCS)
- Philippine Economic Zone Authority (PEZA)
- Subic Bay Metropolitan Authority (SBMA)
- Zamboanga City Special Economic Zone Authority (ZCSEZA)

==== Created by a Supreme Court Decision ====
- Radio Philippines Network (RPN)

==== Sui Generis ====
- Millennium Challenge Account Philippines (MCAP)

== See also ==
- List of government-owned companies
