= Jose Melencio Nartatez =

Chief of the Philippine National Police (born 1971)

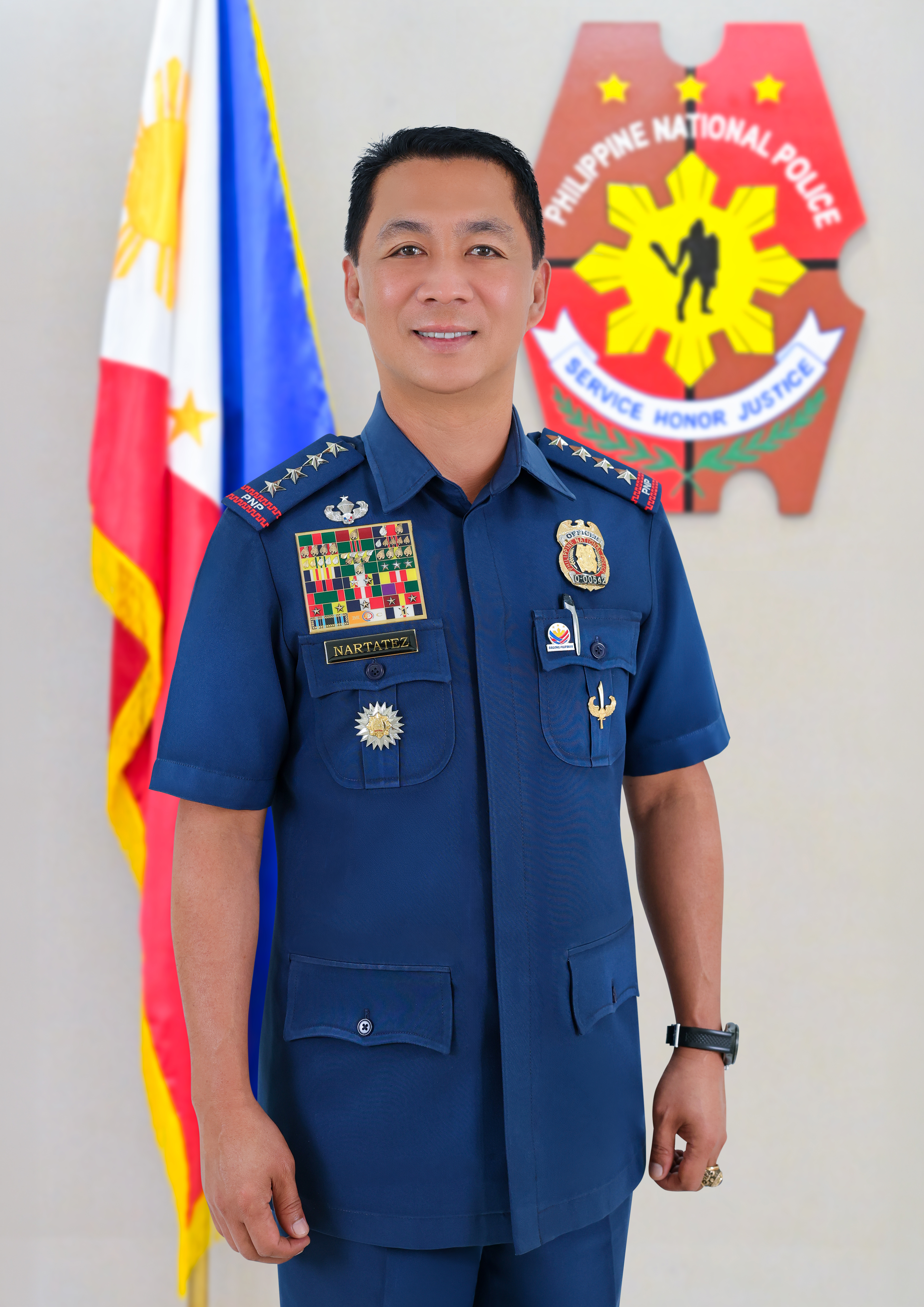
- Official portrait, 2026

32nd Chief of the Philippine National Police
- Incumbent
- Assumed office January 28, 2026; Acting from September 1, 2025-January 28, 2026; OIC from August 26–September 1, 2025
- President: Bongbong Marcos
- Preceded by: Nicolas Torre III

Personal details
- Born: Jose Melencio Corpuz Nartatez Jr. March 19, 1971 (age 55) Santa, Ilocos Sur, Philippines
- Education: Philippine Military Academy (Tanglaw-Diwa Class of 1992); Master in Public Administration
- Police career
- Service: Philippine National Police
- Divisions: PNP Special Action Force; Criminal Investigation and Detection Group; Ilocos Norte Police Provincial Office; PNP Finance Service; Police Regional Office (PRO) 4A Calabarzon; Directorate for Comptrollership; Directorate for Intelligence; National Capital Region Police Office (NCRPO); Deputy Chief for Administration; Area Police Command - Western Mindanao; Office of the Chief PNP
- Service years: 1992–present
- Rank: Police General

Jose Melencio Corpuz Nartatez Jr. (born March 19, 1971) is a Filipino police officer who has served as the 32nd Chief of the Philippine National Police since January 28, 2026, following the removal of Former PNP Chief Nicolas Torre from office. Nartatez has become notable for botching the arrest of Senator Bato Dela Rosa.

== Early life and education ==
Jose Melencio Corpuz Nartatez Jr. was born on March 19, 1971, in Santa, Ilocos Sur, Philippines. He accomplished his primary and secondary education in Metro Manila. He entered the Philippine Military Academy in 1988 and graduated as a member of the Tanglaw-Diwa Class of 1992, the last PMA batch eligible to become PNP chief. He also obtained a master's degree in public administration.

== Early police career ==
Nartatez has held several key positions within the Philippine National Police. He previously served as director of the National Capital Region Police Office (NCRPO), regional director of Calabarzon police, and Ilocos Norte provincial police chief.

In Camp Crame, he served in the Finance Service, later becoming director for comptrollership and intelligence. He also served as a member of the elite PNP Special Action Force and under the Criminal Investigation and Detection Group.

He became Deputy Chief for Administration (the PNP's second-highest position) in October 2024 following the retirement of Police Lieutenant General Emmanuel Peralta.

=== Key Positions ===
- Member, PNP Special Action Force
- Member, PNP-CIDG
- Provincial Director, Ilocos Norte Police Provincial Office
- Director, PNP Finance Service
- Regional Director, Police Regional Office 4A CALABARZON
- Director, Directorate for Comptrollership
- Director, Directorate for Intelligence
- Regional Director, National Capital Region Police Office
- Deputy Chief PNP for Administration
- Commander, Area Police Command - Western Mindanao
- Officer-in-Charge/Acting Chief, PNP
- Chief, PNP

== Chief of the Philippine National Police (since 2026) ==
=== Acting PNP Chief (2025 - 2026) ===
Nartatez was appointed on August 26, 2025, Officer in Charge Chief of the Philippine National Police, following the relief of Police General Nicolas Torre III. His appointment was confirmed by Interior and Local Government Secretary Jonvic Remulla and Executive Secretary Lucas Bersamin. On September 1, 2025, Nartatez was affirmed as Acting PNP chief. He became a 4-star Police General on January 28, 2026, after Torre officially retired on January 19.

=== PNP Chief (since 2026) ===
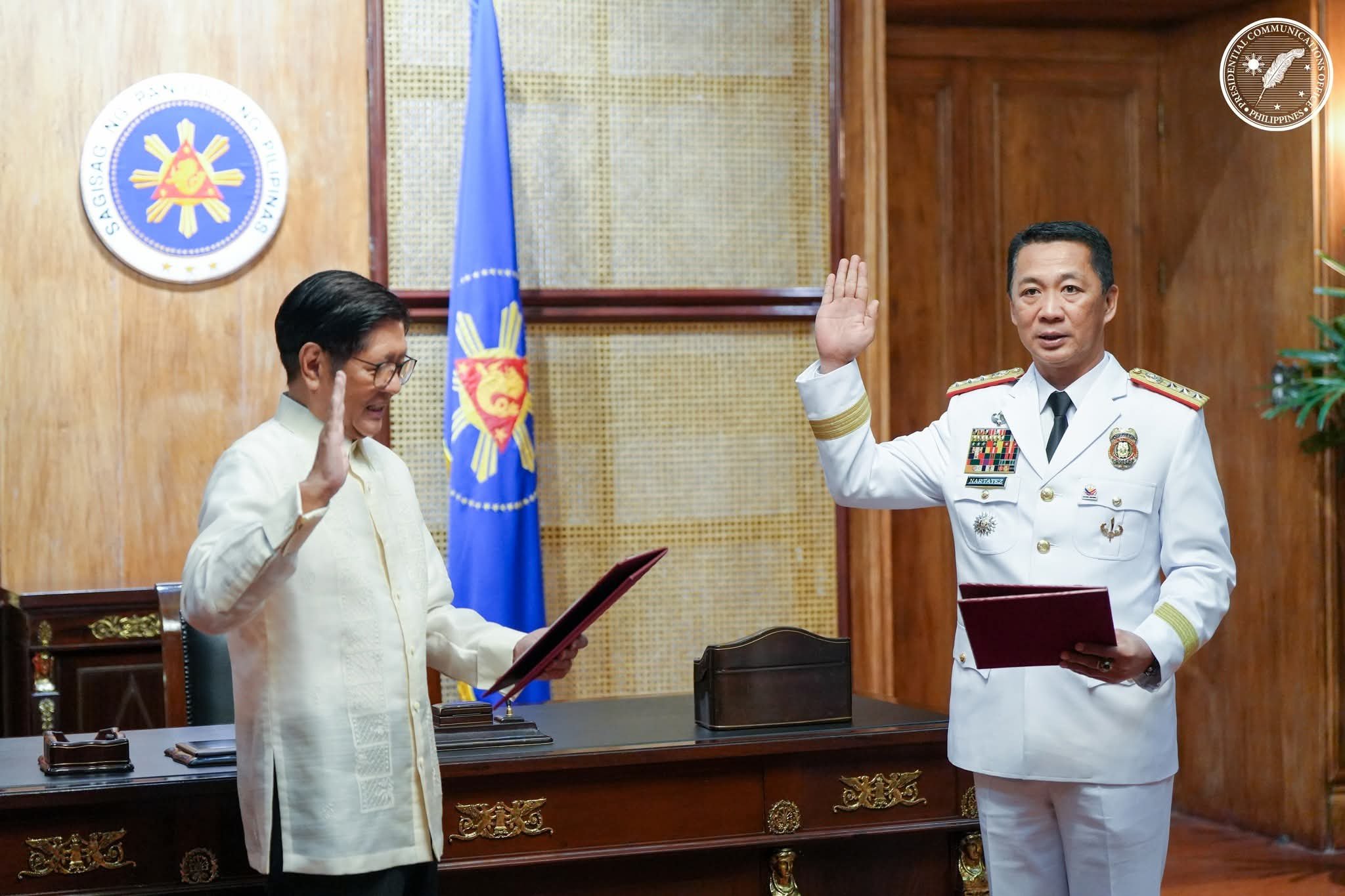
President Ferdinand R. Marcos Jr. led the donning of rank of PNP Chief Gen. Jose Melencio C. Nartatez Jr. in Malacañang on January 28, 2026.

Nartatez was officially appointed as the Chief of the Philippine National Police on January 28, 2026 by President Ferdinand “Bongbong” Marcos Jr.

According to former senator Antonio Trillanes, Nartatez had concrete knowledge of the International Criminal Court warrant against incumbent senator Ronald dela Rosa, a former PNP chief during the Philippine drug war, as early as November 2025, and stated that "not once did he form a tracking team to look for these people."

== Awards and decorations ==
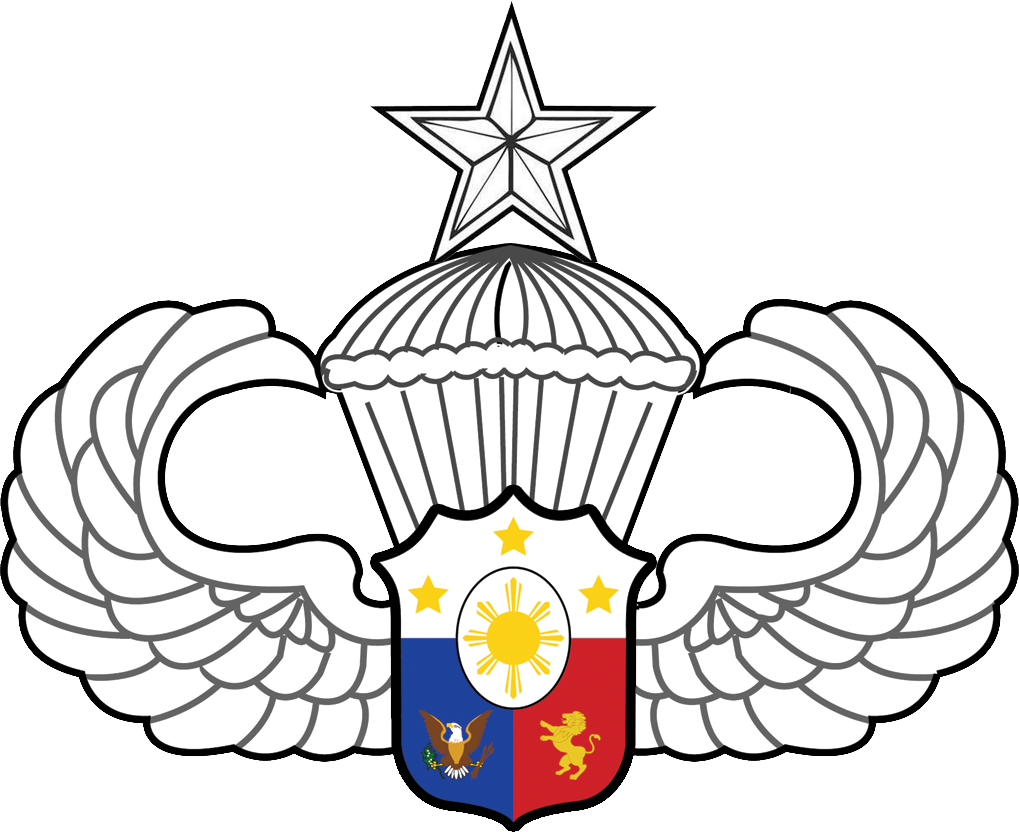
- PNP Senior Parachutist Badge
- Medalya ng Katapatan sa Paglilingkod (PNP Distinguished Service Medal)
- Medalya ng Katangitanging Gawa (PNP Outstanding Achievement Medal)
- Medalya ng Pambihirang Paglilingkod (PNP Special Service Medal)
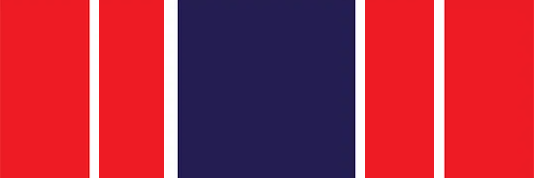
- Medalya ng Kadakilaan (PNP Heroism Medal)
- Military Merit Medal (Medalya ng Kagalingang Militar)
- Medalya ng Kagalingan (PNP Medal of Merit)
- Medalya ng Kasanayan (PNP Efficiency Medal)
- Medalya ng Papuri (PNP Commendation Medal)
- Medalya ng Pagkilala (PNP Recognition Medal)
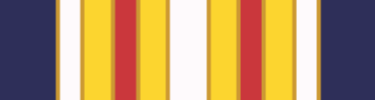
- Medalya ng Ugnayang Pampulisya (PNP Relations Medal)
- Medalya ng Mabuting Asal (PNP Good Conduct Medal)
- Medalya ng Paglilingkod (PNP Service Medal)
- Anti-Dissidence Campaign Medal
- Medalya ng Paglilingkod sa Luzon (PNP Luzon Campaign Medal)
- Medalya ng Paglilingkod sa Visayas (PNP Visayas Campaign Medal)
- Mindanao Anti-Dissidence Campaign Medal & Ribbon
- Medalya ng Paglilingkod sa Mindanao (PNP Mindanao Campaign Medal)
- Disaster Relief & Rehabilitation Operation Ribbon
- Medalya ng Pagtulong sa Nasalanta (PNP Disaster Relief and Rehabilitation Operations Campaign Medal)
- Philippine Republic Presidential Unit Citation Badge (PRPUCB)
- Medalya ng Tsapang Natatanging Unit (PNP Unit Citation Medal)
- People Power II Unit Citation
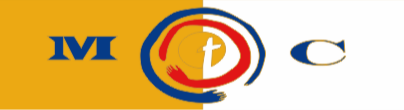
- Medalya ng Paglilingkod sa Santo Papa (Pope Francis Service Medal)
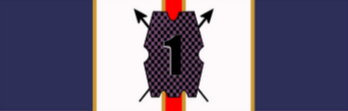
- Medalya ng Paglaban sa Kriminalidad (PNP Lambat Sibat Medal)
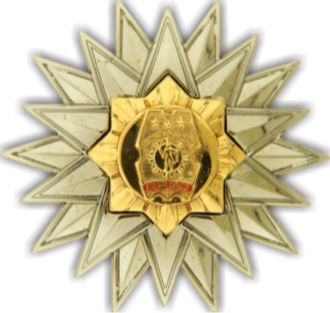
- PNP Office Senior Executive Course Badge (PNP OSEC Badge)
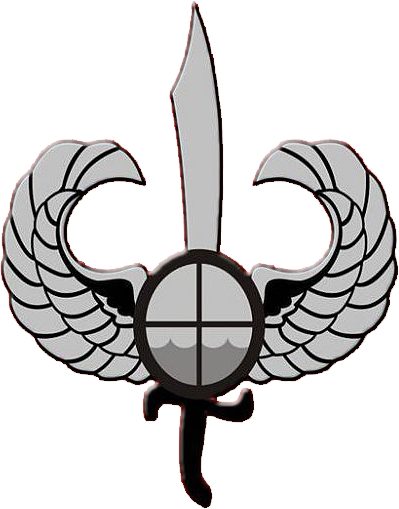
- Special Action Force Badge
