= Emmanuel Peralta =

Former chief of the Philippine National Police

Chief of the Philippine National Police
- Officer-In-Charge
- In office March 31, 2024 – April 1, 2024
- President: Bongbong Marcos
- Preceded by: PGen. Benjamin Acorda
- Succeeded by: PGen. Rommel Marbil

Personal details
- Born: Emmanuel Baloloy Peralta; August 24, 1968 (age 58)
- Education: Philippine Military Academy
- Police career
- Service: Philippine National Police
- Divisions: PNP Chief of Directorial Staff; Deputy Chief for Administration; Director of Operations; Directorate for Human Resource and Doctrine Development
- Police offices: Ilocos Region PRO (1); Southern Police District
- Service years: 1991–2024
- Rank: Police Lieutenant General

Emmanuel Baloloy Peralta (born August 24, 1968) is a Filipino police officer who served as the Officer-in-Charge of the Philippine National Police from March 31 to April 1, 2024.

== Career ==
Hailing from Nueva Ecija, Peralta served as PNP Chief of Directorial Staff, Deputy Chief for Administration, Director of Operations, and Directorate for Human Resource and Doctrine Development. He also formerly served as Southern Police District director and director of Ilocos Region Police Office. He was appointed as Officer-in-Charge of the Philippine National Police on March 31, 2024, replacing his batchmate Benjamin Acorda who retired. He was replaced when Rommel Marbil was appointed the next day.

Police appointments
Preceded by PGEN Benjamin Acorda	OIC Chief of the Philippine National Police	Succeeded by PGEN Rommel Francisco Marbil
