= PolPHIL Party =

Progressive political party in the Philippines founded in 2024

The People's Progressive Humanist Liberal Party Partido ng Bayan para sa Progresibong Humanistang Liberal
- Abbreviation: PolPHIL Party
- President: Benjamin C. Acorda Jr.
- Chairperson: Rudy Cañeda
- Secretary-General: Ricardo “Ric” Serrano
- Spokesperson: Elmer Argaño
- Chairman Emeritus: Edicio dela Torre
- Founded: February 10, 2024; 2 years ago
- Headquarters: Quezon City, Philippines
- Ideology: Progressivism; Social liberalism Secular humanism
- Political position: Center-left
- Colors: Savoy blue
- Slogan: Larga, Magkaisa Pilipinas!

The People's Progressive Humanist Liberal Party or shortened to PolPHIL Party is a centre-left political party based in the Philippines led by national president former Chief of the Philippine National Police, Benjamin C. Acorda Jr.

== History ==
The People's Progressive Humanist Liberal Party (PolPHIL Party) was launched on February 10, 2024, on its first national assembly at Bahay ng Alumni, University of the Philippines, Diliman, Quezon City. From January 5–7, 2024 at Bohol Shores Resort Dauis, Bohol with Rudy Cañeda, the founding president of Political Officers League of the Philippines (POLPhil) was the organizer and a co-founder for the party. POLPhil backed six senatorial bets for the 2022 senate elections which were Sen. Risa Hontiveros, Sen. JV Ejercito, Herbert Bautista, Guillermo Eleazar, Neri Colmenares, and Chel Diokno during its 3rd national assembly at the Manila Hotel. Other participants of the gathering were Fr. Edicio dela Torre, a former catholic priest and former political prisoner during martial law Prof. Nestor Castro, a former University of the Philippines (UP) vice-chancellor, Niva Gonzales an academic professor, and many more people. Sen. Imee Marcos attended the party's 2nd national assembly.

== Leadership ==
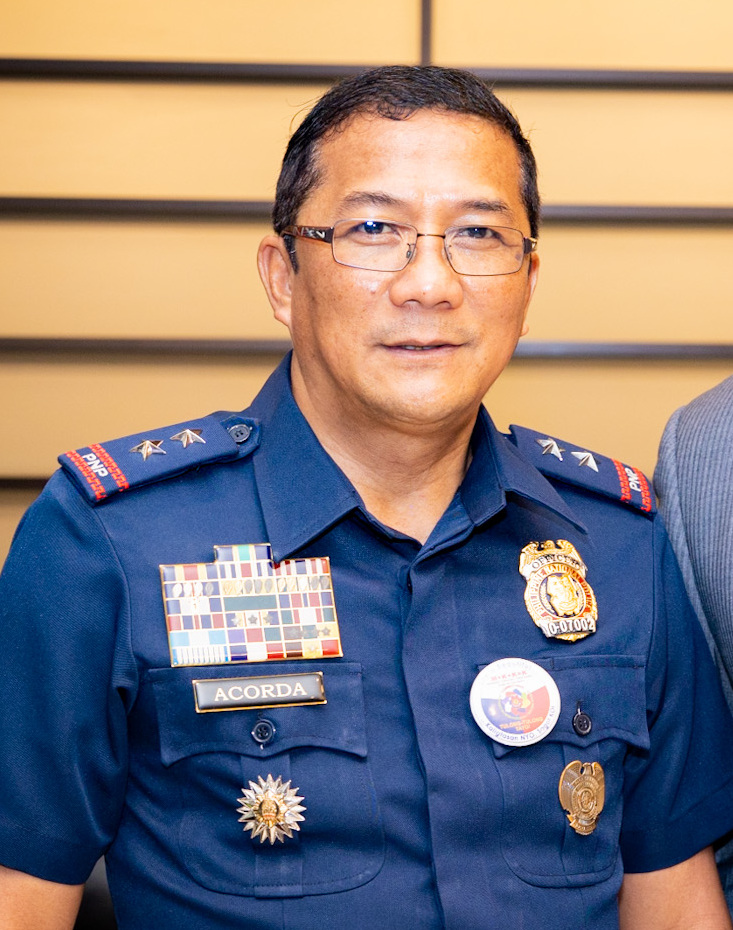
Benjamin C. Acorda Jr, President of the PolPHIL Party

- Party President: Benjamin Acorda Jr.
- Party Chairman: Rudy Cañeda
- Party Vice Chairman and Spokesperson: Elmer Argaño
- Party Chairman Emeritus: Edicio dela Torre
- Party Secretary-General: Ric Serrano

PolPHIL's national president is former Philippine National Police (PNP) chief, Benjamin C. Acorda Jr. the party's national chairman is Rudy Cañeda and the party's chairman emeritus, Edicio dela Torre. the party's secretary-general is Ricardo "Ric" Serrano. The party's council of elders are Nilo dela Cruz, a former chairman of Revolutionary Proletarian Army, the armed wing of the Revolutionary Workers' Party. Edicio dela Torre. Bishop Nilo Tayag, a founding member of the National United Front for the Kingdom of God and Filipinism (NUF-KGF) and a co-founder of the Kabataang Makabayan and Rodolfo Salas, also known as "Kumander Bilog", a former chairman of the Communist Party of the Philippines and the New People's Army in which he led until 1987. The party’s vice chairman and spokesperson is Elmer Argaño.

== Electoral performance ==
=== Legislative elections ===
Congress of the Philippines
House of Representatives			Senate			
Year	Seats won	Result	Year	Seats won	Ticket	Result
2025	Did not participate	Lakas–CMD plurality	2025	Did not participate		Alyansa para sa Bagong Pilipinas win 6/12 seats
