= Rodolfo Azurin Jr. =

Current chief of police of the Philippine National Police

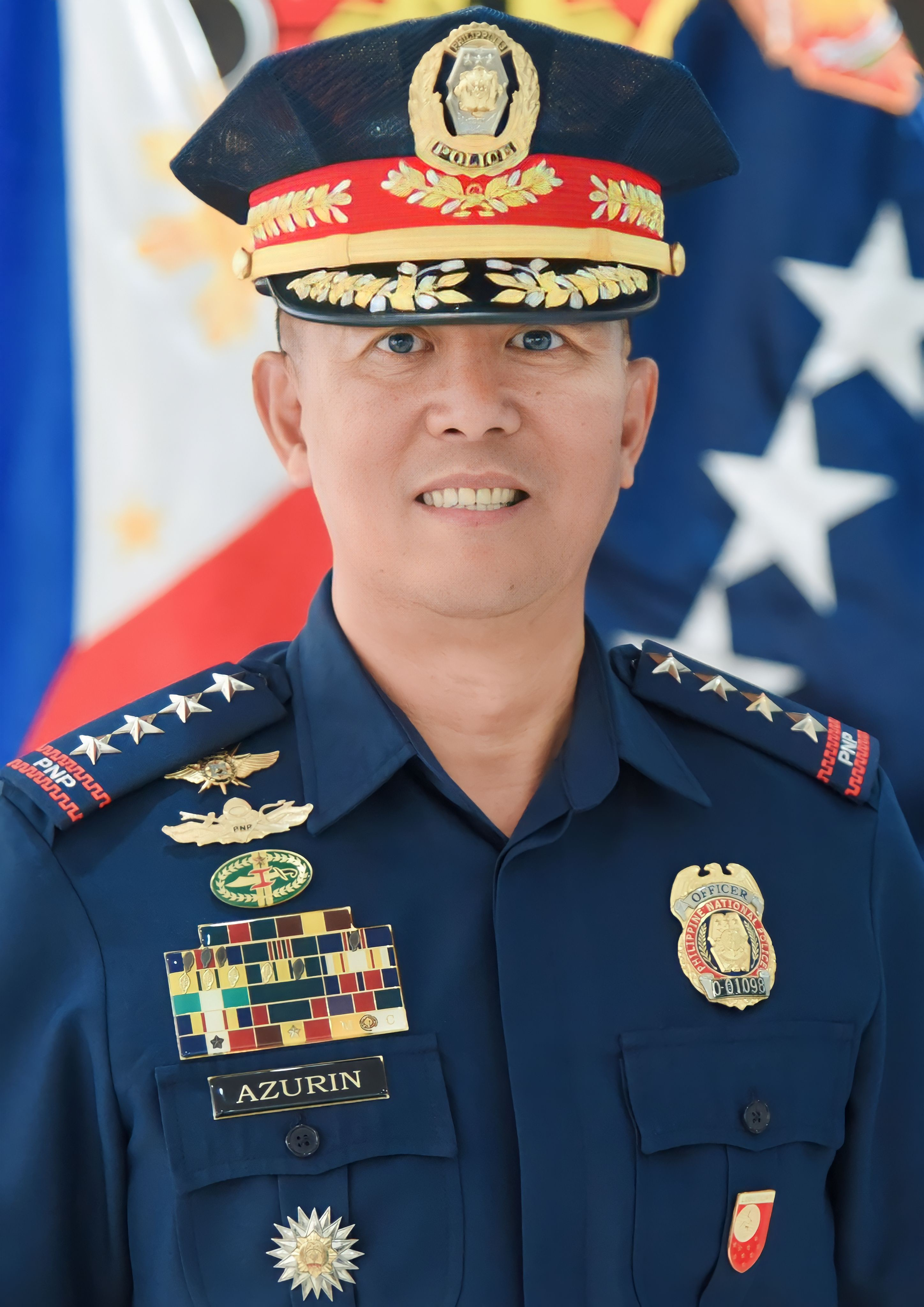
- Official portrait, 2023

Special Adviser and Investigator of the Independent Commission for Infrastructure
- In office October 13, 2025 – March 31, 2026
- President: Bongbong Marcos
- Preceded by: Benjamin Magalong
- Succeeded by: Position abolished

28th Chief of the Philippine National Police
- In office August 1, 2022 – April 24, 2023
- President: Bongbong Marcos
- Preceded by: PLTGEN. Vicente D. Danao Jr. (OIC)
- Succeeded by: PGEN. Benjamin C. Acorda Jr.

Personal details
- Born: April 24, 1967 (age 59) Paniqui, Tarlac, Philippines
- Spouse: Mary Grace Lino
- Children: 3
- Parent: Rodolfo Azurin Sr. (father)
- Education: Philippine Military Academy (BS)
- Nickname: Jun Azurin
- Police career
- Service: Philippine Constabulary (1989–1991); Philippine National Police (1991–present)
- Divisions: Area Police Command; — Northern Luzon; — Southern Luzon; Directorate for Comptrollership; Directorate for Information and Communication Technology Management (DICTM)
- Police offices: Ilocos Region PRO
- Service years: 1989–2023
- Rank: Police General
- Badge no.: 0-01099

Rodolfo Santos Azurin Jr. (born April 24, 1967) is a former police officer who formerly served as the chief of the Philippine National Police during the term of President Bongbong Marcos He officially succeeded acting chief Vicente Danao on August 1, 2022, becoming the 28th chief of police. Serving for only 9 months until his retirement on April 24, 2023.

== Biography ==
Azurin was born in Paniqui, Tarlac on April 24, 1967, and raised in La Trinidad, Benguet.

Azurin graduated from the Philippine Military Academy 'Makatao' class of 1989.

He was the former commander of the Northern Luzon Police Area as well as the PNP Northern Luzon. Azurin also once served as Ilocos region police chief. During his tenure as regional director, he introduced "Kasimbayanan", a portmanteau of the words "Kapulisan, Simbahan, at Pamayanan" (Police force, church, and community) which is a social program to lessen crime and insurgency. He also held top positions in Camp Crame such as the director of the Directorate for Comptrollership (DC) and the Directorate for Information and Communication Technology Management (DICTM). Prior to becoming the chief of police, Azurin served as the commander of the Northern Luzon Police Area.

He was appointed by President Bongbong Marcos on August 1, 2022, after the announcement by Press Secretary Trixie Cruz-Angeles in a press conference, along with Lt. Gen. Bartolome Vicente Bacarro as the new chief-of-staff of the Armed Forces of the Philippines (AFP).

He is expected to retire in April 2023 with 9 months in tenure as chief of police. However, he, alongside the Command Group, submitted his courtesy resignation to the Department of the Interior and Local Government on January 5, 2023, after Secretary Benjamin Abalos Jr. appealed to all high-ranking Philippine National Police officials as there were senior officials involved in illegal drugs trade.

On October 13 2025, Azurin was appointed as special adviser and investigator of the Independent Commission for Infrastructure by President Bongbong Marcos replacing Mayor Benjamin Magalong.

== Police Career ==
=== Key Positions ===
- Regional Director, Police Regional Office 1
- Director, Directorate for Comptrollership
- Director, Directorate for Information and Communications Technology Management
- Commander, Area Police Command - Southern Luzon
- Commander, Area Police Command - Northern Luzon
- Chief, PNP
