= Nicolas Torre vs. Baste Duterte =

2025 charity boxing match

Nicolas Torre vs Baste Duterte
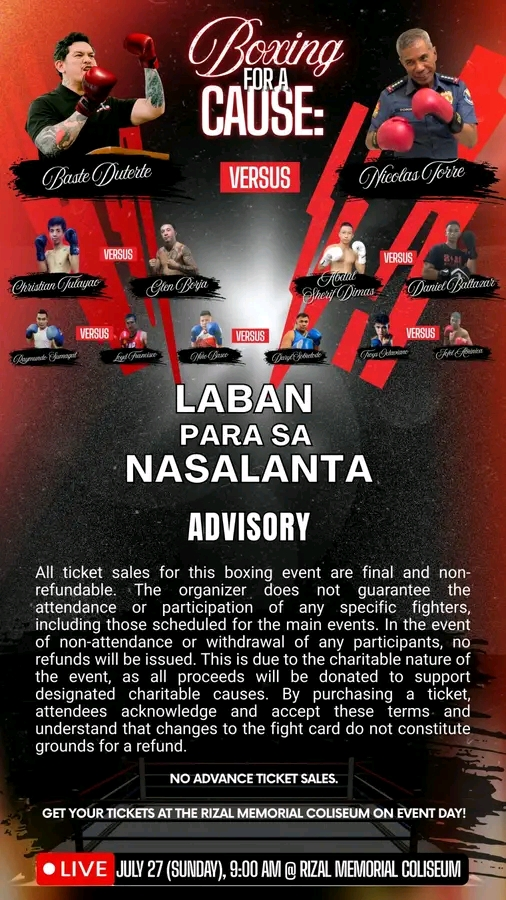
- Date: July 27, 2025
- Venue: Rizal Memorial Coliseum, Manila, Philippines

Tale of the tape
| Boxer | Nicolas Torre | Baste Duterte |
| Hometown | Jolo, Sulu, Philippines | Davao City, Philippines |
| Age | 55 years, 4 months | 37 years, 8 months |

Result
- Torre won by default

Nicolas Torre vs. Baste Duterte was a charity boxing match between Philippine National Police chief Nicolas Torre III and Davao City acting mayor Sebastian Duterte. The event took place on July 27, 2025, at the Rizal Memorial Coliseum in Manila, Philippines.

The charity event has generated over ₱20,000,000 (US$349,957) in cash donations, along with relief goods for the victims of the recent calamities that affected the country in the past weeks.

Torre was declared the winner by default after a no-show from Duterte.

The fight was subsequently referenced by President Bongbong Marcos on his State of the Nation Address which took place a day later, jokingly referring to Torre as champion.

== Background ==
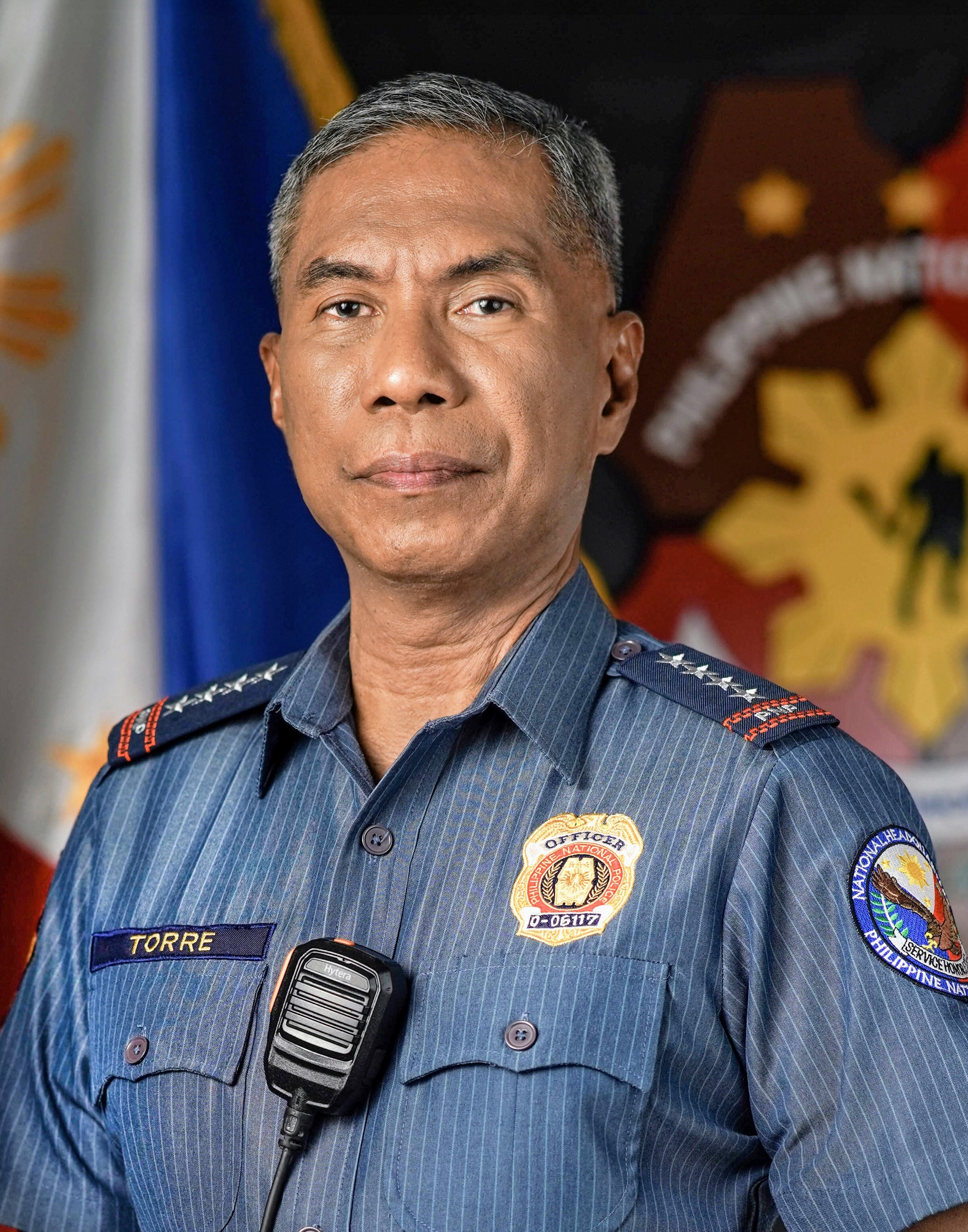
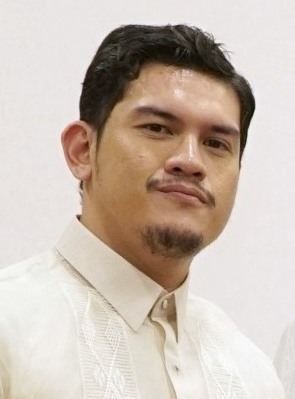
Nicolas Torre (left) and Baste Duterte (right).

=== Arrest of Rodrigo Duterte ===
On March 11, 2025, former Philippine President Rodrigo Duterte, father of Sebastian Duterte, was arrested by the Philippine National Police (PNP) and Interpol under an International Criminal Court (ICC) warrant charging him with crimes against humanity related to the Philippine drug war. The arrest in the Philippines was led by Nicolas Torre III, who was then the Criminal Investigation and Detection Group (CIDG) chief.

On July 20, Sebastian Duterte alleged that Torre, now the PNP chief, is "harassing" him and "kidnapped" his father following the arrest. In the a podcast, he challenged the police chief into a fistfight. Torre accepted the challenge on July 23 in the condition of turning it into a charity boxing match or distribution of aid for the victims of the recent floodings around the country that happened in the past weeks.

=== Days leading to the fight ===
Prior to the set date of the event, Duterte set conditions before agreeing to be bout he had proposed, stating that Torre must persuade President Bongbong Marcos to implement mandatory hair follicle drug testing for all elected officials.

On July 25, two days before the bout, Duterte reportedly flew to Singapore with some family members for a personal trip until July 29. He stated that the trip was long planned before the match and his travel clearance was approved by Secretary of the Interior and Local Government Jonvic Remulla on July 20. On July 26, Duterte suggested to postpone the match to a weekday, citing prior commitments on a Sunday, the scheduled day of the bout.

== Fight details ==
=== Sanctioning ===
The bout between Torre and Duterte was sanctioned by the Games and Amusement Board (GAB). The guidelines outlining the safety and welfare of the bout's participants were then published by the GAB on July 25, 2025. According to acting GAB secretary Mark Libunao, the match will help "encourage the values of discipline, resilience and camaraderie among Filipinos".

=== Results ===
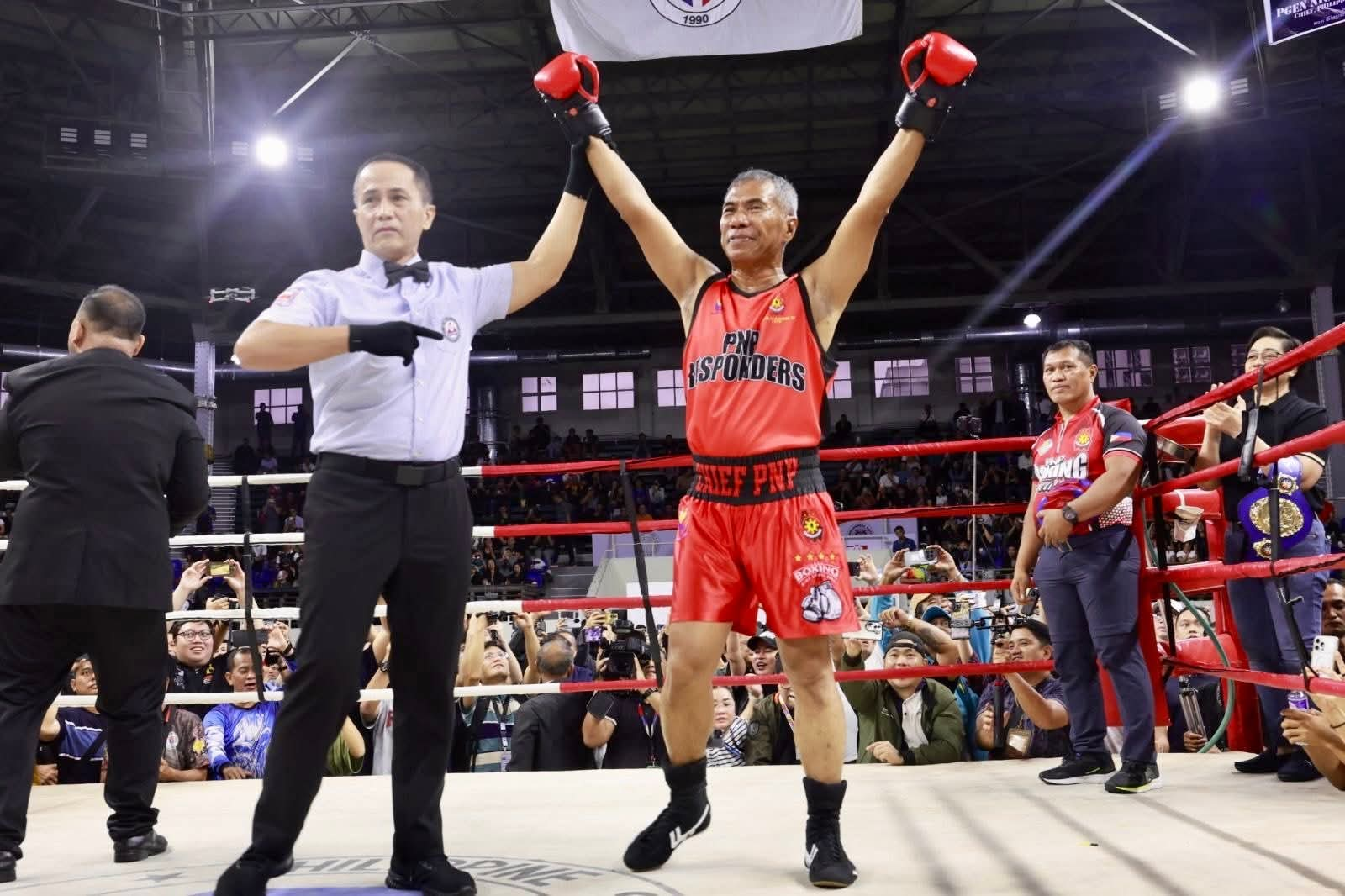
Nicolas Torre (right) has his hand raised by the referee after being declared the winner of the match by default.

Torre was declared the winner by default after Duterte failed to appear for the scheduled match. He later declared he was no longer open to a rematch with Duterte, stating that Duterte’s remarks no longer made any sense.

=== Undercard matches ===
There were three undercard matches that was held prior the main event.
