= Brian Keith Hosaka =

Filipino attorney

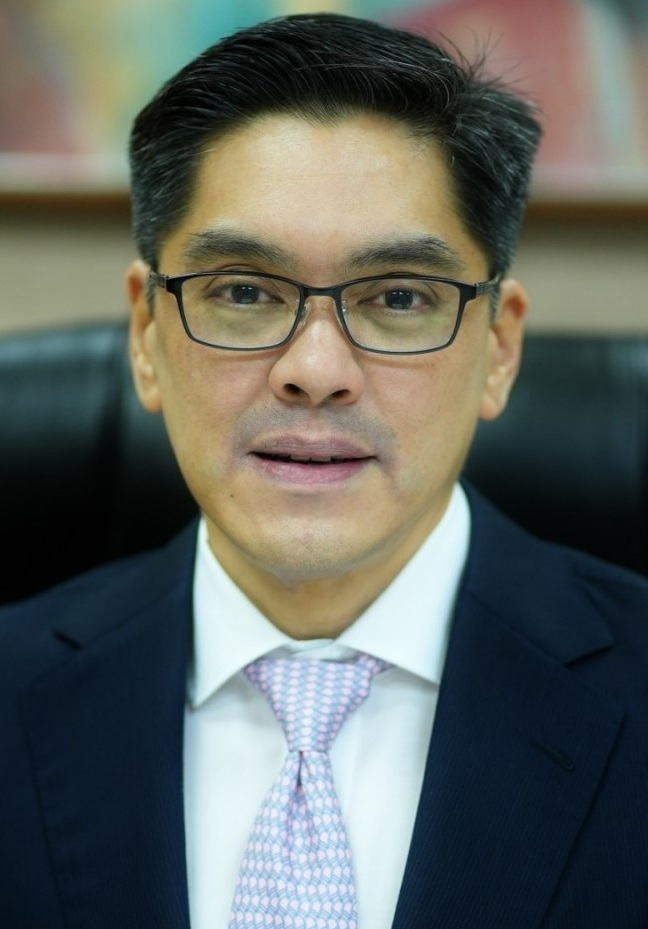

Executive Director of the Independent Commission for Infrastructure
- In office October 24, 2025 – March 31, 2026
- President: Bongbong Marcos
- Preceded by: Position established
- Succeeded by: Position abolished

Commissioner of the Governance Commission for GOCCs
- In office August 4, 2023 – October 24, 2025
- President: Bongbong Marcos

Personal details
- Born: Brian Keith F. Hosaka
- Education: Ateneo de Manila University (JD)
- Profession: Lawyer

Brian Keith F. Hosaka is a Filipino lawyer who has served as the executive director and spokesperson of the Independent Commission for Infrastructure since its establishment in 2025.

== Early life and education ==
Hosaka studied at the Ateneo de Manila University from elementary to law school. He obtained his Juris Doctor in 1998, and passed the Philippine Bar Examinations shortly thereafter.

== Career ==
His legal career began in the public sector as a law clerk for then-Senior Associate Justice Josue N. Bellosillo at the Supreme Court. Following this, he transitioned to private practice, becoming a founding partner of the firm Paner Hosaka & Ypil Attorneys-at-Law. He also served the legal community as the Deputy General Counsel of the Integrated Bar of the Philippines (IBP).

Hosaka returned to the Supreme Court as the Assistant Court Administrator and Chief of the Public Information Office (PIO). He served as the Supreme Court Spokesperson during the terms of Chief Justices Lucas Bersamin, Diosdado Peralta and Alexander Gesmundo.

During his tenure, Hosaka contributed to modernizing the judiciary's communication channels, particularly during the COVID-19 pandemic. He led the PIO's pivot to digital media, overseeing the creation of the Court's official social media presence, the production of educational infomercials, and the launch of podcasts to make judicial proceedings more accessible to the public. He also managed public information regarding critical court issuances and the unprecedented shift to online hearings during the lockdowns.

On August 3, 2025, Hosaka was appointed as Commissioner of the Governance Commission for GOCCs.

On October 24, 2025, He was appointed as executive director of the Independent Commission for Infrastructure.
