= Rommel Marbil =

Chief of the Philippine National Police from 2024 to 2025

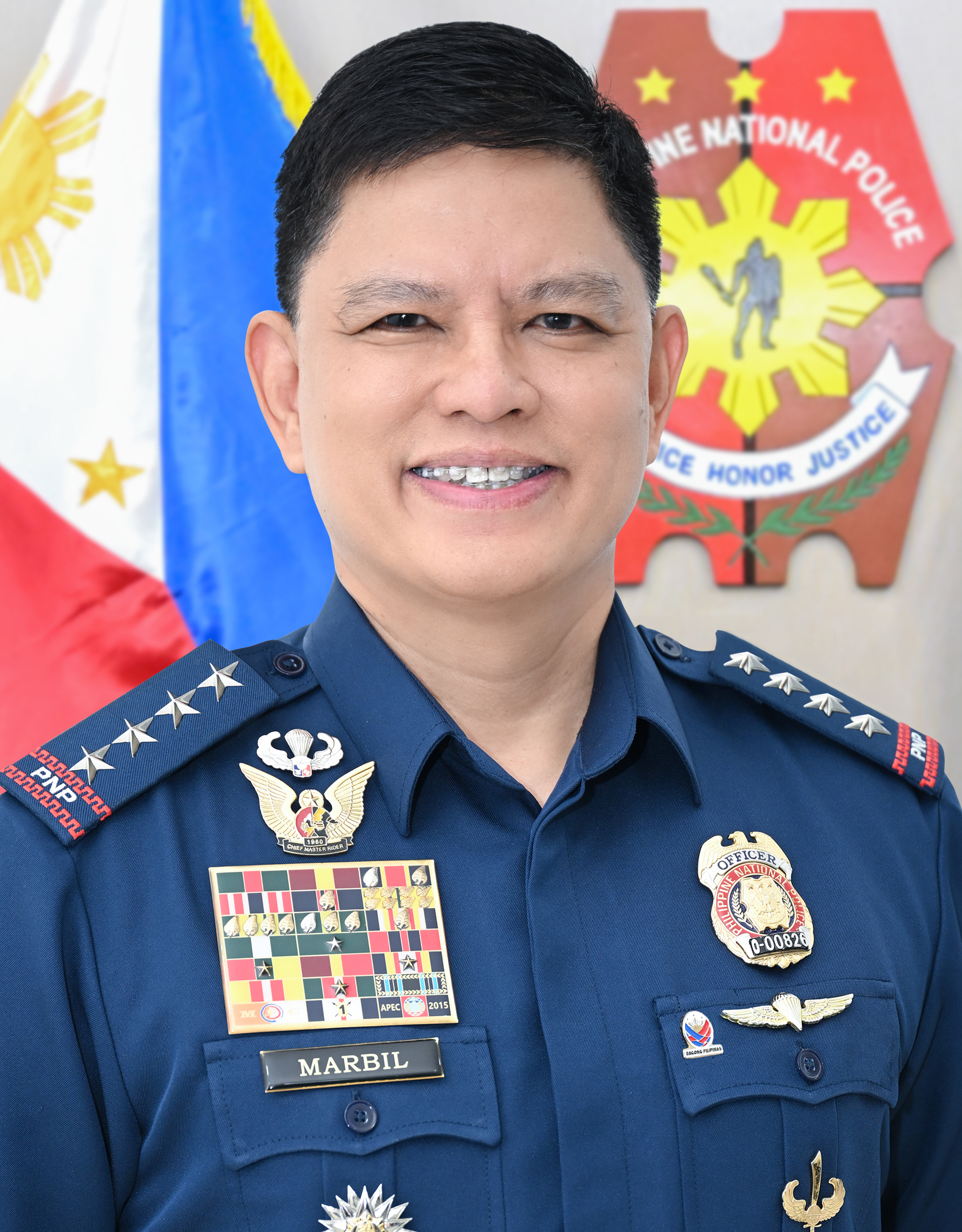
- Official portrait, 2024

30th Chief of the Philippine National Police
- In office April 1, 2024 – June 2, 2025
- President: Bongbong Marcos
- Preceded by: PLtGen. Emmanuel B. Peralta (OIC)
- Succeeded by: PGen. Nicolas Torre

Personal details
- Born: Rommel Francisco Dayleg Marbil; February 7, 1969 (age 57) Manila, Philippines
- Spouse: Mary Rose Marbil
- Children: 1
- Education: Philippine Military Academy
- Police career
- Service: Philippine National Police
- Divisions: Directorate for Comptrollership; Highway Patrol Group
- Police offices: Eastern Visayas PRO; Agusan del Norte PPO
- Service years: 1991–2025
- Rank: Police General

Rommel Francisco Dayleg Marbil (born February 7, 1969) is a Filipino police officer who served as the 30th Chief of the Philippine National Police from April 1, 2024, to June 2, 2025. Prior to his assumption as the PNP Chief, Marbil served as the director of the PNP's Directorate for Comptrollership. Marbil's term as PNP Chief was extended by 4 months from February 7, 2025, to June 2, 2025, which allowed him to serve beyond the mandatory retirement age of 56 due to the security and stability concerns on the 2025 Philippine Midterm Elections.

== Career ==
Graduate of Philippine Military Academy (PMA) “Sambisig” Class of 1991, Marbil served on his early years as the chief of Bacoor City police (2004 to 2006), commander of the Presidential Protection Security Force of United Nations Contingent in Liberia (2006 to 2007), and chief of the Force Intelligence Division of Special Action Force (2008 to 2009).

He served as director of the Agusan del Norte police way back in 2014 until 2015. Before the pandemic, Marbil became the chief of staff of the Civil Security Group from 2019 to 2020. He led the Highway Patrol Group as its director from November 19, 2021, to August 8, 2022. He also served as the regional director of Eastern Visayas police from August 8, 2022, to May 2, 2023.

Marbil also served as the director of PNP's Directorate for Comptrollership from May 2, 2023, to April 1, 2024, before being appointed as the new Chief of the Philippine National Police.

=== Key Positions ===
- Provincial Director, Augusan Del Norte Police Provincial Office
- Chief of Staff, PNP Civil Security Group
- Director, HPG
- Regional Director, Police Regional Office 8
- Director, Directorate for Comptrollership
- Chief, PNP

== Controversies ==
=== "Celebrity" treatment controversy ===
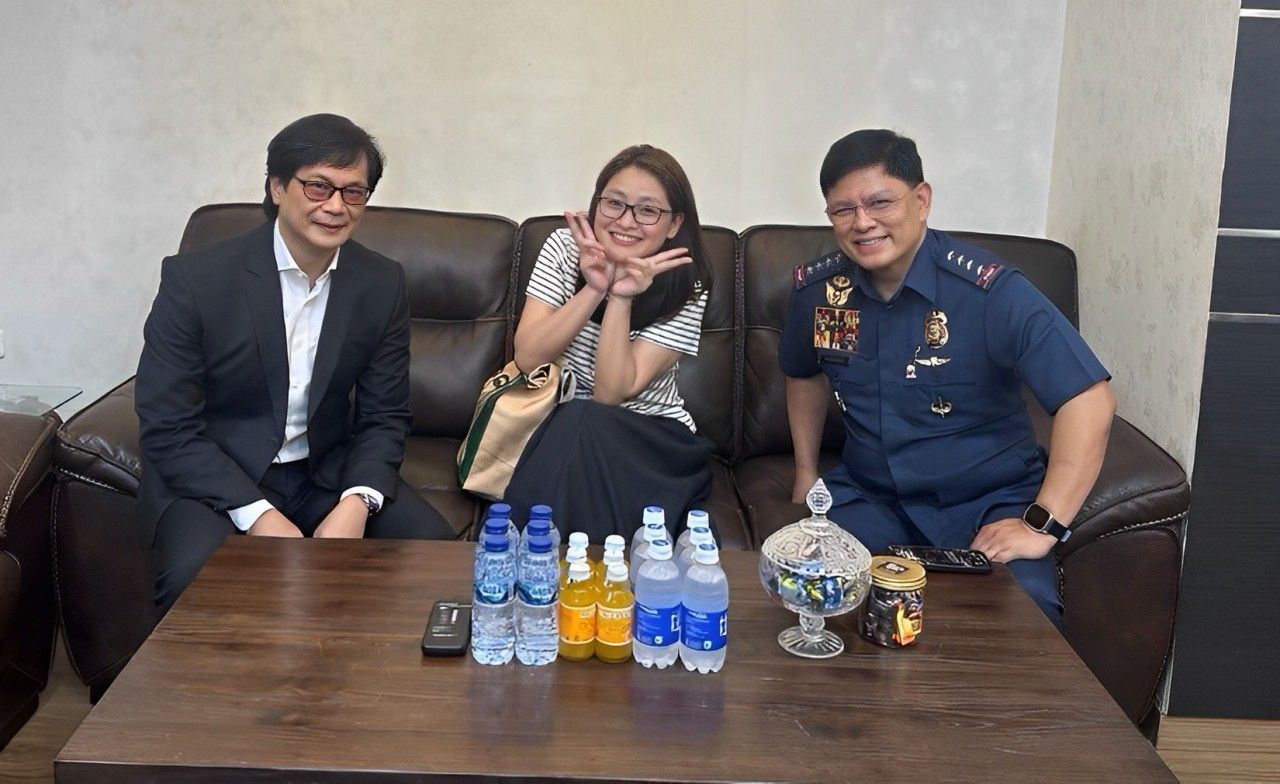
Interior and Local Government Secretary Benjamin Abalos Jr. (left) and PNP chief Rommel Marbil (right) accompanying Guo (center) during her deportation proceedings in Indonesia. This particular photo drew negative reception in the Philippines due to Guo and the officials cheerful behavior when taken to context the actual circumstances behind the photo.

Critics, including lawmakers and social media users, condemned the warm reception to Alice Guo had received from Philippine officials in Indonesia, after her arrest, which included them posing cheerfully in photographs with her, a practice deemed more suitable for celebrity encounters than law enforcement. A photo of Interior secretary Benhur Abalos and Marbil documenting a private meeting with Guo was particularly given focus by critics for its bad optics.

=== EDSA Busway entry ===
On February 26, 2025, Marbil's escorted convoy passed through the EDSA Busway, but flagged down by the traffic enforcers. The policemen to the enforcers stated that they are "in an emergency meeting", and pleaded with the enforcers to just issue them a traffic ticket. Days later, Marbil either did not deny or confirm he was in the convoy. Presidential spokesperson Claire Castro stated that there are exemptions in entry of the busway, but doesn't include emergency meetings.

== Personal life ==
Marbil is married to Mary Rose and has a daughter.

Police appointments
Preceded by PLTGEN Emmanuel Peralta (OIC)	Chief of the Philippine National Police	Succeeded by Nicolas Torre; Designate
