= Governance Commission for GOCCs =

- Logo

Agency overview
- Jurisdiction: Philippines
- Agency executives: Marius P. Corpus, Chairperson; Brian Keith Hosaka, Commissioner; Geraldine Marie Berberabe-Martinez, Commissioner
- Parent department: Office of the President
- Website: gcg.gov.ph

The Governance Commission for GOCCs (GCG), officially the Governance Commission for Government-Owned or -Controlled Corporations, is a government agency of the Philippines established by Republic Act No. 10149, also known as the Governance Act of 2011. It serves as the central policy-making, advisory, and regulatory body for the operations and management of government-owned and controlled corporations (GOCCs). The GCG is headed by chairperson Marius P. Corpus, with Brian Keith Hosaka and Geraldine Marie Berberabe-Martinez serving as commissioners.

The Bangko Sentral ng Pilipinas (BSP), the country's central bank, is not under the jurisdiction of the GCG because it enjoys fiscal and administrative autonomy under its charter.
