= Zamboanga City Special Economic Zone =

Special economic zone in the Philippines

Agency overview
- Formed: February 23, 1995
- Headquarters: San Ramon, Zamboanga City, Philippines; 7.003675°N 121.9237°E
- Agency executive: Raul M. Regondola, Chairman and Administrator
- Parent agency: Office of the President
- Website: www.zfa.gov.ph

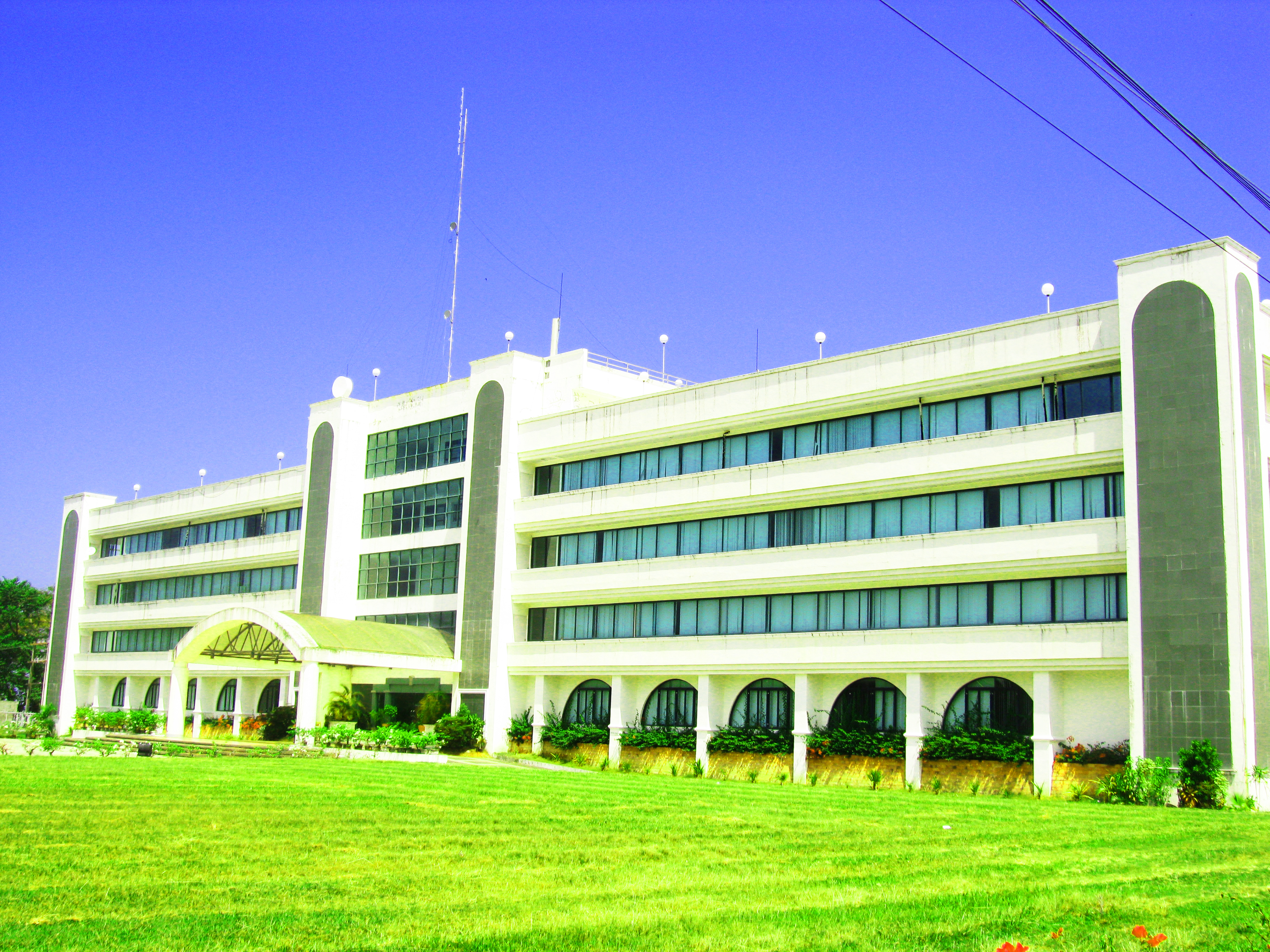
Zamboanga City Special Economic Zone Authority

The Zamboanga City Special Economic Zone (or ZamboEcoZone), otherwise known by its corporate name as Zamboanga Freeport Authority (ZFA), is a special economic zone located in Zamboanga City in the province of Zamboanga del Sur in Mindanao, Philippines. It is the only economic zone located in Western Mindanao.

The Zamboanga Freeport Authority was conceptualized to be an economic hub that is designed to generate local economic activities that will serve as a springboard for the promotion of trade, investments, and ecology tourism not only in Zamboanga City but also throughout the region.

By nature of its operation, Zamboanga Freeport Authority is unique being both an economic zone and free port and is the only free port in Mindanao.

ZAMBOECOZONE is a self-contained multiple layered economic free port zone offering 100% foreign business ownership with fiscal and non-fiscal incentives for investors who wish to locate in this trade centre in the east of Asia. Cumulative committed investments in 2015 reached Php 23.6 billion with prospective 1,301 jobs generated from existing French, Japanese, Korean and Filipino locators.

== History ==
The Zamboecozone was created by virtue of Republic Act 7903 authored by former Congresswoman Maria Clara L. Lobregat. It was enacted into law on February 23, 1995, and made operational a year later with the appointment of a Chairman and Administrator and the members of the Board by former President Fidel V. Ramos.

== Administration ==
Zamboanga City Special Economic Zone Authority and Freeport
- Type: Government Corporation
- Industry: Special economic zone
- Headquarters: Brgy. San Ramon, Zamboanga City, Philippines
- Area served: BIMP-EAGA, Zamboanga Peninsula
- Key people: Raul M. Regondola; Chairman and Administrator ' †'; Vice Chairman; Maria Isabelle G. Climaco; Director - Representing the City of Zamboanga 'Cesar Jimenez Jr. Director - Representing the 1st Legislative District of the City of Zamboanga; Crisanto B. Dela Cruz; Director - Representing the City Council of Zamboanga ' Director - Representing the Local Investors; Jose J. Suan; Director - Representing the Labor Sector Vacant; Director - Representing the Foreign Investors
- Website: Zamboanga City Special Economic Zone Authority

The Ecozone is governed by the Board of Directors of the Zamboanga City Special Economic Zone Authority, a corporate body to handle the management and operation of the ecozone.

== Focus areas ==
The current investments and public-private partnership schemes are centred around four (4) focus areas:

=== The New Port (San Ramon Newport) ===
The site of the new port in Sitio San Ramon extends three (3) kilometers. It will be developed in multiple phases, comprising container terminals that can accommodate general cargo traffic, vehicle imports, livestock imports, bulk grain imports, offshore support vessels, coast guard vessels and marine support vessels.

=== Halal Food Manufacturing Centre (Asian Halal Centre) ===
The one hundred (100) hectares food processing complex is capable of housing prospective manufacturers of halal food and food grade products that are targeted to garner 30% market share of the USD15.9 billion in potential business. The Zamboecozone currently has signed a Memorandum of Agreement with the National Commission on Muslim Filipinos for the promotion and development of local halal industries.

=== West Corporate Centre ===
This consists of low-rise commercial buildings offered as a mixed-use office and commercial zone for prime leases to corporations and locators. Situated in the vibrant west coast of Zamboanga City, this prime office location will serve as the central business district for banks and other financial and industrial operations. Principally built to attract operation hubs for business process outsourcing companies (BPOs) looking for 2nd wave cities to tap the USD 18.4 billion revenues market.

=== Bio-Security Farms (La Paz Biotech Farms) ===
The Bio-Tech Farms are designed to house all high-value agro-ventures producing major agriculture products to include coconut, livestock and poultry, and tropical fruits and vegetables. This will complement the Asian Halal Centre to supply raw materials for its specialty items.

== List of investors ==
Name of Company	Project
1.) Globe Telecom Inc. (GTI)	In-Building Coverage Enhancement Project
2.) Seachamp International Export Corp. (SIEC)	Engaging in the processing, manufacturing and distribution of seafood products
3.) CTK Asia Rubber Corp. (CTK)	Engaging in the processing, manufacturing and export of technical specified natural rubber for rubber tires, development of natural rubber plantation and manufacturing of rubber application product
4.) Mi Casita Company Inc. (MCI)	Operating a restaurant and catering services
5.) Philippine Long Distance (PLDT)	Utilities Enterprise
6.) Ascent Feed Specialist Inc. (AFSI)	Manufacturing, preparing, processing, mixing and dealing of feeds, food stuff, grains and commodities of every description for poultry, livestock and all kinds of animal feeding. To conduct and carry on all business appertaining thereto and other activities appertaining to the operations of animal feeds, manufacturing plant and boiler facilities
7.) San Miguel Foods, Inc. (SMFI)	Warehousing operation and to conduct and carry on all business appertaining to the operation of an animal feeds manufacturing plant and boiler
8.) Artnature Philippines Inc. (INPI)	Establishing a wig / toupee making branch, to conduct ventilation process and carry on other activities pertaining thereto
9.) San Ramon Power, Inc. (SRPI)	To operate a 100 MW coal-fired fluidized bed boiler power plant within the Zamboecozone 2nd Industrial port facility
10.) Helping Hand Development Cooperative (HHDC)	To provide specific and/or specialized work/services to ANPI as covered by Service Agreement entered into on November 1, 2012
11.) Primewater Infrasture Corp. (PIC)	Establish a water treatment plant project and for the Bulk water supply to ZCWD
12.) Rowell Can Corporation	Warehousing of tin cans for canning factories
13.) PIC-Asia Pacific Sdn. Bhd.	To Establish an operations office to provide technical, management, and maintenance support services to SRPI's 100 MW coal-fired power plant
14.) New Traditions Agri farm and Trading	Agri-Industrial Enterprise
15.) A. Tung Chingco Manufacturing Corp. (ATC)	Warehousing of Ligo Sardines and other canned products
16.) Eco Bottling Enterprises (EBE)	Water Bottling Factory
17.) AML Fastfood (AML)	Operating a Canteen
18.) Leadership Manpower Services Inc. (LMSI)	Provide Manpower services to Artnature Philippines Inc.
19.) Gabmar Manpower Agency Inc.	Provider of manpower services to Seachamp Export International Corp.
20.) AHS Agri-Aqua Ventures	To establish Cacao Plantation and Nursery
21.) SA Geolab International	Establishing Soil-testing laboratory and services
22.) SungGwang Solar Power Engineering	To establish a 20Mw Solar farm
23.) Xiamen Kinsend Metal Tech Co.	TBD
