= Nicolas Torre =

Chief of the Philippine National Police in 2025

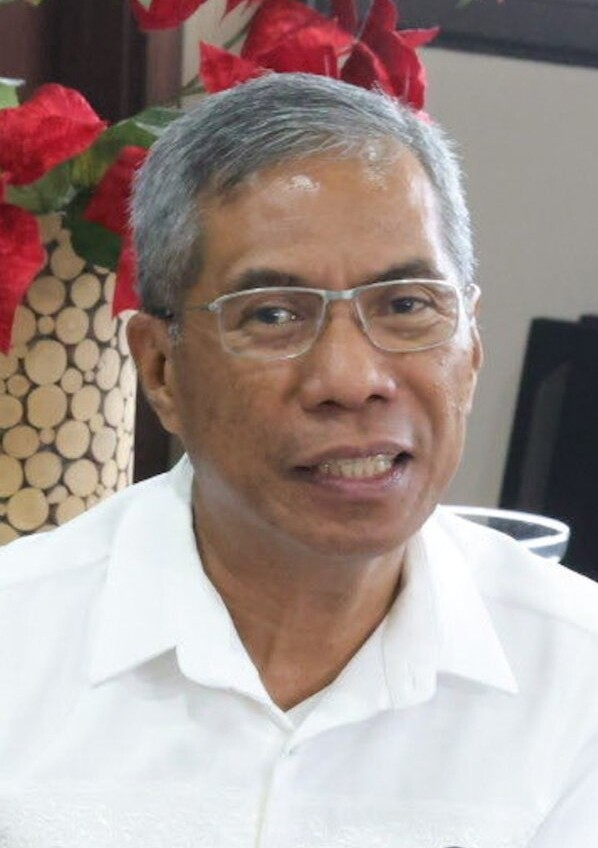
- Torre in 2026

31st Chief of the Philippine National Police
- In office June 2, 2025 – August 26, 2025
- President: Bongbong Marcos
- Preceded by: Rommel Marbil
- Succeeded by: Jose Melencio Nartatez

General Manager of the Metropolitan Manila Development Authority
- Incumbent
- Assumed office December 19, 2025
- President: Bongbong Marcos
- Preceded by: Procopio Lipana

Personal details
- Born: Nicolas Deloso Torre III; March 11, 1970 (age 56) Jolo, Sulu, Philippines
- Education: Philippine National Police Academy (BS)
- Police career
- Service: Philippine National Police
- Divisions: Criminal Investigation and Detection Group; PRO 11 (Davao Region); NCRPO; Philippine National Police Academy; PNP Communications and Electronics Service; Quezon City Police District; Police Regional Office (PRO) 3; Police Regional Office (PRO) 4B MIMAROPA; Western Samar PPO; Batangas Police Provincial Office; Pampanga Police Provincial Office
- Service years: 1993–2025
- Rank: Police General

Nicolas Deloso Torre III (born March 11, 1970) is a Filipino former police officer who served as the 31st chief of the Philippine National Police (PNP) from June 2025 until his removal by the National Police Commission (NAPOLCOM) in August that same year. He is the first Philippine National Police Academy (PNPA) graduate to hold the office. With a tenure of 85 days, he is also the shortest-serving chief of the PNP. Currently, he is serving as the general manager of the Metropolitan Manila Development Authority (MMDA) since December 2025.

Torre previously served as the chief of police in Samar, Quezon City, and Davao Region. In the last role, he led the police attempt to serve an arrest warrant against Pastor Apollo Quiboloy, founder and leader of the Kingdom of Jesus Christ church, who was charged with human trafficking. In March 2025, as Criminal Investigation and Detection Group (CIDG) chief, Torre arrested former president of the Philippines Rodrigo Duterte based on a warrant issued by the International Criminal Court (ICC) for alleged crimes against humanity. He was then appointed as PNP chief by President Bongbong Marcos in June, but was removed from office in August after he refused to obey NAPOLCOM's order to revise his reassignment of thirteen police officials, including his eventual successor Jose Melencio Nartatez.

== Early life and education ==
Nicolas Deloso Torre III was born on March 11, 1970, in Jolo, Sulu, and grew up in Koronadal, South Cotabato. His father, Rodolfo "Dolping" Molarto Torre, was a master sergeant of the Philippine Constabulary, while his mother, Julia Deloso, was a teacher. His parents were originally from Iloilo: his father was from Tigbauan, while his mother was from Dumangas. He is the eldest of five children, and the only one to grow up to become a police officer.

Nicolas Torre attended the Notre Dame of Marbel in his hometown for his elementary studies, and graduated as a valedictorian. At the Koronadal National Comprehensive High School, he graduated as a salutatorian. A beneficiary of a scholarship program by the Department of Science and Technology, Torre entered the Mapúa Institute of Technology's electronics and communications engineering program to accomplish the 72 prerequisite college academic units to be able to enroll in the Philippine National Police Academy (PNPA). He considered pursuing a career as an engineer instead but persisted with his original plan to enroll in the PNPA.

The elder Torre was assassinated in 1990 in Lutayan, Sultan Kudarat.

The younger Torre graduated from the PNPA in 1993 as part of the Tagapaglunsad Class.

== Career ==
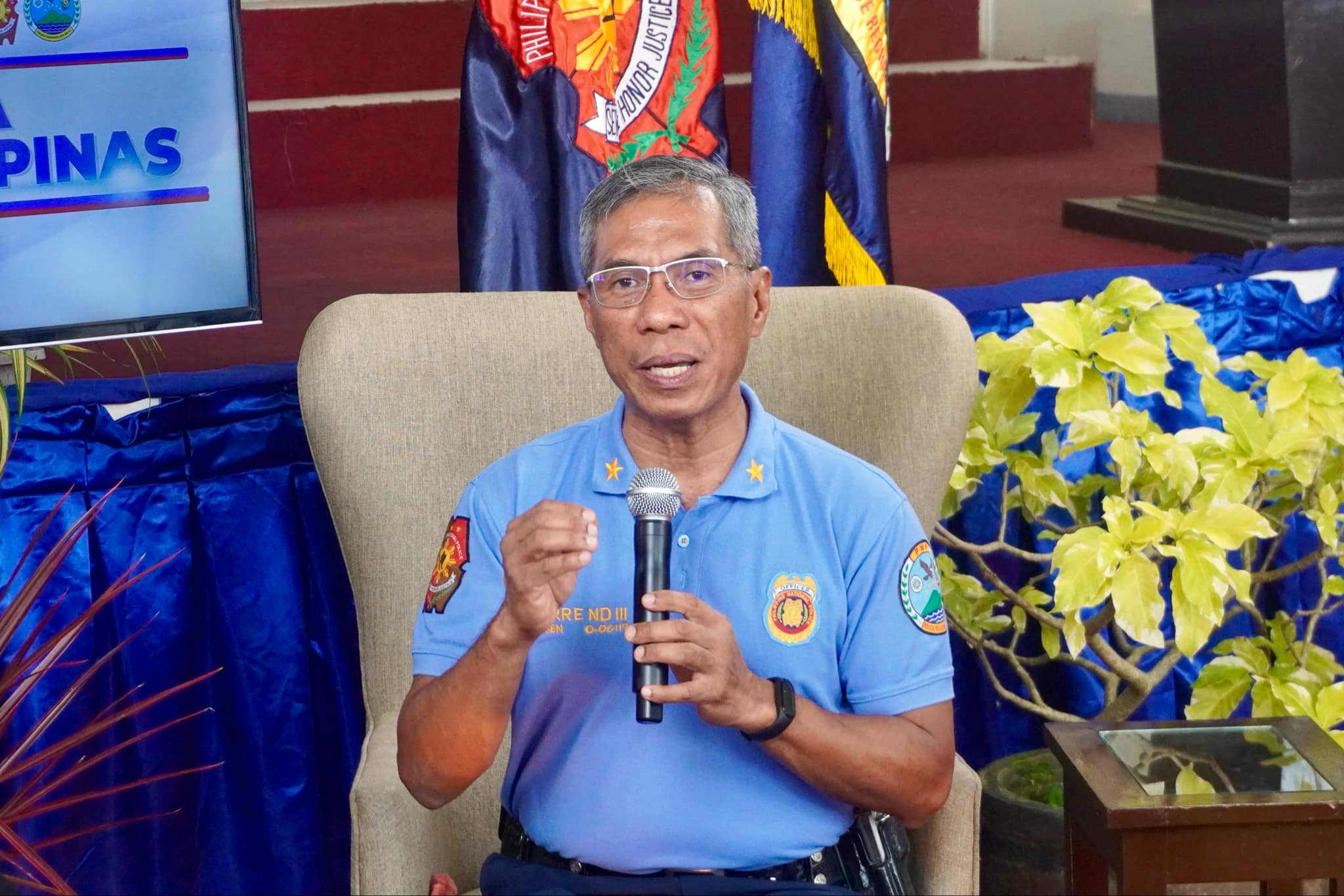
Torre as Director of PNP Police Regional Office 11.

=== Key positions ===
- Provincial Director, Batangas Police Provincial Office
- Provincial Director, Pampanga Police Provincial Office
- Provincial Director, Western Samar Police Provincial Office
- Deputy Director for Operations, Police Regional Office 4B MIMAROPA
- Deputy Director for Administration, Police Regional Office 3
- District Director, Quezon City Police District (QCPD)
- Director, PNP Communications and Electronics Service (PNP-CES)
- Deputy Director, Philippine National Police Academy (PNPA)
- Chief of Directorial Staff, National Capital Region Police Office (NCRPO)
- Deputy Director for Operations, National Capital Region Police Office (NCRPO)
- Regional Director, Police Regional Office 11
- Director, PNP-CIDG
- Chief, PNP

=== Early career ===
Torre was assigned at the Quezon City Police District sometime in the 2000s. In 2005, he led a demolition operation in Fairview to reclaim a private property allegedly occupied by armed persons and squatters. The police team, under Torre's command, was met with resistance and an hour-long shootout, resulting in the deaths of four individuals. Firearms and explosives were later recovered from the scene.

Torre served as the provincial director of Samar Provincial Police Office from 2017 to 2019. During his time as provincial director, he had a feud with Calbayog mayor Ronaldo Aquino. In 2018, he filed criminal cases against the mayor for libel and grave misconduct before the Ombudsman, and an administrative complaint before the National Police Commission seeking to remove the mayor's control over the local police.

Aquino was later killed in 2021 during an alleged shoot-out with Samar police. During a Senate investigation on the killing, a police officer claimed that Aquino's political rivals in collusion with the police, had falsely linked the mayor to the drug trade. The witness recalled being told to execute an affidavit accusing Aquino of being the protector of a police escort involved in illegal drugs, and afterwards, forwarding a photo of the affidavit to the then-police provincial director Torre.

He was declared persona non grata by the Calbayog City Council in a vote of six ayes, three nays, and one abstention. The reason of the council is because of his failure of leadership to fight criminality and joining in a partisan political activity during the early election campaign.

In January 2019, Torre was at the National Capital Region Police Office (NCRPO) in Metro Manila as regional director for operations.

=== Chief of Quezon City Police District ===
After his stint in NCRPO, he was intended to be appointed commandant of the PNPA, but was later assigned as chief of the Quezon City Police District (QCPD) on August 12, 2022. His stint was controversial due his hosting of a press conference for retired Patrolman (PO1) Wilfredo Gonzales, who was filmed gun-toting a cyclist at Welcome Rotonda. He appealed to the public for "compassion" and to "stop crucifying" Gonzales, but he later apologized for giving "VIP treatment" to Gonzales. Torre was also accused by the cyclist's lawyer Raymond Fortun that he texted the lawyer to dismiss the case against Gonzales. He later dismissed the accusations, and he resigned and replaced by Brigadier General Rederico Maranan.

=== PNP National Headquarters ===
He served as director of PNP Headquarters' Communications and Electronics Service (CES).

=== Davao Region Police Office ===
He was assigned to the Davao Regional Police Office (PRO-11) on June 16, 2024, as acting director. In his post, Torre attempted to implement a three-minute emergency response policy for police personnel in Davao City. Torre's reassignment of more than 100 police personnel in the regional police office led to Davao City Mayor Sebastian Duterte denouncing him for "disrupting peace" in Davao. and after questioning the accuracy of the city's crime data, Duterte threatened to slap him.

On August 20, 2024, Torre revealed during a hearing before the Senate Committee on Public Order and Dangerous Drugs that a Pasig trial court has issued a new alias warrant of arrest against Pastor Apollo Quiboloy, leader of the Kingdom of Jesus Christ (KOJC) church, which allows the PNP to continue its search of the KOJC compound in Davao City which had stalled since its initial June 10 operation. Torre had previously expressed his belief that Quiboloy was still in the compound, and encouraged him to surrender to avoid having his followers defend him at their own expense. By August 24, 2024, Torre began the renewed operation to arrest Quiboloy for qualified human trafficking along with four of his alleged accomplices. A two-week standoff occurred between the police and KOJC members at the church's compound in Davao City due to KOJC members attempting to obstruct police operations. Mayor Duterte questioned the legality of the police operation, while Senator Ronald dela Rosa, a former PNP chief, expressed opposition to its lengthened duration "at the expense of the freedom of movement of the persons inside". After the capture of Quiboloy on September 8, 2024, Quiboloy's lawyer Ferdinand Topacio attempted to argue that his client "voluntarily surrendered" to the Armed Forces of the Philippines, and was not arrested by the PNP.

=== CIDG ===
Torre was assigned as director of the Criminal Investigation and Detection Group (CIDG) on September 25, 2024. During his tenure, Torre led the inter-agency operation to arrest former president Rodrigo Duterte, codenamed Operation Pursuit, in response to an International Criminal Court (ICC) arrest warrant transmitted by Interpol. Duterte was apprehended upon arrival in Manila and transported to The Hague on March 11, 2025. Torre also briefly arrested and handcuffed former Executive Secretary Salvador Medialdea for alleged obstruction of justice, when the latter tried to block Duterte from boarding the plane and dared Torre to arrest him. Torre had planned the entire arrest operation beforehand upon being assigned the responsibility for Operation Pursuit, asking PNP officials to allow him to "succeed and fail on my plans. Because if I succeed, I succeed based on my plans. If I fail, I fail on my plans also, so there's no one else to blame but me."

In April 2025, Torre also directed the arrest of Russian-American vlogger Vitaly Zdorovetskiy, who was charged for his disruptive and inappropriate behavior towards Filipinos on his livestreams.

On July 30, 2025, the former 13th Division of the Court of Appeals released its July 21 decision deeming Torre and four other CIDG officers as accountable for the agency's negligence in the slow investigation into the disappearance of activist Felix Salaveria Jr. on August 23, 2024.

=== Chief of the Philippine National Police ===
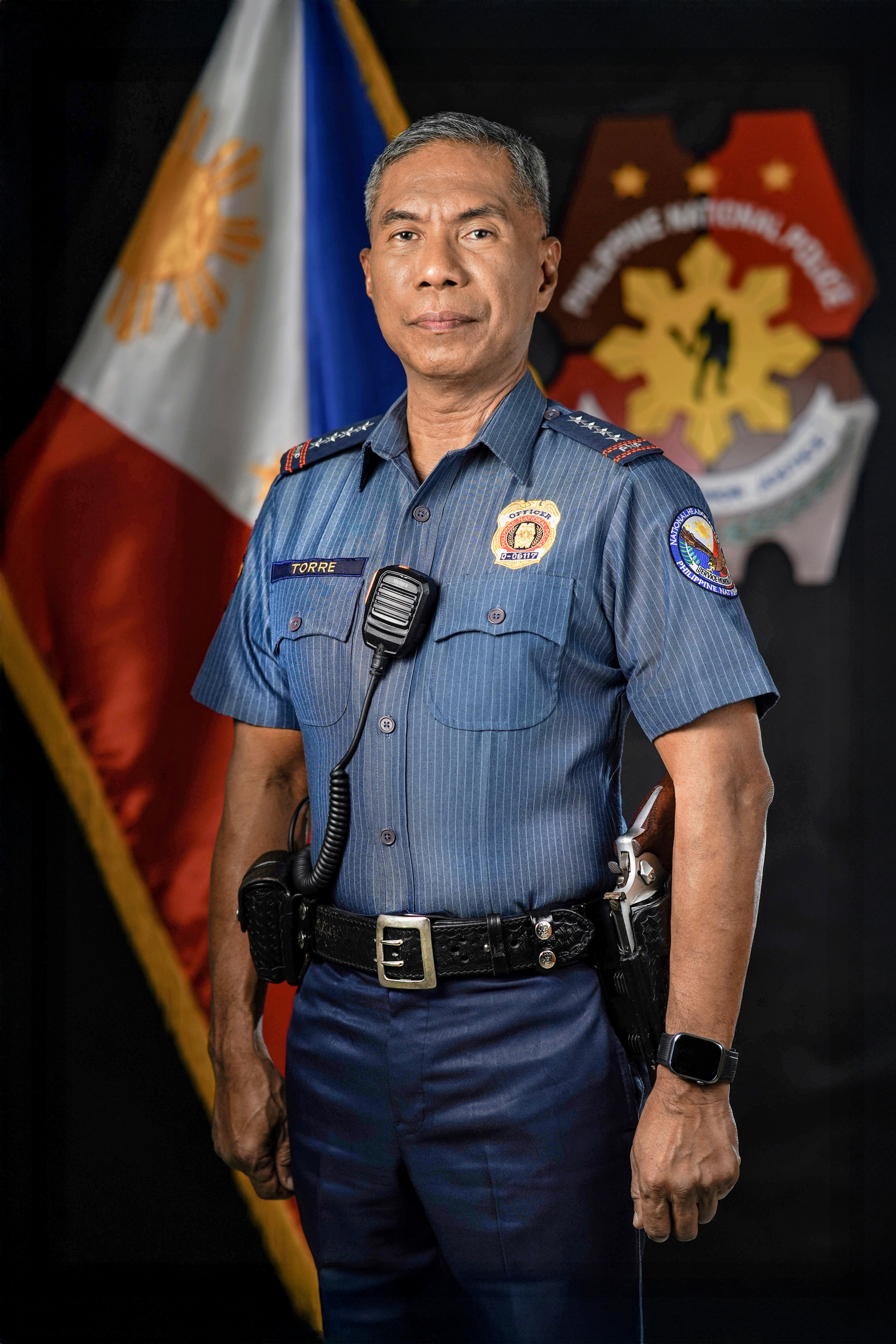
Official portrait, 2025

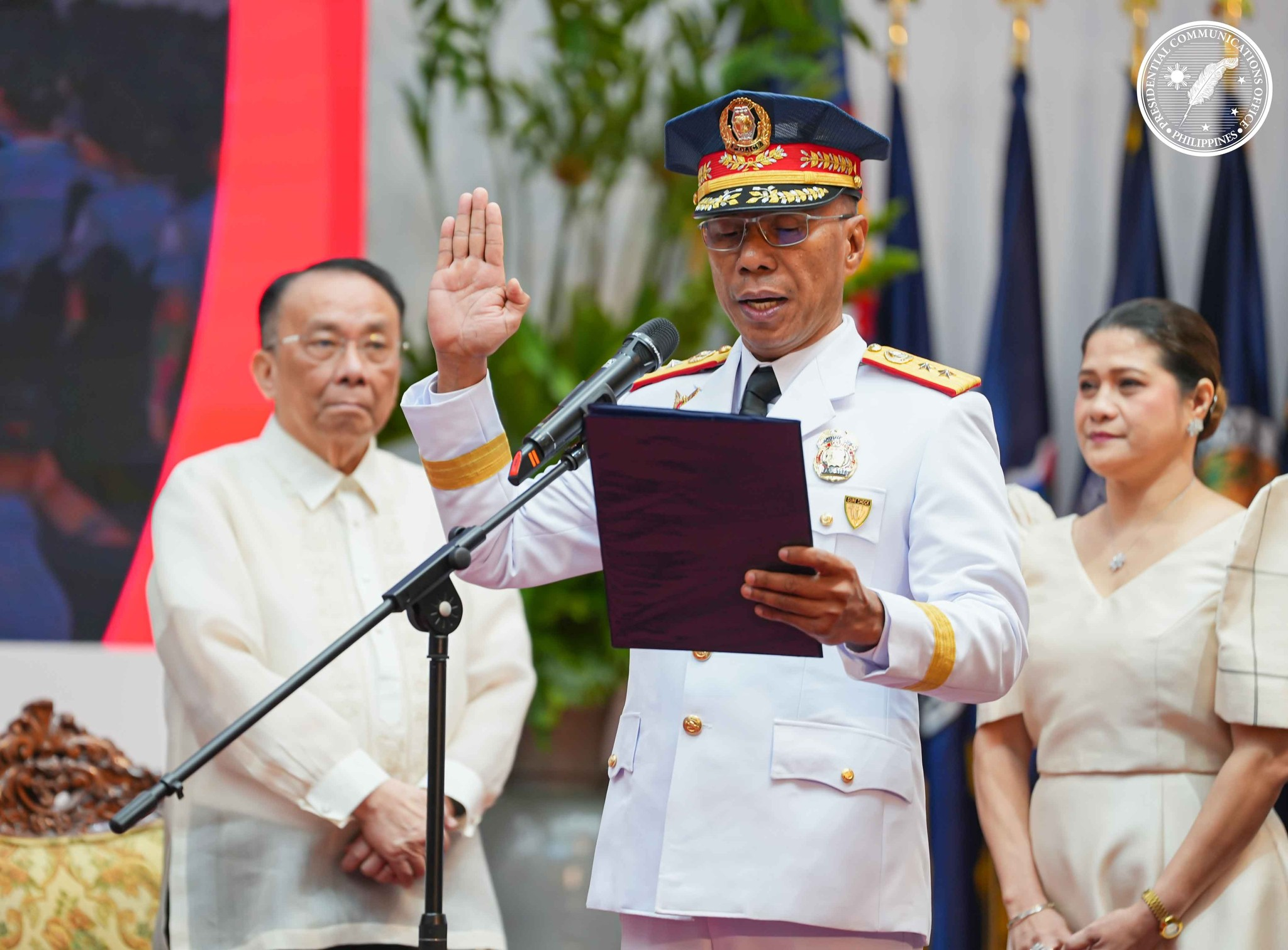
Torre take oath as new PNP chief on June 2, 2025

On May 29, 2025, President Bongbong Marcos chose Torre as the new PNP chief replacing Rommel Marbil. Torre is the first graduate of PNPA to be appointed as PNP Chief. The position has been previously filled by graduates from the Philippine Military Academy (PMA). He formally assumed office on June 2, 2025. Three days later, Torre began implementing a 5-minute response policy for PNP officials in Metro Manila. By June 9, Torre made an unprecedented courtesy visit to the Commission on Human Rights, where he affirmed the CHR's oversight function over the PNP by stating that "The CHR is our boss on the protection of human rights."

On July 20, 2025, Davao City acting mayor Sebastian Duterte on his Basta Dabawenyo podcast dared Torre to a fistfight after calling his three-minute policy an opportunity for police "harassment" in the city, with him calling Torre a "coward" and accusing him of kidnapping his father Rodrigo Duterte. Upon being informed of the dare by a UNTV reporter on July 23, Torre immediately accepted Duterte's challenge as an opportunity to hold a charity boxing match to raise funds for victims of recent floods. Torre later confirmed that the match would take place on July 27 at the Rizal Memorial Coliseum in Manila. However, Duterte later set conditions that Torre must persuade President Marcos to mandate hair follicle drug tests for all elected officials, with Duterte departing for Singapore on July 25 for a personal trip until July 29, stating it was long planned before the match and was approved by Interior and Local Government Secretary Jonvic Remulla on July 20. On July 27, Torre was declared the winner by default in the match after Duterte failed to appear.

Torre made a reorganization on August 6, 2025, which includes the reappointment of Deputy Chief for Administration Jose Melencio Nartatez as Area Police Command (APC) Western Mindanao commander. However, on August 14, the National Police Commission (NAPOLCOM) ran by concurrent interior secretary Jonvic Remulla ordered Torre to revise his reappointment modify the reassignment of 13 senior officers. The 18 regional directors of the PNP signed a manifesto in support of Torre and the chain of command in response to the NAPOLCOM order, without explicitly mentioning the directive itself.

Torre introduced a five-minute response policy. Under said policy the police is mandated to respond to a 911 emergency call made anywhere nationwide within five minutes.

On August 26, 2025, Torre was officially relieved as Chief of the Philippine National Police (PNP) through an order signed by Executive Secretary Lucas Bersamin on behalf of President Marcos The order, dated August 25, 2025, directed that Torre's relief was to take effect "immediately". The August 14 NAPOLCOM directive was among the factors for his removal. His tenure only lasted in 85 days, making him the most shortest-serving PNP Chief.

Former Deputy Chief Nartatez was appointed as Officer in Charge of the PNP. Torre filed a leave of absence.

=== Metro Manila Development Authority ===
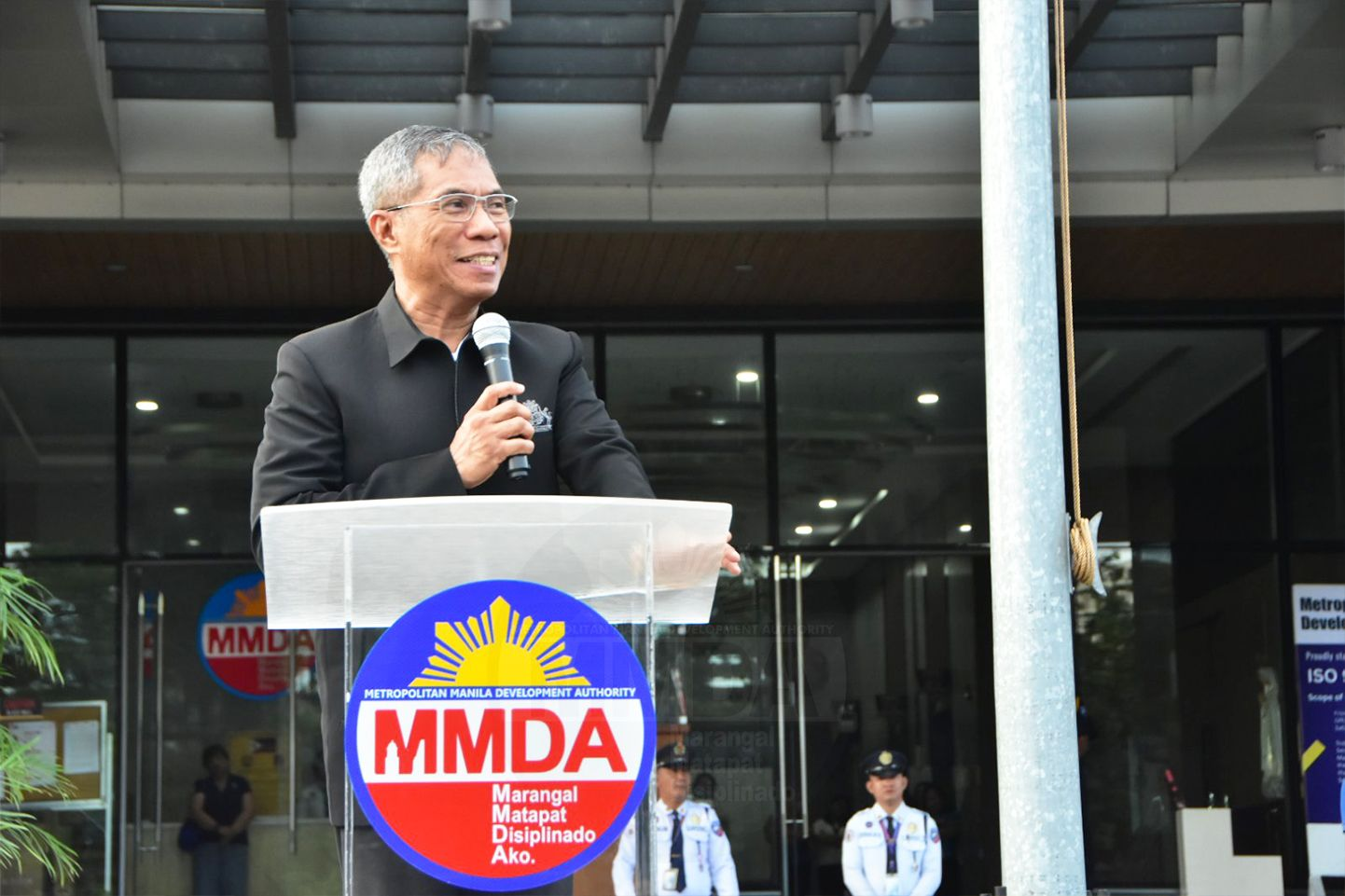
Torre as MMDA general manager

On December 19, 2025, Torre was appointed by President Bongbong Marcos as General Manager of the Metropolitan Manila Development Authority, replacing Procopio Lipana.

On August 23, 2026, Torre was involved in an incident along the EDSA Busway after the Land Transportation Office (LTO) apprehended a privately owned SUV being used by him that bore MMDA markings and a red government plate registered to a different MMDA vehicle. Torre acknowledged that he had the plate number copied from a MMDA truck and paid ₱14,000 in fines to the LTO. He said that he used the vehicle for security and official inspections and later apologized for the incident. Amid the investigation, MMDA chairperson Romando Artes said that Torre would remain in his post, as no suspension order has been issued against him. Torre would later take a one-month leave of absence starting September 8.

== Personal life ==
Torre is a former member of the Iglesia ni Cristo.
