= Philippine National Police Forensic Group =

Forensic division of the Philippine National Police

Forensic Group
- Abbreviation: FG

Agency overview
- Formed: September 2021
- Preceding agency: PNP Crime Laboratory (until 2021)

Jurisdictional structure
- National agency: Philippines
- Operations jurisdiction: Philippines
- General nature: Civilian police

Operational structure
- Headquarters: Manila
- Agency executives: PBGen. Benjamin Sembrano, Director (acting); PCol. Francisco A. Supe, Jr., Deputy Director for Administration; PCol. Ruel M. Vacaro, Deputy Director for Operations; NUP Pacifico B Talplacido V, Deputy Director for Forensic Research and Development; PCol. Pierre Paul Figueroa Carpip, Chief of Staff (acting)
- Parent agency: Philippine National Police

The Forensic Group is a police unit under the Philippine National Police (PNP) that supervises forensic-related procedures.

== History ==
The Forensic Group was formed in September 2021, by the General Orders Number DPL-20-32, pursuant to Napolcom Resolution No. 2021-1275. It replaced and renamed the old PNP Crime Laboratory. The Forensic Group's world-class forensic facilities and offices were presented in November of the same year.

Police Brigadier General Belli B. Tamayo was its first director.

== Role ==
The Forensic Group provides scientific investigation and technical support to PNP offices, other investigative agencies, and the public through forensic examinations, field work, scene-of-crime-operations, as well as training and research.

They also provide services on aspects such as autopsy, DNA examination, drug test, examination of altered or erased documents, counterfeit bills and fingerprinting.

== Organization ==
- Director
- Deputy Director for Administration
- Deputy Director for Operations
- Deputy Director for Forensic Research and Development
- Chief of Staff
- Administrative and Resource Management Division
- Operations Management Division

Technical Divisions

- DNA Laboratory Division
- Polygraphy Division
- Physical Identification Division
- Scene of the Crime Operations Division
- Forensic Photography Division
- Firearms Identification Division
- Chemistry Division
- Fingerprint Identification Division
- Medico Legal Division
- Questioned Document Examination Division

Regional Forensic Units:

- Regional Forensic Unit 1
- Regional Forensic Unit 2
- Regional Forensic Unit 3
- Regional Forensic Unit 4A
- Regional Forensic Unit 4B
- Regional Forensic Unit 5
- Regional Forensic Unit 6
- Regional Forensic Unit 7
- Regional Forensic Unit 8
- Regional Forensic Unit 9
- Regional Forensic Unit 10
- Regional Forensic Unit 11
- Regional Forensic Unit 12
- Regional Forensic Unit 13
- Regional Forensic Unit BAR
- Regional Forensic Unit CAR
- Regional Forensic Unit NCR
- Regional Forensic Unit NIR

== List of directors ==
Name	Term	Ref.
PBGEN Belli B. Tamayo	2021 – 2023	
PBGEN Constancio T Chinayog Jr.	2023 – October 4, 2024	
PBGEN Benjamin Sembrano	October 4, 2024 – present	(acting)
