= Philippine National Police =

Police force of the Philippines

Philippine National Police Pambansang Pulisya ng Pilipinas
- Insignia and uniform patch

- Badge

- Flag
- Abbreviation: PNP
- Motto: To Serve and Protect. Service, Honor, Justice.

Agency overview
- Formed: January 29, 1991; 35 years ago
- Preceding agencies: Philippine Constabulary (August 18, 1901 – January 29, 1991); Integrated National Police (August 8, 1975 – January 29, 1991)
- Annual budget: ₱193.24 billion (2023) (US$3.92 billion)

Jurisdictional structure
- National agency: Philippines
- Operations jurisdiction: Philippines

Operational structure
- Headquarters: Camp Crame, Quezon City
- Police officers: 218,139 (2024)
- Agency executives: PGEN Jose Melencio C. Nartatez Jr., Chief, PNP; PLTGEN Wilson Joseph F. Lopez, Deputy Chief for Administration; PLTGEN Neri Vincent D. Ignacio, Deputy Chief for Operations; PMGEN Redrico A. Maranan (Acting), Chief for Directorial Staff; PBGEN Allen Rae F. Co, Public Information Officer and Spokesperson
- Parent agency: Department of the Interior and Local Government via National Police Commission

Website
- pnp.gov.ph

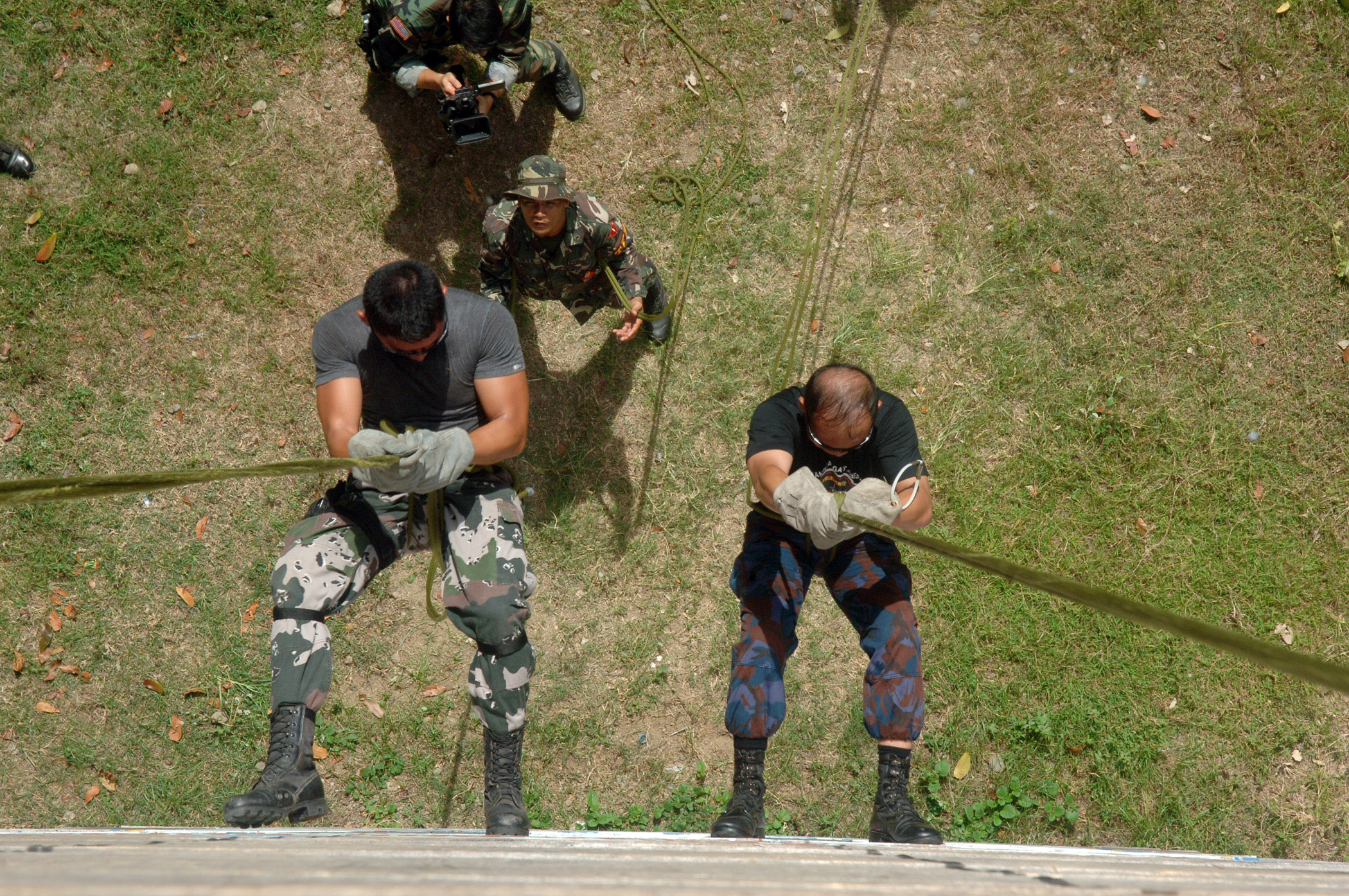
Two members of the PNP rappel down a tower during a joint U.S.-AFP-PNP Subject Matter Expert Exchange (SMEE).

The Philippine National Police (PNP; Filipino: Pambansang Pulisya ng Pilipinas) is the national police force of the Philippines. Its national headquarters is located at Camp Crame in Bagong Lipunan ng Crame, Quezon City. Currently, it has approximately 228,000 personnel to police a population in excess of 100 million.

The agency is administered and controlled by the National Police Commission and is part of the Department of the Interior and Local Government (DILG). Local police officers are operationally controlled by city or municipal mayors. DILG, on the other hand, organizes, trains and equips the PNP for the performance of police functions as a police force that is national in scope and civilian in character.

The PNP was formed on January 29, 1991, when the Philippine Constabulary and the Integrated National Police were merged pursuant to Republic Act 6975 of 1990.

== History ==
=== Creation after martial law ===
Until January 1991, the Philippines did not have a civilian national police force, and instead had the Philippine Constabulary under the Armed Forces of the Philippines (AFP) and city and municipal police organized under the Integrated National Police, which was likewise nationalized and integrated under the command of the military under martial law in 1975.

The need to assert civilian control of the military was a reform agenda which began being addressed almost as soon as Ferdinand Marcos was deposed by the 1986 People Power Revolution; within a year of Marcos' ouster, the 1987 Constitution of the Philippines enshrined the principle of civilian supremacy over the military. This was because of broad local and international consensus that "human rights abuses became rampant" during the dictatorship, with Philippine Constabulary units such as the Metrocom Intelligence and Security Group (MISG), and the 5th Constabulary Security Unit (5CSU), identified with many particular cases. These units had been associated with acts of intimidation and violence against media entities, corporate management, and opposition groups.

The recommendations of the Davide Commission in 1990 thus included the dissolution of the Philippine Constabulary as a service under the AFP. It was determined that a new civilian Philippine National Police was to be formed by merging the Integrated National Police into the Philippine Constabulary, with the PC forming the basis as it had the more developed infrastructure. The PC was then removed from the Ministry of National Defense and eventually civilianized, as part of the Department of the Interior and Local Government, through attrition and recruitment of new personnel.

Passed on December 13, 1990, Republic Act No. 6975, the Department of the Interior and Local Government Act of 1990 paved the way for a new era for Philippine law enforcement as the law ordered the total merger of both the Philippine Constabulary and the Integrated National Police and formally created the Philippine National Police.

=== Later reforms and reorganization ===
R.A. 6975 was further amended by R.A. 8551, the Philippine National Police Reform and Reorganization Act of 1998, and by R.A. 9708.

R.A. 8551 envisioned the PNP to be a community- and service-oriented agency and included the creation of the Internal Affairs Service of Philippine National Police.

On June 14, 2019, the PNP announced that the Counter-Intelligence Task Force will be replaced with the Integrity Monitoring and Enforcement Group.

== Organization ==
=== Leadership ===
- Commander-in-Chief: Pres. Ferdinand R. Marcos Jr.
- Secretary of the Interior and Local Government (SILG) and Chairman of the National Police Commission (NAPOLCOM): Hon. Juanito Victor C. Remulla
  - Undersecretary for Peace and Order, DILG: Nestor B. Sanares
  - Vice Chairman and Executive Officer, NAPOLCOM: Atty. Rafael Vicente R. Calinisan
- Chief of the Philippine National Police (C, PNP): PGen. Jose Melencio C. Nartatez Jr.
- The Deputy Chief for Administration of the Philippine National Police (TDCA, PNP): PLtGen. Wilson Joseph F. Lopez
- The Deputy Chief for Operations of the Philippine National Police (TDCO, PNP): PLtGen. Neri Vincent D. Ignacio
- The Chief of the Directorial Staff of the Philippine National Police (TDCS, PNP): PMGen. Redrico A. Maranan (Acting)
- Public Information Officer/Spokesperson of the Philippine National Police (PIO, PNP): PBGen. Allen Rae F. Co

=== Internal Affairs Service ===
The PNP created a national Internal Affairs Service (IAS) in June 1999. It is an organization within the structure of the PNP and one of its tasks is to help the Chief PNP institute reforms to improve the image of the police force through assessment, analysis and evaluation of the character and behavior of the PNP personnel. It is headed by the Inspector General.

=== National Operations Center (NOC) ===
The National Operations Center (NOC) is at Camp Crame. Chief Superintendent Constante Azares Jr., chief of the PNP-NOC, explained that "the NOC is the hub and nerve of this facility."

=== Operational units ===
The following operational units exist within the PNP.

- Anti-Cybercrime Group (ACG) – responsible for the investigation of cybercrime, conducting forensic analyses on seized computers and digital evidence, and for assessing vulnerabilities in public and private IT infrastructure.
- Anti-Kidnapping Group (AKG) – responsible in addressing kidnapping menace in the country and in handling hostage situations.
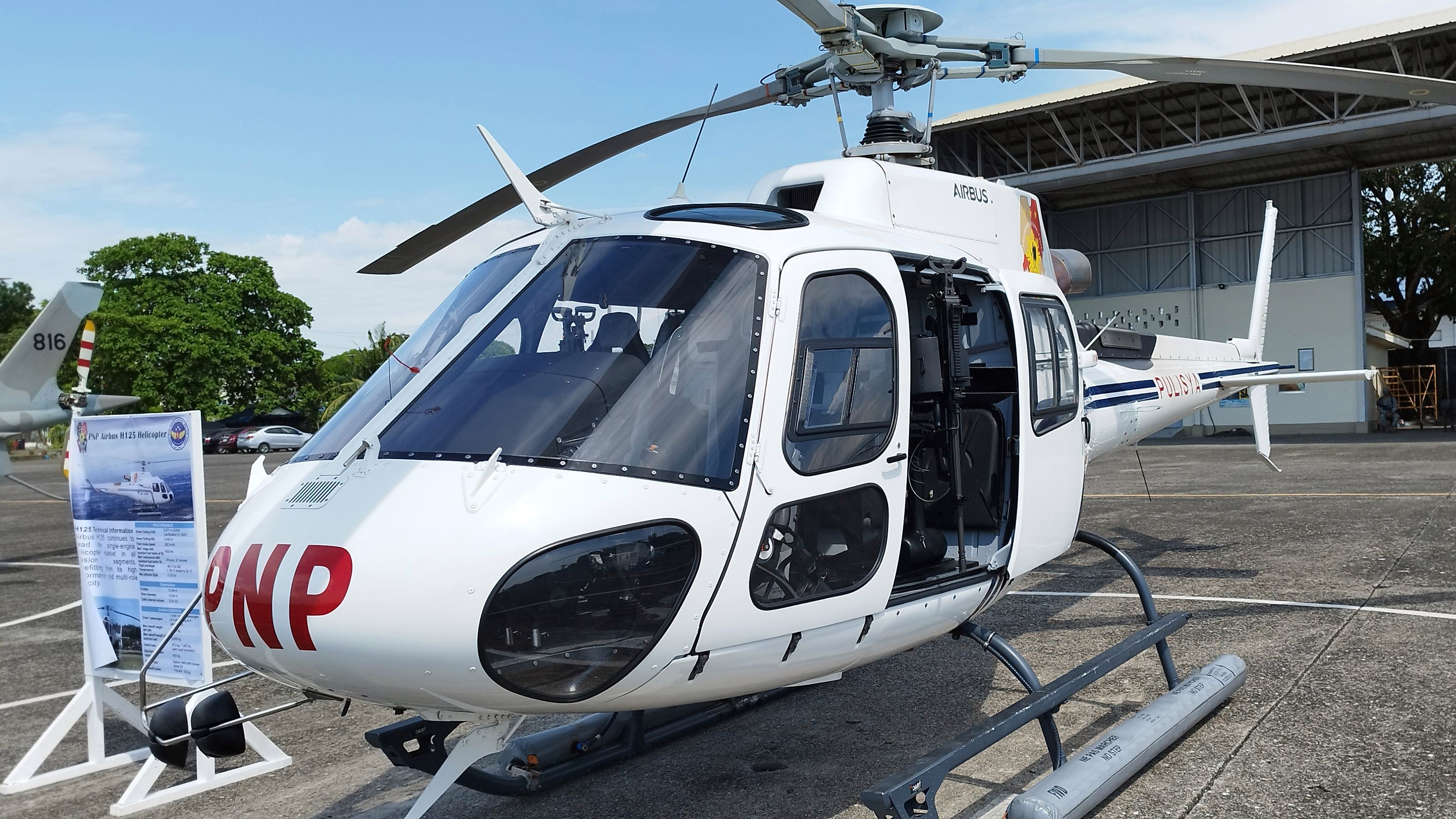
- AIRBUS H125 Helicopter of the Philippine National Police
  Aviation Security Group (AVSEGROUP) – responsible for the security of Philippine airports against threats to civil aviation.
- Civil Security Group (CSG) – responsible for the regulation of all organized private detectives, watchmen, security agencies, and company guard forces. It also supervises the licensing and registration of firearms and explosives.
- Criminal Investigation and Detection Group (CIDG) – responsible for monitoring, investigating, and prosecuting all crimes involving economic sabotage, and other crimes of such magnitude and extent as to indicate their commission by highly placed or professional criminal syndicates and organizations. It also conducts organized crime control and handles all major cases involving violations of the penal code or other laws assigned.
- Drug Enforcement Group (DEG) – responsible for the prevention and control of illegal drugs in support of the Philippine Drug Enforcement Agency. It is formerly known as the PNP Anti Illegal Drugs Group.
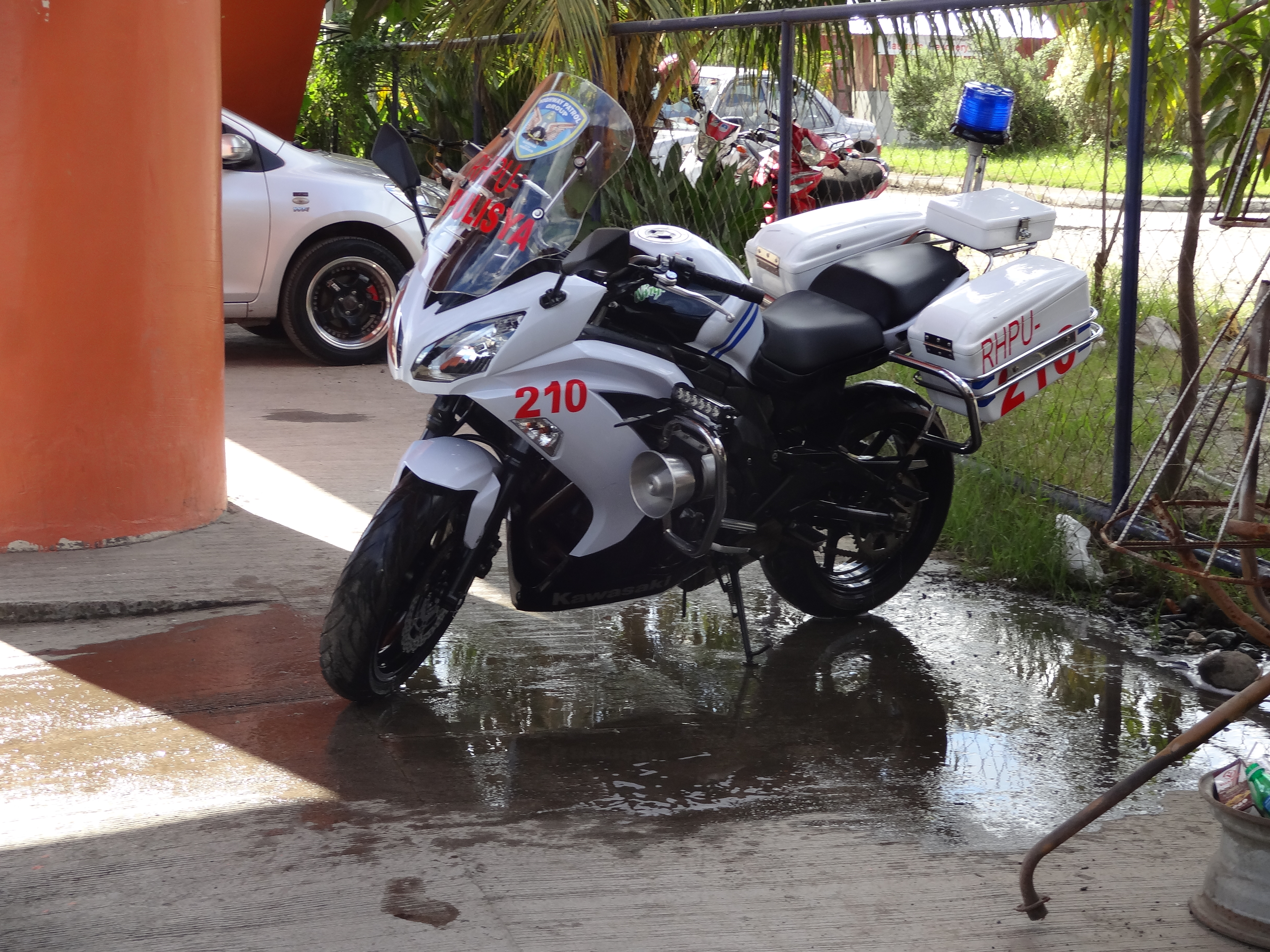
- Highway Patrol Group's Kawasaki Ninja 650R No. 210 of PNP
  The Highway Patrol Group (HPG) – responsible for enforcing traffic laws and motor vehicle registration and regulation and assisting the Land Transportation Office and is also part of the LTFRB#I-ACT!. This group is rarely seen outside of highly urbanized areas or in any provincial areas however.
- Integrity Monitoring and Enforcement Group (IMEG) – responsible for conducting intelligence build-up and law enforcement operations against PNP personnel who are involved in any illegal activities such as drug trafficking, human trafficking, financial crimes, cybercrime, malversation, graft and corrupt practices, security violations, and others. It replaced the Counter-Intelligence Task Force (CITF).
- Intelligence Group (IG) – responsible for intelligence and counter-intelligence.
- Forensic Group (FG) – responsible for carrying out different forensic services and scientific investigations. Known previously as the Crime Laboratory (CL), it includes the Scene of the Crime Operations (SOCO) division.
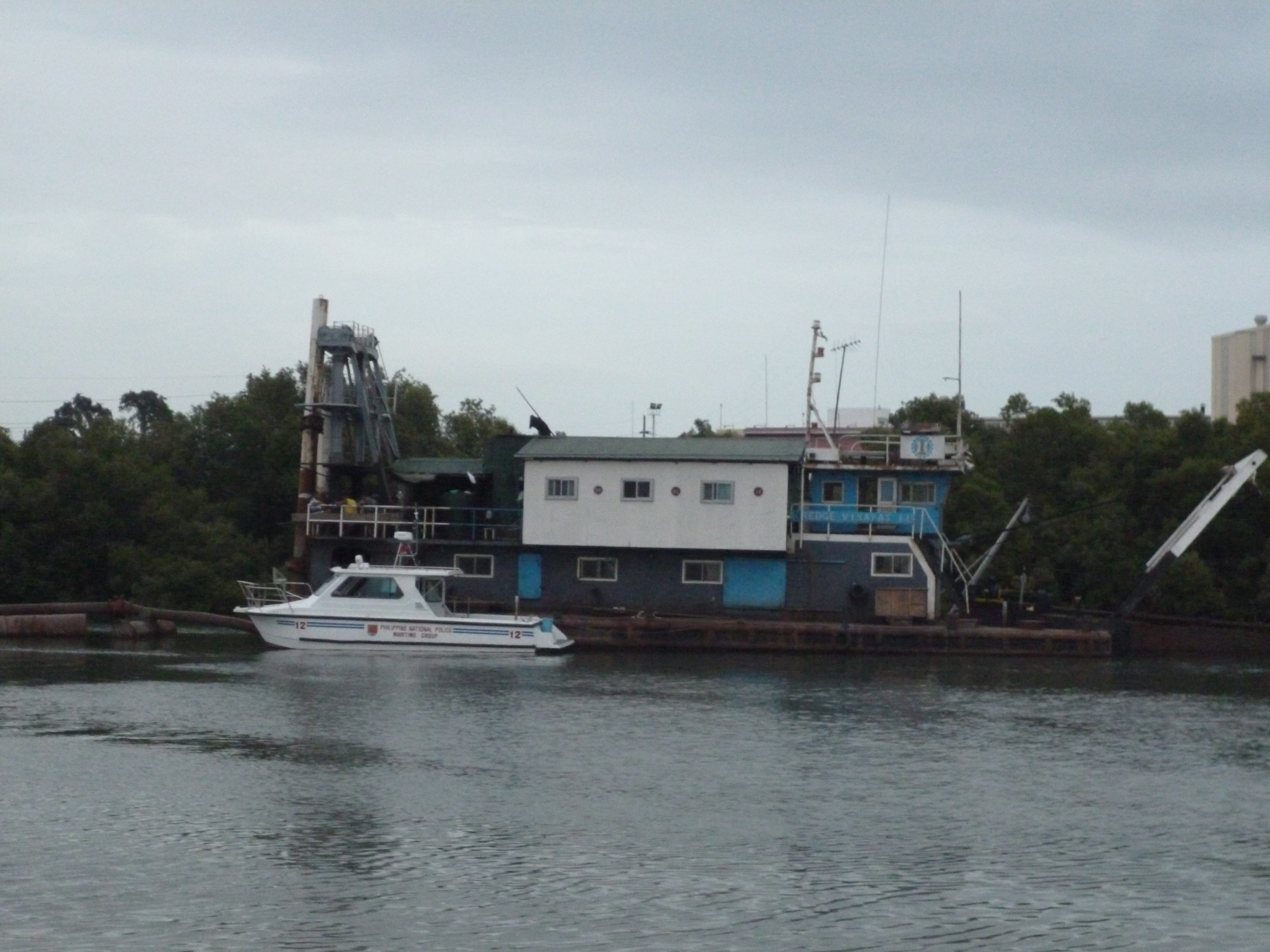
- Philippine National Police boat on the Iloilo River, Iloilo City
  Maritime Group (MG) – responsible for performing all police functions over Philippine territorial waters, lakes, and rivers and along coastal areas, including ports, harbors, and small islands for the security and the safety of the maritime environment.
- Police Security and Protection Group (PSPG) – responsible for the security of vital government installations, government officials, visiting dignitaries and private individuals authorized to be given protection. It also supports the Presidential Security Group in protecting the president and their family.
- Special Action Force (SAF) – a mobile strike force or a reaction unit to augment regional, provincial, municipal and city police force for civil disturbance control, internal security operations, hostage-taking rescue operations, search and rescue in times of natural calamities, disasters and national emergencies and other special police operations such as anti-hijacking, anti-terrorism, and explosives and ordnance disposal.
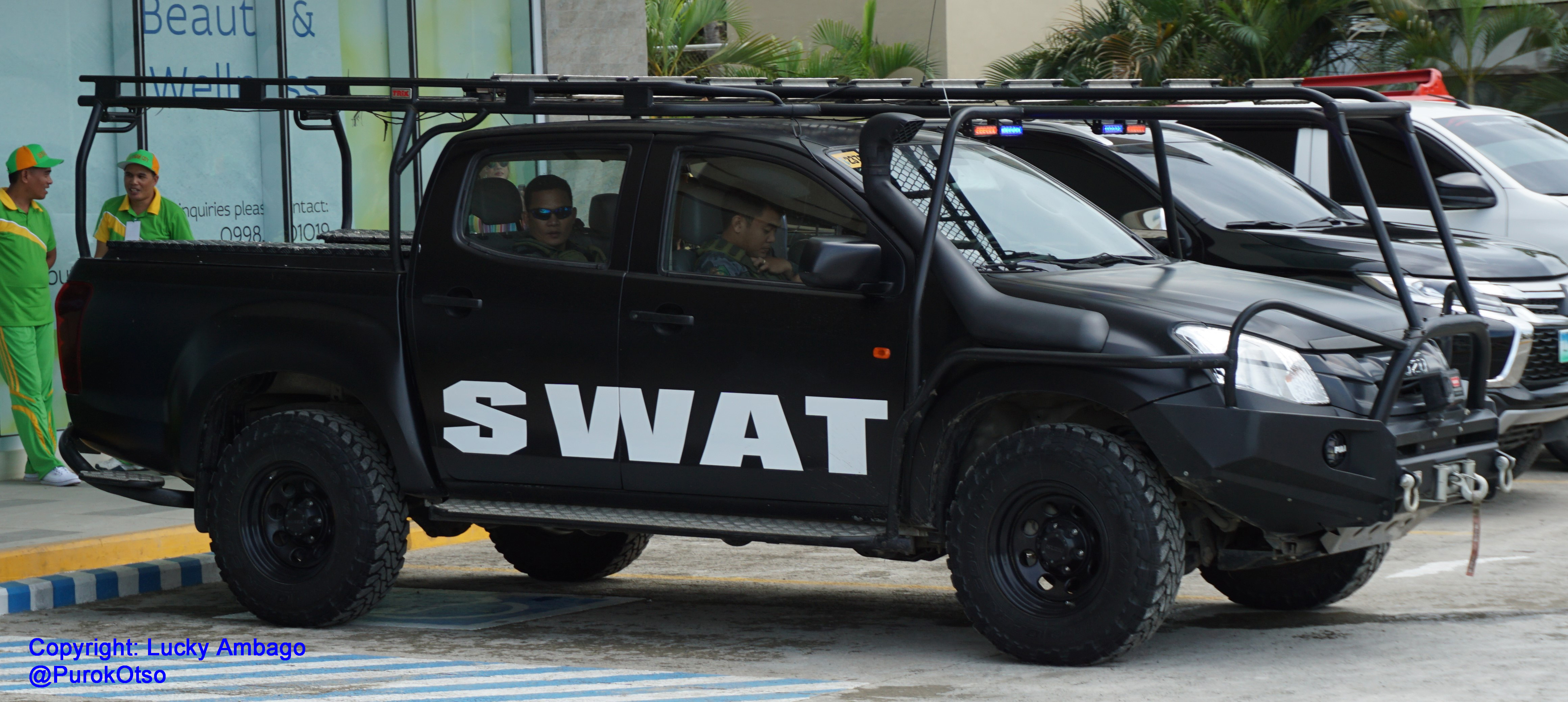
- Isuzu D-Max Special weapons and Tactics Vehicle of PNP
  PNP Air Unit (AU) – a highly specialized police unit specializing in providing air support to the entire PNP. It is staffed by a pool of professional, licensed and experienced pilots and aircraft mechanics. Once a part of Special Action Force.
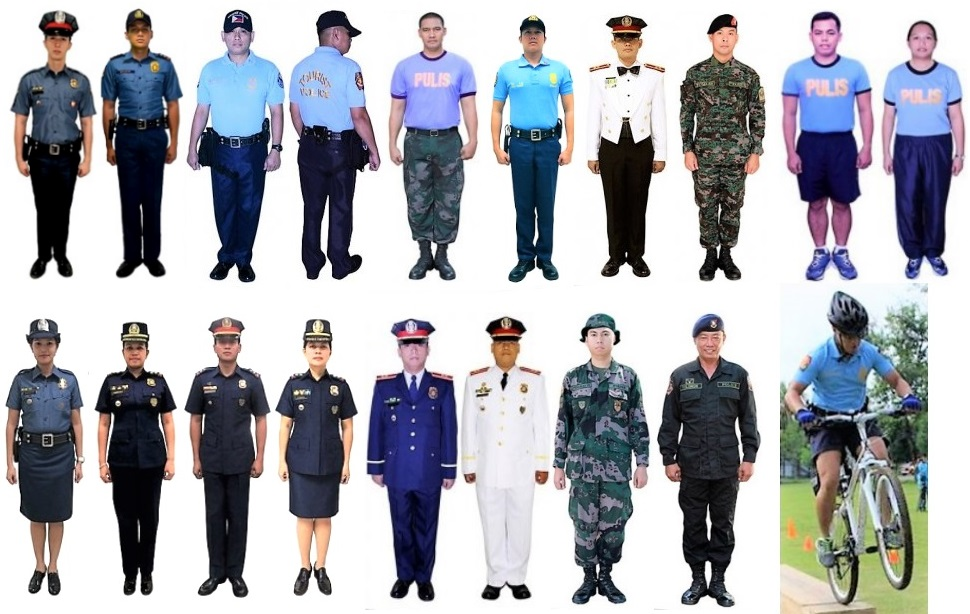
  Uniforms of the Philippine National Police.

=== Philippine National Police Academy ===
The Philippine National Police Academy is located at Camp Gen. Mariano N. Castañeda, Silang, Cavite and is the premier training academy for the Philippine National Police, Bureau of Jail Management & Penology and Bureau of Fire Protection.

=== Regional offices ===
Map of the PNP Police Regional Offices (new seal)

Police Regional Offices (PROs) manage and administer district offices, provincial and city police offices, mobile force battalions, national support units, police stations, and precincts within the various regions of the Philippines. Each unit exercises independent control over all police units within their areas of operation and attached units of the PNP National Headquarters are ordered to assist these Regional Offices. PROs are under the supervision of the Area Police Commands except the National Capital Region Police Office.

Current Seal	Regional Offices	Area of Responsibility	Provincial/City/District Offices	Regional Director
	National Capital Region Police Office (NCRPO)	National Capital Region – Metro Manila	5 (All District Offices)	PBGEN Christopher N. Abrahano (Acting)
	Police Regional Office Cordillera (PRO COR)	Cordillera Administrative Region	7 (6 Provincials, 2 Cities)	PBGEN Noel B. Vallo
	Police Regional Office 1 (PRO1)	Region 1 – Ilocos Region	4 (All Provincial Offices)	PBGEN Crisaleo R. Tolentino
	Police Regional Office 2 (PRO2)	Region 2 – Cagayan Valley	6 (5 Provincials, 4 Cities)	PBGEN Mariano C. Rodriguez
	Police Regional Office 3 (PRO3)	Region 3 – Central Luzon	9 (7 Provincials, 2 Cities)	PBGEN Jess B. Mendez
	Police Regional Office 4A (PRO4A)	Region IV-A – Calabarzon	5 (All Provincial Offices)	PBGEN Dominic L. Baccay
	Police Regional Office Mimaropa (PRO4B)	Mimaropa – Southwestern Tagalog Region	6 (5 Provincials, 1 City)	PBGEN Christopher R. Dela Cruz
	Police Regional Office 5 (PRO5)	Region V – Bicol Region	7 (6 Provincials, 1 City)	PBGEN Randy Glenn G. Silvio
	Police Regional Office 6 (PRO6)	Region VI – Western Visayas	6 (5 Provincials, 1 City)	PBGEN Randulf T. Tuaño
	Police Regional Office Negros Island Region (PRO NIR)	Negros Island Region	4 (3 Provincials, 1 City)	PBGEN Rudecindo L. Reales
	Police Regional Office 7 (PRO7)	Region VII – Central Visayas	7 (4 Provincials, 3 Cities)	PBGEN Rogelio Z. Raymundo Jr.
	Police Regional Office 8 (PRO8)	Region VIII – Eastern Visayas	8 (6 Provincials, 2 Cities)	PBGEN Romano V. Cardiño
	Police Regional Office 9 (PRO9)	Region IX – Zamboanga Peninsula	4 (3 Provincials, 1 City)	PBGEN Elmer E. Ragay
	Police Regional Office 10 (PRO10)	Region X – Northern Mindanao	7 (5 Provincials, 2 Cities)	PBGEN Nestor C. Babagay Jr.
	Police Regional Office 11 (PRO11)	Region XI – Davao Region	7 (5 Provincials, 1 City, 1 District)	PBGEN Benigno L. Guzman
	Police Regional Office 12 (PRO12)	Region XII – Soccsksargen / Bangsamoro barangays in North Cotabato	5 (4 Provincials, 1 City)	PBGEN Alan B. Manibog
	Police Regional Office 13 (PRO13)	Region XIII – Caraga	6 (5 Provincials, 1 City)	PBGEN Rolindo M. Suguilon
	Police Regional Office Bangsamoro Autonomous Region (PRO BAR)	BARMM – Bangsamoro Autonomous Region in Muslim Mindanao and Cotabato City / Excluding Bangsamoro barangays in North Cotabato	7 (6 Provincials, 1 City)	PBGEN Christopher M. Abecia

==== District Offices ====
District Offices	Area of Responsibility	Regional Office	District Director
Eastern Police District (EPD)	Mandaluyong, Marikina, Pasig, San Juan	NCRPO	PBGEN Roman C. Arugay
Manila Police District (MPD)	City of Manila	NCRPO	PBGEN Arnold C. Santiago
Northern Police District (NPD)	Caloocan, Malabon, Navotas, Valenzuela	NCRPO	PBGEN Benliner L. Capili
Quezon City Police District (QCPD)	Quezon City	NCRPO	PBGEN Christopher F. Olazo
Southern Police District (SPD)	Las Piñas, Makati, Muntinlupa, Parañaque, Pateros, Pasay, Taguig	NCRPO	PBGEN Rodel A. Pastor

== Rank structure ==
=== Full set of ranks ===
Per the current (2019) rank system, the National Police has no rank holders of Second Lieutenant, Technical Sergeant, Sergeant and Patrolman First Class.

Insignia	Rank
Commissioned Officers
	Police General (PGEN)
	Police Lieutenant General (PLTGEN)
	Police Major General (PMGEN)
	Police Brigadier General (PBGEN)
	Police Colonel (PCOL)
	Police Lieutenant Colonel (PLTCOL)
	Police Major (PMAJ)
	Police Captain (PCPT)
	Police Lieutenant (PLT)
Non-Commissioned Officers
	Police Executive Master Sergeant (PEMS)
	Police Chief Master Sergeant (PCMS)
	Police Senior Master Sergeant (PSMS)
	Police Master Sergeant (PMSg)
	Police Staff Sergeant (PSSg)
	Police Corporal (PCpl)
	Patrolman / Patrolwoman (Pat)

== Reforms ==
The PNP is one of the "core security actors" that are the focus of security sector governance and reform in the Philippines, which involves civilianizing, professionalizing, modernizing, and capacitating the Philippine government's security institutions to align them good governance and to principles such as human rights, freedom of information, and the rule of civilian law. This has been a continuing process since the establishment of the Fifth Philippine Republic after the 1986 People Power Revolution, before the concept had even been fully defined internationally in the 1990s. The creation of the PNP itself, merging and replacing the PC and the INP, was an early and major step towards civilianization of the Philippine security sector.

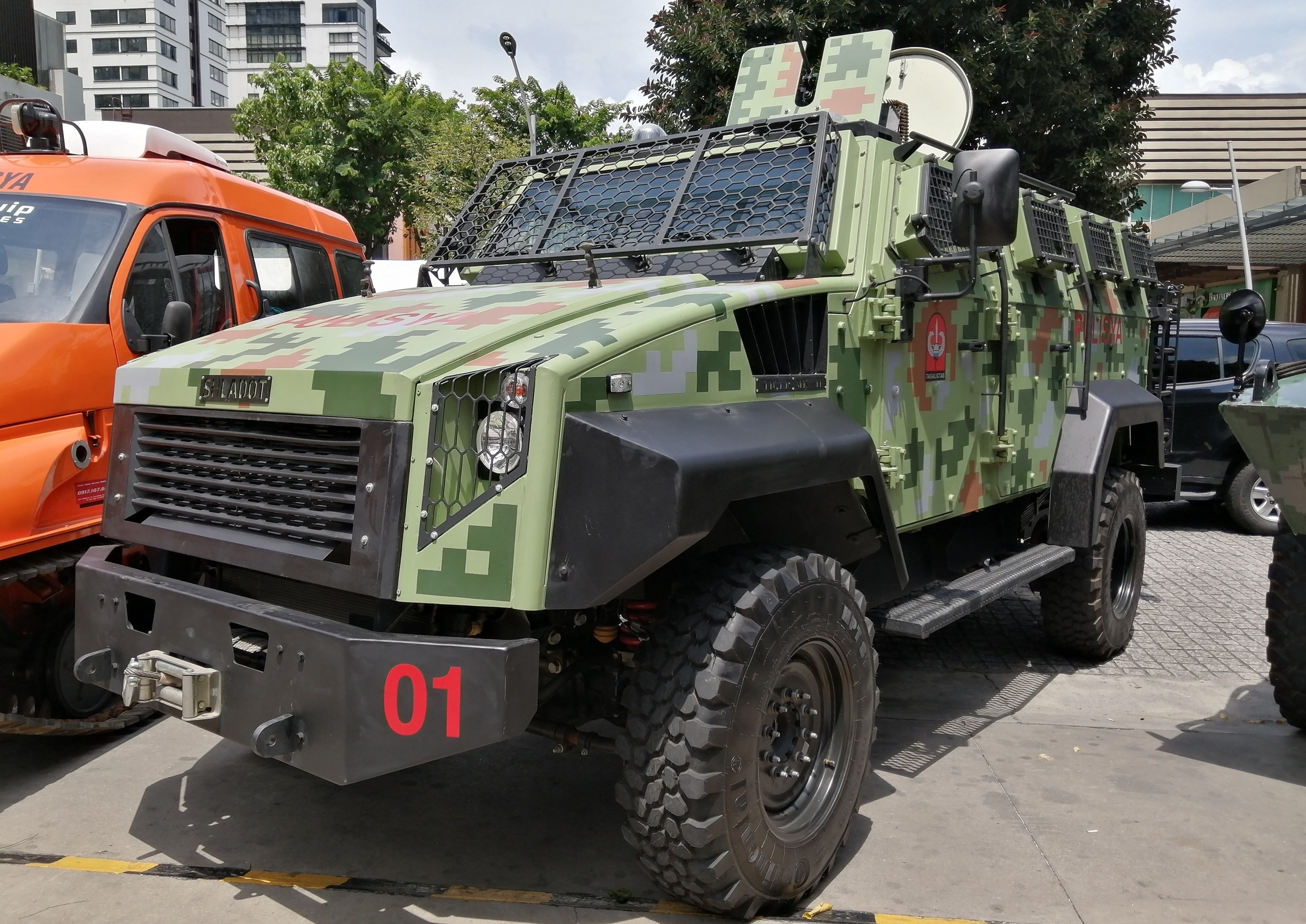
Shladot Tiger Mark II All Terrain Combat Vehicle of the PNP-Special Action Force (SAF)

== Controversies ==
=== Manila blackmail incident ===
A blackmail case occurred in Binondo, Manila when police officers abducted and blackmailed seven Chinese citizens suspected of drug trafficking on December 30, 1998. After many months of detainment and torture, two Hong Kong residents were killed when the ransom money was not paid. One police superintendent who knew of the operation was also killed.

=== Euro Generals scandal ===
The Euro Generals scandal involves Eliseo de la Paz and several Philippine National Police officials who went to Russia in October 2008 to attend an Interpol conference. De la Paz was detained for carrying a large sum of undeclared money. A House panel investigating the scandal concluded that the six police officials who attended the conference had made the trip without authorization. In 2010, the Office of the Ombudsman filed graft charges against twelve former and active ranking PNP officials for their alleged involvement in the incident.

=== Parañaque shootout ===
On December 5, 2008, ten suspected criminals, one policeman, and five civilians, a total of 16 people, including a seven-year-old girl, were killed in a shootout in Parañaque. Several others were wounded, including a ranking officer of the Highway Patrol Group, two members of the Special Action Force, a village watchman, and a security guard, said Director Leopoldo Bataoil, head of the Metro Manila regional police. The criminals belonged to a Waray-Waray gang and were armed with M16 rifles fitted with grenade launchers.

The head of the Internal Affairs Service of the PNP said, "We failed in our mission to protect the civilians." On July 29, 2009, the Department of Justice (DOJ) filed multiple murder charges against 29 policemen, including three generals, in connection with the shootout following the filing of a complaint-affidavit by Lilian de Vera, who lost her husband and seven-year-old daughter in the incident. On January 11, 2010, the Commission on Human Rights recommended the filing of criminal and administrative charges against 26 policemen In March, it was reported that after two witnesses had said De Vera and his daughter were not killed in the shootout, that policemen already had complete control of the area where the two were killed.

=== Binayug torture case ===
Inspector Joselito Binayug, chief of the Asuncion police community precinct in Tondo arrested Darius Evangelista on March 5, 2009, for alleged robbery. A torture video was leaked to the media and shown on television showing a police officer whipping and cursing the suspect and pulling on a rope that was tied to the victim's genitals. The incident allegedly happened inside the Asuncion police precinct in Tondo. Binayug was arrested for violating the Anti-Torture act of 2009. Separate charges were filed for Evangelista being tortured to death.

=== Maguindanao massacre ===
On November 24, 2009, Senior Superintendent Abusana Maguid, the police chief of Maguindanao province, was reported to have been relieved of his duties after witnesses reported seeing three of his officers at the scene of the Maguindanao massacre in which 57 people, including journalists, lawyers, aides, and motorists who were witnesses were killed. On November 25 Maguid and Chief Inspector Sukarno Dikay were reported to have been relieved from post and placed under restrictive custody. On November 26, Department of the Interior and Local Government (DILG) Secretary Ronaldo Puno announced that Maguid, Dikay, and others were suspected of involvement in the massacre. On December 19, Maguid, Dikay, and others were reported to have been recommended for summary dismissal by the PNP high command. On April 16, 2010, the National Police Commission ordered a 90-day suspension against Maguid, Dikay, and 60 other police personnel for their possible involvement in the killings. On July 10, it was reported that Dikay had applied to become state witness, saying that he is confident that his testimony will pin down the masterminds of the killing.

=== Failed hostage rescue operation ===
The Philippine National Police conceded that in the 2010 Manila hostage crisis they made blunders in ending a bus hijacking, as outrage grew over the bloody assault played out on live television that left eight Hong Kong tourists dead. The Hong Kong Economic Journal was reported to have accused the PNP of having "appalling professional standards" and "...[a] lack of strategic planning".

=== "Wheel of Torture" secret detention facility ===
The Philippine Commission on Human Rights filed charges against ten police officers after it was discovered that they routinely tortured detainees inside a secret detention facility in Biñan, Laguna. It was alleged that some "were tortured for the police officers’ amusement" when they're intoxicated. The facility is notorious for utilizing a roulette called the "Wheel of Torture", a play on the Wheel of Fortune, where various torture methods were printed. The wheel is rotated and wherever the pin stops, the indicated torture method is perpetrated on the detainee.

The torture methods included a 20-second Manny Pacman punch, named after the famous boxer Manny Pacquiao, where the detainee is beaten for 20 seconds; "Paniki" which means being hung like a bat; "Tusok ulo ka" which means being pierced through the head; "Zombies" which means being electrocuted; and other degrading tasks like "duck walk" and "Ferris wheel".

=== Kidnapping and killing of Jee Ick-Joo ===
Sometime in January 2017, a Korean was killed inside Camp Crame. The Philippine National Police Anti-Kidnapping Group (PNP-AKG) charged former NBI officials Roel Boliv, Ricardo Diaz, and Jose Yap in relation to the case.

=== 2013 Pampanga drug recycling scandal ===
In 2013, an anti-illegal drug unit led by Police Chief Inspector (now Police Major) Rodney Baloyo launched an operation against a certain Chinese national inside a subdivision in Mexico, Pampanga. However, an alleged recycling of Methamphetamine Hydrocloride locally known as "shabu" worth 648 million Philippine Pesos confiscated dubbed as "Agaw-Bato" by the media and setting drug lord Johnson Lee free were discovered by then Criminal Investigation and Detection Group (CIDG) Chief (now Baguio Mayor) Benjamin Magalong resulting in the dismissal of 13 police officers dubbed as "Ninja Cops" (including Baloyo) involved in the said operation. In 2019, Magalong revealed that PNP Chief Oscar Albayalde who was the Pampanga provincial director when the incident happened, asked not to implement the dismissal of the cops involved in the recycling of drugs and often profited along with the cops involved. The revelations caused Magalong receiving death threats and the resignation of Albayalde on October 14, 2019.

=== Uniter Association ===
In 2019, German news outlets reported that the Philippine National Police received training from Uniter Association (German: Verein Uniter), a non-government organization suspected to be a neo-Nazi paramilitary due to its alleged affiliation with a far-right network called "Hannibal". Kontraste, a news magazine of Germany's public broadcasting network ARD reported that Uniter members held a training seminar at the Seda Hotel with high-ranking officers of the PNP, and other government officials, including E.R. Ejercito who posted photos of the seminar on his Facebook page two days after he was convicted for graft. Uniter denied claims of training Filipino police forces in an attempt to establish right-wing extremist networks overseas, but insisted that they were there for "humanitarian" support for the PNP, which they claimed it as "unfortunate" timing given the ongoing war on drugs. Despite being reported across Germany amidst a neo-Nazi scandal that hit the Bundeswehr (which revolves around an alleged terror plot called "Day X"), it was not reported by Philippine media. The PNP refused to comment on its involvement with Uniter.

=== Mañanita during the COVID-19 pandemic ===
The holding of a mañanita for NCRPO's chief (later PNP Chief) Debold Sinas amidst the COVID-19 pandemic in Metro Manila was criticized for breaching quarantine regulations. A mañanita is a customary celebration in the PNP where senior officers are greeted by their personnel early in the morning of their birthdays. The national police has filed charges against Sinas over the event for violation of existing regulations on social distancing and mass gatherings. However, Sinas was still able to keep his post due to the "emergency situation" posed by the pandemic, as self-proclaimed by him.

=== 2020 Tarlac shooting ===
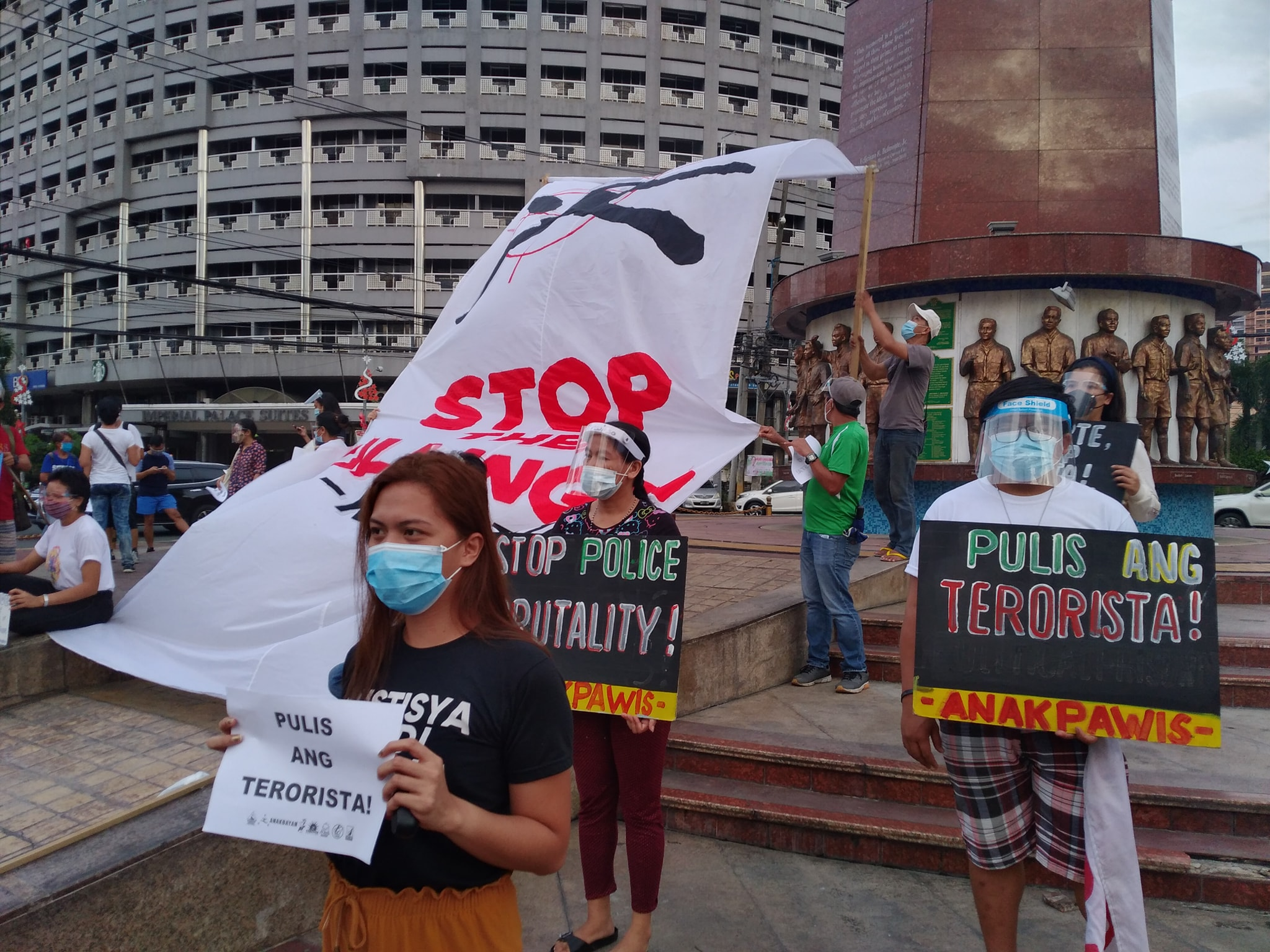
Indignation rally in response to Tarlac shooting incident, December 21, 2020, Boy Scout Circle, Quezon City.

Police Senior Master Sergeant Jonel Nuezca shot to death his two unarmed neighbors, Sonya Gregorio and her son Frank, in Paniqui, Tarlac, on December 20, 2020, at 5:10 p.m. (PST). The incident was reported to the police 20 minutes later and, at 6:19 p.m., Nuezca surrendered at a police station in Pangasinan.

The incident started when Nuezca went to investigate the Gregorios who were shooting a boga–an improvised bamboo cannon used as a noisemaker every December. Nuezca tried to arrest Frank, who appeared to be drunk. This led to a heated argument with Sonya, which culminated in Nuezca killing the two by shooting them at close range. According to Police Colonel Renante Cabico, director of the Tarlac Provincial Police Office, Nuezca was "off duty" at the time of the incident. The police called the incident an "isolated case."

The incident was captured on video and spread online. Several netizens and celebrities condemned the killings on social media with the hashtags #StopTheKillingsPH, #EndPoliceBrutality, #PulisAngTerorista, and #JusticeForSonyaGregorio dominating on Twitter in the Philippines, as well as in Singapore and Dubai. Some critics also pointed at the government over the acts of impunity and human rights abuses in recent years.

An indignation rally was done by numerous groups on December 21, 2020, at the Boy Scout Circle, Quezon City.

The disgraced former PNP officer Jonel Nuezca was found guilty of murder in August 2021 and sentenced to "reclusion perpetua", which is 40 years imprisonment with parole possible after 30 years. He was also ordered to pay PHP476,000 (US$9,377) to the heirs of the victims.

=== Shootout with PDEA Agents (2021) ===
On February 24, 2021, personnel of the Philippine National Police (PNP) and the Philippine Drug Enforcement Agency (PDEA) was involved in a friendly fire incident. Personnel from both sides engaged in a gunfight with both sides saying they were conducting an anti-drug operation. The shootout resulted in 2 deaths and 1 injured on the side of the PNP and 2 deaths and 3 injured on the PDEA side.

=== Quezon City shooting (2021) ===
On May 31, 2021, a police officer Police Master Sergeant Hensie Zinampan, who appeared to be drunk, shot a 52-year-old woman named Lilybeth Valdez dead in close range outside the store in Fairview, Quezon City, at around 9:30 p.m., following a heated argument between the two. The incident was caught on video. PNP Chief Guillermo Eleazar confronted Zinampan for his crime. The police filed administrative and criminal charges against the police officer. The incident sparked outrage on social media, trending the hashtag #PulisAngTerorista on June 1, 2021, with netizens rejecting claims that the incident was an "isolated case." The incident was likened to the 2020 Tarlac shooting.

== See also ==
- Law Enforcement in Philippines
- Department of Interior and Local Government
- Bureau of Jail Management and Penology
- Bureau of Fire Protection
- Tanod
