= Internal Affairs Service of Philippine National Police =

Internal Affairs Service
Agency overview
- Jurisdiction: Government of the Philippines
- Headquarters: Camp Crame
- Motto: Championing Police Service Integrity
- Employees: 700+
- Agency executives: NUP Atty. Brigido J. Dulay, Inspector General; PBGen. Segundo C. Lagundi Jr., Deputy Inspector General; PCol. Ruel A. Ferrer (OIC), Chief, Inspection and Audit Division
- Parent department: National Police Commission
- Parent agency: Philippine National Police
- Child agency: PNP Integrity Development Unit
- Key document: Republic Act 8551
- Website: www.ias.pnp.gov.ph

The Internal Affairs Service (IAS) of the Philippine National Police (PNP) which investigates infractions allegedly committed by the members of the PNP. It was created pursuant to Republic Act (RA) 8551 otherwise known as "The PNP Reform and Reorganization Act of 1998", and is tasked to instill police discipline, enhance the delivery of police service and dispense justice.

== Proposed independence ==
As conceived in RA 8551, the IAS is part of the PNP - an institutional setup which has led to proposals for the IAS to be made an independent unit, since all of the unit's actions are subject to review by, and are sometimes reversed by PNP commanders. The institutional arrangement also made it difficult for the investigate any allegations which may be directed towards top PNP commanders, who are the ones who approve the investigations. As a result, in 2019, it was proposed that the agency be removed from the administration of the PNP and made an attached agency of the Philippines' Department of the Interior and Local Government.

== Notable personalities ==
- Atty. Alfegar M. Triambulo, second Inspector General of IAS, who was at the forefront of pushing for the independence of IAS from the PNP
- Atty. Alexis Canonizado, former Commissioner of the National Police Commission who later served as the first and founding Inspector General of IAS
- Atty. Lyndon Rom David, former Executive Staff Chief, Chief Governance and Innovation Officer, and Planning and Research Chief ad interim of IAS, responsible for its reforms from 2018 to 2024

== See also ==
- Security sector governance and reform in the Philippines
