= Philippine National Police Maritime Group =

Maritime Police unit of the Philippine National Police

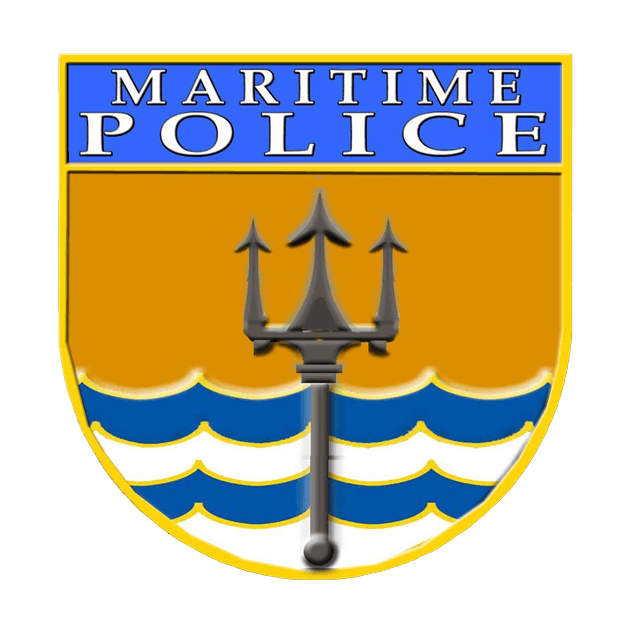
- Common name: PNP Maritime Group
- Abbreviation: PNP-MG
- Motto: "By Land and Sea, We Overcome "

Agency overview
- Formed: January 16, 1991; 35 years ago
- Preceding agencies: Constabulary Off-Shore Anti-Crime Battalion (COSAC); PNP Maritime Police Command (PNP-MARICOM); Constabulary Boat Service

Jurisdictional structure
- Operations jurisdiction: Philippines

Operational structure
- Headquarters: Headquarters Maritime Group, Camp Crame, Quezon City, Philippines
- Agency executives: PBGen Jonathan A. Cabal, Director; PCol Gonzalo C. Villamor Jr., Deputy Director for Administration; PCol Rhoderick B. Campo, Deputy Director for Operations; PCol Pedro P. Martirez, Jr, Acting Chief of Staff
- Parent agency: Philippine National Police

Notables
- Significant operations: Maritime Law Enforcement, Anti-Criminality, Public Safety and Internal Security; Battle of Marawi

Website
- PNP–Maritime Group

The Philippine National Police Maritime Group (PNP-MG) is a National Operational Support Unit (NOSU) of the Philippine National Police mandated to perform all police functions, ensure public safety and internal security over Philippine territorial waters, rivers and coastal areas to include ports and harbors and sustain the protection of the maritime environment. The unit was created along with the PNP by virtue of Republic Act RA 6975 otherwise known as Department of the Interior and Local Government Act of 1990 (Section 35.b.1):

== History ==
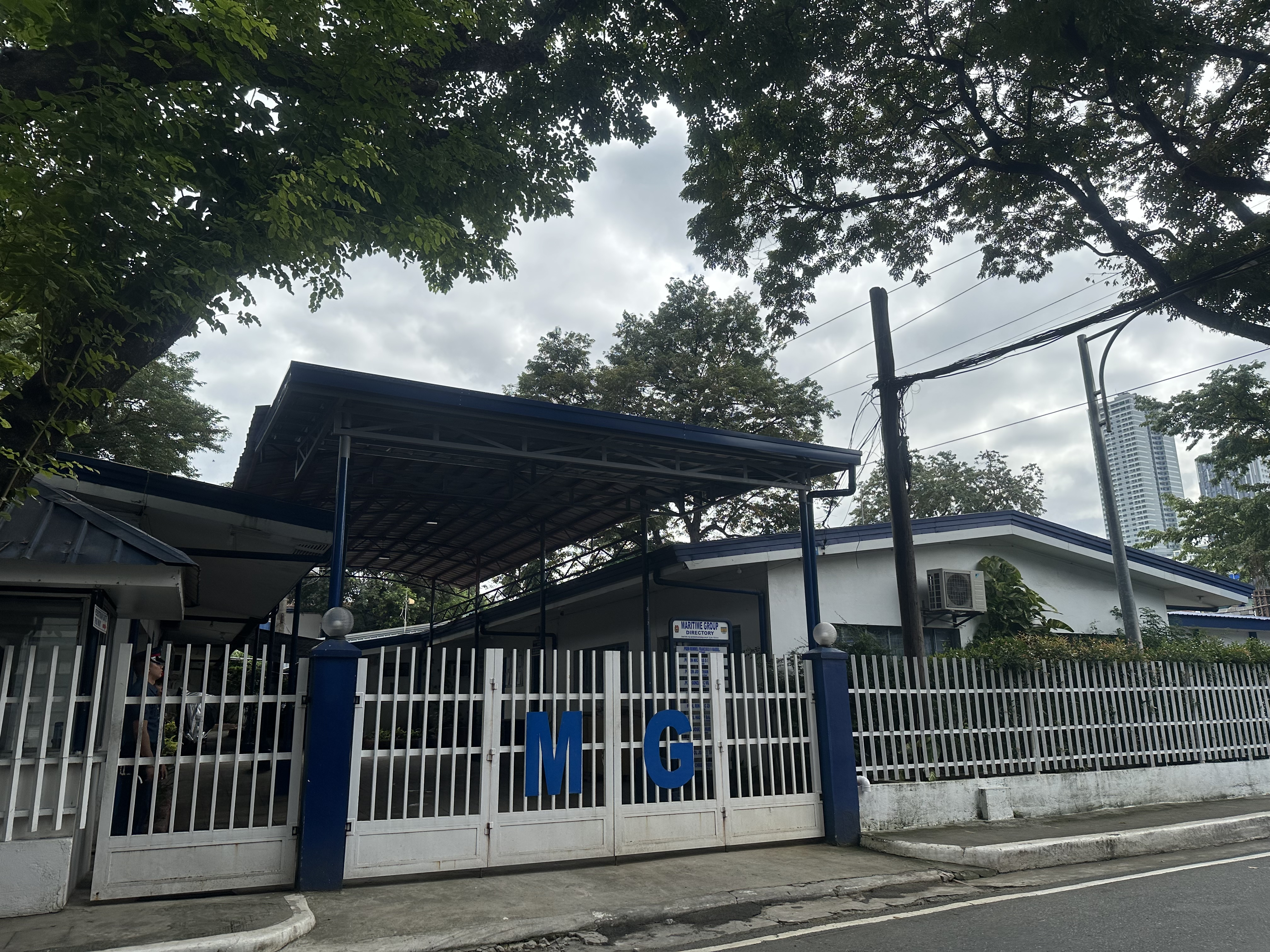
Headquarters Maritime Group, Camp BGen Rafael T Crame, Quezon City

The concept of a maritime police unit emanated during the days of Philippine Constabulary that led to the creation of a seaborne battalion called Constabulary Off-Shore Anti-Crime Battalion (COSAC) on February 1, 1971. The COSAC was tasked to suppress all criminal activities that affects the environment. After the establishment of the Philippine National Police through Republic Act 6975, the Maritime Police Command (MARICOM) was created on January 16, 1991, by virtue of NHQ Philippine National Police General Orders No. 58 as one of the National Support Units of the PNP. The original members of the Maritime Command are personnel of Philippine Constabulary, Philippine Navy, Integrated National Police and Philippine Coast Guard. On September 12, 1996, the National Police Commission (Philippines) issued the Resolution No.96-058, changing the name of the Maritime Police Command (MARICOM) to Maritime Group (MG).

== Mission ==
To perform all police functions and ensure public safety and internal security over Philippine territorial waters and rivers including ports of entry and exit; and sustain the protection of the maritime environment.

Specifically, PNP-MG has the following functions:

- To train, equip, mobilize, organize and manage resources for effective maritime law enforcement and internal security operations;
- To enforce all laws, rules, regulations and ordinances relative to the protection of lives, properties and environment;
- To arrest, investigate and assist in the prosecution of terrorists, smuggling, drug traffickers and other criminal element;
- To conduct search and rescue operations.

== Legal basis ==
As an integral part of the PNP, Maritime Group shares PNP's mandates, albeit on a more specific territorial jurisdiction. While the PNP is mandated to perform all police functions all over the Philippines’ national territory, including but not limited to the land and water territories, Maritime Group's mandate generally applies only in the Philippine territorial waters and rivers including ports of entry and exit. These mandate and jurisdiction were anchored on the following legal bases:

=== 1987 Philippine Constitution ===
The 1987 Philippine Constitution mandated the creation of one national police force that is civilian in character. Today, that national police force came out to become the Philippine National Police (PNP). The national scope of the PNP draws its definition from the Article I of this Constitution, stating that:

″The National Territory comprises the Philippine archipelago, with all the islands and waters embraced therein, and all other territories over which the Philippines has sovereignty or jurisdiction, consisting of its terrestrial, fluvial and aerial domains, including its territorial sea, the seabed, the subsoil, the insular shelves, and other submarine areas.″

It shows that as the national scope of the PNP covers the national territory, the jurisdiction where its police functions would apply covers not only the land but also on aerial and sea territories of the country. Incidentally, Maritime Group is the arm of the PNP having jurisdiction in the sea territory of the country.

=== Republic Act No. 6975 and its IRR ===
The passing into law of RA 6975 on December 13, 1990, merged and reorganized the PC/INP. This resulted in the dissolution of the Philippine Constabulary and the creation of the Philippine National Police. The Maritime Group was created under the same law as one of the PNP's National Operational Support Units.

==== Creation of a Maritime Police Unit ====
Section 35.b (1) of RA 6975 and its IRR created the "Maritime Police Unit headed by a Director with the rank of Chief Superintendent (that) shall perform all police functions over Philippine territorial waters and rivers including ports of entry and exit". This Maritime Police Unit evolved to become the Maritime Group as it exists now. The scope of PNP covers the national territory, not only on the terrestrial but includes the maritime domain. As the sole national police of the country, the PNP has absorbed, assumed and taken-over the police function of the Coast Guard under this law.

==== Absorption, Assumption and Take-over by PNP of the Police Function of Coast Guard ====
Section 24 of RA 6975 provided the various police function of PNP and the additional functions absorbed from different agencies, in an effort to comply with the constitutional requirement that there shall be one national police force. This section specified the Powers and Functions of the PNP. It also requires that “the PNP shall absorb… the police functions of the Coast Guard.”

Section 86 of the law reiterated this as it provides the Assumption by the PNP of Police Functions. This provision mandates that “the police functions of the Coast Guard shall be taken over by the PNP.” Effectively, these provisions of the law dissolved the police functions of these agencies, Coast Guard included. To date this day, no law repealed these provisions.

Specifically, the absorption and take-over of police functions are viewed as a move to comply with the constitutional mandate that there shall only be one police force in the country. Generally, it is understood that the police function of the Coast Guard that was absorbed and taken-over by the PNP, has been vested upon and assumed by the Maritime Group as it performs these functions to this day.

== Organization ==
The unit is currently headed by Police Brigadier General Jonathan A. Cabal as D,MG (Director, Maritime Group). The Command Group is composed of Police Colonel Gonzalo C. Villamor Jr. - Deputy Director for Administration, Police Colonel Rhoderick B. Campo - Deputy Director for Operations, and Police Colonel Pedro P. Martirez, Jr. - Acting Chief of Staff.

Today, the PNP Maritime Group is organized into 17 Regional Maritime Units (RMUs) and four (4) Special Operations Units (SOUs).

=== Regional Maritime Unit ===
The PNP Maritime Group consists of 16 Regional Maritime Units and 5 Special Operations Units located in coastal areas across the country. It includes 56 Maritime Police Stations, 81 Maritime Law Enforcement Teams, and 15 Special Boat Crews.

“The Regional Maritime Units (RMUs) are the operational arms of the PNP Maritime Group, ensuring the enforcement of maritime laws across the country’s waters. Each RMU operates within designated regions, providing coverage for critical coastal areas and key waterways.

=== Special Operations Unit ===
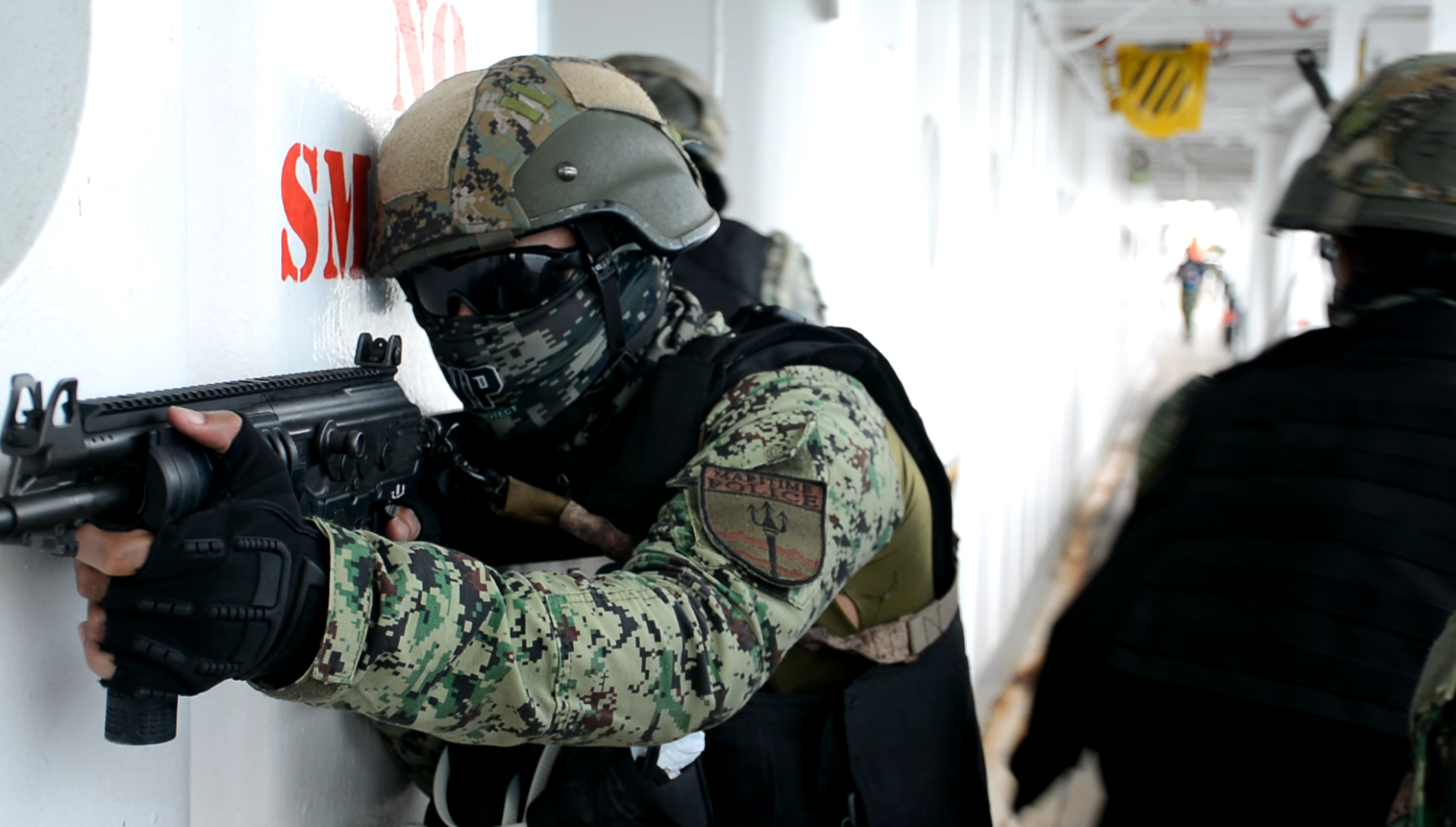
PNP-MG personnel conducting Close Quarter Combat on a water vessel during a training scenario.

In response to the increasing number of criminal activities committed at sea, the National Police Commission (Philippines) approved the activation of Five (5) Special Operations Units (SOUs) under the direct operational and administrative control of PNP Maritime Group. These units are envisioned to protect the territorial waters of the Philippines by providing rapid and highly mobile seaborne law enforcement response.

The operational jurisdiction of these SOUs are as follows:

- 1st SOU-MG - Sitio Sukiat Brgy Nalil Bongao, Tawi-Tawi;
- 2nd SOU-MG - Honda Bay, Brgy. Sta. Lourdes, Puerto Princesa City, Palawan;
- 3rd SOU-MG - E.M Factor Road, Brgy. Don Galo, Parañaque City;
- 4th SOU-MG - Brgy Po-ok Hinoba-an, Negros Occidental
- 5th SOU-MG - Sarangani PPO, Brgy Kawas, Alabel, Sarangani, Province.

== Current rank structure and classification (2019–present) ==
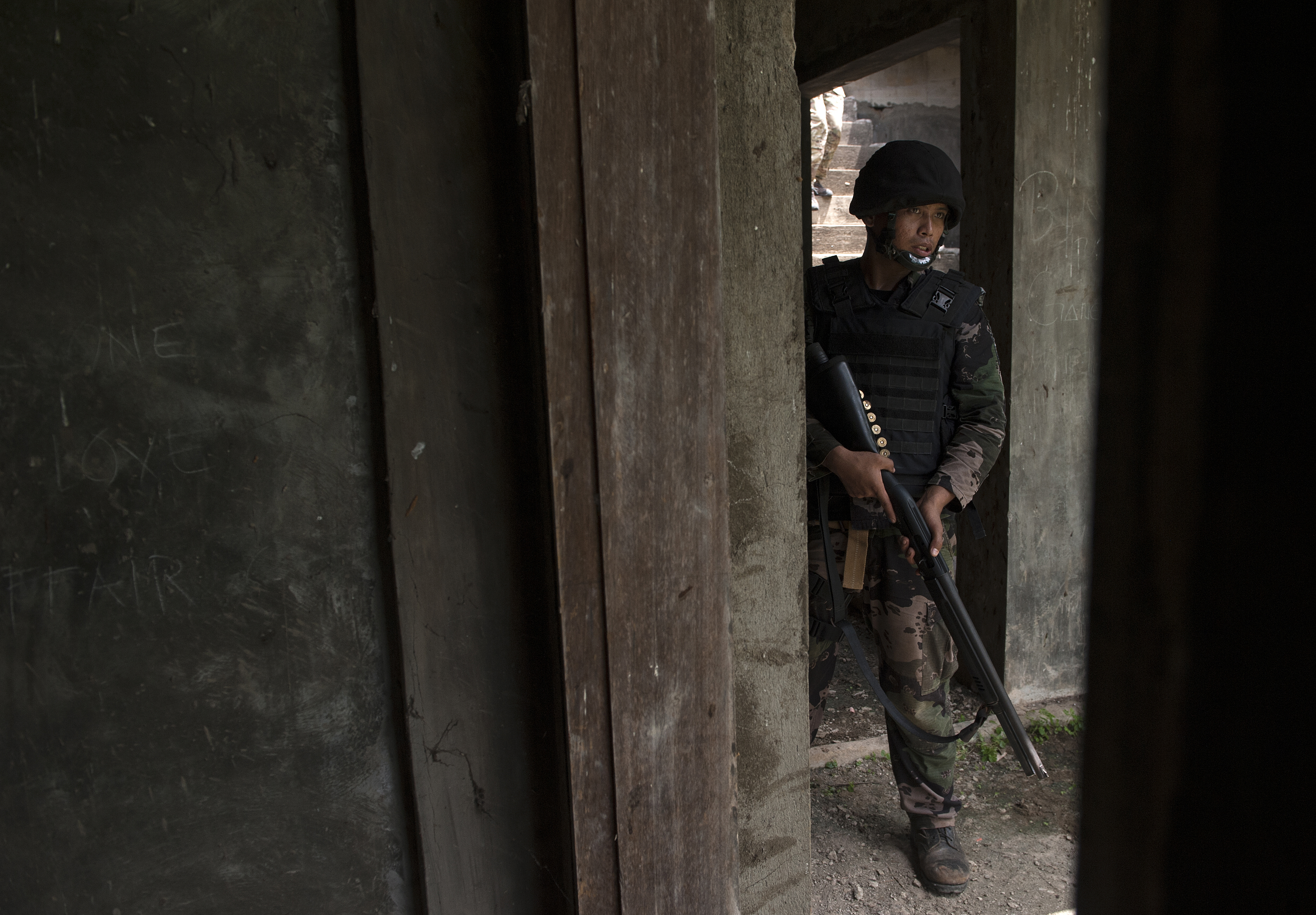
PNP Maritime Group member waits to clear rooms of an abandoned hotel

As of February 8, 2019, a new rank structure and classification for the Philippine National Police was adopted, eliminating the confusion with the old ranks. The enabling law for the ranking is Republic Act 11200 which was signed by President Rodrigo Duterte, amending the section of the Department of the Interior and Local Government Act of 1990 that refers to the ranking classification of the Philippine National Police.

However, the usage of this classification internally by the PNP was put on hold in March 2019 during the creation of rules and regulations (IRR) of the rank classification, which determined how each rank would be officially abbreviated. The new rank abbreviations and the IRR of the new rank system officially took effect on March 25, 2019.

=== Full set of ranks ===
Per the (2019) rank system, the Philippine National Police has no rank holders of Second Lieutenant, Technical Sergeant, Sergeant and Patrolman First Class.

Insignia	Rank
	Police Brigadier General (PBGEN)
	Police Colonel (PCOL)
	Police Lieutenant Colonel (PLTCOL)
	Police Major (PMAJ)
	Police Captain (PCPT)
	Police Lieutenant (PLT)
	Police Executive Master Sergeant (PEMS)
	Police Chief Master Sergeant (PCMS)
	Police Senior Master Sergeant (PSMS)
	Police Master Sergeant (PMSg)
	Police Staff Sergeant (PSSg)
	Police Corporal (PCpl)
	Patrolman / Patrolwoman (Pat)

Insignia	Former rank system (1991-2019)
	Police Chief Superintendent (PCSUPT)
	Police Senior Superintendent (PSSUPT)
	Police Superintendent (PSUPT)
	Police Chief Inspector (PCINSP)
	Police Senior Inspector (PSINSP)
	Police Inspector (PINSP)
	Senior Police Officer IV (SPO4)
	Senior Police Officer III (SPO3)
	Senior Police Officer II (SPO2)
	Senior Police Officer I (SPO1)
	Police Officer III (PO3)
	Police Officer II (PO2)
	Police Officer I (PO1)

== Operational accomplishments ==
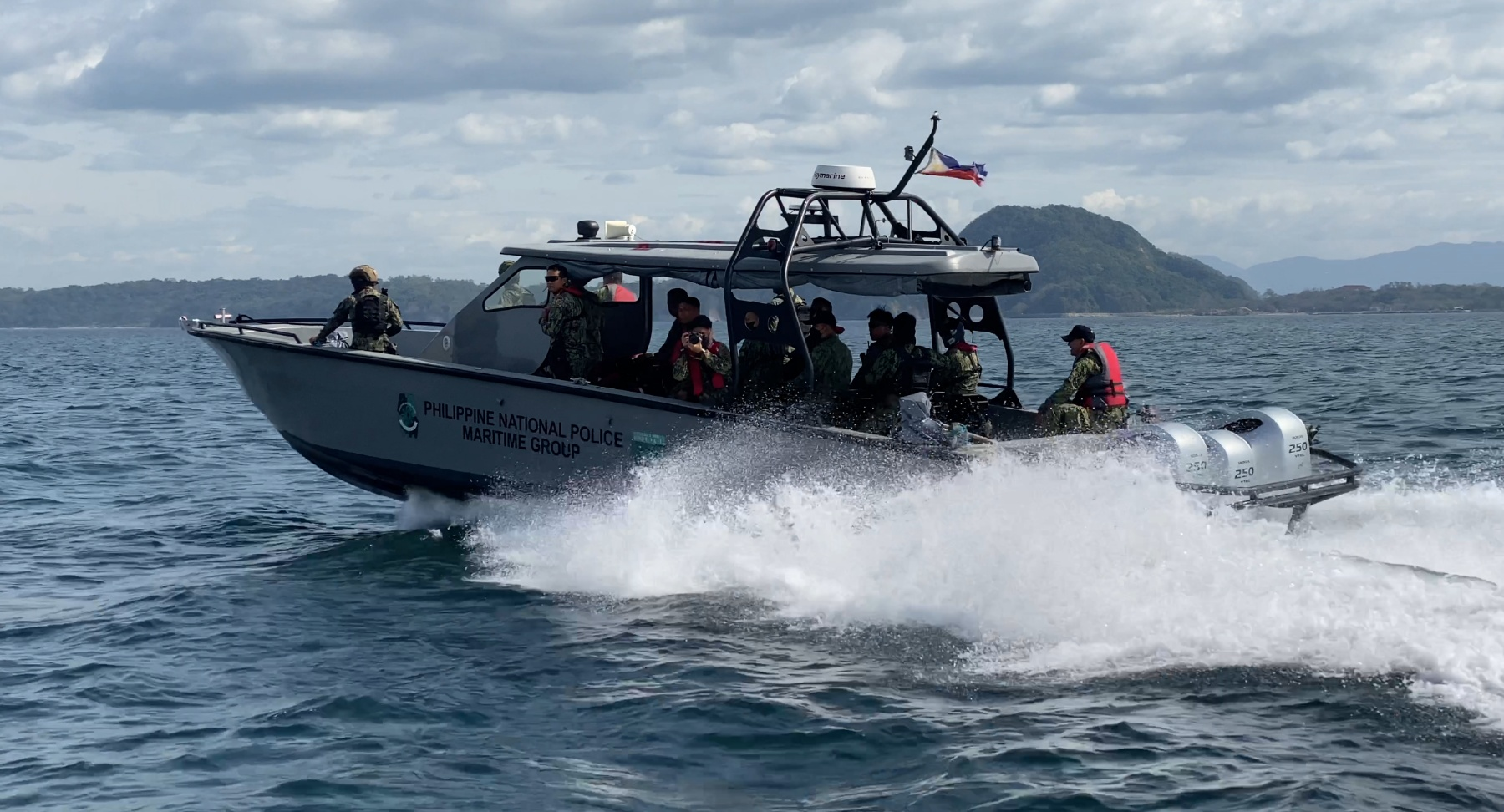
PNP Maritime Group personnel on board a High Speed Tactical Watercraft during a seaborne patrol operation.

Significant Accomplishments/ Activities

(Period Covered: January to November 13, 2024)

For period under review, a total of 19,724 operations against Illegal Fishing were conducted which resulted in the arrest of 4,237 violators and confiscation of more or less PhP10,194,384.00 estimated value of fish catch and filing of 847 cases, 867 cases referred to BFAR, 20 abandoned and 17,940 cases referred to LGUs for violation of local fishery ordinances. Meanwhile, as a result, concerned LGUs and BFAR have collected an administrative fine with a total amount of PhP92,440,732.00. This Group seized 105,231.722 board feet of assorted lumbers with an estimated value of PhP7,812,783.47. In the campaign against illegal possession of chainsaw, this Group has conducted 95 operations that resulted in the arrest of 84 violators and confiscation of 90 units of chainsaw with an estimated value of PhP2,211,850.00.

Likewise, this Group has also conducted 1,324 operations that resulted in the arrest of 382 violators, filing of 336 cases and seizure of various endangered species for violation of RA No. 9147 (Wildlife Resources Conservation and Protection Act). In connection with the campaign against loose firearms or violation of RA 10591, this Group has conducted 76 Lead operations and 214 joint operations with other Law Enforcement Agencies that resulted in the arrest of 189 person and confiscation of 206 assorted short firearms and 52 long weapon. In the campaign against Illegal Drugs, this Group has conducted Six lead operations and 464 joint operations with other Law Enforcement Agencies that resulted in the arrest of 520 individuals and seizures of 143,951.129 grams of suspected “shabu”, 94,516.6 grams of suspected Marijuana with standard drug price amounting to PhP1,250,628,825.06.

Likewise, appropriate criminal charges were filed in various courts against the arrested suspects. In the campaign against smuggling, RA 10863 (Customs Modernization and Tariff Act), this Group has conducted 137 operations that resulted in the seizures of 32,135 reams, 3,964 boxes, 3,150,398 liters of petroleum product and 2,000 sacks of onions with an estimated value amounting to PhP181,216,810.00. All confiscated items were subsequently turned over to the Bureau of Customs.

In the intensified campaign against Wanted Persons, this Group has conducted 809 unit-led operations and 3,057 joint operations with other Law Enforcement Agencies that resulted in the arrest of 3,975 wanted persons.

=== SALBABIDA Project ===
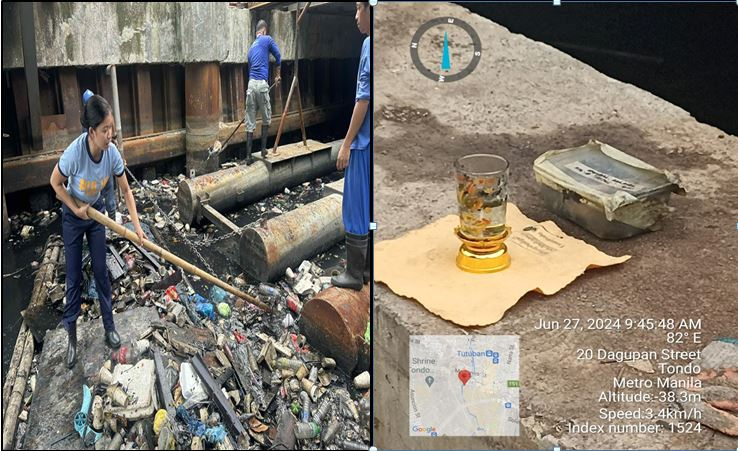
On June 27, 2024 at 9:00 AM, during a clean-up operation held at Estero Dela Reina, corner of P. Herrera Street, Barangay 8, Zone 1, District 1, Tondo, Manila, a deceased fetus was found in a small, labeled container abandoned among the garbage.

The SALBABIDA Project is the flagship initiative of the Maritime Group, focusing on disaster preparedness, environmental conservation, and community engagement in coastal areas.

The project has identified 3,684 disaster-prone coastal barangays and conducted 486 Search and Rescue (SAR) equipment inventories to maintain operational readiness. It delivered 94 SAR training sessions to personnel and organized 180 community disaster preparedness training sessions, empowering residents with emergency skills.

To safeguard coastal and urban waterways, the project organized 466 beach clean-ups and facilitated 669 seminars and webinars on topics like drug prevention and environmental conservation. Through 633 wellness and environmental programs and 132 youth engagement activities, it fostered sustainable practices and community well-being.

Collaborating with 109 stakeholders, including Local Government Units (LGUs) and Non-governmental organizations (NGOs), the project ensures a lasting impact. Some of the success stories during the implementation of this project are the following:

• On June 27, 2024, during a clean-up operation at Estero Dela Reina, Tondo, Manila, the Maritime Group discovered a deceased fetus in a labeled container abandoned in the garbage. This tragic incident highlights the project’s role in addressing both environmental and societal challenges;

• On July 3, 2024, Team 5, led by PMAJ JERWIN I LALAMORO conducted a proactive patrol in Brgy. Pulang Lupa Dos, Las Piñas City which resulted in the voluntary surrender of a live Palawan Hill Mynah, also known as the "Talking Mynah," by Mrs. Princess Milan, 29 years old. This effort was made possible through collaboration with Sub-Station 3, Las Piñas CPS, CENRO and the Barangay Public Safety Office.

The recent Headquarters-led SALBABIDA Project activities from October to November 2024 includes: 15 coordination/visitation to priority rivers and Barangays; 10 river and estero clean-up drives; 3 proactive patrols; and 1 information drive.

Further, this Group has identified 11 priority rivers in NCR (Tonsuya River, Pasig River, Brgy. Pagsisihan Creek; Estero De Tripa Gallina; Pasig River, Brgy. Pulang Lupa, Las Piñas; Pasig River, Brgy. 188, Pasay; Malabon River; Almanza Uno River; Taguig C6 Road; Lakeshore, Taguig C6; and Sta. Ana Creek) for the conduct of clean-up operations.

The project assisted 17 Persons Who Use Drugs (PWUDs), with seven undergoing rehabilitation and 10 successfully completed their programs. Anti-drug campaigns and patrols strengthened safety and resilience in coastal communities.

Maritime Group Rescues Possible Human Trafficking Victims in Tawi-Tawi — On January 31, 2025, at different times, the 1st SOU Maritime Law Enforcement Special Team (MLEST), in collaboration with the Tawi-Tawi Maritime Police Station and other partner agencies, successfully intercepted five individuals aboard M/V Everqueen of Asia. The vessel was sailing from Zamboanga City to Bongao, Tawi-Tawi.

The individuals consisted of four men and one female minor, all of whom lacked the necessary legal documents for travel were attempting to reach Malaysia through an illegal route.

According to the initial investigation, they were offered jobs in Sabah, Malaysia, despite not having the required legal documentation. Their situation showed signs of possible deception and exploitation, consistent with indications of Trafficking in Persons (TIP) as outlined in the Expanded Anti-Trafficking in Persons Act of 2022 (Republic Act No. 11862). Currently, the individuals have been turned over to the Ministry of Social Services and Development (MSSD) in Bongao, where they received appropriate assistance and protection from local authorities.

The Maritime Group continues to encourage the public to remain vigilant and immediately report any suspicious activities related to human trafficking. Collective action is crucial in preventing this crime and ensuring the safety of everyone in our coastal areas.

=== Maritime Group Rescues Possible Human Trafficking Victims in Tawi-Tawi ===
On January 31, 2025, at different times, the 1st SOU Maritime Law Enforcement Special Team (MLEST), in collaboration with the Tawi-Tawi Maritime Police Station and other partner agencies, successfully intercepted five individuals aboard M/V Everqueen of Asia. The vessel was sailing from Zamboanga City to Bongao, Tawi-Tawi.

The individuals consisted of four men and one female minor, all of whom lacked the necessary legal documents for travel were attempting to reach Malaysia through an illegal route.

According to the initial investigation, they were offered jobs in Sabah, Malaysia, despite not having the required legal documentation. Their situation showed signs of possible deception and exploitation, consistent with indications of Trafficking in Persons (TIP) as outlined in the Expanded Anti-Trafficking in Persons Act of 2022 (Republic Act No. 11862). Currently, the individuals have been turned over to the Ministry of Social Services and Development (MSSD) in Bongao, where they received appropriate assistance and protection from local authorities.

The Maritime Group continues to encourage the public to remain vigilant and immediately report any suspicious activities related to human trafficking. Collective action is crucial in preventing this crime and ensuring the safety of everyone in our coastal areas.

=== Maritime Group Leads Humanitarian Operations in Response to Tropical Storm Kristine ===
The Maritime Group mobilized extensive humanitarian assistance across Regions 1, 2, 3, 4A, 5, and 8, with the Bicol Region suffering the most from flash floods and landslides. The efforts included relief distribution, search and rescue (SAR), and retrieval operations, and support for affected personnel.

Over 1,040 individuals were rescued, and 21 bodies retrieved in landslide-stricken areas. Relief goods such as food and water were distributed in partnership with stakeholders, while security was ensured at evacuation centers and during transport. Despite challenges like logistical constraints, communication breakdowns, and responder fatigue, the operations underscored the Maritime Group’s commitment to saving lives and aiding recovery.

Recommendations include improved communication systems, pre-positioned relief supplies, enhanced SAR logistics, and better support for responders to strengthen future disaster responses.

=== Dumaguete MARPSTA Seaborne Patrol Intercepts Motorized Banca, Arrests 3 for Illegal Fishing ===
On May 7, 2024, elements from Dumaguete City MARPSTA, RMU7 conducted Seaborne Patrol Operation along Seawaters of Brgy Nagbo-alao, Basay, Negros Oriental that resulted in the interception of one motorized banca (double hull) 10.44 GT, color white and blue powered by 4DR Mitsubishi Engine with defaced engine no. with estimated value: Php250,000.00 and the arrest of three individuals for Violation of Section 95 (Use of Active Gear) of RA 10654.

=== Cebu MARPSTA Patrol Seizes Motorized Banca, Arrests 3 for Illegal Fishing Using Explosives ===
On August 16, 2024, elements from Cebu City MARPSTA – Northern Cebu MLET, RMU7 conducted Seaborne Patrol Operation along Seawaters of Brgy. Hilotongan Bantayan, Cebu that resulted in the interception of one (1) motorized banca, unmarked, color white, blue and orange powered by Two (2) unit of Engine, one (1) Carera 12HP and one (1) Carera 16HP Gasoline Engine with defaced engine no. with an estimated value of PhP105,000.00 and the arrest of 3 individuals for Violation of Section 92 of RA 10654 (Fishing Through Explosives, Noxious or Poisonous Substance, or Electricity).

=== Palawan Joint Operation Apprehends Suspect for Illegal Wildlife Trading and Transport ===
On March 2, 2024, personnel from 2nd SOU-MG, in coordination with the Palawan Council for Sustainable Development (PCSD) and Taytay Municipal Police Station, conducted a joint operation against illegal wildlife trading in Sitio Manguao, Brgy. Poblacion, Taytay, Palawan. The operation resulted in the apprehension of an individual for violating Section 27, Paragraphs (e) and (i) of RA 9147, the Wildlife Resources Conservation and Protection Act, concerning the illegal trade and transport of wildlife.

=== Seaborne Patrol in Tawi-Tawi Confiscates Smuggled Cigarettes in Coastal Warehouse ===
On July 13, 2024, personnel of 1st TTPMFC received information from a concerned citizen that a motorized boat loaded with undetermined quantity of assorted smuggled cigarettes docked and unloaded the contraband items at a warehouse located in the coastal area of Barangay Lamion, Bongao, Tawi-Tawi. conducted joint seaborne patrol operation onboard PGB 006 to verify the said report. upon arrival thereat, the operating units noticed the aforesaid smuggled cigarettes in a small warehouse which resulted in the confiscation of the subject contraband items for violation of RA 10863 an Act known as “Customs Modernization and Tariff Act.

=== Maritime Group Rescues Elderly and Children from Severe Flooding in Malabon ===
On July 24, 2024, Maritime Group personnel swiftly responded to severe flooding in Brgy. Catmon, Malabon City, where water had risen to breast-deep levels. The team quickly assembled a makeshift banca, allowing them to transport elderly residents and children safely to the evacuation center, ensuring the community’s most vulnerable were brought to safety.

=== Maritime Group Responds to Medical Emergency for Tourist in Puerto Princesa ===
On June 16, 2024, personnel from the Maritime Group responded to an emergency involving a male tourist who became unconscious due to high blood pressure while traveling from Luli Island to Cowrie Island, Honda Bay, Puerto Princesa City. The 2nd SOU-MG team provided immediate medical assistance, performing CPR before transporting him to further care with the support of a registered nurse and family members.

=== Maritime Group's Role in the Battle of Marawi ===
The PNP Maritime Group deployed one of its patrol craft, the Police Fast Boat (PFB)221 with personnel complement from its Regional Maritime Unit (RMU) 12 in General Santos City, MG-Special Operations Unit 1 from Tawi-Tawi, and RMU 10 from Cagayan de Oro City. The PNP MG personnel is part of the combined security forces composed of Philippine Navy and Philippine Coast Guard in securing the vicinity of Lake Lanao in Marawi. Their role in securing the lake is not easy as they were in the receiving end of sniper shots.

For their service in the conflict, Sixteen PNP MG personnel were meritoriously promoted for their service in the Marawi siege.

=== Chinese Fishermen Poaching of more than 500 Sea turtles in Palawan ===
On May 6, 2014, a PNP Maritime Group patrol intercepted a Chinese fishing vessel loaded with about 500 live and dead Sea turtles, of assorted species, off the coast of Western Palawan. Nine (9) Chinese fishermen were arrested and later charged for violations of Fishery and Wildlife laws of the Philippines. A total of 555 Sea turtles were recovered based on the inventory of the PNP Maritime Group. Of these total, 177 were alive and were released immediately back to wild. The maritime police investigators also discovered that 207 sea turtles were slaughtered and stuffed by the Chinese fishermen.

=== Vietnamese Fishermen arrested for poaching ===
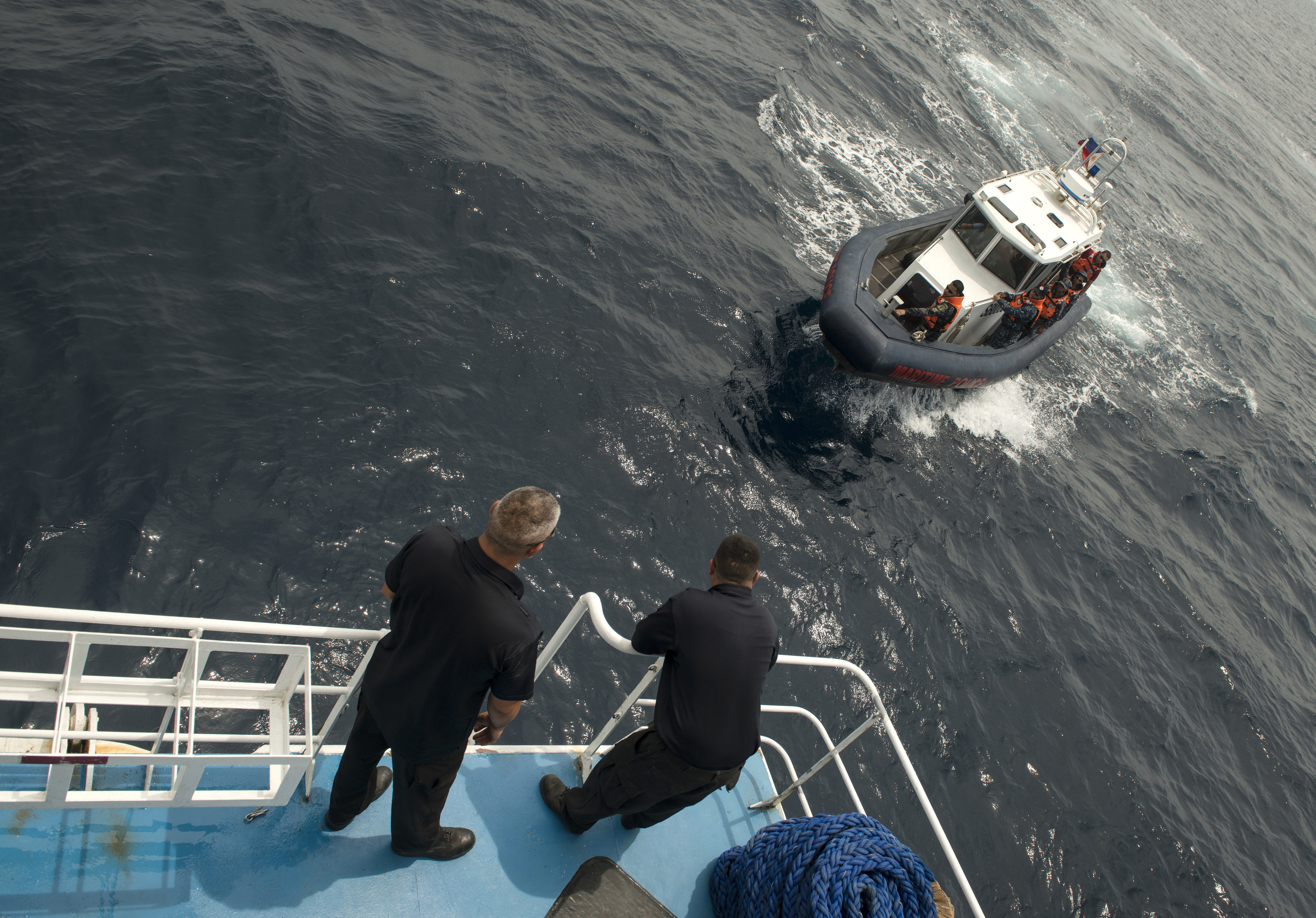
Members of the Philippine National Police (PNP) Maritime Group prepare to board during a boat inspection training scenario as part of the JIATF West exercise Aug. 5, 2014, in Palawan, Philippines.

- On October 21, 2013, 13 Vietnamese fishermen were arrested for poaching and illegal entry. Upon inspection of their cargo hold, Maritime Group personnel discovered an undetermined number of Sea turtles, mostly slaughtered for meat and frozen in the onboard refrigerators. The Vietnamese poachers were detained and later charged in court for violations of Philippine Fisheries Law.
- On March 26, 2014, a Vietnamese vessel marked KH-96365-TS was intercepted by PNP Maritime Group operatives for poaching off the waters of Taytay, Palawan. The maritime police operatives discovered about 50 assorted dead sharks, including great white sharks, bull sharks and hammerhead sharks, all believed to be caught in Philippine waters. They were charged in court for violations of Philippine Fisheries Law.

== See also ==
- Philippine Coast Guard
