= List of University of the Philippines Los Baños people =

The University of the Philippines Los Baños (UPLB) is a state university located in the towns of Los Baños and Bay in the province of Laguna. It traces its roots to the UP College of Agriculture (UPCA), which was founded in 1909 by the American colonial government to promote agricultural education and research in the Philippines. UPLB was formally established in 1972 following the union of UPCA with four other Los Baños and Diliman-based UP units.

The university has played an influential role in Asian agriculture and biotechnology due to its pioneering efforts in plant breeding and bioengineering, particularly in the development of high-yielding and pest-resistant crops. In recognition for its work, it received the Ramon Magsaysay Award for International Understanding in 1977.

While people affiliated with the University of the Philippines Los Baños practice in various disciplines, most of them specialize in agriculture and related fields. These include alumni, (among them 13 National Scientists) faculty and honorary degree recipients. As of 2014, there have been 33 who have graduated summa cum laude, the highest distinction awarded by the university.

== Alumni and faculty ==
=== Alumni ===
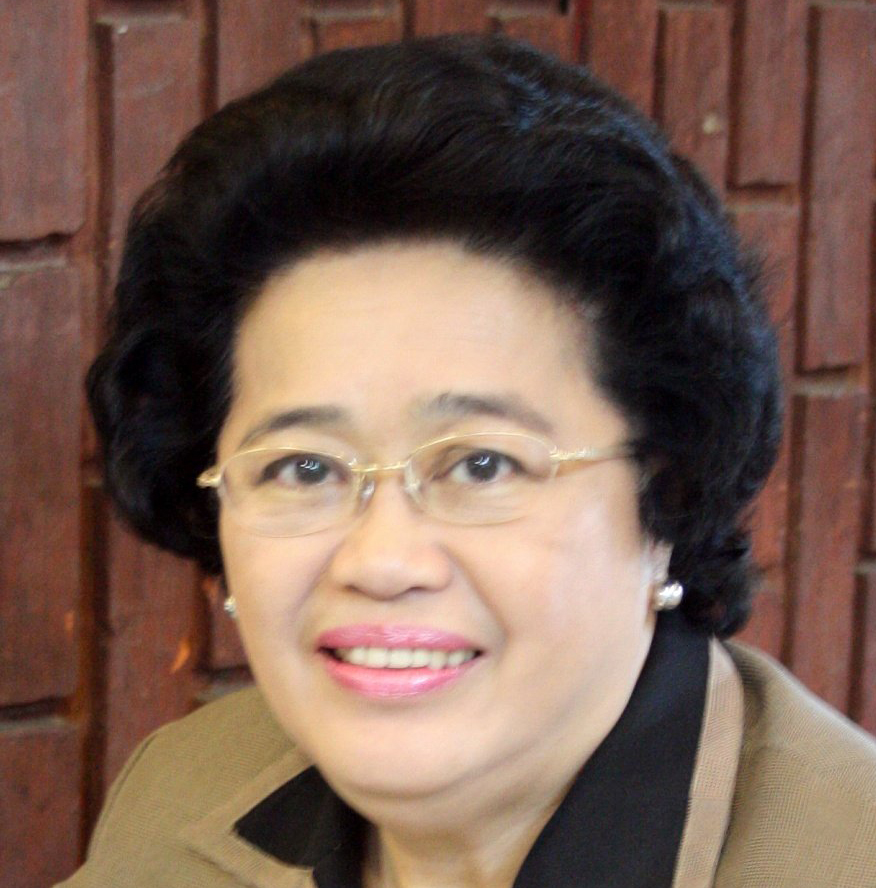
Emerlinda Roman

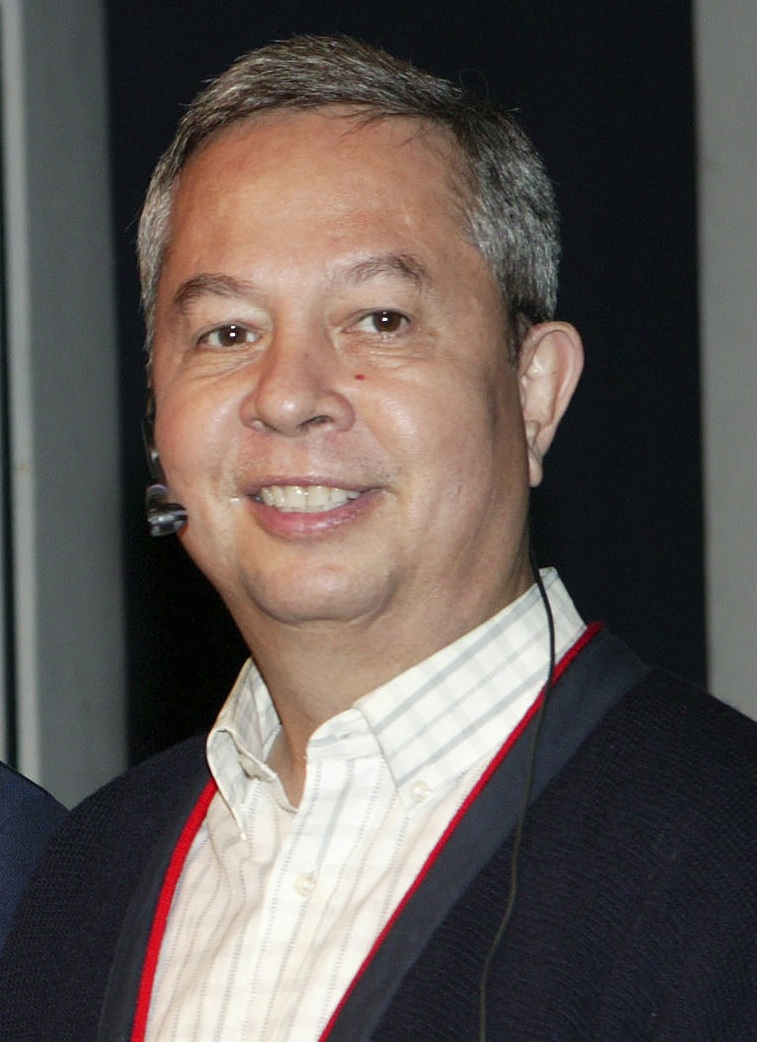
Nicanor Perlas

Name	Relationship	Discipline	Known for	Notes
Nilo Alcala	Undergraduate	Development communication	Musical composer	
Jaime Aristotle Alip	Undergraduate	Agricultural Economics	Founder and Chairman Emeritus of CARD-MRI	
Sol Aragones	Undergraduate	Development communication	Congresswoman, 3rd District of Laguna and former ABS-CBN reporter	
Ariella Arida	Undergraduate	Chemistry	Miss Universe 2013 3rd runner-up and Binibining Pilipinas 2013 winner	
Patrick Azanza	Undergraduate	Sociology	Governor of Catanduanes 2025; President of Catanduanes State University 2021-2025	
Antonio Bautista	Undergraduate	Agriculture	Fighter Pilot, Philippine Air Force	
Proceso Maligalig	Undergraduate	Agriculture	President, Bataan Shipyard and Engineering Company; President Emeritus and Co-Founder, Reform the Armed Forces Movement (RAM)	
Leopoldo Maligalig	Undergraduate	Agriculture	Former Superintendent, Philippine Military Academy; Consultant Lopez Holdings Corporation	
Manuel Bautista	Undergraduate	Economics	Activist martyr and student leader honored at the Bantayog ng mga Bayani, who helped spearhead the establishment of the Textbook Exchange and Rental Center (TERC)	
Abigail Binay	Undergraduate	Human Ecology	Mayor of Makati and former Congresswoman, 2nd District of Makati City	
Teodoro Casiño	Undergraduate	Sociology	Former Member of the House of Representatives of the Philippines	
Cedric Castillo	Graduate	Civil engineering	GMA News reporter and former civil engineer	
Qamar-uz-Zaman Chaudhry	Graduate	Meteorology	Former director-general of Pakistan Meteorological Department	
Chuang Lojaya	Undergraduate	Agriculture	Founder of the Kasetsart University	
John Consulta	Undergraduate	Communication arts	GMA News reporter	
Eduardo Cojuangco, Jr.	Undergraduate	Agriculture	Chairman of San Miguel Corporation	
William Dar	Graduate	Horticulture	Director-general of International Crops Research Institute for the Semi-Arid Tropics	
Lizbeth De Padua	Undergraduate	Biology	Bb. Pilipinas 1976	
Mario Dumaual	Undergraduate	Communication Arts	ABS CBN Reporter and Producer	
Ria Fernandez	Undergraduate	Development Communication	PTV news anchor	
Terence Guillermo	Graduate	Development communication	Multi-awarded Theater Actor, Composer, Director, Educator	
Cielito Habito	Undergraduate	Agricultural economics	Director-general of the National Economic and Development Authority from 1992 to 1998	
Insi Jantharasathit	Undergraduate	Agriculture	Founder of the Kasetsart University	
Jiggy Manicad	Undergraduate	Communication arts	GMA News reporter	
Nicanor Perlas	Undergraduate	Agriculture	2010 Philippine presidential candidate	
Oscar Oida	Undergraduate	Communication arts	GMA News reporter	
Ramon Paje	Undergraduate	Forestry	DENR Secretary	
Maria Valentina Plaza	Undergraduate	Agribusiness management	Member of the House of Representatives of the Philippines	
Ferdinand Recio	Undergraduate	Veterinary Medicine	Wildlife show host	
Emerlinda Roman	Undergraduate	Agriculture	First woman president of the University of the Philippines	
Sabrina	Undergraduate	Communication arts	Bossa nova singer	
Jerrold Tarog	Undergraduate	Agribusiness management	Film director	
Patricia Santo Tomas	Graduate	Master of Science	Chairman of Development Bank of the Philippines	
Thongdi Resanon	Undergraduate	Agriculture	Founder of the Kasetsart University	
Louie Tabing	Undergraduate	Agriculture	Radio broadcaster	
Isidro Ungab	Undergraduate	Agricultural economics	Member of the House of Representatives of the Philippines	
Juan Miguel Zubiri	Undergraduate/Graduate	Agribusiness management, environment and natural resources management	Senator of the Philippines	
Sue Prado	Undergraduate	Communication Arts	Actress	

=== Faculty ===
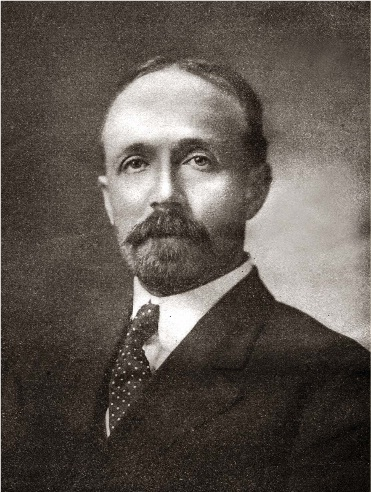
Edwin Copeland

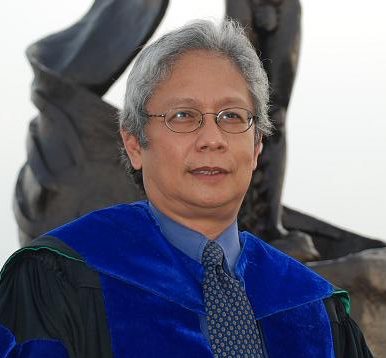
Alexander Flor

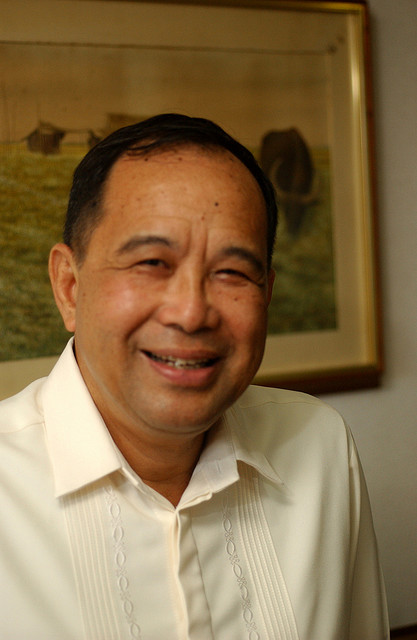
Emil Q. Javier

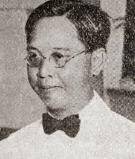
Manuel L. Roxas

Name	Relationship	Discipline	Known for	Notes
Aloysius Baes	Faculty member	Environmental chemistry	Environmental activist honored at the Bantayog ng mga Bayani as a hero who fought against the Marcos dictatorship.	
Clare R. Baltazar	Department head	Systematic entomology	National Scientist of the Philippines	
Rommel Banlaoi	Professor	Political science	Vice president for administrative affairs of National Defense College of the Philippines	
Julian Banzon	Department head	Biophysical chemistry	National Scientist of the Philippines	
Adelina Barrion	Division head	Genetics	Genetic study of spiders	
Gelia T. Castillo	Professor	Rural sociology	National Scientist of the Philippines	
Edwin Copeland	UPCA dean	Botany	One of the first five professors of UPCA	
Pedro Escuro	Professor emeritus	Genetics and plant breeding	National Scientist of the Philippines	
Francisco Fronda	Professor emeritus	Poultry husbandry	National Scientist of the Philippines	
Emil Q. Javier	Chancellor	Plant breeding	UP President from 1993 to 1999	
Bienvenido Juliano	Professor	Organic chemistry	National Scientist of the Philippines	
Ricardo Lantican	UPCA dean	Genetics and plant breeding	National Scientist of the Philippines	
Cristina Padolina	Professor	Chemistry	President of Centro Escolar University since 2006	
Nora C. Quebral	Professor emeritus	Development communication	Senior fellow at Communication for Sustainable Social Change	
Eduardo Quisumbing	Professor emeritus	Plant taxonomy	National Scientist of the Philippines	
Dolores Ramirez	Professor	Biochemical genetics	National Scientist of the Philippines	
Manuel L. Roxas	Professor emeritus	Sugar technology	First Filipino doctor of philosophy	
Patricia Santo Tomas	Professor	Development communication	Former chairperson of Development Bank of the Philippines	
Francisco Santos	UPCA dean	Agricultural chemistry	National Scientist of the Philippines	
Teodulo Topacio	College of Veterinary Medicine dean	Veterinary medicine	National Scientist of the Philippines	
Dioscoro L. Umali	UPCA dean	Genetics and plant breeding	National Scientist of the Philippines	
Jose R. Velasco	Professor emeritus	Plant physiology	National Scientist of the Philippines	

== Honorary degree recipients ==
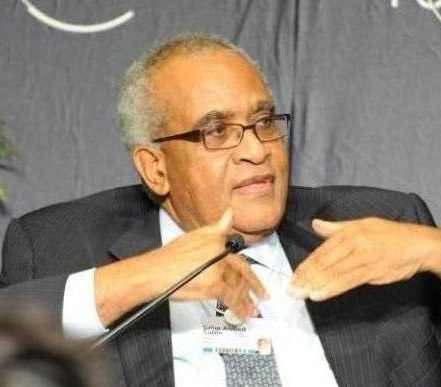
Salim Ahmed Salim

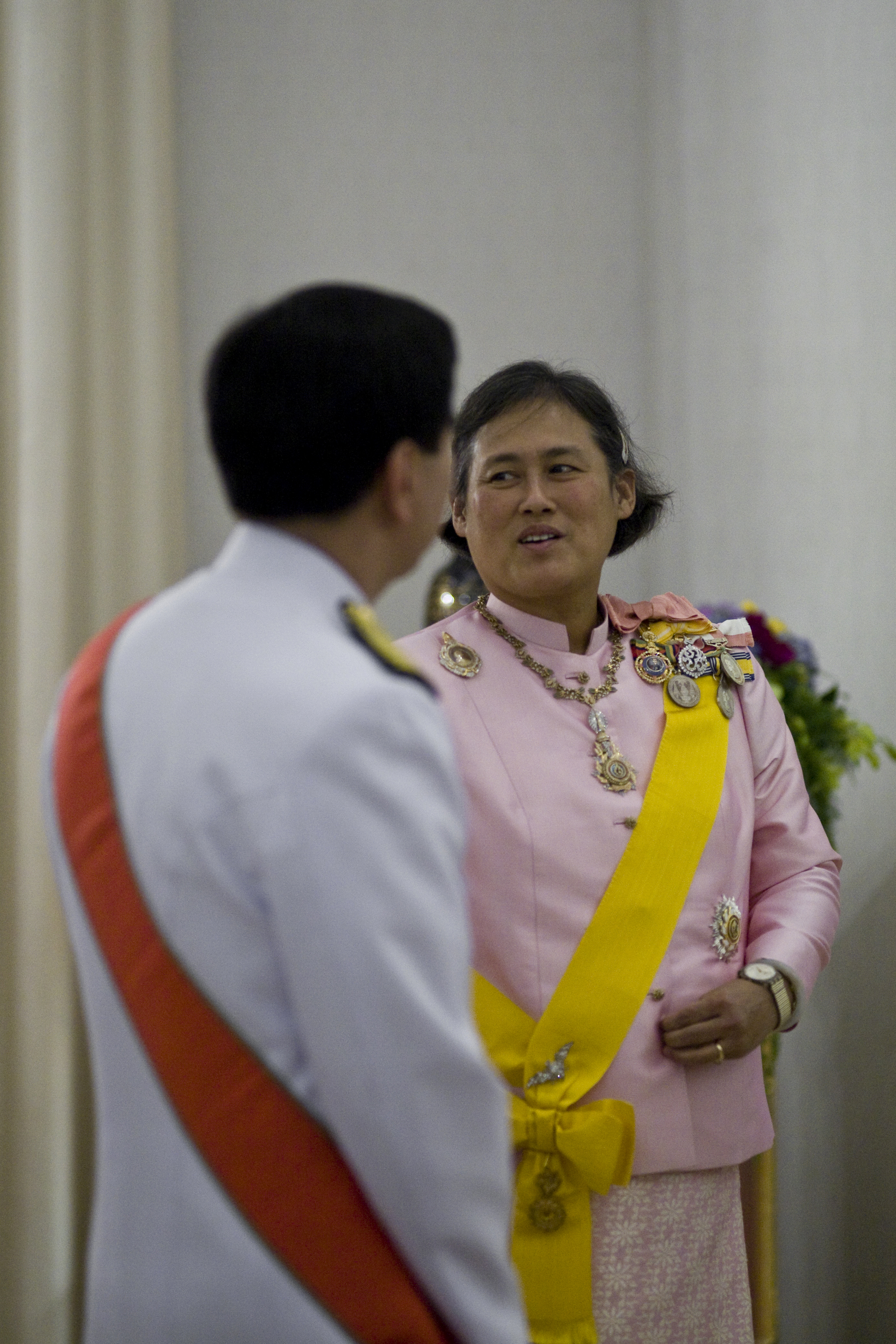
Sirindhorn (right)

LLD – Doctor of Laws

Name	Degree	Year	Known for	Notes
Salim Ahmed Salim	LLD	1980	Former Prime Minister of Tanzania	
Sirindhorn	LLD	2009	Princess of Thailand	
