= 1995 Kuratong Baleleng killings =

1995 killings of a Philippine crime syndicate

- Location: Commonwealth Avenue, Quezon City, Philippines
- Date: May 18, 1995 approximately 5 a.m. (UTC +8)
- Attack type: Shooting
- Weapon: Small arms
- Deaths: 11
- Perpetrator: Presidential Anti-Crime Commission (PACC)
- Charges: Panfilo Lacson and PACC: Multiple counts of Murder
- Verdict: Panfilo Lacson and PACC: Not guilty

On May 18, 1995, the Kuratong Baleleng crime syndicate clashed with the members of the Philippine Presidential Anti-Crime Commission (PACC), resulting in the deaths of several syndicate members.

== The killings ==
The Kuratong Baleleng is a crime syndicate known for major bank robberies in the Metro Manila. It was one of the top monitored syndicates of the Anti-Bank Robbery Task Force.

On May 18, 1995, the syndicate was spotted by the task force in a van and were pursued. A shootout occurred while the syndicate passed a road in Quezon City in the early morning until they reached Commonwealth Avenue, where they clashed with the police officers. In a press conference, Police Director General Recaredo Sarmiento said that the police officers had only intercepted the syndicate when they were routing to their hideout; the policemen involved did not sustain any injuries.

After the clash, the police recovered four ArmaLite rifles, 210 ammunition rounds, and P380,000 cash. Later, Wilson Soronda, the leader of the syndicate, as well as his money handler (his sister Gemma Siplon), were found in Pasig and Laguna, respectively. Both members were arrested on May 17.

== Immediate investigation ==
The following day, a headline by Armando Capili was released about the incident, who had seen the crime scene. The article reported that some of the bodies of the syndicate members had been handcuffed behind their backs, and some police officers put two ArmaLites inside the van full of bullet holes.

Capili's headline article didn't gain more attention until May 21 when SPO2 Eduardo de los Reyes came forward to ABS-CBN with an insight to the story that contradicted the official report and affirmed that police had actually executed the bank robbers. Also, due to money involved in the case (Kuratong's robbed money), rumors spread that it had been a police-operated money heist for the PACC chairman and then-Vice President Joseph Estrada.

After the CHR received a statement against the police officers on May 26, Acting Ombudsman Francisco Villa directed his deputy Manuel Casaclang to monitor the investigation process started by the Commission of Human Rights (CHR), the Senate Committee on Justice and Human Rights (led by Raul Roco), and the PNP's Directorate for Investigation. After three days, Cascalang sent requests to Roco and to CHR chairman for related documents. The CHR formalized the document the next day.

The same day, SPO2 Corazon de la Cruz appeared and testified before the Joint Senate Committee conducting a legislative inquiry, confirming and reaffirming the statement of SPO2 de los Reyes that there was no shootout but rather a massacre or a rubout. The two police officers stated that they arrested eight men the day before the incident at the Kuratong hideout in Las Piñas' Superville Subdivision, after which they housed them in Camp Crame, the national headquarters of the PNP. When they loaded them in a van, they included two other suspects; one of them was unrelated to the syndicate and unknown crimes. The van went then through Commonwealth Avenue (the road/place of the incident), and all of them died.

The National Bureau of Investigation (NBI) reported that there were policemen who raided the Superville and Alabang subdivisions, looting the syndicate's robbed money. They identified that eight were taken from Superville, while the ninth man and the tenth (Gemma's Siplon's husband) from Alabang were handcuffed, blindfolded, and driven into Camp Crame. She was pulled out and an eleventh male (the one with the unknown crime) got a ride to Commonwealth Avenue.

Following a Senate hearing, the top police officials Romeo Acop (Criminal Investigation Service Command), Jewel Canson (National Capital Region Command), and Senior Superintendent Francisco Zubia of Traffic Management Command all resigned, and a special police committee for investigation of the matter was recommended upon the filing of multiple murder charges against the three top police officials (adding Panfilo Lacson) and other policemen.

=== Senate investigation ===
A joint inquiry by the Senate committees on Public Order (led by Ernesto Maceda), Justice and Human Rights (led by Roco), and National Defense and Security (led by Orly Mercado) concluded that the victims killed at the scene were unarmed, while some people were killed while in police custody. They suggested that Chief Superintendents Lacson (Task Force Habagat chief), Canson, Acop, Zubia, and 15 other officers face murder or homicide charges.

== Subsequent cases and trials ==
On November 2, 1995, multiple murder charges were filed by newly appointed Ombudsman Aniano Desierto before the Sandiganbayan against Lacson. 26 other Philippine National Police officers (including Acop, Zubia, and Canson) were implicated.

After Desierto was appointed, police also ceased to oppose the preliminary probe. Prosecutor Leonardo Tamayo originally proposed a 98-person indictment, but Desierto dismissed Tamayo's indictment and instead formed a group of detectives that suggested reducing the indictment to 26 but still specifying Lacson as the principal and other senior officials as accomplices.

While standing trial before Sandiganbayan, the accused, mainly Lacson, requested a second Ombudsman probe. Although private prosecutors protested, the Ombudsman's legal team approved.

In December 1995, SPO2 de los Reyes stated that a businessman had offered him P5 million to go slow against Lacson. He was tasked to read scripted answers to questions asked in hearings in order to downgrade charges against Lacson. Two lawyers stood on behalf of Lacson twice. In 1996 February, the hearing for the case was held. Despite the insistence of de los Reyes' accounts, the Ombudsman dismissed the accusation.

Lacson also contested the Sandiganbayan's involvement in handling the case in 1999, as no higher official than a senior superintendent (police colonel) was charged as a principal. Sandiganbayan no longer had jurisdiction over the case. Many congressmen and senators looked into the receipt of 10 television sets from the businessman that De los Reyes had accused of trying to bribe him.

Lacson became PNP chief from 1999 until January 20, 2001, then retired officially in March 2001 in order to run for the senate. But when March 2001 came, three police officers surfaced to affirm the testimonies of the five witnesses. Police Inspector Ysmael Yu, now a SAF commando, stated in his sworn statement that he led an assault team at Superville on the night of May 17, 1995, because Canson dropped the orders, and he was briefed by Lacson, Acop, and Zubia. Also, he stated that the eight men arrested in the said subdivision that there were no fights against policemen or even a shootout.

Police Inspector Abelardo Ramos said that he and another policeman were assigned at the time with Zubia's Traffic Management Group. They were tasked with perimeter security and surveillance for the assault team. Like Inspector Yu, they are also briefed by those police officials after they had escorted the eight men to Camp Crame. Ramos and another policeman drove the ten handcuffed men to Commonwealth Avenue. Yu and Ramos' affidavits were endorsed by then-PNP Chief Leandro Mendoza.

Chief superintendent Reynaldo Berroya, Lacson's former colleague turned enemy, along with the Reform the PNP Movement, pushed the case revival in 2001. Upon a motion by Lacson, the criminal cases were remanded to the Ombudsman for reinvestigation. Subsequently, his participation in the crime was downgraded from principal to accessory. He pled not guilty when arraigned in 2002.

The special prosecuting team of Free Legal Assistance Group (FLAG), led by Jose Manuel Diokno, responded and later asked the High Tribunal to remand the case once more to the trial court in order to present new evidence against Lacson inter alia. On May 2, 2008, the Supreme Court of the Philippines approved Diokno's appeal, thereby reopening the case to prosecute implicated officers.

On November 12, 2003, Judge Theresa Yadao of the Quezon City Regional Trial Court Branch 81 junked the murder case against Lacson and other police officials for lack of probable cause. On December 5, 2012, the Supreme Court (SC) reaffirmed the 2003 court decision by vote of 14–0 even with Antonio Carpio inhibited. The finality of the SC ruling occurred on March 4, 2013.
