= Ping Lacson: Super Cop =

2000 Philippine action film directed by Toto Natividad

- Directed by: Toto Natividad
- Screenplay by: Willy Laconsay
- Story by: Raymond Burgos
- Produced by: Eric M. Cuatico
- Starring: Rudy Fernandez
- Cinematography: Ramon Marcelino; Rudy Diño
- Edited by: Joyce Bernal; Renewin B. Alano
- Music by: Edwin "Kiko" Ortega
- Production company: Millennium Cinema
- Distributed by: Millennium Cinema
- Release date: December 25, 2000
- Country: Philippines
- Language: Filipino

Ping Lacson: Super Cop is a 2000 Philippine biographical action film directed by Toto Natividad. The film stars Rudy Fernandez in the title role. The film is based on Panfilo "Ping" Lacson's career as a policeman. During this time, Lacson was the PNP Chief.

Produced by Millennium Cinema, the film was released on December 25, 2000 as an official entry for the 26th Metro Manila Film Festival. Less than a month after the film's release, Lacson himself participated in the Second EDSA Revolution (or EDSA II) in January 2001 that removed President Joseph Estrada from office, as well as the EDSA III protests in April 2001 that sought to return him to power.

== Plot ==
The film depicts the Kuratong Baleleng rubout in 1995, and showing the timeline of his career, from Philippine Military Academy, Metrocom Intelligence and Security Group, People Power Revolution, Presidential Anti-Crime Commission's "Task Force Habagat" into reaching PNP Chief post.

== Cast ==
- Rudy Fernandez as Panfilo "Ping" Lacson
  - Raphael Fernandez as young Ping Lacson
- Lorna Tolentino as Alice Lacson
- Herbert Bautista as Rivera
- Ricky Davao as Velayo
- Glydel Mercado as Rowena (based on Tina Monasterio)
- Ace Espinosa as Cebu criminal
- Trovador Ramos Jr. as man of Ping
- Jeffrey Santos as Boy Vitero
- Rez Cortez as Cebu town mayor
- Daisy Reyes as trigger woman
- Joey Padilla as man of Ping
- Levi Ignacio as man of Ping
- Noni Buencamino as Senior Superintendent Francisco Zubia
- Rommel Montano as Cebu criminal
- Patrick Dela Rosa as carnap gang leader
- Alvin Anson as man of Velayo
- Mike Gayoso as man of Velayo
- Arnel Acuba as man of Ping
- Marco Polo Garcia as Robina's abductor
- Edwin Reyes
- Gerald Ejercito
- Boy Roque as Vitero gang member
- Menggie Cobbarubias as Senator Orly Mercado
- Joonee Gamboa as Buenaventura, Ping Lacson's father
- Ray Ventura as Col. Rolando Abadilla
- Gamaliel "Gammy" Viray as Mendez
- Ernie Zarate as Senator Ernesto Maceda
- Joelle Pelaez as Girlie
- Pilar de Leon as Maxima, mother of Ping
- Jun Arenas as man of Velayo
- Rey Fabian as man of Velayo
- Gilbert Reyes as man of Velayo
- Bryan Homecillo as child of Ping
- Angelito Gutierrez as child of Ping
- Aron de Leon as child of Ping
- Lee Robin Salazar as Nonoy Zuñiga
- Eric Fresnido as Vitero gang member
- Jun Perez as Vitero gang member
- Rey Comia as Vitero gang member
- Renato Comia as Vitero gang member
- Poly Cadsawan as Sgt. Alvizo
- Bon Vibar as Ed Ulap
- Sonny Bernardo as Senator Raul Roco
- Angelica Colmenares as Robina Gokongwei
- Melody Panganiban as cousin of Robina
- Junar Aristorenas as Robina's abductor
- Banjo Romero as Robina's abductor
- TJ Calalay as Robina's abductor
- Noli Tolentino as Robina's abductor
- Jeffrey Lumcuando as Robina's abductor
- Johnny Chang as John Gokongwei
- Jun Hidalgo as Kuratong member
- July Hidalgo as Kuratong member
- Allan Garcia as Delos Riyos
- Cris Daluz as activist leader
- Lucita Soriano as lady mourner
- Jun Lincuan as field reporter
- Sauro Gotoko as Chinese kidnap victim
- Louie Saludes as Jack Chao
- Annabel Macauba as MTV floor director

Lt. Gen. Diomedio Villanueva has an uncredited cameo in the film.

== Production ==
Millennium Cinema, a production company established in 1999 by the family of President Joseph Estrada, produced the film. Filming began in Baguio City on August 5, 2000, in which the PMA graduation scene of young Ping Lacson (portrayed by Raphael Fernandez) was shot. Lead actor Rudy Fernandez, who was the first choice to portray Lacson, has cited his role as the titular policeman to be "my most demanding, most challenging role."

Lacson has the described the film as "only 35 percent accurate". He gave his permission to the filmmakers to depict his affair with actress Tina Monasterio.

=== Controversy ===
Kilusang Mayo Uno, a left-wing group called for a boycott of Ping Lacson, as they stated that Lacson was not a hero, but a corrupt police officer who kills innocent people. The group also stated that the film only distracted the public from the corruption of then-President Joseph Estrada.

== Release ==
Ping Lacson was released on December 25, 2000 as one of the official entries for the 26th Metro Manila Film Festival (MMFF).

Less than a month after the film's release, PNP Chief Lacson's removal of support for President Joseph Estrada resulted in the latter's ouster in the Second EDSA Revolution on January 20, 2001.

== Accolades ==
Award-giving body	Category	Result
2000 Metro Manila Film Festival	Best Film	Nominated

== See also ==
- 10,000 Hours, a 2013 action film inspired by Lacson's life
- Bato (The General Ronald dela Rosa Story), a 2019 biographical action film that was released prior to the titular policeman's senatorial campaign
