= Francisco Zubia =

Filipino former police general

Francisco G. Zubia Jr.

Personal details
- Born: Francisco Grasparil Zubia Jr. May 28, 1948 (age 78) Baler, Aurora
- Party: Independent
- Spouse: Perla Barangan (deceased)
- Children: 4 (Francisco III, Percival, Frederick and Primrose)
- Other names: Twiggy, Kiko
- Education: Philippine Military Academy
- Police career
- Service: Philippine National Police
- Divisions: PACC - Task Force Habagat; Traffic Management Group; Criminal Investigation and Detection Group
- Police offices: Nueva Ecija PPO
- Rank: Police Director

Francisco Zubia Jr. is a retired police general and politician.

== Police career ==
Zubia graduated from the Philippine Military Academy in 1971 along with notable batchmates Panfilo Lacson, Gregorio Honasan and Edgar Aglipay. Zubia and Lacson later became colleagues at the Presidential Anti-Crime Commission.

Zubia and Lacson among other personnel were involved in a shootout with 11 members of Kuratong Baleleng but were subsequently acquitted by a lower court in November 2003 for lack of probable cause. At that time of the incident, Zubia headed the Traffic Management Command (now known as Highway Patrol Group).

Zubia served as chief of the Criminal Investigation and Detection Group (CIDG) when Lacson was the Philippine National Police chief in the early 2000s.

== Political career ==
Zubia ran for mayor of Baler in 2013, but placed second against then-outgoing Vice Mayor Nelianto Bihasa in a 3-way race.
