= Teodulo Topacio Sr. =

Filipino veterinarian (1887–1939)

Teodulo Topacio
- Born: Teodulo C. Topacio; March 20, 1887
- Died: June 19, 1939 (aged 52)
- Education: University of the Philippines Diliman
- Medical career
- Profession: Veterinarian
- Field: Veterinary medicine
- Institutions: Bureau of Animal Industry (Philippines)

Teodulo C. Topacio Sr. (March 20, 1887 – June 19, 1939) was a Filipino veterinarian recognized for contributing for the eradication of rinderpest in the Philippines

== Early life and education ==
Teodulo C. Topacio was born on March 20, 1887, to an illustrado family. He hails from Cavite. His father Cayetano Topacio was the deputy minister of finance in the cabinet of President Emilio Aguinaldo during the revolutionary government.

He was selected as a scholar in 1905 under the Pensionado Act which sent him to the United States to study at the University of Nebraska. He graduated in 1909 with a bachelor's degree.

From 1912 to 1915, he studied at the College of Veterinary Science of University of the Philippines Manila Topacio returned to America in 1927, to attend the State College of Washington and obtained his master's degree in bacteriology the following year. He did graduate work in bacteriology and pathology at the University of Pennsylvania. He then studied at the Johns Hopkins University from 1930 to 1931, graduating with a doctorate degree in hygiene. The topic of his thesis was about filterable virus.

== Career ==
Topacio and his colleagues were tasked to improve the vaccine for rinderpest developed by William Boynton in 1923.

In February 1926, the United States Army Medical Department Research Board, at the request of Governor-General Leonard Wood and the Bureau of Agriculture, conducted a study to improve the vaccine. Major Raymond Kelser led the group that conducted the study with other members included Topacio, Stanton Youngberg, and Ildefonso Patdu. The chloroform-treated wet tissue vaccine was developed within months with Filipino veterinarians Manuel Robles and Juan Generoso in 1931 modifying the vaccine to extend its shelf life.

Until his death, Topacio served as head of the veterinary research division of the Philippines' Bureau of Animal Industry.

== Personal life and death ==
Topaico had a son son, Teodulo Jr. who grew up to be a veterinarian who studied leptospirosis in the Philippines. He died on June 19, 1939, of apoplexy caused by hypertension. Rinderpest was also eradicated in the Philippines by the end of the year.
