= Rommel Banlaoi =

Philippine international-security specialist

- Born: Rommel C. Banlaoi; April 27, 1970 (age 56)

Academic background
- Education: University of the Philippines Diliman (BA, MA); Jinan University (PhD)

Rommel C. Banlaoi (27 April 1970) is a Filipino political scientist, security analyst, an international studies expert, counterterrorism scholar, and a sinologist. He was nominated and designated as a Deputy National Security Adviser with the rank of Undersecretary in July 2022 to lead in the transition process at the National Security Council Secretariat. But he has returned to his work as an independent scholar and a non-government subject matter expert on geopolitics, peace and security studies; counterterrorism research; and, China studies. He is a celebrity professor and policy influencer known for his scholarly works on international terrorism (specifically on the Abu Sayyaf Group), South China disputes, foreign affairs and geopolitical issues. He is the Chairman of the Philippine Institute for Peace, Violence and Terrorism Research (PIPVTR) and President of the Philippine Society for International Security Studies (PSISS), both academic and non-governmental organizations.

== Education ==
Banlaoi finished his BA and MA in Political Science at the University of the Philippines in Diliman where he also worked on his PhD in Political Science (ABD Status). He earned his PhD in International Relations at Jinan University in Guangzhou, China.

== Career ==
Banlaoi began his career as an Instructor in Political Science at the University of the Philippines Los Baños from 1992 to 1995. He then served as a University Research Associate at the University of the Philippines Diliman in 1996. Subsequently, he became an Assistant Professor of International Studies at De La Salle University from 1997 to 1998. He was later appointed as a Professor of Political Science and International Relations at the National Defense College of the Philippines from 1998 to 2008, where he also served as Vice President from 1998 to 2001.

Prior to his academic career at NDCP, he worked at the Office of the Secretary of National Defense (OSND) during the administration of President Joseph Estrada. While at NDCP, he was detailed to the Office of the Assistant Secretary for Plans and Programs (OASPP) during the administration of President Gloria Macapagal Arroyo. During Arroyo's term, Banlaoi served as a senior adviser at the League of Municipalities of the Philippines (LMP), founded the Mayor's Development Center (MDC), and worked as a consultant at the National Counter-Terrorism Action Group (NACTAG), the precursor to the Philippine Anti-Terrorism Council (ATC) established by the Human Security Act of 2007, which has since been replaced by the Philippine Anti-Terrorism Law of 2020.

He was appointed as a member of the Advisory Council of the Criminal Investigation and Detection Group (CIDG) of the Philippine National Police (PNP) during President Benigno Simeon Aquino III's administration and later as a member of the Advisory Council of the PNP Drug Enforcement Group (PDEG) under President Rodrigo Roa Duterte. In 2021, he was reappointed as a member of the National Advisory Group of the CIDG and eventually elected as its Vice Chairman for External Affairs. Additionally, Banlaoi served as Professor and Director for Research and Publication at World City College (WCC) from 2004 to 2005 and as a member of the Board of Regents of the University of Eastern Pangasinan (UEP) in 2006. Since 2011, he has been teaching at the Department of International Studies at Miriam College in the Philippines.

== Awards ==
Banlaoi received in June 2021 the Award for Outstanding Contribution in the Promotion of Philippines-China Understanding offered by the Association of Philippines-China Understanding (APCU) and the Chinese Embassy in the Philippines. Because of his involvement in peace education, terrorism research and non-violence studies, he received the Albani Peace Prize Award for Peace Education. On the occasion of the 2016 World CSR (Corporate Social Responsibility) Congress Day in Mumbai, India, Banlaoi received the Award for Outstanding Contribution to Humanitarian and Social Cause. Banlaoi has been described by Borer, Everton and Nayve the "leading Philippine scholar studying radical Islam".

== Affiliations ==
Dr. Banlaoi is currently the Chairman of the Board of Advisers of the China Studies Center of the School of International Relations at New Era University. He served as the President of the Philippine Association for Chinese Studies (PACS) from 2018 to 2022 and became a member of the Management Board of the World Association for Chinese Studies (WACS) in 2019. He is currently the Director of the Center for the Study of Philippines-China Relations (CSPCR), the research arm of the Philippines-China Friendship Society (PCFS), where he serves as a co-convenor representing the Philippine side.

He is also a member of the International Panel of Experts of the Maritime Awareness Project (MAP) of the National Bureau of Asian Research (NBR) and the Sasakawa Peace Foundation (SPF) based in Washington, DC, while serving as a member of the Board of Directors of the China-Southeast Asia Research Centre on the South China Sea based in Hainan, China. He served as a member of the Philippine Council for Foreign Relations (PCFR) and a Senior Fellow at the Yuchengco Centre (YC) of De La Salle University (DLSU), where three of his scholarly works were published.

Dr. Banlaoi is an Adjunct Research Professor at the National Institute for South China Sea Studies based in Hainan, China. He contributes to the official publications of the Southeast Asian Regional Center for Counter-Terrorism (SEARCCT) based in Kuala Lumpur. He served as Chairman of the Council for Asian Terrorism Research, a consortium of some of the best research organizations on counter-terrorism in the Asia Pacific region.

He was also appointed as a Non-Resident Fellow of the Center for Global Counterterrorism Cooperation based in New York City. He was a Fellow of the Asia Pacific Center for Security Studies (APCSS) based in Hawaii, USA and a Visiting Fellow at the Faculty of Law of Leiden University in the Netherlands. He is currently the Convenor of the Network for the Prevention of Violent Extremism in the Philippines (NPVEP).

== Books ==
- Philippines-China Relations at 45 During the COVID-19 Pandemic: New Discoveries, Recent Developments, and Continuing Concerns
- The Marawi Siege and Its Aftermath: The Continuing Terrorist Threats
- Philippines-China Relations: Geopolitics, Economics and Counterterrorism<
- Al-Harakatul Al-Islamiyyah: Essays on the Abu Sayyaf Group, Terrorism in the Philippines from Al Qaeda to ISIS
- Marawi City Siege and Threats of Narcoterrorism in the Philippines.
- Philippine Security in the Age of Terror
- Philippines-China Security Relations: Current Issues and Emerging Concerns
- Security Aspects of Philippines-China Relations
- Defense and Military Cooperation Between the Philippines and China: Broadening Bilateral Ties in the Post 9/11 Era
- Current and Emerging Security Environment in Southeast Asia
- De-radicalization Efforts in the Philippines: Options for Disengagement Strategy
- Al Harakatul Al Islammiyah:Essays on the Abu Sayyaf Group
- Counter-Terrorism Measures in Southeast Asia: How Effective Are They;
- War on Terrorism in Southeast Asia.
- Maritime Terrorism in Southeast Asia: The Abu Sayyaf Threat
- The Philippines and Australia: Defense and Security Cooperation Against Terrorism
- The ASEAN Regional Forum, the South China Sea Conflict and the Functionalist Option
- Security Cooperation in the ASEAN Regional Forum and in the European Union: Lessons Learned
- The Amsterdam Treaty and the European Union's Common Foreign and Security Policy
- Political Parties in the Philippines
- Elections in the Philippines
