= Philippine Senate Committee on National Defense and Security, Peace, Unification and Reconciliation =

Standing committee of the Senate of the Philippines

Committee on National Defense and Security, Peace, Unification and Reconciliation
- Senate of the Philippines; 20th Congress

History
- New session started: July 28, 2025

Leadership
- Chair: Loren Legarda (NPC) since September 8, 2025

Structure
- Seats: 20
- Political groups: Majority (12): NPC (4); Nacionalista (3); Akbayan (1); KANP (1); Lakas (1); Liberal (1); Independent (1); Minority (8): PDP (3); Nacionalista (1); NPC (1); PMP (1); Independent (2)

The Philippine Senate Committee on National Defense and Security, Peace, Unification and Reconciliation is a standing committee of the Senate of the Philippines.

This committee was formed after the Committee on National Defense and Security and the Committee on Peace, Unification and Reconciliation were merged on September 3, 2019, pursuant to Senate Resolution No. 9 of the 18th Congress.

== Jurisdiction ==
According to the Rules of the Senate, the committee handles all matters relating to:

- National defense and external and internal threats to national security
- Peace, internal armed conflict resolution, political negotiation, cessation of hostilities, amnesty, rebel returnees, integration and development, national unification and reconciliation
- The Department of National Defense
  - Armed Forces of the Philippines
- The Philippine Coast Guard
- The National Security Council
- The Office of the Presidential Adviser on Peace, Reconciliation and Unity
- The National Intelligence Coordinating Agency
- The National Task Force to End Local Communist Armed Conflict (NTF-ELCAC)
- The Office of the Presidential Adviser on Military Affairs
- Pension plans and fringe benefits of war veterans and military retirees
- Citizens army selective service
- Forts
- Arsenals
- Military camps and reservations
- Coast, geodetic and meteorological surveys
- Civil defense
- Military research and development

== Members, 20th Congress ==
Based on the Rules of the Senate, the Senate Committee on National Defense and Security, Peace, Unification and Reconciliation has 20 members.

Position	Member	Party
Chairperson	Loren Legarda	NPC
Vice Chairpersons	Ronald dela Rosa	PDP
Vice Chairpersons	Jinggoy Estrada	PMP
Vice Chairpersons	Bong Go	PDP
Vice Chairpersons	Panfilo Lacson (Note: Ex officio member as Senate President pro tempore; not counted in the membership.)	Independent
Deputy Majority Leaders	JV Ejercito	NPC
Deputy Majority Leaders	Risa Hontiveros	Akbayan
Members for the Majority	Bam Aquino	KANP
Members for the Majority	Pia Cayetano	Nacionalista
Members for the Majority	Win Gatchalian	NPC
Members for the Majority	Lito Lapid	NPC
Members for the Majority	Kiko Pangilinan	Liberal
Members for the Majority	Erwin Tulfo	Lakas
Members for the Majority	Raffy Tulfo	Independent
Members for the Majority	Camille Villar	Nacionalista
Members for the Majority	Mark Villar	Nacionalista
Deputy Minority Leaders	Rodante Marcoleta	Independent
Deputy Minority Leaders	Joel Villanueva	Independent
Members for the Minority	Francis Escudero	NPC
Members for the Minority	Imee Marcos	Nacionalista
Members for the Minority	Robin Padilla	PDP

Ex officio members:

- Majority Floor Leader Juan Miguel Zubiri
- Minority Floor Leader Alan Peter Cayetano

Committee secretary: Norliza R. Villanueva

== Historical membership rosters ==
=== 19th Congress ===
Position	Member	Party
Chairperson	Jinggoy Estrada	PMP
Vice Chairpersons	Ronald dela Rosa	PDP–Laban
Vice Chairpersons	Bong Go	PDP–Laban
Vice Chairpersons	Robin Padilla	PDP–Laban
Vice Chairpersons	Bong Revilla	Lakas
Members for the Majority	JV Ejercito	NPC
Members for the Majority	Mark Villar	Nacionalista
Members for the Majority	Nancy Binay	UNA
Members for the Majority	Alan Peter Cayetano	Independent
Members for the Majority	Pia Cayetano	Nacionalista
Members for the Majority	Win Gatchalian	NPC
Members for the Majority	Lito Lapid	NPC
Members for the Majority	Loren Legarda	NPC
Members for the Majority	Imee Marcos	Nacionalista
Members for the Majority	Grace Poe	Independent
Members for the Majority	Raffy Tulfo	Independent
Members for the Majority	Joel Villanueva	Independent
Members for the Majority	Cynthia Villar	Nacionalista
Members for the Majority	Juan Miguel Zubiri	Independent
Member for the Minority	Risa Hontiveros	Akbayan

Committee secretary: Norliza Villanueva

=== 18th Congress ===
Position	Member	Party
Chairperson	Panfilo Lacson	Independent
Vice Chairpersons	Francis Tolentino	PDP–Laban
Vice Chairpersons	Grace Poe	Independent
Vice Chairpersons	Ronald dela Rosa	PDP–Laban
Vice Chairpersons	Bong Go	PDP–Laban
Vice Chairpersons	Richard Gordon	Independent
Vice Chairpersons	Manny Pacquiao	PDP–Laban
Members for the Majority	Lito Lapid	NPC
Members for the Majority	Joel Villanueva	CIBAC
Members for the Majority	Imee Marcos	Nacionalista
Members for the Majority	Nancy Binay	UNA
Members for the Majority	Sonny Angara	LDP
Members for the Majority	Bong Revilla	Lakas
Members for the Majority	Win Gatchalian	NPC
Members for the Majority	Cynthia Villar	Nacionalista
Members for the Majority	Koko Pimentel	PDP–Laban
Members for the Minority	Francis Pangilinan	Liberal
Members for the Minority	Risa Hontiveros	Akbayan
Members for the Minority	Leila de Lima	Liberal

Committee secretary: Charlyne Claire Fuentes-Olay

== See also ==
- List of Philippine Senate committees
