= Panfilo Lacson =

Senator of the Philippines since 2025 and former police officer (born 1948)

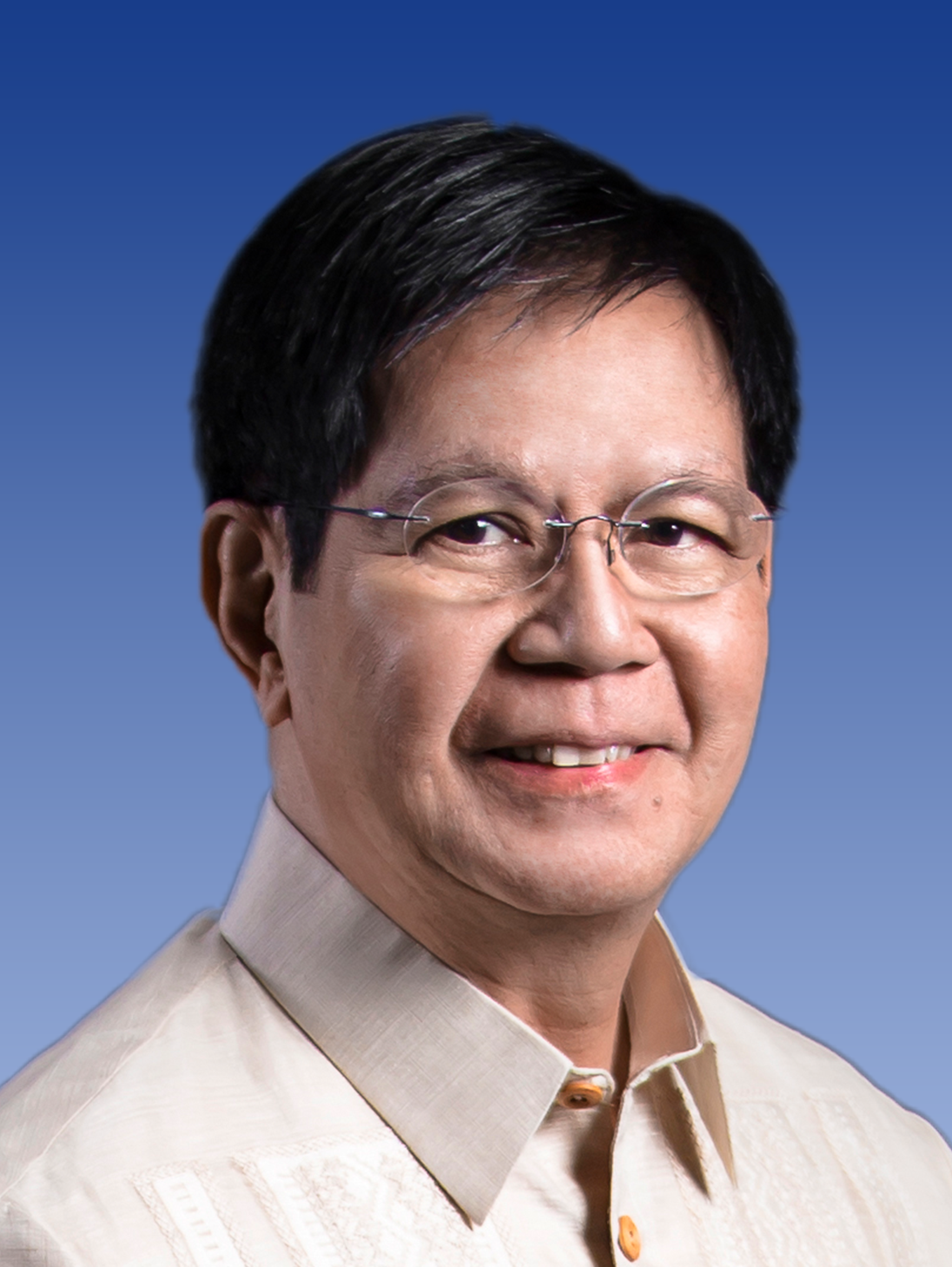
- Portrait of Lacson as member of the Philippine Commission on Appointments

President pro tempore of the Senate of the Philippines
- In office September 8, 2025 – May 11, 2026
- Preceded by: Jinggoy Estrada
- Succeeded by: Loren Legarda

Senator of the Philippines
- Incumbent
- Assumed office June 30, 2025
- In office June 30, 2016 – June 30, 2022
- In office June 30, 2001 – June 30, 2013
Committee positions
Chair of the Senate Blue Ribbon Committee
In office November 11, 2025 – May 20, 2026
| Preceded by | Erwin Tulfo (acting) |
| Succeeded by | Pia Cayetano |
In office September 8, 2025 – October 5, 2025
| Preceded by | Rodante Marcoleta |
| Succeeded by | Erwin Tulfo (acting) |
Chair of the Senate Electoral Reforms and People's Participation Committee
In office July 30, 2025 – January 26, 2026
| Preceded by | Imee Marcos |
| Succeeded by | Risa Hontiveros |
Chair of the Senate Accounts Committee
In office July 24, 2019 – June 30, 2022
| Preceded by | Gregorio Honasan |
| Succeeded by | Nancy Binay |
Chair of the Senate National Defense and Security Committee
In office July 23, 2019 – June 30, 2022
| Preceded by | Gregorio Honasan |
| Succeeded by | Jinggoy Estrada |

Presidential Assistant for Rehabilitation and Recovery
- In office December 10, 2013 – February 10, 2015
- President: Benigno Aquino III

Chief of the Philippine National Police
- In office November 16, 1999 – January 20, 2001 (Note: Leandro Mendoza seated as acting PNP chief from January 21, 2001. But due to Lacson's age of retirement having not being reached after his resignation (still at 53), Mendoza's rank is Deputy Director General until March 15, 2001, when Lacson formally retired.)
- President: Joseph Estrada; Gloria Macapagal-Arroyo
- Preceded by: Edmundo Larroza
- Succeeded by: Leandro Mendoza

Personal details
- Born: Panfilo Morena Lacson; June 1, 1948 (age 78) Imus, Cavite, Philippines
- Party: Independent (2004–2021; 2022–present)
- Other political affiliations: Reporma (2021–2022); LDP (2001–2004)
- Spouse: Alice de Perio
- Children: Four
- Education: Philippine Military Academy (BS); Pamantasan ng Lungsod ng Maynila (MPA)
- Occupation: Politician; former police general
- Website: Official website

Military service
- Branch/service: Philippine Constabulary
- Years of service: 1971–1991
- Commands: MetroCom Intelligence and Security Group (MISG, as deputy commander); Isabela Provincial PC; PC-INP Anti Carnapping Task Force; Cebu Metropolitan District Command (Cebu MetroDisCom)
- Police career
- Service: Philippine Constabulary; Philippine National Police
- Division: Presidential Anti-Organized Crime Task Force (PAOCTF); Task Force Habagat – Presidential Anti-Crime Commission
- Police office: Laguna Provincial Police
- Service years: 1991–2001
- Rank: Director General

Panfilo "Ping" Morena Lacson Sr. (Tagalog pronunciation: [ˈlakson]; born June 1, 1948) is a Filipino politician and former police officer who has served as a senator of the Philippines since 2025 and president pro tempore from 2025 until 2026. He previously served as a senator from 2001 to 2013 and from 2016 to 2022. Lacson is also a former police general who served as director general of the Philippine National Police (PNP) from 1999 to 2001. He was a candidate in the 2004 and 2022 Philippine presidential elections.

During his tenure as the chief of the PNP, he was known for instituting various reforms within the organization. Despite some controversies, his high approval rating and high-profile anti-corruption campaigns were key to his Senate bid in 2001, where he won and placed tenth in the elections. In January 2001, Lacson's withdrawal of police support for President Joseph Estrada was critical to Estrada's ouster in EDSA II. However, after Estrada was arrested on April 25, 2001, Lacson was among the politicians who spoke against his removal from office at pro-Estrada rallies that preceded the May 1 riots near Malacañang Palace. He ran for the presidency in 2004 but lost, though he continued to serve as senator until 2007. He won another six-year term in 2007.

After his first two terms in the Senate, Lacson was appointed by then-President Benigno Aquino III as Presidential Assistant for Rehabilitation and Recovery in December 2013. He led the management and rehabilitation efforts of the central provinces in the Philippines affected by Typhoon Haiyan (Yolanda). In the 2016 elections, Lacson ran for senator and won, ranking fourth in the said elections.

Lacson made another attempt for the presidency of the Philippines during the 2022 Philippine presidential election, where he placed fifth, losing to Bongbong Marcos. After the election, Lacson said he would contribute to food security through an agri-aqua business.

Lacson's career in law enforcement became the basis of two local action films: Task Force Habagat (1993) and Ping Lacson: Super Cop (2000).

== Early life and education ==
Panfilo Morena Lacson was born in Imus, Cavite on June 1, 1948. His mother, Maxima, a market vendor, was a disciplinarian who instilled distinctions between right and wrong with her children. His father, Buenaventura, was a jeepney driver whose experiences with "kotong cops" (extortionist policemen) eventually inspired him to fight extortion and other forms of corruption. In a post on X/Twitter in May 2024, Lacson also said he got his "discipline, integrity and survival instinct" from his mother.

According to a family tradition recounted by Panfilo Lacson in 2022, his Lacson lineage is said to be descended from three trader brothers who settled in Molo, Iloilo during the Spanish colonial period, with branches later established in Iloilo, Negros Occidental, and in areas of Luzon, particularly Imus, Cavite, from which he traces his descent. He described the Iloilo and Negros branches as having become more prosperous while the branches eventually lost contact with one another, which he presented as suggesting a possible link between the Luzon-based branch and Lacson families in Western Visayas.

He finished grade school at the Bayan Luma Elementary School in 1960 and high school at the Imus Institute in 1964. While Lacson initially wanted to be an agent of the National Bureau of Investigation, he was invited by a classmate to take the entrance exams at the Philippine Military Academy. Lacson passed but the classmate who invited him did not.

After his graduation from the PMA in 1971, Lacson was commissioned in the Philippine Constabulary (PC), then a major service of the Armed Forces of the Philippines (AFP) responsible for maintaining peace and order and enforcement of laws in the country.

In 1996, he earned a postgraduate degree of Master in Government Management from the Pamantasan ng Lungsod ng Maynila.

Meanwhile, Lacson's advocacy against the pork barrel system and the corruption associated with him was cited by the Pamantasan ng Lungsod ng Maynila when it conferred on him the degree of Doctor of Laws, Honoris Causa, on March 27, 2019.

Lacson also received from the Philippine Military Academy the prestigious Lifetime Achievement Award on February 19, 2022, in recognition of his "more than 50 years of “dedicated, exemplary and unblemished service to the country characterized by his faithful adherence to the virtues of Courage, Loyalty and Integrity."

== Police career ==
=== Early career: PC, PNP, PACC (1971–1999) ===
Lacson worked at the Philippine Constabulary Metropolitan Command (Metrocom)'s Intelligence and Security Group (MISG) from 1971 to 1986. Lacson, whose work involved mainly intelligence-gathering, rose through the ranks, becoming Lieutenant Colonel in the mid-1980s. After the 1986 People Power Revolution, he served at the PC-INP Anti-Carnapping Task Force as its commander from 1986 to 1988, as provincial commander of the province of Isabela from 1988 to 1989, and as commander of the Cebu Metropolitan District Command (Metrodiscom) from 1989 to 1992. In 1991, he joined the then-newly created civilian Philippine National Police, or PNP, formed as a result of the merger of the military Philippine Constabulary and the civilian Integrated National Police or INP. (The INP was formed in 1975 as an integration of all local police forces in the country then under operational control of the PC.) Soon Lacson became Provincial Director of the province of Laguna from February to July 1992. Afterwards, he was appointed Chief of Task Force Habagat at the Presidential Anti-Crime Commission from 1992 to 1995. From 1996 to April 1997, he was given the task of project officer of "Special Project Alpha." Lacson was appointed Chief of the PNP on November 18, 1999.

American historian Alfred W. McCoy claimed in his 1999 book Closer Than Brothers that Lacson was among those in MISG who tortured prisoners during martial law in the 1970s, which Lacson has vehemently denied. A court case filed in 1983 by alleged martial law torture victims against Lacson and other military officers was closed by 2012 when the Supreme Court upheld the Court of Appeal's 2003 ruling that reversed the Quezon City Regional Trial Court's order for the military officers to pay damages to their alleged victims due to the decision lacking "procedural due process".

==== Anti-kidnapping and no-take policy ====
While serving in the Philippine Constabulary's Metropolitan Command, Lacson's work involved mainly solving crimes, including kidnap-for-ransom incidents. In 1981, Lacson was a Lieutenant Colonel with the PC-Metrocom, when he led a team that rescued now-tycoon Robina Gokongwei-Pe, daughter of businessman John Gokongwei Jr., from a kidnap-for-ransom gang.

Robina's family offered Lacson and his team a reward, but Lacson declined it, as part of his no-take policy. Lacson explained he does not want his men to have the wrong mentality of not helping "gusgusin" (poor) complainants who cannot afford to give them rewards. The Gokongweis eventually decided to show their gratitude by donating mobile patrol vehicles to the PC, coursing it through then PC chief Maj. Gen. Fidel Ramos.

In a Twitter post, Lacson recalled advising the elder Gokongwei not to sound intimidated while negotiating with the kidnappers. He said that after Robina's rescue, the elder Gokongwei offered P400,000 as reward money, which he declined. Instead, Gokongwei donated 10 mobile cars to the PC Metrocom. Robina recounted details of the incident in her eulogy to her father.

During his stint in Cebu, Lacson rescued the son of a Cebu-based retail magnate. The victim's family intended to give the money they prepared as ransom to Lacson and his operatives as a reward, but Lacson declined it. Lacson was said to have told the victim's family that a mere "thank you" was more than enough for him. In 1992, Lacson was recruited to the Presidential Anti-Crime Commission chaired by then Vice President Joseph Estrada. Lacson headed the PACC's Task Force Habagat, which would go on to solve several kidnap-for-ransom cases.

Lacson, who would later head the Philippine National Police from 1999 to 2001, founded the PNP Foundation in 2000, as a way for civic-minded people to give contributions for the benefit of the PNP as an institution.

==== Anti-jueteng campaign ====
Aside from kidnap-for-ransom gangs, jueteng and other forms of illegal gambling were also in Lacson's sights when he was in the PC, and eventually in the Philippine National Police.

In 1992, he bared an attempt by local jueteng operators in Laguna to bribe him, initially to the tune of P1.2 million a month. He rejected the offer.

Lacson maintained an all-out effort against jueteng, even if in the process he crossed paths with eventual President Joseph Estrada.

=== PAOCTF chief (1998–2001) ===
Under the Estrada administration, Lacson headed the Presidential Anti-Organized Crime Task Force (PAOCTF), bringing to zero the number of kidnap-for-ransom cases. The PAOCTF also scored high against drug trafficking, smuggling activities, carnapping, illegal possession of firearms and other nefarious activities.

=== PNP chief: Reforms and kotong cops (1999–2001) ===
While heading the Presidential Anti-Organized Crime Task Force (PAOCTF), he was appointed to serve as Philippine National Police Chief in 1999, but did not get his 4-star rank due to former Santiago Aliño's retirement issues since 1998. He only got the 4-star rank in March 2000.

Lacson's notable accomplishments were the reduction of corrupt policemen (Kotong Cops) and various organized crime syndicates engaged in kidnapping, drug trafficking, and other illegal activities.

As Chief PNP, Lacson eliminated the "Kotong culture" (bribe culture) among the police officers. He rationalized the distribution of financial and logistical resources by downloading 85 percent to the police frontline units, retaining only 15 percent in the police headquarters. He imposed a strict physical fitness test on all PNP members, invoking a 34-inch maximum waistline for police officers.

Lacson refused to accept bribe money from illegal gambling operators and contractors and suppliers transacting business with the PNP, declining offers of monetary rewards from kidnap-for-ransom victims after rescuing them from their captors.

Meanwhile, Lacson downloaded 85% of the PNP's budget to the operating units to improve the overall management, while removing excess privileges of top police officials.

Most importantly, Lacson stopped the practice of "kotong cops," who extort money from public utility drivers, vegetable and rice dealers, and vendors.

Under Lacson's leadership, the PNP earned a whopping 64% approval rating in July and October 2000, the highest ever recorded from the Filipino people. Lacson himself got an approval rating of 73% as Chief PNP in July 2000, thus regaining the PNP's glory years by restoring public trust in the police force.

Lacson resigned on January 22, 2001, due EDSA Dos, but only retired formally on March 16, 2001. That late retirement made Leandro Mendoza's promotion to the rank Director General delayed, even Mendoza was instilled as the new PNP Chief.

==== Kuratong Baleleng case ====
The Kuratong Baleleng of the 1990s was a criminal gang linked to a series of violent crimes that included kidnappings and bank robberies. In some of the robberies, the gang's members would gun down security guards and innocent bystanders.

In 1995, members of a composite task group assigned to stop robberies in Metro Manila were linked to the killing of 11 members of Kuratong Baleleng in Quezon City. The PACC was a part of the composite task force.

In 2003, the High Tribunal ordered the Quezon City Regional Trial Court to try the case against Lacson and 33 other police officials. The trial court dismissed the criminal case, finding absence of probable cause. The special prosecuting team later moved for new trial before the High Tribunal to remand case to the trial court to present new evidence against then-Senator Lacson, inter alia. On May 2, 2008, the Supreme Court of the Philippines resolved to take cognizance of the motion of the families of the slain Kuratong Baleleng members for revival of the murder case against police officials and Senator Panfilo Lacson.

On November 13, 2012, the Supreme Court in an en banc decision denied the government's motion to revive the case and affirmed the lower court's decision dismissing it.

==== Dacer–Corbito murder case ====
On November 24, 2000, publicist Salvador "Bubby" Dacer and his driver Emmanuel Corbito were abducted in Makati. In April 2001, their burnt corpses were found by a creek in Indang, Cavite. The Department of Justice filed double murder charges against Police Senior Superintendent Michael Ray Aquino and other police officers, including Senior Superintendent Cezar Mancao II and Senior Superintendent Glenn Dumlao – all members of Presidential Anti-Organized Crime Task Force (PAOCTF) headed by then Police Director-General Panfilo Lacson.

In his 2001 affidavit, Senior Superintendent Glenn Dumlao implicated then President Joseph Estrada and then Director-General Panfilo Lacson in the Dacer–Corbito Murder Case. Both Estrada and Lacson denied their involvement.

In 2009, former police senior superintendent Cezar Mancao II named Lacson as the mastermind of the murders of Salvador Dacer and Emmanuel Corbito. The allegations were made in an affidavit that Mancao signed on February 14, 2009. Mancao was allegedly present when Lacson gave the hit order to then Police Senior Superintendent Michael Ray Aquino sometime in October 2000.

Lacson denied these allegations, stating that the Office of the President had pressured Mancao to sign the affidavit.

On January 5, 2010, Lacson left the Philippines on a Cathay Pacific flight to Hong Kong, shortly before charges against him were filed in court. He became a fugitive for the next fifteen months. He had been spotted in Hong Kong and Rome but was never apprehended.

On February 5, 2010, Branch 18 of the Regional Trial Court in Manila issued an arrest warrant against him. On February 11, 2010, Interpol issued a Red Notice for Lacson.

On February 3, 2011, the Court of Appeals withdrew the murder charges against the senator (SP-116057). Its decision cited Mancao as "not a credible and trustworthy witness". Mancao has since turned fugitive after escaping from the custody of the National Bureau of Investigation in May 2013.

Lacson returned to the country on March 26, 2011, a month after the Supreme Court affirmed the Court of Appeals' ruling on the case.

In a 2015 interview with the media, Mancao (still a fugitive) apologized to Lacson and Estrada for linking them in the Dacer–Corbito murders, admitting that he had no personal knowledge on the supposed involvement of the two. He also claimed that he was forced by the Arroyo administration to implicate their names.

=== PNP Foundation chair ===
While he has retired from the police service, Lacson continues to help the PNP in his capacity as chairman of the PNP Foundation Inc., which donates equipment and other needs of the police force - including support for a project to put up an Open University in collaboration with the University of the Philippines. This will allow PNP personnel to take up required and special training courses online, without necessarily leaving their places of assignment.

As senator from 2017 to 2022, Lacson also amended to augment the budget of the PNP in the annual General Appropriations Act in the total amount of P8,069,970,000 - aside from authoring, sponsoring or co-authoring landmark legislations benefiting the PNP. "I can proudly say without mental reservation and fear of contradiction, being your former Chief, I have paid my dues to the men and women of this proud organization both active and retired", Lacson said in his remarks before the PNP on Aug. 15, 2022.

=== EDSA Tres ===
From April 26 to 30, 2001, together with Juan Ponce Enrile, Gregorio Honasan, Miriam Defensor Santiago and Tito Sotto, he spoke at the EDSA III rallies that called for Gloria Macapagal Arroyo's resignation and the reinstatement of Estrada to the presidency. On May 1, 2001, the protesters stormed Malacañang Palace.

== Senate of the Philippines (2001–2013) ==
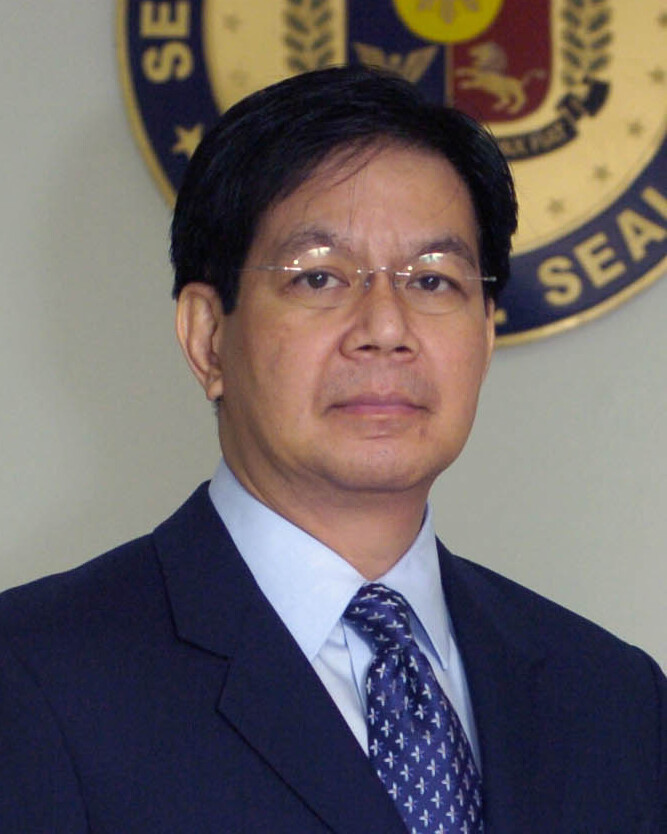
Official portrait, 2007

Lacson ran for senator in the 2001 elections under the Laban ng Demokratikong Pilipino (LDP), which was affiliated with Estrada's Puwersa ng Masa coalition. He won a seat in the Senate, finishing in tenth place.

In late 2006, Lacson said he might run as mayor of the city of Manila in the 2007 midterm elections. However, he rescinded that decision and instead ran for a second Senate term under the Genuine Opposition coalition. He won reelection in the 2007 senatorial elections, ranking third.

On March 11, 2003, Lacson delivered a speech entitled Living Without Pork, exposing the evils and temptations presented by the pork barrel system, and called for its total abolition. During deliberations on the national budget, he stated he would make sure his PDAF allocation reverted to the National Treasury – in the process saving the government some PhP2.4 billion during his first 12 years in the Senate.

Lacson's advocacy against the pork barrel system and the corruption associated with him was cited by the Pamantasan ng Lungsod ng Maynila when it conferred on him the degree of Doctor of Laws, Honoris Causa, on March 27, 2019.

Meanwhile, his alma mater, the Philippine Military Academy, conferred on him on February 19, 2022, the Lifetime Achievement Award citing his more than 50 years of “dedicated, exemplary and unblemished service to the country characterized by his faithful adherence to the virtues of Courage, Loyalty and Integrity.”

Lacson filed bills that aimed to improve public service, enhance reproductive health, promote investments, bolster the country's defense capabilities,

He was one of the main authors of two legislative measures of the Aquino administration, one of which was the Reproductive Health Act. The measure seeks to promote responsible parenthood and to protect the health of the mother and child by giving them access to reproductive health services. President Benigno Aquino III certified the bill as urgent, allowing Congress to pass it quickly. President Aquino signed it into law as Republic Act 10354 in December 2012.

Another legislative measure where Lacson was a main author was the Sin Tax Reform Act, which imposes higher taxes on tobacco and alcohol products to deter the public from buying such products. Those who buy such products will have to pay higher taxes, whose proceeds will go to the government's universal health program.

For the Sin Tax Reform Act, Lacson had filed Senate Bill No. 2763, which sought to restructure the excise tax on alcohol products; and Senate Bill No. 2764, which sought to restructure the excise tax on tobacco products. President Aquino signed the bill into law as Republic Act 10351.

Lacson authored Senate Bill No. 2783, which strengthened further the Anti-Money Laundering Act of 2001. His work is now part of Republic Act No. 10167, which was approved and signed into law on June 18, 2012.

Lacson authored an amendment to the Armed Forces of the Philippines Modernization Act, which aims to provide more funds to the military. President Aquino signed the measure as Republic Act 10349 on December 11, 2012.

Lacson filed Senate Bill No. 2993, An Act Providing for a comprehensive law on firearms, light weapons and ammunitions, which was signed into law as Republic Act 10591.

Lacson authored the law converting Imus, Cavite from a municipality into a city. The measure became Republic Act No. 10161 on May 8, 2012.

Lacson filed Senate Bill No. 2945, which reapportioned the province of Cotabato into three legislative districts. The bill was passed into law as Republic Act 10177.

He filed resolutions that led to many officials being held accountable, whether incumbent or former. Among these were:

- Resolution No. 518: Directing the Blue Ribbon Committee to look into the alleged anomalous acquisition by the Philippine National Police of light operational helicopters in 2009. The resolution triggered an investigation that led to the filing of criminal charges against the officials and personalities linked to the questionable purchase. Some of them were dismissed from the service.
- Resolution No. 519: Directing the Senate Blue Ribbon Committee to look into corruption by the previous board of the Philippine Charity Sweepstakes Office. Many of the officials linked to the irregularity – including former president Gloria Arroyo – have been charged before the graft court.
- Resolution No. 537: Directing the Blue Ribbon Committee to investigate electoral sabotage in the 2004 and 2007 elections, which triggered the charges that led to the arrest and detention of former officials, including former president Gloria Arroyo.

Another resolution, Resolution No. 660, sought congratulate new Cardinal and Manila Archbishop Luis Antonio Tagle.

Lacson filed resolutions commending members of the police and military for safeguarding Filipinos, including:

- Resolution No. 542: Resolution honoring The Outstanding Philippine Soldiers (TOPS) of 2011
- Resolution No. 562: Resolution commending the Country's Outstanding Policemen in Service (COPS) of 2011

As fiscalizer in the Senate, Lacson initiated the investigation of the following:

- IMPSA investigation – 2002
- Jose Pidal investigation – 2003
- Jueteng investigation – 2005
- Textbook Scam investigation – 2006 – 2007
- Flight of Filipino nurses recruited by Sentosa Recruitment Agency – 2007
- Alleged bribery in the failed impeachment bid against President Arroyo – 2007
- Overpricing in the decorative lampposts used in the Asean summit in Cebu City – 2007
- Irregularities in the multibillion-peso Quedancor swine program – 2008
- Plan by the Social Security System to channel workers' pension funds into a government economic stimulus program – 2009
- Alleged irregularities in the purchase of video equipment for the Senate's Public Relations and Information Bureau – 2009

=== 2004 presidential campaign ===
Lacson ran for President in the 2004 general election against the incumbent president, Gloria Macapagal Arroyo. His candidacy stirred disagreements with its party president, Senator Edgardo Angara. The COMELEC decided to follow what was done in the Quirino-Avelino case splitting the certificates of votes into half. Angara appealed the case before the Supreme Court and reversed the COMELEC decision. Lacson resigned from the Laban ng Demokratikong Pilipino (LDP) upon hearing the news.

After resigning from the LDP, Lacson continued campaigning as an independent candidate in the elections. He finished third with 10.88% of the vote, ahead of former senator Raul Roco and Bro. Eddie Villanueva. Lacson would later remark that allegations he was involved in large scale methamphetamine trafficking and kidnap-for-ransom by former PAOCTF agent Mary "Rosebud" Ong in the early 2000's were partly to blame for his failure to win the election, as his positive 73% approval rating in December 2000 had crashed to negative 13% by August 2001.

== Aquino Cabinet (2013–2015) ==
In the aftermath of Super Typhoon Yolanda, that caused widespread destruction, substantial damage and death in several areas in the country, particularly in the Visayas, President Aquino appointed Lacson as Presidential Assistant for Rehabilitation and Recovery (PARR) with the mandate of unifying the efforts of government and other agencies involved in the rehabilitation and recovery efforts. His office crafted the Yolanda Comprehensive Rehabilitation and Recovery Plan (CRRP) with a PhP167 billion proposed funding, which provides for an overall strategic vision and integrated short-term, medium-term and long-term programs in the Yolanda-affected areas. Lacson's efforts in the Yolanda rehabilitation led to the institutionalization of certain mechanisms on rehabilitation of calamity-affected communities.

In December 2014, Lacson tendered his irrevocable resignation as PARR which took effect in February 2015. He recommended the transition of his office's accomplishments and best practices to a permanent government agency. Lacson viewed the scheduled sunset review of Republic Act 10121, otherwise known as "Philippine Disaster Risk Reduction and Management Act of 2010", as an opportune time to propose possible remedial measures that will help improve the effectiveness of the law, especially on the aspect of disaster rehabilitation and recovery.

Lacson pointed out that while his mandate as PARR was to develop a rehabilitation plan, he had no authority to implement or manage funds.

== Senate of the Philippines (2016–2022) ==
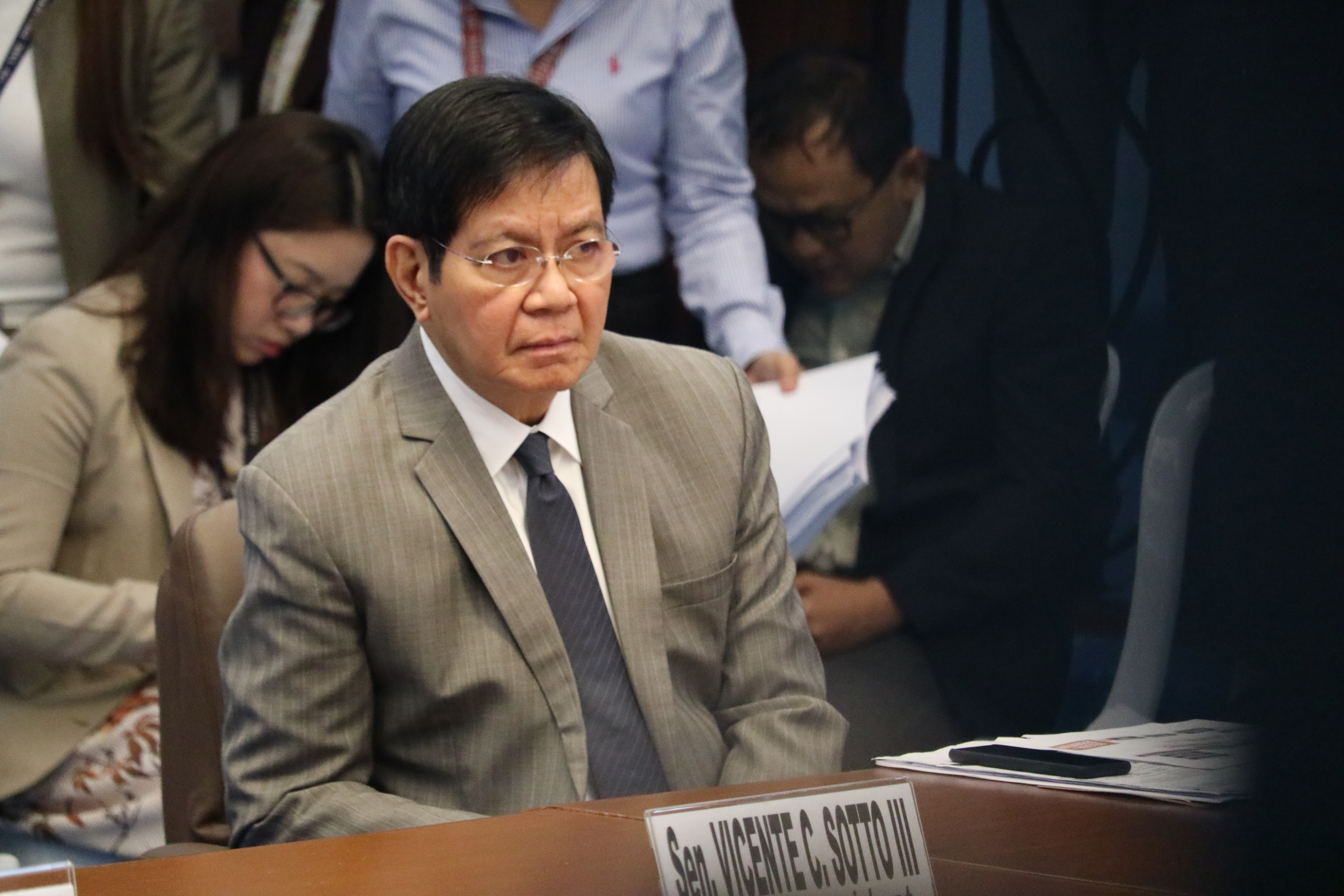
Lacson taking part in a Senate hearing in September 2019

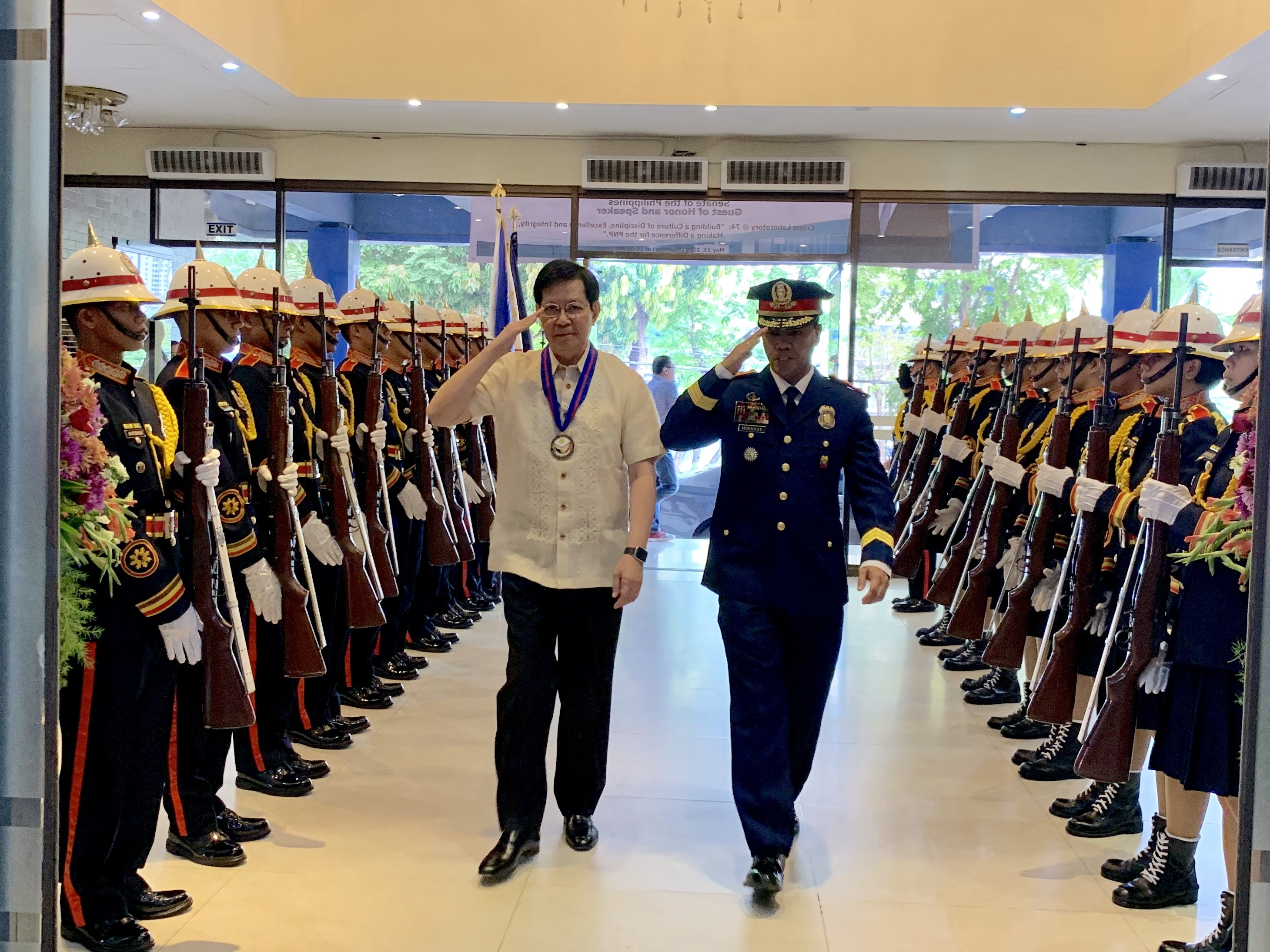
Lacson at Camp Crame in 2019

Lacson originally planned to run for president in the 2016 election. However, due to low ratings in most pre-election presidential surveys, he decided to run for a senate seat as an independent candidate in the 2016 Philippine general election. He was a guest candidate in the senatorial slates of presidential candidates Jejomar Binay (UNA) and Mar Roxas (LP). He was initially listed in Senator Grace Poe's senatorial lineup, but he was eventually replaced by Edu Manzano. He was also listed in Rodrigo Duterte's (PDP–Laban) senatorial slate. However, on February 15, 2016, the Duterte-Cayetano tandem dropped their entire senatorial lineup.

Lacson, who endorsed former Interior Secretary Mar Roxas' presidential campaign, garnered around 17 million votes in the 2016 elections, earning his way to a Senate seat by ranking fourth in terms of total votes.

In the 17th Congress, Lacson filed Senate Bill 41, the National Reference Act of 2016, which seeks to establish a National ID system that can help government law enforcers deter criminality and terrorism by facilitating the processes of apprehension and prosecution. The system seeks to address the problems of constant delays and inconveniences in availing of basic public services and social security benefits due to inefficient and unreliable means of identifying the beneficiaries. The bill was signed into law as RA 11055 in late 2018.

Lacson filed Senate Bill 42, penalizing a wide range of crimes ranging from drug-related offenses to treason, terrorism, and human trafficking.

Lacson filed Senate Bill 48, which seeks to amend Republic Act 4200 to update the list of crimes where wiretapping may be deemed lawful under certain circumstances. The measure may give law enforcers more teeth against crimes like drugs, money-laundering and coups. On October 19, 2016, Lacson sponsored Senate Bill 1210, the proposed Expanded Anti-Wiretapping Act of 2016.

Other bills filed by Lacson include:

- Senate Bill 258, which offers substantial rewards and better protection to witnesses in exchange for coming out and testifying against government officials or employees involved in corruption.
- Senate Bill 1025, which strips drug pushers, manufacturers, cultivators, importers and financiers of their rights under the Bank Secrecy Act, so they can no longer hide their ill-gotten money in banks.

Lacson filed bills to ensure professionalism among law enforcers, including:

- Senate Bills 255 and 266, which provide added benefits to barangay tanods and captains.
- Senate Bill 260, which provides for special financial assistance for families or beneficiaries of police and military personnel, jail officers and firefighters killed or incapacitated in the line of duty.
- Senate Bill 971, which provides guidelines on the selection of provincial commanders and city and town chiefs of police.
- Senate Bill 1052, which seeks to restore subpoena powers to the PNP's CIDG. This was signed into law as RA 10973.
- Senate Bill 1310, which gives the Philippine National Police's Internal Affairs Service more teeth to curb abuses and further enhance discipline in the police agency.

He filed bills seeking to streamline or update the operations of government agencies, including:

- Senate Bill 1470, which updates the charter of the Philippine Charity Sweepstakes Office to help it keep up with new variations of lotteries and make it more accountable.
- Senate Bill 1471, which addresses Pagcor's "conflicting" roles of regulating and operating gambling casinos by having the agency focus on regulating the industry and giving up its role as operator of such establishments.

However, Lacson went after abusive law enforcers, including some rogue cops who took advantage of the government's anti-drug war. At a Senate hearing on January 28, 2017, Lacson showed a video of police officers in civilian clothing, appearing to plant evidence in an anti-drug operation – to stress his call for internal cleansing in the PNP.

In the 18th Congress, Lacson filed Senate Bill 23, the Budget Reform for Village Empowerment Act of 2016. The bill seeks to give local government units an active role in nation building by providing them with funding for development projects.

Lacson re-filed in the 18th Congress his bills on anti-terrorism (Senate Bill 21) and anti-wiretapping (Senate Bill 22). Of the two, the Anti-Terrorism bill became part of the Anti-Terrorism Act of 2020, signed into law by President Rodrigo Duterte on July 3, 2020. Other bills Lacson re-filed included:

- Senate Bill 24, which encourages people's participation in deliberations on the national budget to prevent pork.
- Senate Bill 25, which requires registration of prepaid SIM cards to prevent scams and crimes involving identity theft.
- Senate Bill 26, which excludes government employees, including the President, from protection of the Philippine Bank Secrecy Act.
- Senate Bill 27, which reimposes the death penalty on heinous crimes.
- Senate Bill 28, which imposes heavier penalties on false testimonies.
- Senate Bill 29, which assures that parents who enter their twilight years will get support from their children.
- Senate Bill 30, the proposed Anti-Political Dynasty Act.
- Senate Bill 246, the Real Property Valuation and Assessment Reform Act.
- Senate Bill 247, the Anti-Contraband in Prison Act of 2019.
- Senate Bill 248, Whistleblower Act of 2019.
- Senate Bill 249, The National Defense Act of 2019.
- Senate Bill 250, The Land Administration Reform Act of 2019.
- Senate Bill 251, The Local Government Units' Income Classification Act of 2019.
- Senate Bill 252, Additional Barangay Captains' Insurance Act of 2019.
- Senate Bill 253, Upgrading the Benefits and Incentives of Barangay Tanods.
- Senate Bill 254, An Act Establishing the PAF Academy and Appropriating Funds Therefor.
- Senate Bill 255, Exemptions in Requirements for Conversion of a Municipality into a Component City.

== 2022 presidential campaign ==
On September 8, 2021, Lacson and Tito Sotto launched their bid for president and vice president respectively, for the 2022 Philippine national election. Lacson and Sotto vowed to provide a stronger response to the pandemic, and vowed to restore public trust in the government. Lacson is the first to declare his bid for the presidency.

In late July 2021, Lacson became chairman of Partido Reporma, a political party founded by former Philippine defense secretary Renato de Villa. De Villa was Lacson's former superior in the Philippine Constabulary. This was shortly after Lacson and Sotto announced their plans to officially launch their candidacies for the 2022 Philippine presidential election. Sotto is chairman of the Nationalist People's Coalition. On October 6, 2021, Lacson and Sotto filed their certificates of candidacy for president and vice president respectively with the Comelec.

On February 8, 2022, during his proclamation rally in his hometown of Imus, Cavite, Lacson stressed his platform will be based on uplifting the lives of Filipinos by fixing the ills of government and getting rid of thieves, especially those in the government. Lacson said promoting transparency and stopping corruption will be his priority should he be elected. He said he would do this by enforcing discipline in the bureaucracy. Lacson said he will sign a waiver of his rights to the Bank Secrecy Law and encourage all government officials and employees to do the same. Lacson vowed to undertake a massive internal cleansing of the bureaucracy, going first after those with pending cases involving corruption and negligence.

He stressed as well a "Filipino first" policy, granting incentives to local industries for prioritizing local production and labor. The "Filipino first" policy extends to the agriculture sector and food security to protect Filipino farmers and fishermen. Lacson said it is unacceptable that the Philippines imports galunggong (fish) and vegetables that Filipino farmers are producing.

Due to the ongoing COVID-19 pandemic, Lacson said he and Sotto will maintain a disciplined campaign amid the pandemic, having their organizers and supporters observe health protocols.

On March 24, 2022, after Partido Reporma switched its endorsement to Leni Robredo, he resigned from the party and became an independent candidate.

After his Senate term ended at noon of June 30, 2022, Lacson said he would retire but continue to help in food security through an agri-aqua venture. He said this new chapter in his life involves seeking to boost Philippine agriculture by planting the protein-rich sorghum while engaging in small-scale feed mills, hatcheries and fish cage farming in Mindanao and Luzon. Through this, he said they hope to contribute to help make the Philippines food-sufficient while providing Filipino farmers with additional income outside the traditional rice planting season.

== Senate of the Philippines (from 2025) ==
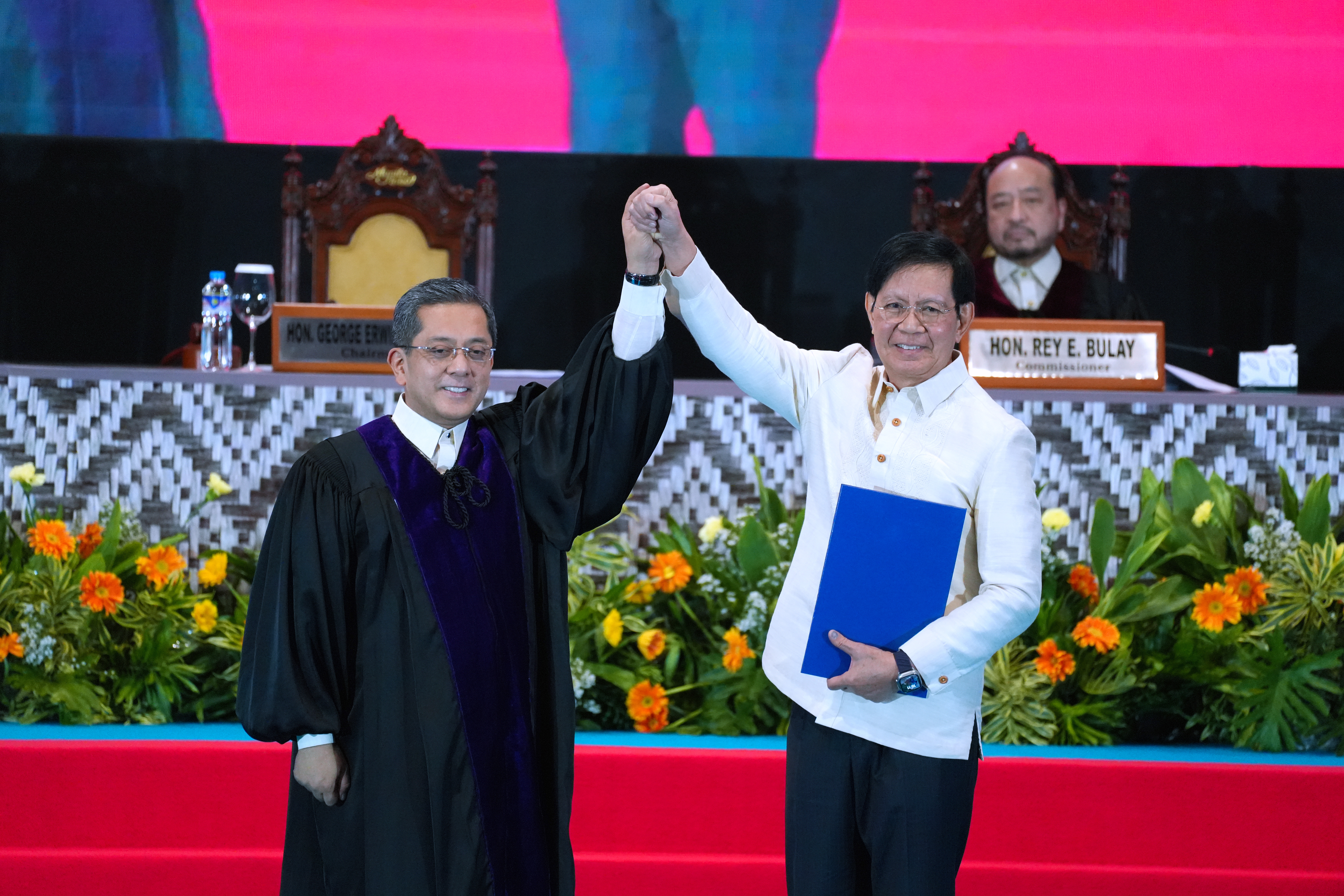
Lacson being proclaimed as a senator-elect on May 17, 2025

Lacson ran for the Senate in the 2025 elections as an independent candidate. He formalized his candidacy by filing his certificate of candidacy before the COMELEC on October 2, 2024. On September 26, 2024, Lacson was endorsed by President Bongbong Marcos at a political event in Pasay. Also endorsed were reelectionist senators Imee Marcos, Pia Cayetano, Lito Lapid, Francis Tolentino and Bong Revilla; former DILG Secretary Benhur Abalos; Makati Mayor Abby Binay; ACT-CIS Representative Erwin Tulfo; Las Piñas Representative Camille Villar; former senators Manny Pacquiao and Tito Sotto. They would all run under the senatorial slate of the Alyansa para sa Bagong Pilipinas

Lacson pointed out that he is running as an independent, not being a member of any political party. In a statement, he said he is a guest candidate of the Nationalist People's Coalition, one of five major political parties in an alliance with the administration Partido Federal ng Pilipinas.

Based on the Comelec's official tally of the senatorial race, Lacson placed seventh with 15.1 million votes and was projected to win a fourth term as senator. Lacson was formally proclaimed by COMELEC Chairman George Garcia as a winning candidate on May 17, 2025, and will return to the Senate on June 30, 2025.

Lacson took his oath of office at the Supreme Court on June 26, four days before his term starts on June 30.

On July 30, Lacson was named as chairman of the Senate Committee on Electoral Reforms and People's Participation. He said he would immediately schedule hearings on a proposed Anti-Political Dynasty Act.

On Aug. 11, 2025, Lacson was named a member of the Senate Committees on Justice and Human Rights, and Higher, Technical and Vocational Education.

On Aug. 19, 2025, Lacson was elected to the Senate Electoral Tribunal. He was also elected as a member of the Senate Committees on Public Works, and Environment, Natural Resources, and Climate Change.

On September 8, 2025, Lacson was elected as the Senate President Pro Tempore as part of a leadership change in the Senate.

On September 23, 2025, Lacson was named the chairman of the Senate accounts committee.

On November 11, 2025, Lacson was reelected as chairman of the Senate Blue Ribbon Committee.

On March 10, 2026, Lacson delivered a high-profile privilege speech detailing how then lawmaker Rodante Marcoleta had self-incriminated through public disclosures regarding undeclared campaign contributions, pointing to potential liabilities for indirect bribery, as well as omissions in his Statements of Assets, Liabilities, and Net Worth and Statements of Contributions and Expenditures. Months later, the Office of the Ombudsman formally filed non-bailable plunder charges and violations of Presidential Decree No. 46 against Marcoleta, leading to his arrest on July 6, 2026, and eventual detention at the Quezon City Jail Male Dormitory in Payatas.

On June 3, 2026, Lacson was elected as chairman of the Senate Public Order and Accounts Committees following a leadership change.

At the special session of the Senate on June 17, 2026, Lacson was elected as chairman of the Committee on Ways and Means.

== Political positions ==
=== Anti-pork advocacy ===
On March 11, 2003, Lacson delivered a privilege speech titled "Living Without Pork," where he began his crusade to abolish the pork barrel system. He pointed out that the pork barrel, no matter its name (Countrywide Development Fund or Priority Development Assistance Fund), is nothing but a “fund of compulsive corruption,” where even infrastructure billboards are overpriced, and legislators who allocate funds for medicines and school supplies get even larger kickbacks. However, even after the Supreme Court declared the pork barrel unconstitutional in 2013, Lacson noted it is still very much alive.

In late 2016, Lacson discovered and moved to take out some P8.3 billion in "pork-like" insertions made by the House of Representatives. Lacson noted that House members were allowed to identify P80 million worth of projects before the submission of the 2017 National Expenditure Program to Congress for deliberations – the pork barrel system already declared unconstitutional by the Supreme Court. This prompted the Senate to realign P8.3 billion in the proposed 2017 national budget to cover tuition of students in state colleges and universities.

For the 2019 budget, Lacson raised questions about the post-ratification tweaks made by the House leadership to the spending bill, saying that this would violate the 1987 Constitution's Art. VI, Sec. 26, Paragraph 2: "Upon the last reading of a bill, no amendment thereto SHALL be allowed." He also noted P72.319 billion was slashed from the DPWH's MFO 1 and 2, which covers the Duterte administration's "Build Build Build" program. The projects under the MFO (Major Final Output) had already been planned and vetted.

Meanwhile, in the proposed 2020 budget, Lacson cited information from some House members regarding a plan to give each district P700 million, and each of 22 deputy Speakers P1.5 billion. The plan was eventually scrapped. Lacson's revelations prompted some House members to demand an apology from Lacson, but Lacson said there is nothing to apologize for, as he is guarding the budget. House members demanded that he named his sources, but Lacson refused, saying that he gets more information because he protects his sources. Lacson said that such complaints will not distract him from scrutinizing the 2020 budget bill.

=== Failed and Ghost Flood Control Projects ===
On July 25, 2025, Lacson posted on X that while the Department of Public Works and Highways (DPWH) has spent an estimated P2 trillion for flood management for the past 15 years – or P350 million a day, the flooding problem still persists. He added half of the P2 trillion may have been lost to corruption. Lacson called for a long-term, integrated master planning for flood control, as well as certainty of punishment against those involved in the botched flood control programs.

On August 20, 2025, Lacson delivered a privilege speech titled "Flooded Gates of Corruption," where he detailed the greed behind the corruption that led to substandard, failed and ghost flood control projects in several parts of the country, and called for "greed control" to address the problem.

In his privilege speech, Lacson detailed various bribes that deducted from a project's costs, with only 40 percent of the cost actually going to the project - thus forcing contractors to use substandard materials or work. He tagged Bulacan as one of the most notorious areas where such flood control projects are located. Politicians get a lion's share of the kickbacks from such projects in collusion with contractors and corrupt public works officials, he added. At least one member of the House of Representatives, Oriental Mindoro's 1st congressional district Rep. Arnan Panaligan, figured in Lacson's privilege speech. Panaligan denied involvement in the questionable flood projects.

=== Capital punishment ===
Lacson had been pushing for the restoration of the death penalty, filing a bill seeking to "re-impose the death penalty on certain heinous crimes" in 2019. After he entered the presidential race in the upcoming 2022 presidential election, however, he reversed his decision on the issue after watching the film The Life of David Gale. As a presidential aspirant, Lacson vowed to retract the death penalty bill he filed before the Senate "if it's still there", arguing that "it is more important to save the life of someone innocent and convicted than to execute someone who is really convicted and proven to have committed a crime".

=== Exposing "Tara (payoffs)" system at the Bureau of Customs ===
On August 23, 2017, Lacson delivered a privilege speech at the Senate, where he narrated details of corruption at the Bureau of Customs. This led to former Customs Commissioner Nicanor Faeldon being cited for contempt by the Senate Blue Ribbon Committee after he refused to testify in the probe on illegal drugs.

On September 28, Lacson filed charges against Faeldon and several others before the Office of the Ombudsman over rice smuggling in March 2017.

=== Detailing "Conflict of Interest" at the DOH, PhilHealth ===
In a privilege speech on July 29, 2019, Lacson detailed how the Philippine Health Insurance Corp. (PhilHealth) was spending beyond its means while its higher-ups "seem to turn a blind eye." He said this was due partly to the new reimbursement rates where PhilHealth "pays per case and not by actual expenses."

Lacson also bared WellMed, a company suspended for making fake benefit claims, was still receiving payments from PhilHealth.

Also, Lacson said the family of Health Secretary and ex-officio PhilHealth chairman Francisco Duque III had entered into a lease agreement with PhilHealth's Region 1 office where the agency rented the building owned by the Duque family's EMDC in Dagupan City. Lacson said a General Information Sheet of EMDC showed Secretary Duque was among the stockholders of the company, thus indicating a conflict of interest.

In addition, Lacson said Doctors Pharmaceuticals Inc., a company owned by Secretary Duque's relatives, bids for government contracts with the DOH. The company was found in 2015 by the Food and Drug Administration to have manufactured for other companies, and was given a cease-and-desist order in June 2015. The FDA also ordered the recall of all drug products, but a tip that prompted an FDA inspection showed the firm was still operating. The FDA also found non-conformance with Good Manufacturing Practice.

The revelations triggered separate investigations by Malacanang and the Senate. Malacanang said that while Secretary Duque, who denied the allegations, still enjoys President Rodrigo Duterte's trust, it will not stop him from attending the congressional investigations.

=== "Designated Survivor" Bill to ensure the order of presidential succession ===
On August 28, 2019, Lacson filed Senate Bill 982, an "Act Prescribing the Order of Presidential Succession." The bill was also known as the "Designated Survivor" bill due to its similarity to the US and Korean shows that featured a designated official being kept in a safe, remote area to act as president should the President and his/her successors be killed or incapacitated in a terrorist attack or major calamity. Lacson confirmed he drew inspiration from the Netflix show.

=== Proposed Philippine Building Act ===
In the wake of recent quakes that hit Mindanao, Lacson filed Senate Bill 1239, updating the 1977 National Building Code. "Experience tells us that there is an urgent need to strengthen the overall policy on how buildings and structures are built in the country. Not to mention the country's geographical location along the boundary of major tectonic plates and at the center of the typhoon belt, coupled by its socially and economically vulnerable population, it becomes even more imperative to review our four-decade-old National Building Code," Lacson said.

=== R&D advocacy ===
Lacson pushed for bigger state investments in research and development, which he noted accounts for only 0.4 percent of the national budget from 2016 to 2020. To remedy this, he proposed increases in the R&D budget of the Department of Science and Technology, including a P250M increase for the Office of the Secretary; P50M increase for the Science for Change Program: Niche Center in the Regions for Research and Development (NICER); P100M for the Space Technology and Applications Mastery, Innovation and Advancement (STAMINA4Space); and P100M for the Collaborative Research and Development to Leverage Philippine Economy (CRADLE) program.

He reiterated the importance of research and development in March 2020, amid government preparations to deal with the COVID-19 threat.

Lacson vowed a "historic increase" of budget infusion for research and development efforts should he be elected president.

=== Anti-Terrorism Law ===
Lacson is one of the authors and the sponsor in the Senate of what is now Republic Act 11479, the Anti-Terrorism Act of 2020, signed into law by President Rodrigo Duterte on July 3, 2020. The law replaces the Human Security Act of 2007 (RA 9372), which he noted became a dead-letter law as some of its provisions – including a P500,000 daily penalty for the wrongful detention of a suspected terrorist – discouraged law enforcers from using it to charge suspected terrorists. In more than 10 years in effect, the 2007 law resulted in just one conviction and just one proscribed terrorist organization such as the Abu Sayyaf Group, he added.

The Anti-Terrorism Act of 2020 fills the gaps in the 2007 law by making punishable inchoate offenses – Section 6 penalizes planning, training, preparing and facilitating the commission of terrorism – as well as providing the mechanism allowing the freezing of assets used to finance terrorism, but does not cover protests, mass actions and other actions covered in the Bill of Rights in the 1987 Constitution.

In addressing claims the law could allow abuse, Lacson said there are safeguards such as 10-year jail terms and perpetual disqualification from public office for law enforcers who fail to comply with the requirement to report the arrest of a suspected terrorist to the nearest court and to the Commission on Human Rights. As such, he pointed out the law is "swift, effective and constitutional".

== Legislative record ==
=== Free irrigation law for farmers (Republic Act No. 10969) ===
Shortly after assuming his Senate post in 2016, Lacson filed a bill providing free irrigation for farmers. The bill was consolidated in Senate Bill 1465, which along with House Bill 5670 were the basis for Republic Act 10969 – the Free Irrigation Service Act – which President Rodrigo Duterte signed into law on February 2, 2018.

=== Anti-hazing law (Republic Act No. 11053) ===
Lacson chaired a Senate committee investigation into the fatal hazing of law student Horacio "Atio" Castillo III in September 2017. The probe found indications of a cover-up attempt via Facebook chat by Aegis Jvris fraternity, the organization Castillo sought to join. The probe resulted in Senate Bill 1662, which updated the existing Anti-Hazing Act of 1995 by imposing heavier penalties on hazing. The bill passed third and final reading in the Senate on February 12, 2018. It also passed the bicameral conference committee on February 28, 2018. The bill finally became a law after President Rodrigo Duterte signed it on June 29, 2018.

Under the new law, the definition of hazing was expanded to include "physical or psychological suffering, harm or injury inflicted on a recruit, member, neophyte, or applicant" as a prerequisite for admission or for continued membership in an organization. Banned under the law are "all forms of hazing" not only in fraternities, sororities or organizations in schools, but also those in communities and even businesses and uniformed service learning institutions.

The law also requires schools to be "more active and proactive" in regulating school-based initiation rites, with schools required to exercise reasonable supervision and take proactive steps to protect students from danger of participating in activities that will involve hazing. Penalties include imprisonment of up to 40 years and fines of up to PHP3 million.

=== Anti-crime laws ===
Lacson filed several anti-crime bills that were passed into law, including:

- Amendment to the Anti-Money Laundering Act to include casinos as covered persons. It was signed into law as Republic Act 10927. Lacson also primarily authored Republic Act 9194, the Anti-Money Laundering Act.
- Restoration of subpoena powers to the PNP-CIDG. The bill was signed into law as Republic Act 10973.
- A retirement and benefits system for the Office of the Ombudsman, which is part of what is now Republic Act 11059.
- Transferring the training of police recruits to the PNP, signed into law as Republic Act 11279.

=== National ID law (Republic Act No. 11055) ===
Lacson sponsored the bill seeking to establish a National ID system in the Philippines. In his sponsorship speech, Lacson said the National ID system seeks to harmonize, integrate and interconnect the "countless and redundant" government-issued ID cards. The proposed measure – Senate Bill 1738 – was approved in the Senate with a vote of 17–2 on March 19, 2018.

On August 6, 2018, President Rodrigo Duterte signed the National ID measure into law, as Republic Act 11055. Lacson, the principal sponsor of the measure and a perennial author since 2001, expressed thanks to Duterte, as it was under his term that the national ID system saw the light of day.

=== PNP rank classification law (Republic Act 11200) ===
On February 8, 2019, President Rodrigo Duterte signed into law Republic Act 11200, which provides for a rank classification in the Philippine National Police. Lacson said the new law, where he is the principal author and sponsor, eliminates confusion on how PNP officers must be addressed, but more importantly, "allows for better coordination between the PNP and other law enforcement units in countering terrorism and other threats to national security." He added: "We cannot afford any delay in coordination in counter-terrorism operations and operations against other threats to national security."

Under the new law, the PNP's rank classification shall be as follows:

- Director-General to Police General
- Deputy Director-General to Police Lieutenant General
- Director to Police Major General
- Chief Superintendent to Police Brigadier General
- Senior Superintendent to Police Colonel
- Superintendent to Police Lieutenant Colonel
- Chief Inspector to Police Major
- Senior Inspector to Police Captain
- Inspector to Police Lieutenant
- SPO4 to Police Executive Master Sergeant
- SPO3 to Police Chief Master Sergeant
- SPO2 to Police Senior Master Sergeant
- SPO1 to Police Master Sergeant
- PO3 to Police Staff Sergeant
- PO2 to Police Corporal
- PO1 to Patrolman/Patrolwoman

=== Anti-Terrorism Act of 2020 (Republic Act No. 11479) ===
Lacson sponsored in the Senate what is now the Anti-Terrorism Act of 2020 (Republic Act No. 11479). In his sponsorship speech for the measure in October 2019, Lacson said the country needs "a legal framework for anti-terrorism that is clear, concise, balanced, and rational." He added the 2007 Human Security Act – which the 2020 anti-terror law replaced – had become a dead-letter law, with only one conviction in the more than 10 years it was in effect.

Also, Lacson pointed out the Anti-Terrorism Act of 2020 fills the gaps in the 2007 law by making punishable inchoate offenses – Section 6 penalizes planning, training, preparing and facilitating the commission of terrorism – as well as providing the mechanism allowing the freezing of assets used to finance terrorism.

However, he stressed the law is not meant to stifle dissent as claimed by some groups, as Section 4 makes clear it does not cover advocacy, protest, dissent, stoppage of work, industrial or mass action, and other similar exercises of civil and political rights that are not intended to cause death or serious physical harm to a person, to endanger a person's life, or to create a serious risk to public safety. Lacson said he is ready to closely monitor and call out potential abuses in the implementation of the law, adding he will not allow anyone to pervert the legislative intent of the measure that he had painstakingly sponsored on the Senate floor.

He noted the bill had gone through the gauntlet in the legislative branch, with its provisions earning the nod of constitutionalists and legal heavyweights in both houses of Congress.

On September 2, 2022, Lacson reiterated that the CPP-NPA-NDF, which was designated not only by the government of the Republic of the Philippines but also by the European Union, the United States of America and four other countries (Canada, United Kingdom, Australia, New Zealand) — "is unequivocally an enemy of the state." He also scored suggestions to amend the Anti-Terrorism Act, saying this would be "a disrespect to our comrades-in-arms as well as the countless civilians who fell victims to the atrocities of this terrorist group that has lost its ideological principles over the years – they murder, they rob, they extort, they harass and intimidate and worse, indiscriminately."

=== Easing conversion of municipalities into cities (Republic Act 11683) ===
Lacson filed Senate Bill 255 in July 2019, seeking to ease the requirements for municipalities to become cities. The measure lapsed into law in April 2022 as Republic Act 11683. The law amends Section 450 of RA 7160 or the Local Government Code of 1991, exempting a municipality from the land and population requirements if it generates at least P100 million for two consecutive years.

=== Ending the revolving-door policy in the AFP (Republic Act 11705) ===
Lacson co-authored and sponsored Senate Bill 2376, which President Rodrigo Duterte signed into law as Republic Act 11709. The law provides fixed terms for the AFP Chief of Staff and other senior officers, among others, to ensure professionalism in the institution. Lacson was the principal author and sponsor of Senate Bill 2869 in the 15th Congress, which also sought to provide fixed terms for the AFP's chief of staff and major service commanders. However, it was vetoed by then President Benigno Aquino III at the time.

"Finally, we will see an end to the revolving-door policy in the AFP. The leaders of our AFP will have the opportunity to implement their legacy programs instead of staying in office too briefly," said Lacson, adding that "(t)he revolving-door policy has always been a disservice to the mandates of the military leadership entrusted with the security and defense of the country."

== Personal life ==
Lacson is married to Alice de Perio, and he has four children, including his son Panfilo "Pampi" Lacson Jr., who has a son with actress and former wife Jodi Sta. Maria, and a daughter with model Iwa Moto. Lacson resides in Ayala Alabang, Muntinlupa.

His law enforcement career inspired two action films: Task Force Habagat (1993) and Ping Lacson: Super Cop (2000). He was portrayed by action star Rudy Fernandez.

Another film, 10,000 Hours (2013), was based on Lacson's flight in 2010. It starred Robin Padilla, who was elected senator in 2022.

== Electoral history ==
Electoral history of Panfilo Lacson
| Year | Office | Party | Votes received | | | | Result |
| Year | Office | Party | Total | % | P. | Swing | Result |
|---|---|---|---|---|---|---|---|
| 2001 | Senator of the Philippines | LDP | 10,535,559 | 35.74% | 10th | —N/a | Won |
| 2007 | Senator of the Philippines | UNO | 15,509,188 | 52.58% | 3rd | +16.84 | Won |
| 2016 | Senator of the Philippines | IND | 16,926,152 | 37.63% | 4th | -14.95 | Won |
| 2025 | Senator of the Philippines | IND | 15,106,111 | 26.34% | 7th | -11.29 | Won |
| 2004 | President of the Philippines | LDP | 3,510,080 | 10.88% | 3rd | —N/a | Lost |
| 2022 | President of the Philippines | IND | 892,375 | 1.66% | 5th | -9.22 | Lost |

== Notes ==
Police appointments
| Preceded by Edmundo Larroza (OIC) | Chief of the Philippine National Police | Succeeded by Leandro Mendoza |
Political offices
| New office | Presidential Assistant for Rehabilitation and Recovery; 2013–2015 | Position abolished |
Party political offices
| Vacant Title last held by Ramon Mitra Jr. | LDP nominee for President of the Philippines | Most recent |
| Vacant Title last held by Renato de Villa | Partido Reporma nominee for President of the Philippines | Most recent |
