= Kuratong Baleleng =

Philippine organized crime syndicate

- Founded: 1986
- Years active: 1986–unknown
- Territory: Philippines
- Activities: Contract killing, prostitution, fraud, drug trafficking, extortion, weapon trafficking, armed robbery, kidnapping, human trafficking and illegal gambling

Kuratong Baleleng is an organized crime syndicate in the Philippines that was once an anti-communist, vigilante group. Considered to be one of the largest syndicates in the country, Kuratong Baleleng received nationwide attention due to their alleged end in a shootout with the Philippine National Police in May 1995 in Quezon City. Since then, the syndicate has scattered throughout different provinces, with some members garnering political positions.

== History ==
The group was originally established in 1986 by the Botanical Youth Club to prevent the spread of Communist guerrillas in Misamis Occidental, Zamboanga del Norte, and Zamboanga del Sur provinces on Mindanao. The group is rooted in the Christian Cebuano community, but ties to the Maguindanao guerrillas led Muslim Maguindanaon clans to join. According to military intelligence, part of the group's strength is protection from both local and national government officials.

Its first leader was Octavio "Ongkoy" Parojinog, handpicked by the Armed Forces of the Philippines. He allegedly began using the group both for its officially stated purpose as well as to conduct illegal activities. While effective in driving out most of the insurgents from these three provinces, they engaged in illegal activities during peacetime even though the military ordered them to disband. The syndicate has since been involved in kidnapping, robberies, drug trafficking, and other crimes, eventually splintering into many smaller groups around the region. Their activities expanded to include smuggling, kidnapping, murder, extortion, and illegal gambling.

=== 1995 PACC murder case ===
In 1995, 11 members of Kuratong Baleleng were killed by the forces of the Presidential Anti-Crime Commission, then led by Panfilo Lacson. Officers were prosecuted with the Free Legal Assistance Group (FLAG), the largest human rights law firm, serving as the chief prosecutor in the case. In 2003, the High Tribunal remanded the Quezon City Regional Trial Court to once again indict Lacson and 33 other police officials. The trial court dismissed the criminal case for lack of probable cause. The special prosecuting team of FLAG led by Jose Manuel Chel Diokno, responded and later asked the High Tribunal to remand the case once more to the trial court to present new evidence against Lacson, inter alia. On May 2, 2008, the Supreme Court of the Philippines approved Diokno's appeal, thereby reopening the case to prosecute implicated officers.

=== Modern day ===
The death of Ongkoy did not spell the end of the group. The lawmen responsible for his death, save for leader Colonel Gadapan, were murdered one by one. Remnants of the Kuratong Baleleng have spread out throughout Mindanao, Manila and Cebu. In April 2014, long-time Kuratong Baleleng fugitive Edgar Digamo was shot and killed by police after he began shooting at them in Lapu-Lapu City, after hiding for 13 years.

Operations set during the Philippine drug war had severely weakened the Kuratong Baleleng. Most of the Parojinogs were either killed or captured, starting with the 2017 Ozamiz Raid. In 2018, gang leaders Manuelito Estomata Francisco, Rizalina Francisco, and June Ozamiz Francisco, were captured by the Police Regional Office 1. Efforts to revive the gang in Zamboanga del Sur were uncovered and halted, with then-President Rodrigo Duterte proclaiming, "There are police there in Zamboanga del Sur sort of reviving the Kuratong Baleleng...better shape up."

== In popular culture ==
Jinggoy Estrada starred in the 1995 film Wilson Sorronda Leader Kuratong Baleleng's Solid Group, depicting the life of soldier-turned Kuratong Baleleng leader Wilson Sorronda, and the events that led to the 1995 encounter that ended the group's criminal activities.

In 2000, Rudy Fernandez topbilled a movie depicting Panfilo Lacson's biography titled Ping Lacson: Super Cop with an intro depicting the rubout between PACC and Kuratong Baleleng.

In early 2014, the film Sa Ngalan ng Ama, Ina, at mga Anak, starring actor Robin Padilla, was released.

The feature film Bamboo Dogs (2018) by Khavn De La Cruz is based on the Kuratong Baleleng massacre of 1995.
