= Highway Patrol Group =

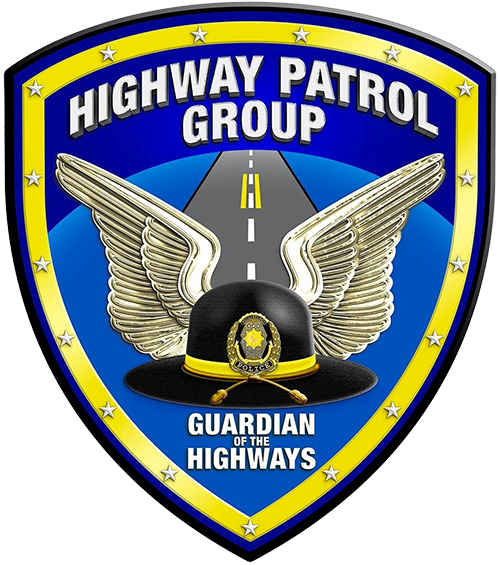
- Abbreviation: HPG
- Motto: "Guardians of the Highway"

Agency overview
- Formed: 1955
- Preceding agencies: Traffic Management Command (until 1997); Traffic Management Group (1997–2008)

Jurisdictional structure
- National agency: Philippines
- Operations jurisdiction: Philippines
- General nature: Civilian police

Operational structure
- Headquarters: Manila
- Agency executive: see list
- Parent agency: Philippine National Police

The Highway Patrol Group is a police unit under the Philippine National Police (PNP) who supervises traffic-related crimes and its management.

== History ==
The Highway Patrol Group was established as Traffic Control Group (Trafcon) in 1955 as a response to a high-profile vehicular accident along a highway in Pampanga, now known as the MacArthur Highway. The accident which occurred on November 4, 1954, which killed House of Representatives members Gregorio Tan of Samar and Lorenzo Ziga of Albay. President Ramon Magsaysay urged Congress to establish a "specialized and dedicated" police unit to maintain road traffic safety across the Philippines.

The Trafcon was a unit under the Philippine Constabulary, which in turn was part of the Armed Forces of the Philippines. The Trafcon later became known as the Constabulary Highway Patrol Group. The HPG was absorbed in 1991 when the Philippine National Police was formed through the merger of the Constabulary and the Integrated National Police. The HPG became the Traffic Management Group. However the traffic law enforcement powers of the patrol group was given to the Metropolitan Manila Development Authority (MMDA) and local government units (LGUs) some years later. In May 2008, TMG became Highway Patrol Group due to Napolcom Resolution No. 2008-262.

The Highway Patrol Group returned to EDSA in 2015 and was tasked to enforce traffic laws due to worsening traffic conditions in the Metro Manila thoroughfare at the time. This is to augment MMDA traffic constables and LGU enforcers. The HPG last patrolled EDSA in 1994.

== Organization ==
As the Traffic Control Group (Trafcon), the unit was under the Philippine Constabulary. It later became part of the Philippine National Police. The HPG has Regional Highway Patrol Units under it.

== Role ==
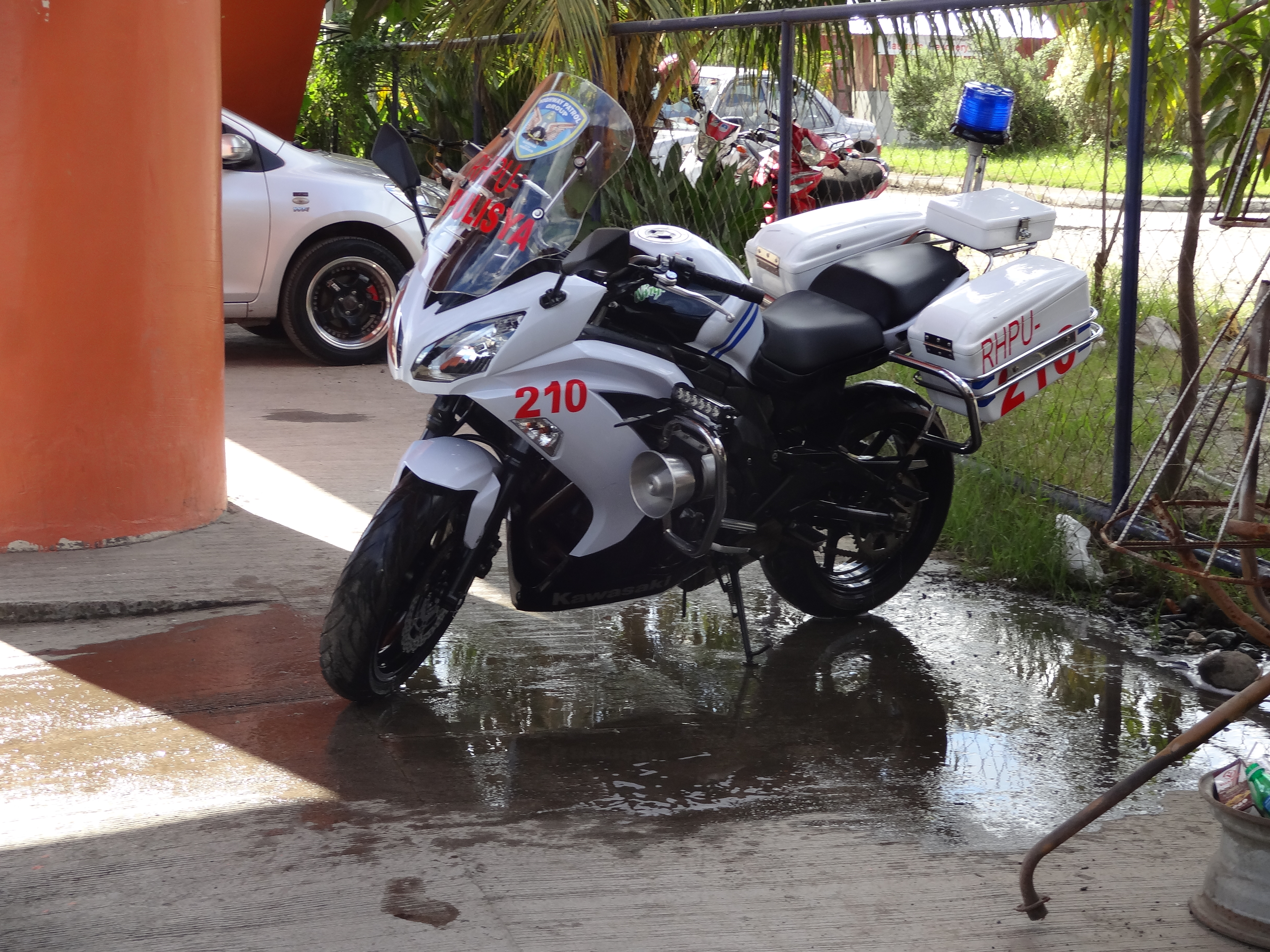
Highway Patrol Group's Kawasaki Ninja 650R No. 210

The Highway Patrol Group is a highway patrol with a national scope. It is tasked to enforce traffic safety roles and provides general supervision to local police forces with regard to the enforcement of traffic laws. It also provides assistance to the Land Transportation Office, formerly the Bureau of Land Transportation. The HPG furthermore also enforces driver's licenses and motor vehicle registration and regulations with regards to public carriers.

== Directors ==
No.	Name	Term	Ref.
1.	PCOL Mariano C Azurin	06 December 1954 - 22 February 1957	
2.	PCOL Amadeo D Garcia, Sr.	02 May 1957 - 11 May 1957	
3.	PCOL Jose R Regala	12 June 1962 - 15 September 1965	
4.	PCOL Jaime A Catral	01 October 1968 - 31 December 1970	
5.	LTC Amante S Bueno	27 May 1973 - 05 July 1973	
6.	PBGEN Antonio P Abaya	03 July 1973 - 30 October 1979	
7.	PBGEN Jose V Sembrano	30 October 1979 - 30 October 1981	
8.	PBGEN Protacio A Larroya	26 April 1983 - 07 April 1986	
9.	PBGEN Benjamin Z Dizon	07 April 1986 - 24 March 1988	
10.	PBGEN Manuel F Bruan	24 March 1988 - 09 April 1990	
11.	PBGEN Wilfredo D Cruz	09 April 1990 - 01 January 1991	
12.	PBGEN Norberto M Lina	01 January 1991 - 21 March 1991	
13.	PCSUPT Jose Percival Adiong	21 March 1991 - 21 July 1992	
14.	PCSUPT Renato Motus	21 July 1992 - 23 May 1993	
15.	PCSUPT Miguel G Coronel	23 May 1993 - 17 July 1994	
16.	PSSUPT Francisco Zubia, Jr.	17 July 1994 - 01 June 1995	
17.	PSSUPT Florencio D Fianza	19 June 1995 - 08 January 1996	
18.	PCSUT Romeo B Maganto	08 January 1996 - 21 May 1996	
19.	PSSUPT Norberto Manaog	22 May 1996 - 16 August 1997	
24.	PCSUPT Renato Paredes	31 July 2000 - 01 August 2002	
	PCSUPT Danilo P Mangila	01 August 2002 - 17 November 2004	
	PCSUPT Ricardo C Quinto	17 November 2004 - 18 October 2005	
	PCSUPT Orlando M. Mabutas	22 December 2008 - 02 July 2010	
	PCSUPT Leonardo P Espina	02 July 2010 - 06 September 2012	
	PCSUPT Arazzad P Subong	12 September 2012 - 20 April 2015	
	PCSUPT Arnold D Gunnacao	20 April 2015 - 01 July 2016	
	PCSUPT Antonio N Gardiola, Jr.	01 July 2016 – 10 July 2017	
	PCSUPT Arnel B Escobal	10 July 2017 - 01 June 2018	
	PCSUPT Roberto B Fajardo	June 4, 2018 – August 15, 2019	
	PBGEN Dionardo Carlos	October 21, 2019 – January 19, 2020	
	PBGEN Eliseo dela Cruz	January 19, 2020 – October 6, 2020	
	PBGEN Alexander Tagum	October 6, 2020 – November 5, 2021	
	PBGEN Gregory Bogñalbal	November 5, 2021 – November 15, 2021	
	PBGEN Rommel Francisco D. Marbil	November 15, 2021 – August 8, 2022	
	PBGEN Clifford Gairanod	August 8, 2022 – April 4, 2023	
	PBGEN Raul Bargamento	April 4, 2023 – June 23, 2023	
	PBGEN Allan Nazzaro	June 26, 2023 – May 15, 2024	
	PBGEN Jay Cumigad	May 15, 2024 – October 8, 2024	
	PBGEN William Segun	October 8, 2024 – January 11, 2025	
	PBGEN Eleazar Matta	January 11, 2025 – 03 July 2025	
