= Criminal Investigation and Detection Group =

Investigation arm of the Philippine National Police

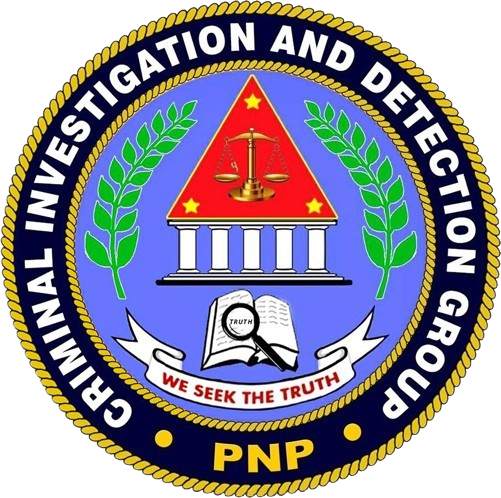
- Seal of the CIDG
- Abbreviation: CIDG
- Motto: "We Seek the Truth"

Agency overview
- Formed: 1953; 73 years ago
- Preceding agencies: Criminal Information Service, Philippine Constabulary; Criminal Investigation Service Command (until 1993); Criminal Investigation Service (until 1999)

Jurisdictional structure
- Operations jurisdiction: Philippines

Operational structure
- Agency executives: PMGEN Robert Alexander A. Morico II, Director; PCOL Santiago D. Pascual III, Deputy Director for Administration; PCOL Ranie P. Hachuela, Deputy Director for Operations; PCOL Reynaldo L. Lizardo, Chief of Staff
- Parent agency: Philippine National Police

Website
- cidg.pnp.gov.ph

The Criminal Investigation and Detection Group (CIDG) is the primary investigation arm of the Philippine National Police (PNP).

== History ==
The Criminal Investigation and Detection Group was established as the Criminal Information Service whose origin traces back as early as 1901 shortly after the establishment of the Philippine Constabulary when the Information Section was established as mandated by the Section 2, Article 255 of the Philippine Commission. In 1920 the Information Division was integrated with the United States Army Forces in the Far East and its detectives participated at the Battle of Bataan, many of which also were forced to participate at the Bataan Death March.

After World War II, the Military Police Command was activated in lieu of the Philippine Constabulary. A Criminal Investigation Branch of the G2 to investigate crimes and maintain peace and order. This division remain operational after the independence of the Philippines from the United States on July 4, 1946.

In 1953, the Philippine Constabulary was integrated to the Armed Forces of the Philippines and a Police Affairs Division was created. A Criminal Laboratory was made by the division to support constabulary units with background in scientific criminology. On January 19, 1953, the General Headquarters of the Armed Forces issued General Order Nr. 14 which resulted to the reorganization of the defunct Philippine Constabulary into two main components, a general staff unit, called the Intelligence Division or C2, and an operating special staff unit, the Criminal Investigation Service (CIS).

On October 28, 1955, a Police Intelligence Branch was created by the CIS and in 1958 the investigation body was elevated to a division. The CIS, adopted Criminal Investigation Office as its new name on October 5, 1960, but reverted to its old name two months later. It was again renamed to Criminal Investigation Service Command (CISC) in 1989 and to its present name in 1999.

== Units ==
Under the Director, it has three (3) deputies:

- Deputy Director for Administration,
- Deputy Director for Operation, and
- Chief of Staff

It also has divisions such as:

- Administrative and Record Management Division,
- Investigation Division,
- Operation Management Division, and
- Intelligence Division

The group also has:

- Legal officer,
- Police-community relations officers,
- Public information office,
- Secretary to Division Staff,
- DLOS,
- Personnel Record Management Section,
- Budget & Finance,
- HRDDS,
- GPSMU,
- Station Health Unit,
- Logistic Section,
- Case Referral Monitoring Center,
- Technical Support Section,
- GESPO, and
- Office of the Supervisor for Non-Uniformed Personnel

The CIDG also has the following operational units:

- Anti-Fraud Commercial Crime Unit,
- Anti-Organized Crime Unit,
- Anti-Trans National Crime Unit,
- General Services Division,
- Acting Chief, Major Crimes Investigation Unit,
- Women and Children Complaint Unit, and
- Detective and Special Operation Unit.

Its regional units (RFUs = Regional Force Units) are:

- CIDG NCR
- CIDG RFU 1
- CIDG RFU 2
- CIDG RFU 3
- CIDG RFU 4A
- CIDG RFU 4B
- CIDG RFU 5
- CIDG RFU 6
- CIDG RFU 7
- CIDG RFU 8
- CIDG RFU 9
- CIDG RFU 10
- CIDG RFU 11
- CIDG RFU 12
- CIDG RFU 13
- CIDG RFU 14 (Bangsamoro)
- CIDG RFU 15 (Cordillera)

== List of directors ==
Name	Term	Ref.
Col. Hospicio Cortes	January 19, 1953 – 1954	
Col. Delfin Dela Cruz	1954–1955	
BGen. Ramon Gelvezon	September 1, 1955 – February 2, 1959	
Maj. Constantino G. Navarro	February 4 – May 13, 1959	
Maj. Benjamin Santiago	May 14, 1959 – January 1, 1960	
Lt. Col. Daniel Iway	February 2, 1960 – November 30, 1961	
Col. Safio Bayron	December 1, 1961 – January 9, 1962	
Col. Jose Maristela	January 10, 1962 – August 22, 1963	
Col. Francisco Jimenez	August 23, 1963 – September 2, 1963	
Col. Gaudencio Gardi	September 3, 1963 to June 3, 1964	
Col. Benjamin Tolentino	January 2, 1965 – January 1, 1966	
Col. Robustiano C. Javier	February 11, 1966 – May 12, 1966	
Col. Felizardo R. Tanabe	March 18, 1966 – September 21, 1967	
Col. Simplicio Belisario	September 22, 1967 – November 16, 1967	
BGen. Pacencio S. Magtibay	November 16, 1967 – January 31, 1968	
BGen. Cesar M. Garcia	February 1, 1968 – June 4, 1968	
Col. Rafael M. Dumalo Jr.	June 5, 1968 – December 15, 1968	
Col. Palayo C. Perez	June 19, 1969 – June 15, 1970	
BGen. Prospero Olivas	December 16, 1970 – November 10, 1973	
BGen. Antonio P. Uy	November 11, 1973 – August 3, 1981	
BGen. Hermogenes Peralta Jr.	September 1, 1981 – April 15, 1985	
BGen. Romeo R. Zulueta	April 16, 1985 – March 24, 1988	
BGen. Evaristo G. Cariño	March 25, 1988 – April 15, 1989	
BGen. Pantaleon G. Dumalo	April 16, 1989 – February 8, 1991	
P/CSUPT Vicente G. Vinarao	February 9, 1991 – August 19, 1992	
P/CSUPT Angel H. Quizon	March 4, 1993 – February 7, 1994	
P/CSUPT Romeo M. Acop	February 22, 1994 – June 19, 1995	
P/CSUPT Ramsey Ocampo	June 20, 1995 – June 15, 1996	
P/CSUPT Efren Q. Fernandez	June 16, 1996 – August 24, 1998	
P/CSUPT Lucas M. Managuelod	August 25, 1998 – 2000	
P/CSUPT Francisco Zubia	2000 – 2001	
P/DIR Nestorio Gualberto	2001 – September 14, 2002	
P/CSUPT Eduardo Matillano	September 14, 2002 – 2003	
P/DIR Arturo Lomibao	2003 – 2004	
P/DIR Jesus Verzosa	September 12, 2004 – 2006	
P/DIR Edgardo M. Doromal	2006 – 2008	
P/DIR Raul Castañeda	2008 – 2010	
P/DIR Leon Nilo dela Cruz	2010 – April 7, 2011	
P/DIR Samuel D. Pagdilao	2011 – February 14, 2013	
P/DIR Francisco A. Uyami Jr.	February 14, 2013 – December 7, 2013	
P/DIR Benjamin Magalong	December 7, 2013 – July 11, 2015	
P/CSUPT Victor P. Deona	July 11, 2015 – July 2016	
P/DIR Roel Barcena Obusan	July 2016 – November 19, 2018	
PMGen. Amador V. Corpus	November 18, 2018 – October 21, 2019	
PMGen. Joel Coronel	October 21, 2019 – January 30, 2021	
PMGen. Albert Ignatius Ferro	January 30, 2021 – March 5, 2022	
PMGen. Eliseo DC Cruz	March 5, 2022 – August 2022	
PBGen. Ronald Lee	August 2022 – January 10, 2023	
PMGen. Romeo Caramat	January 10, 2023 – May 3, 2024	
PMGen. Leo M. Francisco	May 3, 2024 – September 24, 2024	
PMGen. Nicolas Deloso Torre III	September 25, 2024 – June 2, 2025	
PBGen. Romeo Juan Macapaz	June 19 – July 28, 2025	
PBGen. Christopher N. Abrahano	July 28, 2025 – September 2, 2025	
PMGen. Robert Alexander A Morico II	September 2, 2025 - Present	

Acting in italic.

== Portrayal ==
CIDG was used by the Philippine TV series Ang Probinsyano until 2019. The main protagonist, some antagonists and some supporting casts of this series are playing as police officers of the group.
