= Teodulo Topacio =

Filipino veterinarian (1924–2019)

- Born: Teodulo Masangao Topacio Jr. November 30, 1924; Imus, Cavite, Philippine Islands
- Died: July 9, 2019 (aged 94)
- Education: University of the Philippines Diliman
- Medical career
- Profession: Veterinarian
- Field: Veterinary medicine
- Institutions: National Academy of Science and Technology
- Sub-specialties: Public health Animal protection/production

Teodulo Masangao Topacio Jr. was a Filipino veterinarian who was recognized as a National Scientist of the Philippines in 2009 for his research on leptospirosis.

== Early life and education ==
Teodulo Masangao Topacio Jr. was born on November 30, 1924, in Imus, Cavite to an illustrado family. His father Topacio Sr. is a veterinarian who contributed to the efforts of eradicating rinderpest in the Philippines in the 1930s via a modified vaccine—the first in Asia to do so.

The younger Topacio graduated with a degree in veterinary medicine at the University of the Philippines Diliman. He topped the Veterinary Licensure Examinations in 1951.

Topacio studied in the United States with the United States Agency for International Development from 1955 to 1963 under a scholarship. Topacio then trained with the New York State College of Veterinary Medicine at Cornell University before finishing a maser's degree in science at the Michigan State University in 1956 and a doctorate in the veterinary medicine at Purdue University in 1963.

== Career ==
=== Research ===
Topacio is known for his research on leptospirosis on domesticated animals, and contributed to the institutional control measures for the disease in the Philippines. He helped make the first scientific confirmation of the presence of the pathogen in the country.

He also contributed to the prevention of the foot-and-mouth disease in livestock in the Philippines. He also researched on brucellosis, fasciolosis, canine viral disease, and tumor in cats.

=== National Academy of Science and Technology ===
Topacio was elected to the National Academy of Science and Technology (NAST) in 1993. Annotated Bibliography on Philippine Biodiversity: Animal Diseases – Prevention and Control published by NAST in 2002 was authored by Topacio and serves as a guidebook for veterinarian and health practitioners in the Philippines.

=== Involvement in other organizations ===
Topacio served as an educator at the College of Veterinary Medicine back in 1951 when the University of the Philippines institution was still in the Diliman campus. He was dean from 1964 to 1969.

Topacio organized the Univet Veterinary Research and Development, the animal healthcare arm of the pharmaceutical company Unilab.

Topacio worked with various international organizations as a consultant such as the World Health Organization, Food and Agriculture Organization, and the Asian Development Bank.

Under his capacity as consultant for the EDL Group, Topacio worked with Philippine animal health company Excelvac to develop Excelvac Coryza, a poultry vaccine for coryza, fowl cholera and ornithosis. The vaccine received its first certificate of product registration on September 30, 2014.

=== Legislation lobbying ===
Topacio joined other health experts into lobbying for the passage of bills which eventually became the Philippine Veterinary Medicine Act of 2004 and the Anti-Rabies Act of 2007.

== Recognition ==
In 2009, Topacio was conferred the Order of the National Scientist of the Philippines. The World Veterinary Association conferred Topacio the Lifetime Achievement Award in 2014 for his role in helping the development of a poultry vaccine for Excelvac.

== Death ==
Topacio died on July 9, 2019.
