= Potenciano Gregorio =

Filipino musician (1880–1939)

- Born: May 18, 1880 Lib-og, Albay, Captaincy General of the Philippines, Spanish Empire
- Died: February 12, 1939 (aged 58) Honolulu, Territory of Hawaii, U.S.
- Occupation: Musician, composer
- Citizenship: Philippines

Potenciano Gregorio, often referred to as Potenciano Gregorio Sr. (May 19, 1880 - February 12, 1939) was a Bicolano musician. He was the composer of "Sarung Banggi" (One Evening), a waltz that is the most famous song in the Bikol language.

Potenciano Gregorio was born in what was then known as the town of Lib-og (now Santo Domingo) in the province of Albay in the Philippines. His parents were Narciso Gregorio and Canuta Valladolid (some sources spell his mother's name as Balladolid). At an early age he learned to play the violin and was soon recognized for his talent. He subsequently learned to play other instruments such as the bandurria, the guitar, and piano. Later he started writing music for the local church by himself or in collaboration with his older brother Bernardo who organized the local band Banda de Lib-og. Potenciano later became the bandmaster of the same band until he joined the Philippine Constabulary Band in 1919.

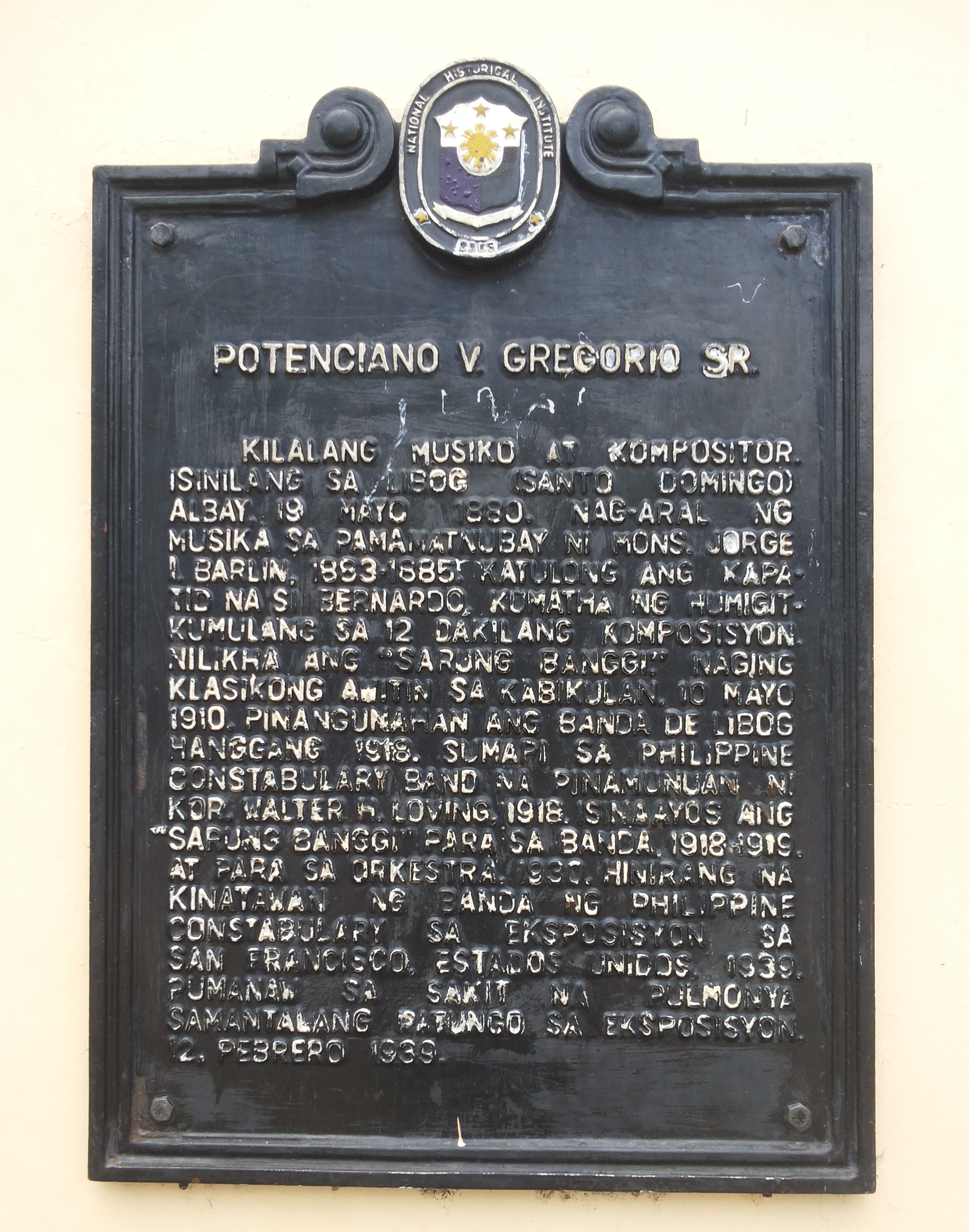
Historical marker installed in 2005

It is claimed that Potenciano Gregorio composed "Sarung Banggi" when he was 17 years old. There are different versions as to how he composed this song. Hilario Balilo, the former town mayor stated that the composer wrote the music and lyrics of the song one night after hearing a bird chirping and the leaves rustling. He based this version on information he received from Justo Gregorio, a nephew of Potenciano. Resurrecion Gregorio, a grandson of Potenciano however claimed that the song was written during the 1897 eruption of Mayon volcano and initially the composer wanted to dedicate the song to his then fiancée Dominga Duran whom he later married.

Potenciano Gregorio later sold the rights to the song to Constancio de Guzman.

He also wrote other songs like "Pusong Tagub nin Sakit" and "Hinuyop-hoyop nin Dios".

In 1919, he joined the Philippine Constabulary band under the tutelage of Col. Walter Loving.

Potenciano Gregorio was among those invited to compete with other musicians during the Golden Gate International Exposition in 1938. However, while he was overseas, he died in 1939 of pneumonia in Honolulu. His remains were brought back to the Philippines and buried in La Loma Cemetery in Manila. In 2005, his remains were exhumed and brought to his hometown of Santo Domingo where they were reinterred. He was given full military honors at the Potenciano Gregorio garden Camp General Simeon A Ola upon his remains' arrival.

In 1961, a fire hit Santo Domingo which destroyed Potenciano Gregorio's ancestral home.
