= Obet Verzola =

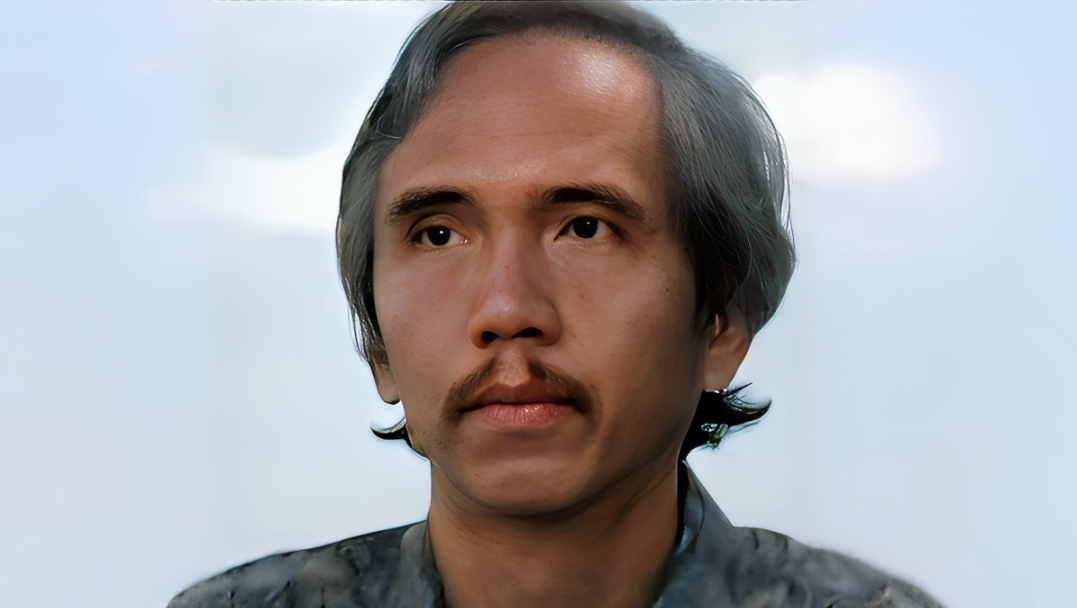
Roberto Verzola: technologist, activist and author

Roberto S. Verzola (November 4, 1952 - May 6, 2020), often known by his nickname as Obet Verzola, was an activist, environmentalist, writer, math professor, and electrical engineer. He is often touted as the "Father of Philippine email" for having setting up emails and internet connections for numerous Philippine Non-Government Organizations in 1992 - several years before internet access became commercially available in the Philippines. He is also known for advocating against the commercialization of genetically modified Bacillus thuringiensis (BT) corn, for the phasing out of the Bataan Nuclear Power Plant, for the implementation of the System of Rice Intensification (SRI) management system in the Philippines, and for his key role in numerous civil organizations in the Philippines, most notably the Philippine Greens, the Center for Renewable Energy and Sustainable Technology (CREST), SRI-Pilipinas, Tanggol Kalikasan, the Philippine Permaculture Association, and the Global Alliance for Incinerator Alternatives. Verzola was also outspoken about his experiences as a political detainee and torture victim during the Marcos dictatorship, having been caught in October 1974 and detained until 1977.

== Detention and torture (1974-1977) ==
Verzola was also outspoken about his experiences as a political detainee and torture victim during the Marcos dictatorship, having been caught in October 1974 and detained until 1977. During his detention, he was moved around from military camp to military camp - most notably Camp Crame, Camp Panopio, and the Ipil Detention Center - as he was alternatingly tortured by the Intelligence Service of the Armed Forces of the Philippines, the Metrocom Intelligence and Security Group, and the Philippine Constabulary's 5th Constabulary Security Unit.

== Father of Philippine email (1992) ==
In 1992, Verzola famously set up internet connections and email addresses for a number of environmentalist civil society organizations in the Philippines. This was two years before the Philippine government established its own internet connection in the form of Philippine Network Foundation (PHNet). When internet access became widely commercially available in the Philippines and internet service fees began to be regulated, Verzola opted to discontinue his service, rather than charge higher fees for it. This led Verzola to be widely referred to as the "Father of Philippine email."

== BT corn protest and hunger strike (2003) ==
In 2003, Verzola led the protest against President Gloria Macapagal Arroyo's approval of Monsanto Corporation's proposal to sell seeds of genetically modified Bacillus thuringiensis (BT) corn in the Philippines. This included a month-long hunger strike in front of the Philippines Department of Agriculture which ended only after seeds had already been sold and dispersed throughout the Philippine Market. Verzola characterized the incident as a failure of the Philippine Government to protect the Filipino people.

== Death ==
On May 6, 2020, Verzola died at age 67 from sepsis and pneumonia which he developed in the wake of various surgeries. While his death took place during the COVID-19 pandemic in the Philippines, news reports clarified that his illness was not COVID-related.

== Legacy ==
Verzola was widely mourned by Philippine civil society groups and environmental advocates, as well as the segments of the international development community with which he engaged. He was posthumously awarded the biannual Gawad Bayani ng Kalikasan award by Center for Environmental Concerns - Philippines in September 2020, in the same year as fellow environmentalist Gina Lopez.

Verzola was also a Gawad Lagablab Awardee for Applied Sciences of the Philippine Science High School system.

== Written works ==
Verzola's most notable written works included the books Crossing Over: The Energy Transition to Renewable Energy and Towards a Political Economy of Information.

== See also ==
- Human rights abuses of the Marcos dictatorship
- Pete Lacaba
- Gina Lopez
