= Pedro B. Navarro Jr. =

Pedro Navarro Jr.
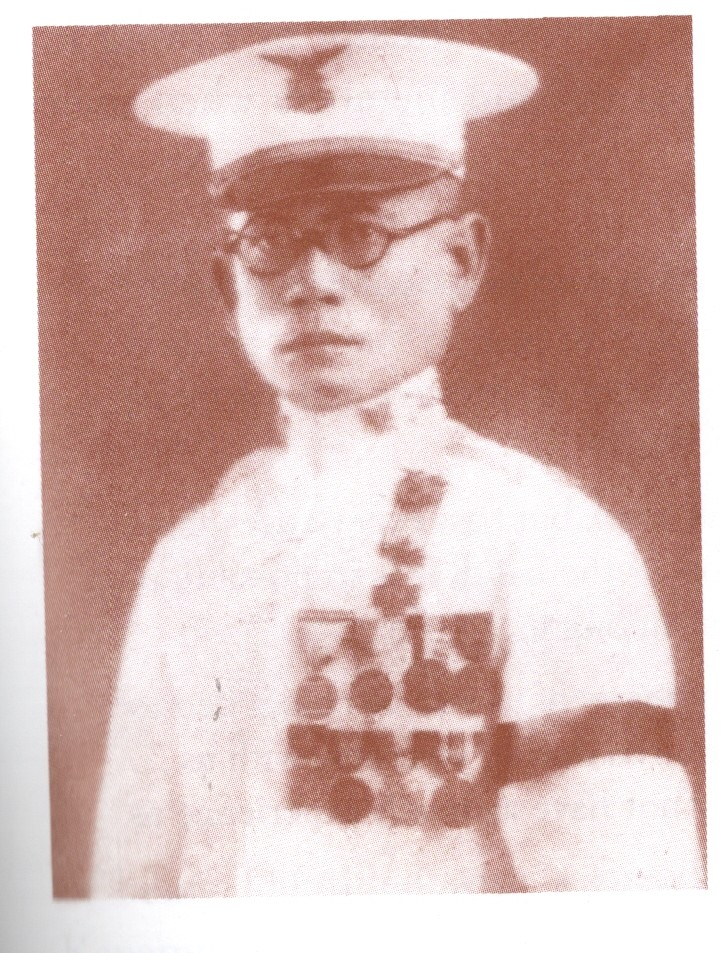
- Navarro in 1917

Background information
- Born: Pedro Navarro y Bravo; June 29, 1879; Tagudin, Ilocos Sur, Captaincy General of the Philippines
- Formerly of: Philippine Constabulary Band

Capt. Pedro Navarro y Bravo (29 June 1879 – unknown), more commonly known as Pedro B. Navarro Jr., was a Filipino bandleader. He was known as the first Filipino who became the leader of the Philippine Constabulary Band.

== Biography ==
=== Early life and education ===
Pedro B. Navarro, Jr. was born in Tagudin, Ilocos Sur on June 29, 1879 to Pedro Navarro, Sr. and Bartola Bravo. At an early age, he became a choirboy at a local convent. There, he was informally taught "canto llano", play the violin, and flute. Eager to learn music, he was accompanied by Fr. Mariano Ortiz to Manila where he entered the Saint Augustine convent. He received musical education from Marcelo Adonay who was then "Maestro di cappella". He was choirboy from 1894 to 1898. From 1908 to 1911, he was taught by José Masllovet in musical composition.

=== Career ===
After the outbreak of the Philippine Revolution, he left the Augustinian convent for Manila. In 1899, he joined the Philippine Band personally directed by Charles Mindt. He later entered the 12th Volunteer Band and the 6th Artillery Band. During his time there, Walter H. Loving became interested in Navarro and succeeded at recruiting him. In 1903, he enlisted himself at the Philippine Constabulary Band where his most played instrument was the piccolo. In 1907, he became assistant conductor succeeding Pedro Cruz and in 1916 he became permanent band leader after Loving went to the United States only to be hospitalized. Under Loving's leadership he was said to be a good wind instrument player, composer, and a good successor as band director. Navarro also impressed Resident Commissioner for the U.S. Manuel L. Quezon that he was commissioned third lieutenant. Quezon also made him permanent director of the band after Loving.

After his succession, Navarro was greeted by his friends and acquaintances. Under his leadership, he promised to make the Philippine Constabulary Band internationally well-known. He also wished the band to keep its prestige and image. In terms of his leadership style, he was described as strict during rehearhals. Bañas, writing on his biography, stated that he would "at once correct the slightest mistake". His leadership only lasted by a year as he retired on 1917. His time as a conductor won the admiration of leading bandmasters, including John Philip Sousa.

=== Retirement ===
As a military officer, Navarro received badges as a carbine and revolver expert from the 1920 target season. As a retired bandleader of the Philippine Constabulary Band, he continued his musical expertise by composing marches and other manuscripts, some are works from Bataan such as his "General Cramer", a military march, and his "The Hero", a funeral march.

== Works and legacy ==
=== Works ===
Navarro's works written in manuscripts at Bataan were:

- General Cramer, a military march for band
- Virginia, a caprice for pianoforte
- The Hero, a funeral march
- Balanga Maids and Miss Consuelo Gayoso, fox-trot for pianoforte and orchestra

In Baguio, he composed:

- "1919–1920 Baguio Academy Cadets", a military march
- Solitude, a caprice for pianoforte

=== Legacy ===
In 2013, the UP Symphonic Band dedicated a concert called "An Ode to the Filipino People". According to Dean Jose Buenconsejo of UP College of Music, the concert was made to commemorate the music bandmasters of the early 20th century. Some of the highlight of Navarro's works included in the concert were:

- Paso Doble
- Petit Divertissement for Trombone
- Colonel Loving March
- "Id Est", solo for B-flat cornet

Despite his shortcomings as a bandleader of the Philippine Constabulary Band, he was praised by the Filipino populace during his time as a member of the band. His travels through the United States earned him numerous awards and was admired by foreign music professors. Navarro immensely improved the image of Filipinos as bandmasters.
