= Rafael Crame =

Filipino Constabulary officer (1863–1927)

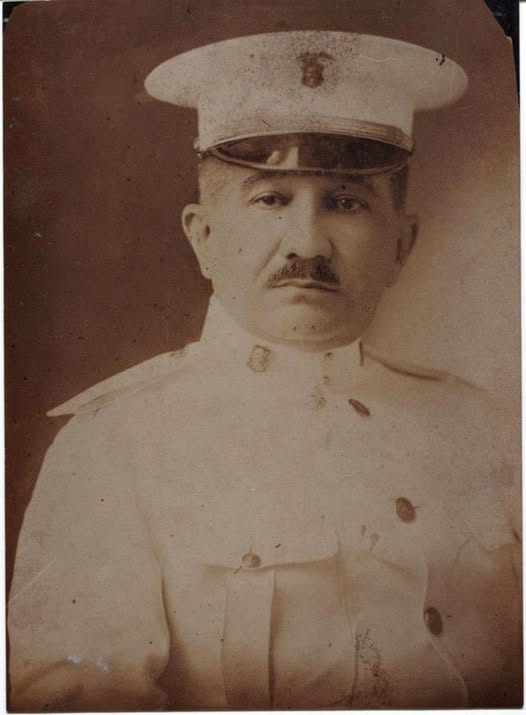
- Brigadier General Rafael Crame

Chief of Philippine Constabulary
- In office 1917–1927
- Governors-General: Leonard Wood; Charles Yeater (acting); Francis Burton Harrison
- Preceded by: Herman Hall
- Succeeded by: Charles Nathorst

Personal details
- Born: Rafael Crame y Pérez de Tagle; October 2, 1863 Tambobong, Manila, Captaincy General of the Philippines, Spanish Empire
- Died: January 1, 1927 (aged 63) Manila, Philippine Islands
- Education: Spanish Military Academy (Toledo)
- Awards: Medal of Valor

Military service
- Allegiance: (Commonwealth of the Philippines) Philippines (1922–1945); Spanish Empire
- Branch/service: Philippine Constabulary; Spanish Army
- Years of service: 1902–1927; 1881–1898
- Rank: Brigadier general Captain (Spanish Army)
- Battles/wars: Philippine Revolution

Rafael Crame y Pérez de Tagle (October 2, 1863 - January 1, 1927) was a Filipino constabulary officer who served as Chief of the Philippine Constabulary from 1917 until his death in 1927.

== Early life and education ==
Rafael Crame was born in Tambobong, Province of Manila (now Malabon, Metro Manila) to Don Rafael María de Crame y González Calderon, an artillery officer in the Spanish Army in the Philippines, while his mother was Maria Perez de Tagle. His grandfather was Joaquín Rafael de Crame (b. 1786) who was the Spanish Governor-General of the Philippines in 1835.

Crame studied at the Ateneo Municipal de Manila and then enrolled in the Spanish military academy from 1879 up to 1881.

== Career ==
Upon completion of his cadetship, Crame was employed by the Spanish government in the Negociado de Contribución Territorial. He was a government official in the Administración de Hacienda Pública when the Philippine Revolution broke out in 1896. He served in a battalion of volunteer forces organized by the Spanish armed forces.

Crame joined the Philippine Constabulary in 1902 after being invited by a certain Captain Alkinson. Crame started with the rank of fourth class inspector and gradually rose from the ranks to become a colonel by 1914.

In 1907, Captain Rafael Crame presided over the preliminary investigation of Philippine Independence Leader Macario Sakay and his group after they were arrested in a deceitful entrapment orchestrated by the American officials who initially promised general amnesty. The accused were charged under the Brigand Act and Sakay was later convicted and hanged.

In December 1917, Crame was named as chief of the Constabulary and attained the rank of brigadier general. Due to Crame being a seasoned intelligence officer who formerly served in the constabulary's Information Department, Governor General Leonard Wood also made him his constabulary's chief. Under Wood, Crame was directed to suppress the nationalist movement in the islands through a "subtle strategy". The Philippine Constabulary was also used to silence opposition against the governor-general.

The American Medal of Valor was awarded to him for helping quash a mutiny in Manila in 1921. He was said to have declined the citation when he said, "I only did my duty".

== Recognition ==
Crame is recognized for being the first Filipino to become chief of the Philippine Constabulary.

Crame was buried at his family grave at La Loma Cemetery. On August 7, 2003, 76 years after his death, Crame's remains were exhumed from the La Loma Cemetery in Manila, and he was given a hero's burial at the Libingan ng mga Bayani in Taguig the following day. Camp Crame, the place that houses the Philippine National Police, was named after him due to his contributions to the Philippine Constabulary and for his being a positive role model to the Philippine para-military police force during his time.

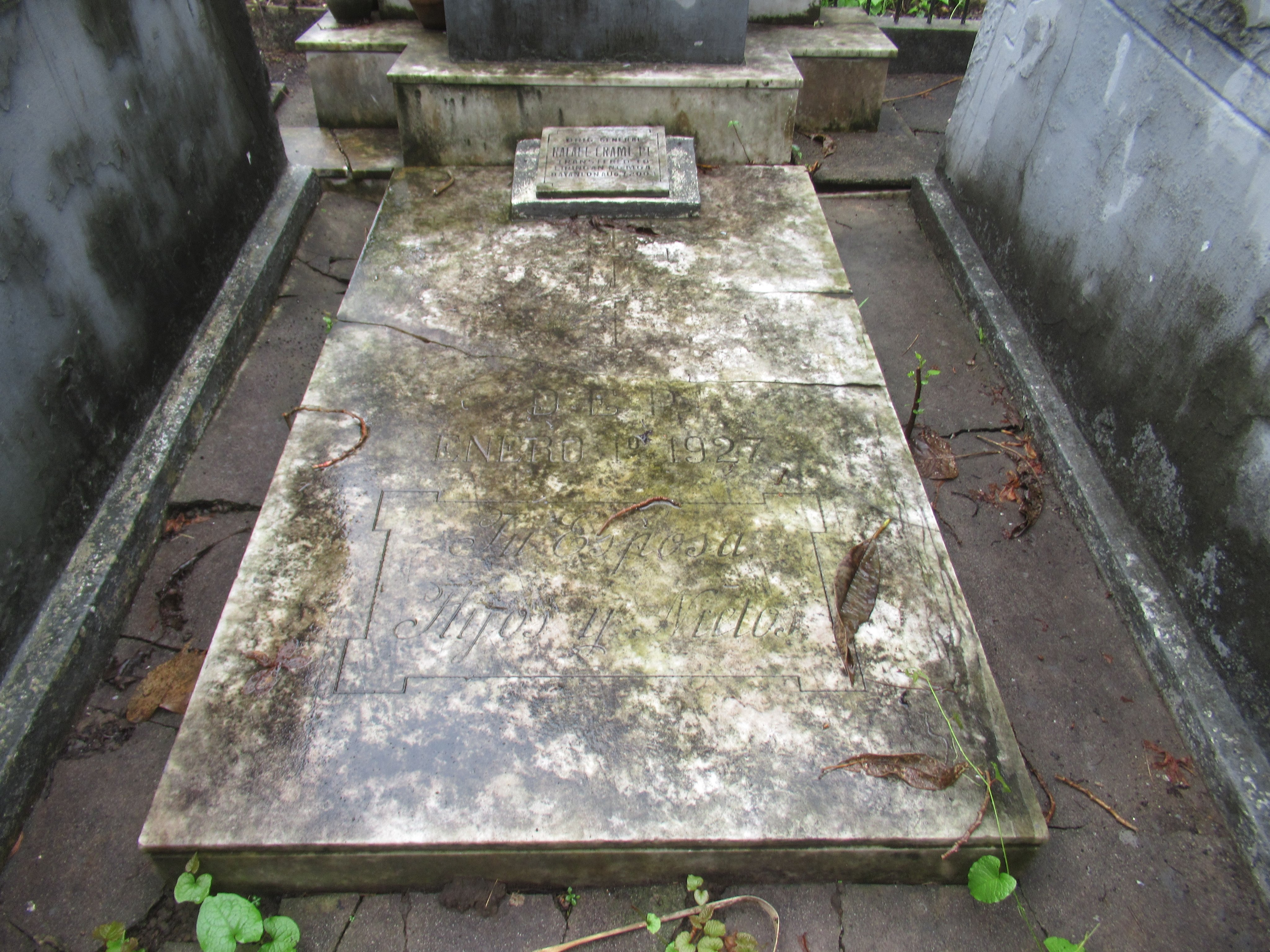
La Loma Cemetery

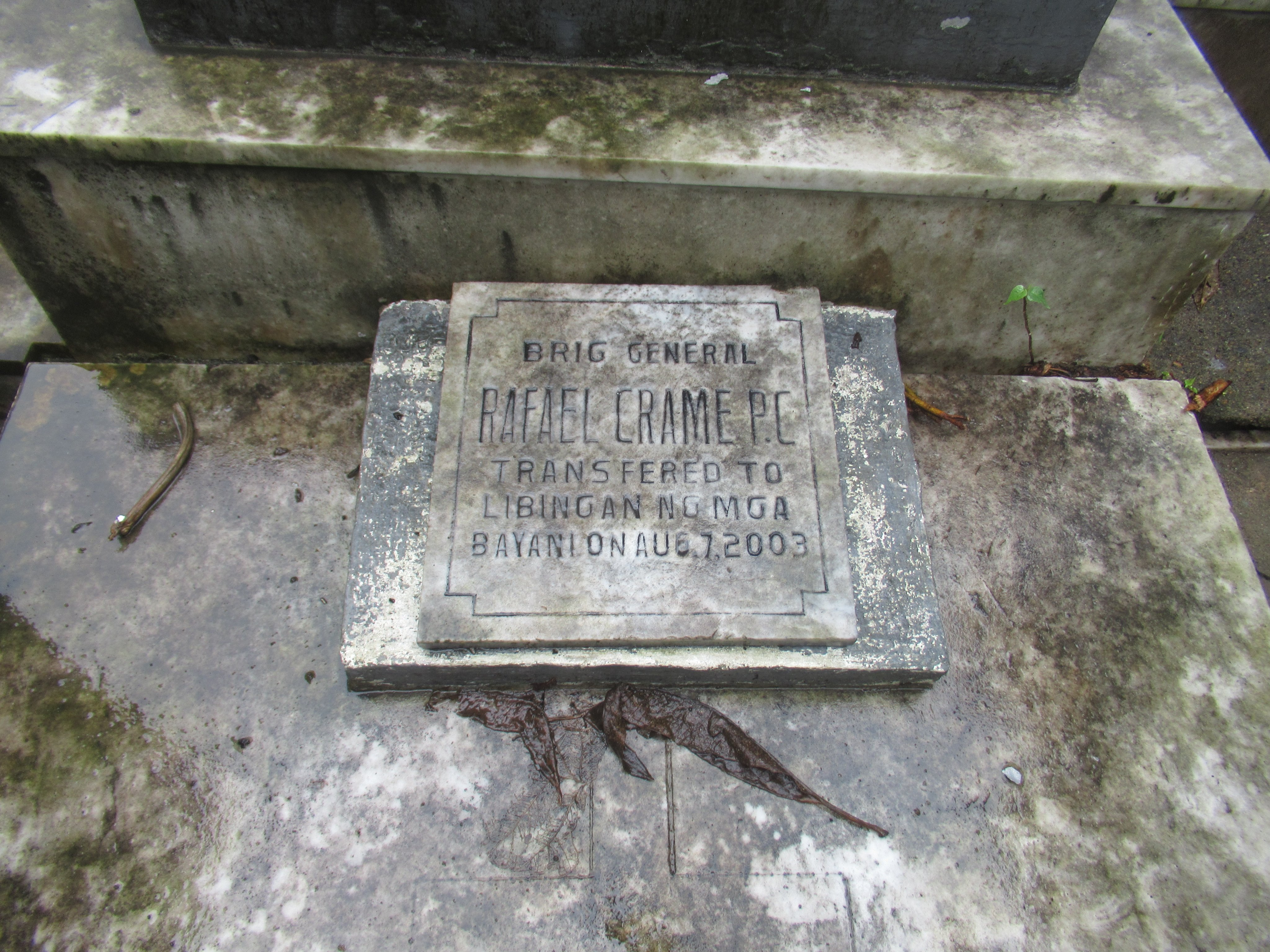
Crame's original tomb

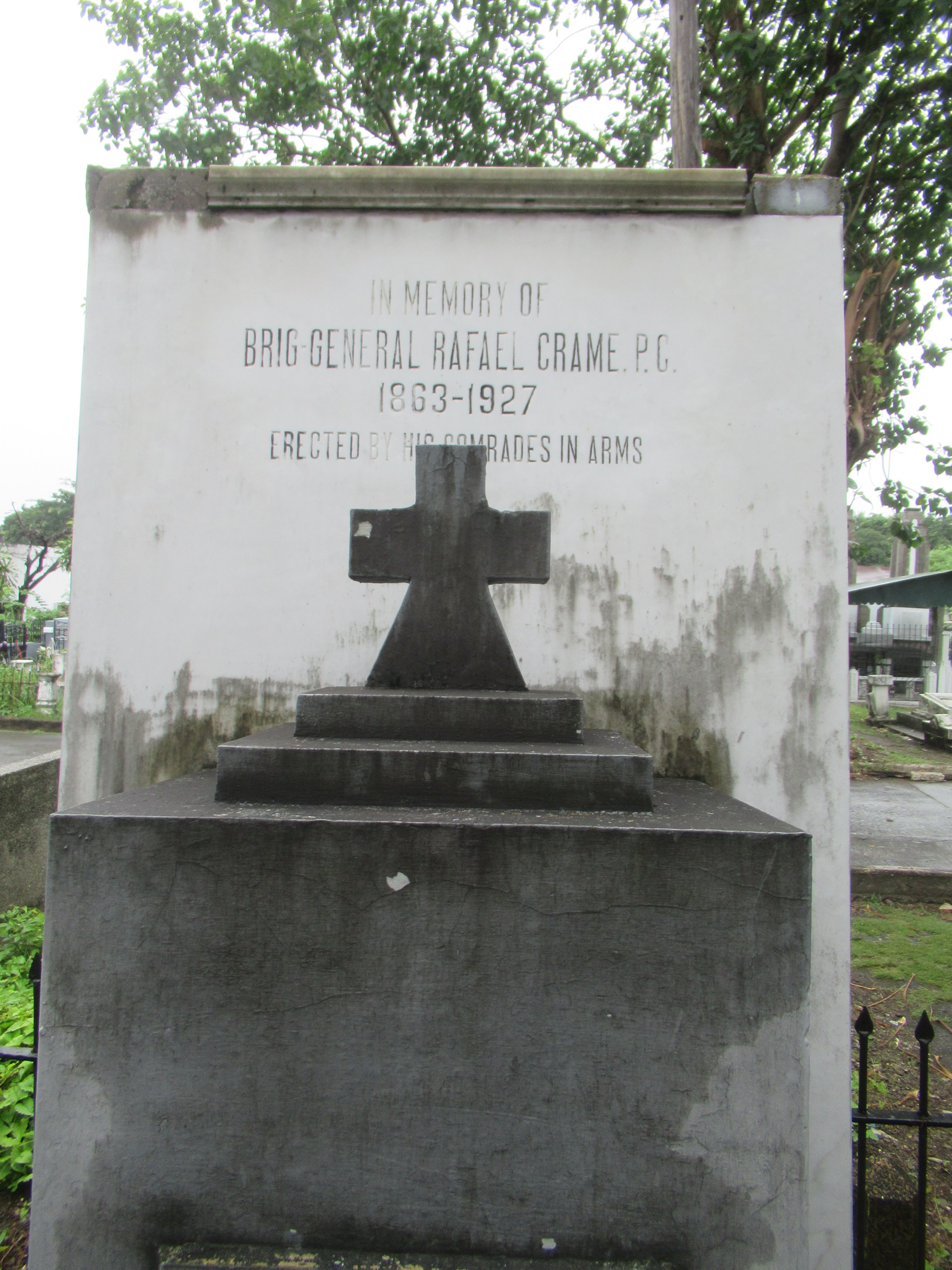
Family grave

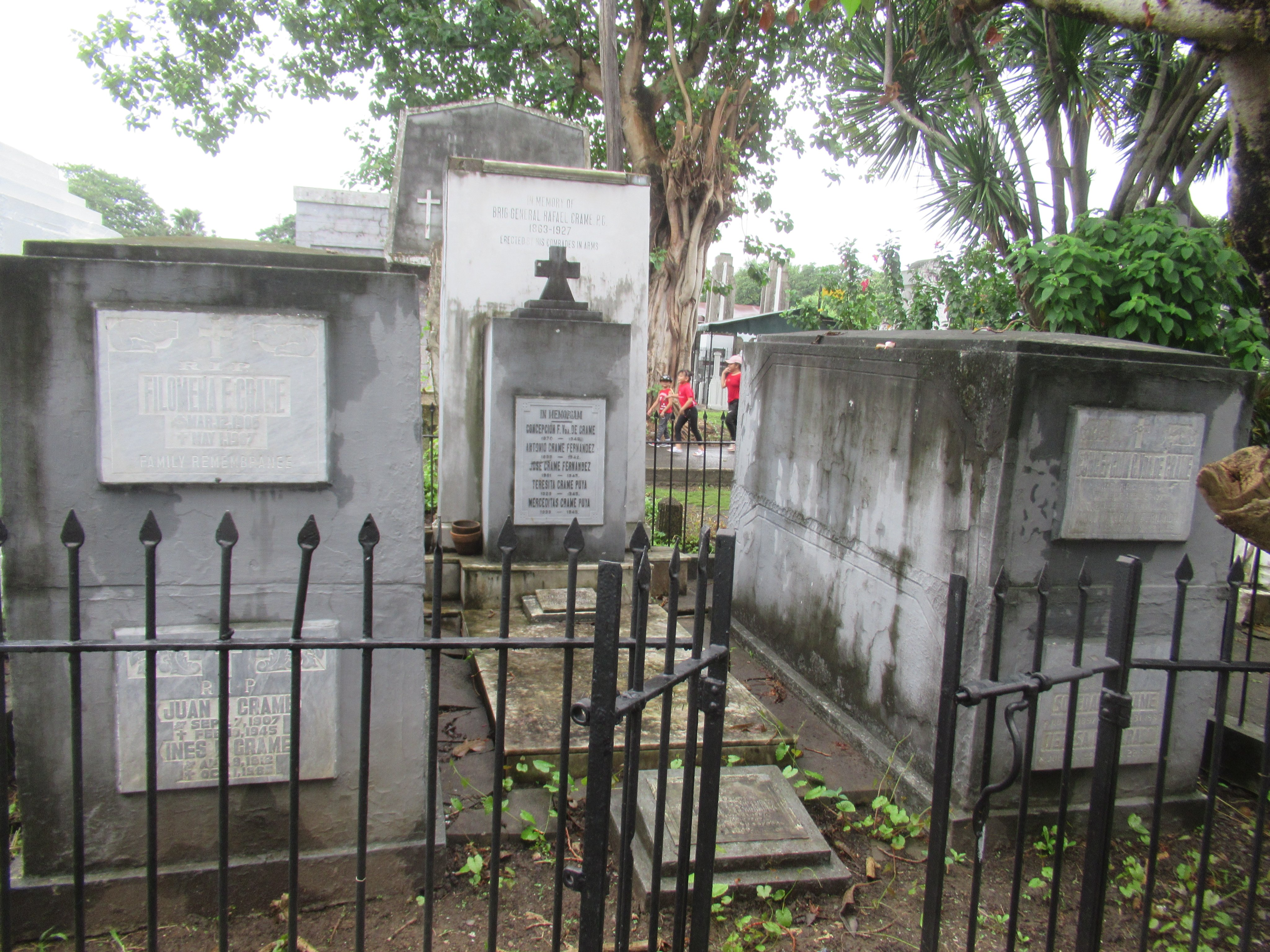
Crame's family grave

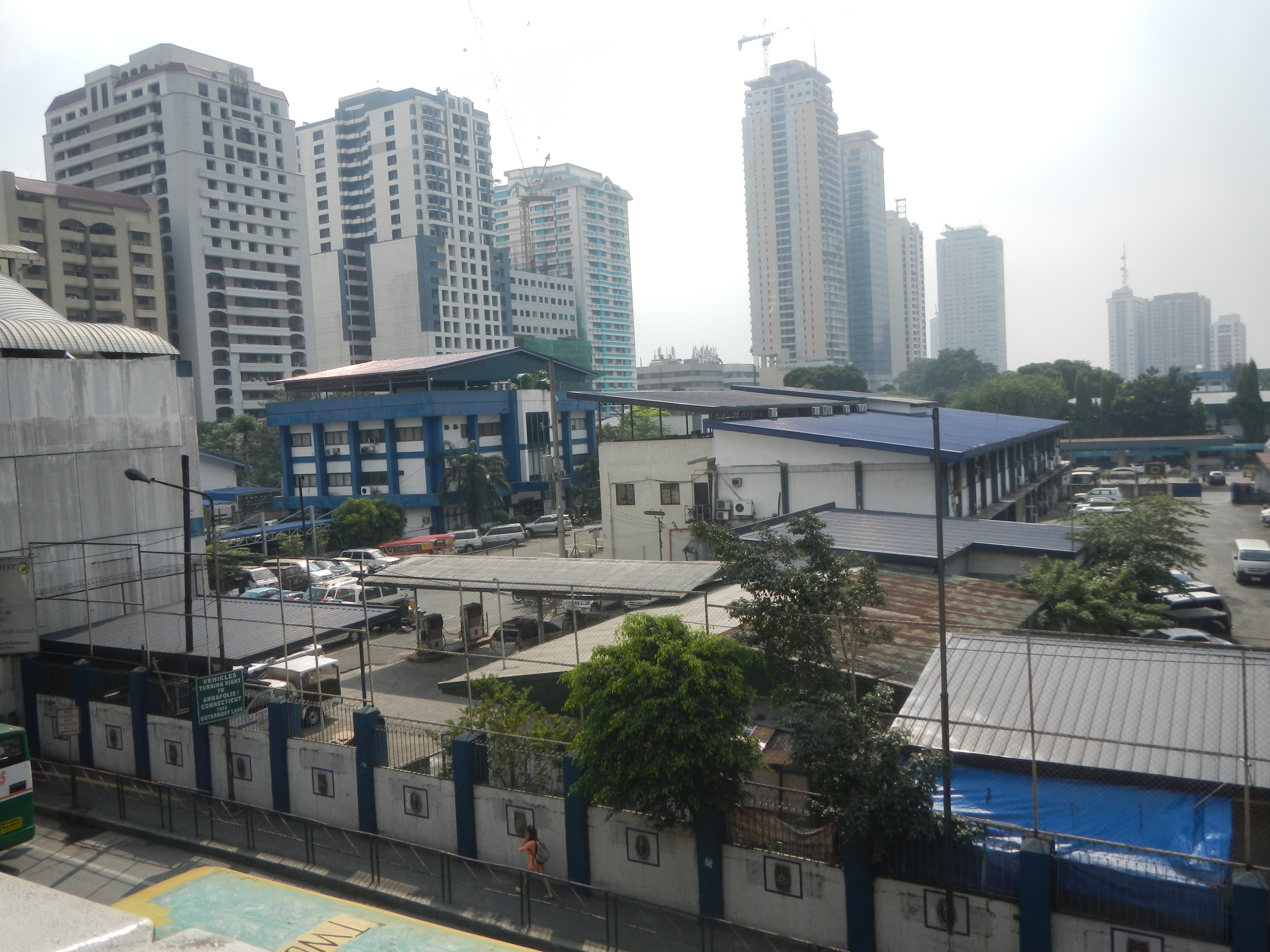
Camp Crame
