= Camp Crame =

Philippine National Police headquarters in Quezon City

Camp General Rafael T. Crame
- Kampo Heneral Rafael T. Crame (Filipino)
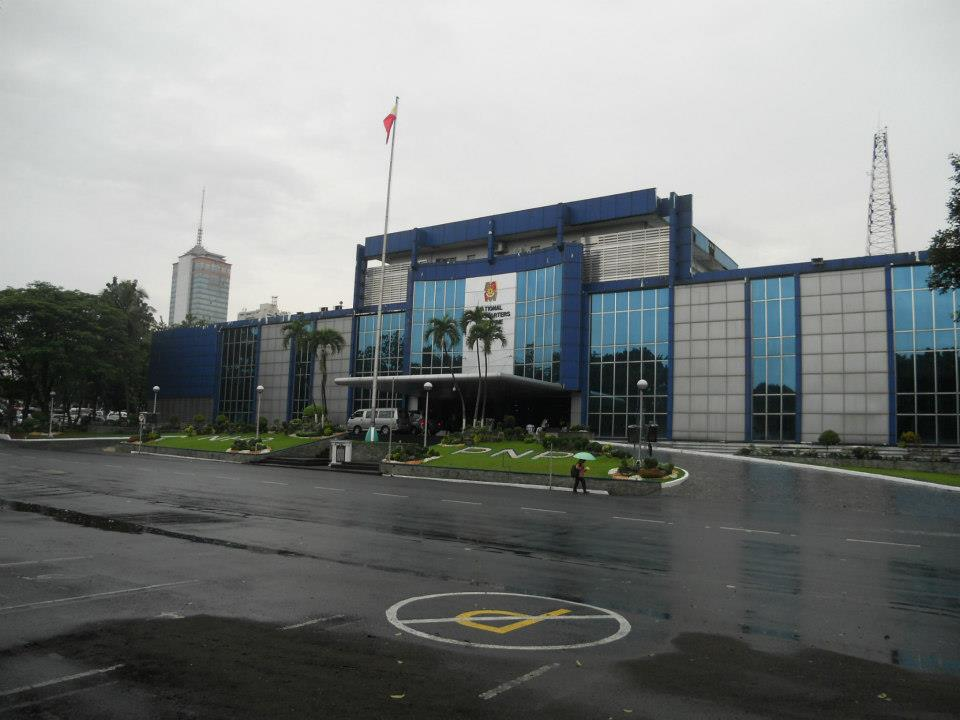
- Main Office Building
- Interactive map of the Camp General Rafael T. Crame area

General information
- Location: Epifanio de los Santos Avenue, Quezon City, Philippines
- Coordinates: 14°36′32.86″N 121°3′11.57″E
- Current tenants: Philippine National Police
- Named for: Rafael Cramé

Camp General Rafael T. Crame (Tagalog: [ˈkramɛ]) is the national headquarters of the Philippine National Police (PNP) located along Epifanio de los Santos Avenue (EDSA) in Quezon City. It is situated across EDSA from Camp Aguinaldo, the national headquarters of the Armed Forces of the Philippines (AFP). Prior to the establishment of the civilian PNP, Camp Crame was the national headquarters of the Philippine Constabulary, a gendarmerie-type military police force which was the PNP's predecessor.

Camp Crame was named after the first Filipino chief of the Philippine Constabulary, Brigadier General Rafael Crame.

== History ==
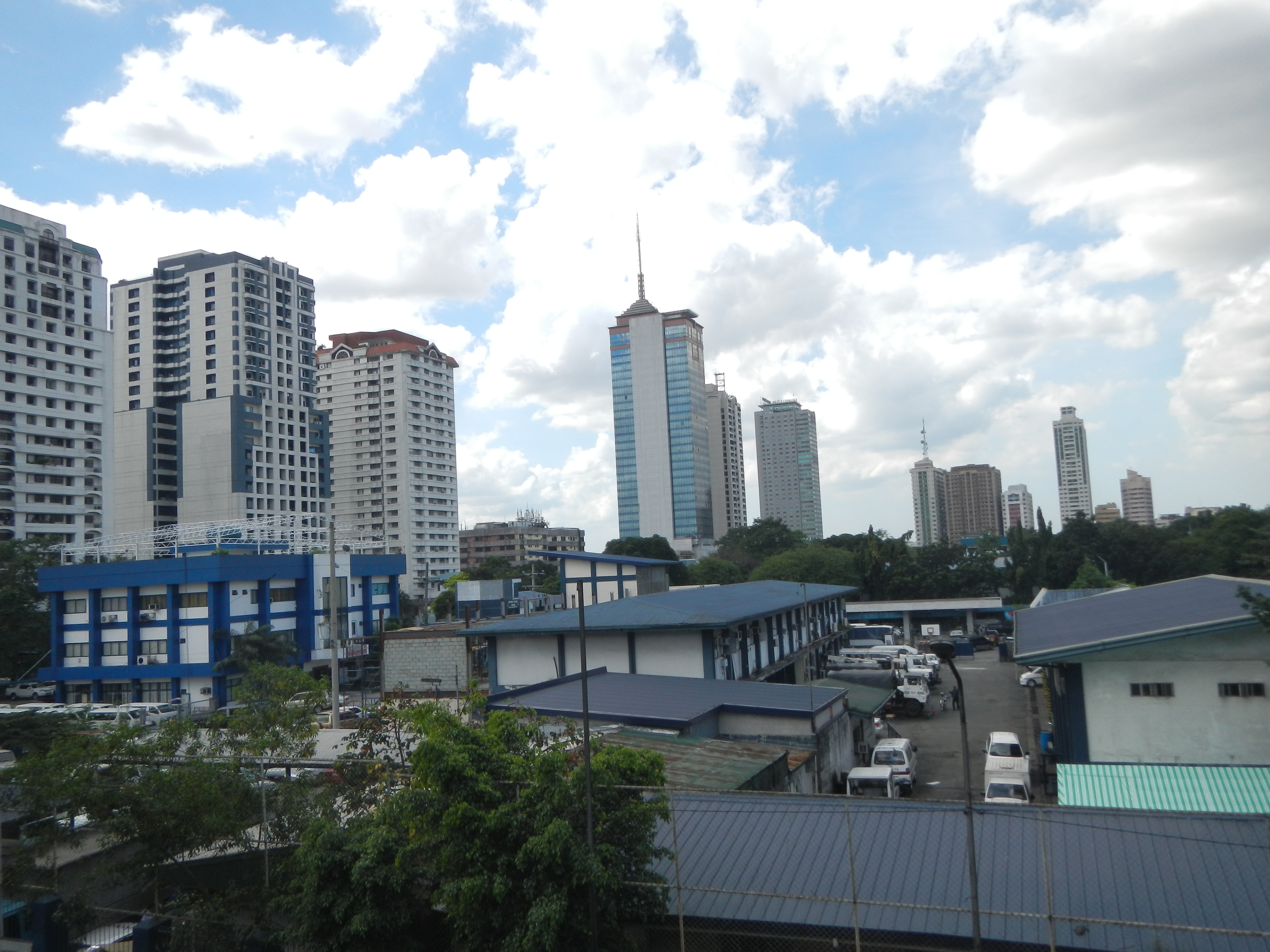
The blue-roofed Philippine National Police, Camp Crame buildings as viewed from the Santolan - Annapolis station.

=== Establishment ===
In 1935, the Philippine Constabulary struck a deal with the City Government of Manila to exchange its Gagalangin barracks compound in Tondo (now the site of Florentino Torres High School) for a large tract of land in the New Manila Heights, which was then part of San Juan, Rizal. Part of this tract became Camp Crame, Camp Murphy (now Camp Aguinaldo), and Zablan Field, site the Philippine Constabulary Air Corps (PCAC, now Barangay White Plains in Quezon City). The camp was later transferred to the jurisdiction of Quezon City in 1941, and briefly became part of the City of Greater Manila, resulting from Quezon City's merger with Manila and several Rizal towns, from 1942 to 1945.

Camp Crame was named after Brigadier General Rafael Crame, who served as the appointed first Filipino Chief of the Philippine Constabulary from 1917 to 1927.

=== Pre-independence years ===
The Philippine Constabulary was reorganized numerous times during the Philippines' commonwealth era, being dissolved and reconstituted as the nucleus of the Philippine Army at one point, and then reestablished as a police unit under the Army when the Commonwealth's new state police proved too difficult to manage and had to be dissolved.

Camp Crame was where the PC's General Strike Force was organized under Brig. Gen. Guillermo Francisco in 1939.

=== Philippine Constabulary Headquarters ===
After World War II, Camp Crame was used as the headquarters of the Philippine Constabulary, which service command was then considered part of the Armed Forces of the Philippines (AFP).

=== During the Marcos regime ===
As the headquarters of the Philippine Constabulary, Camp Crame became the site of five of the Marcos regime's most infamous detention facilities for political prisoners: the Men's Detention Center; the Women's Detention Center, the PC (Philippine Constabulary) Stockade; the MetroCom (Metropolitan Command) Detention Area; and the CIS (Criminal Investigation Service) Detention Area.

In the hours just before Martial Law was officially announced on the evening of September 23, 1972, the Camp Crame Gymnasium became the site where the first hundred or so political prisoners - those caught from a list of about 400 journalists, educators, politicians, and others on a list of “National List of Target Personalities” who were labeled "subversives" because they had openly criticized Ferdinand Marcos - were brought before they were moved to other facilities such as Fort Magsaysay in Laur, Nueva Ecija or the various detention centers in Fort Bonifacio. The prisoners brought to Camp Crame included former President Sergio Osmeña's grandson Sergio "Serge" Osmeña III, Senators Soc Rodrigo and Ramon Mitra Jr., businessman Eugenio Lopez Jr., teacher Etta Rosales, lawyer Haydee Yorac, and a plethora of writers and broadcasters including Amando Doronila of the Daily Mirror, Luis Mauricio of the Philippine Graphic, Teodoro Locsin Sr. of the Philippines Free Press, Rolando Fadul of Taliba, Robert Ordoñez of the Philippine Herald, Rosalinda Galang of the Manila Times; Ernesto Granada of the Manila Chronicle, Maximo Soliven of the Manila Times, and Luis Beltran and Ruben Cusipag of the Evening News. These early detainees even included eleven opposition delegates from the 1971 Constitutional Convention, including Heherson Alvarez, Alejandro Lichuaco, Voltaire Garcia, Teofisto Guingona Jr., Philippines Free Press associate editor Napoleon Rama, and broadcaster Jose Mari Velez. The Gymnasium facilities were later used as a permanent detention facility, known as the Men's Detention Center.

The PC Stockade is noted as the place where the first death of a student while under government detention took place: Pamantasan ng Lungsod ng Maynila Communication Arts student Liliosa Hilao, who had been brutally tortured before she died.

Others who were detained in Camp Crame at different times during the Marcos dictatorship were writers Luis R. Mauricio and Ninotchka Rosca, Obet Verzola, Dolores Stephens Feria, Boni Ilagan, and Pete Lacaba, among others.

Numerous political prisoners were documented to have been tortured during their detention in Camp Crame, evidence of which was gathered by volunteers by the Roman Catholic Church-established Task Force Detainees of the Philippines and then reported to international human rights agencies such as Amnesty International.

Camp Crame was also the site of the Command for the Administration of Detainees (CAD), headed by PC Chief Fidel V. Ramos, which was the agency in charge of giving orders for the arrest and detention of the Marcos regime's political prisoners.

=== Role in the People Power revolution ===
Camp Crame later became one of the rallying points of people during the People Power revolution of 1986.

In February 1986, reports of election fraud during the 1986 Philippine presidential election caused unrest among Filipinos and saw the organization of various protest activities, including the massive Tagumpay Ng Bayan rally at Rizal Park on February 16, 1986, and a systematic boycott of products and companies associated with Marcos and his cronies. Hoping to take advantage of the disarray, the Reform the Armed Forces Movement (RAM) under then-Defense Secretary Juan Ponce Enrile attempted to stage a coup, and took over Camp Aguinaldo.

After he learned that Marcos' forces had uncovered the coup plot, Enrile invited PC Chief Fidel V. Ramos to join their cause and withdraw support from Marcos. Ramos agreed, and the two held a press conference to that effect in Camp Aguinaldo, after Ramos returned to Camp Crame, and Enrile Stayed in Camp Aguinaldo.

When Cardinal Jaime Sin learned about Enrile and Ramos' predicament, he went on air through Radio Veritas and appealed to Filipinos near Camps Aguinaldo and Crame to go to the stretch of EDSA in between the two camps, forming a human shield to prevent Marcos' forces from coming down hard on the coup plotters.

Marcos ordered the Philippine Air Force’s 15th Strike Wing, commanded by Colonel Antonio Sotelo, to neutralize the helicopters in Camp Crame. Instead of launching an airstrike, Sotelo and his men defected, bringing their helicopters and planes over to join Ramos' forces in Camp Crame.

Eventually Enrile and Ramos decided to consolidate their forces in Camp Aguinaldo, with the crowd gathered at EDSA creating a protective wall for Enrile's forces to leave Camp Aguinaldo and cross EDSA to get to join Ramos' forces in Camp Crame.

This began a series of events which saw Marcos thrown out of the country, Corazon Aquino installed as president of a Revolutionary Government, the coup plotters able to walk out of Camp Crame unscathed, and Marcos forced into exile in Hawaii.

=== Philippine National Police Headquarters ===
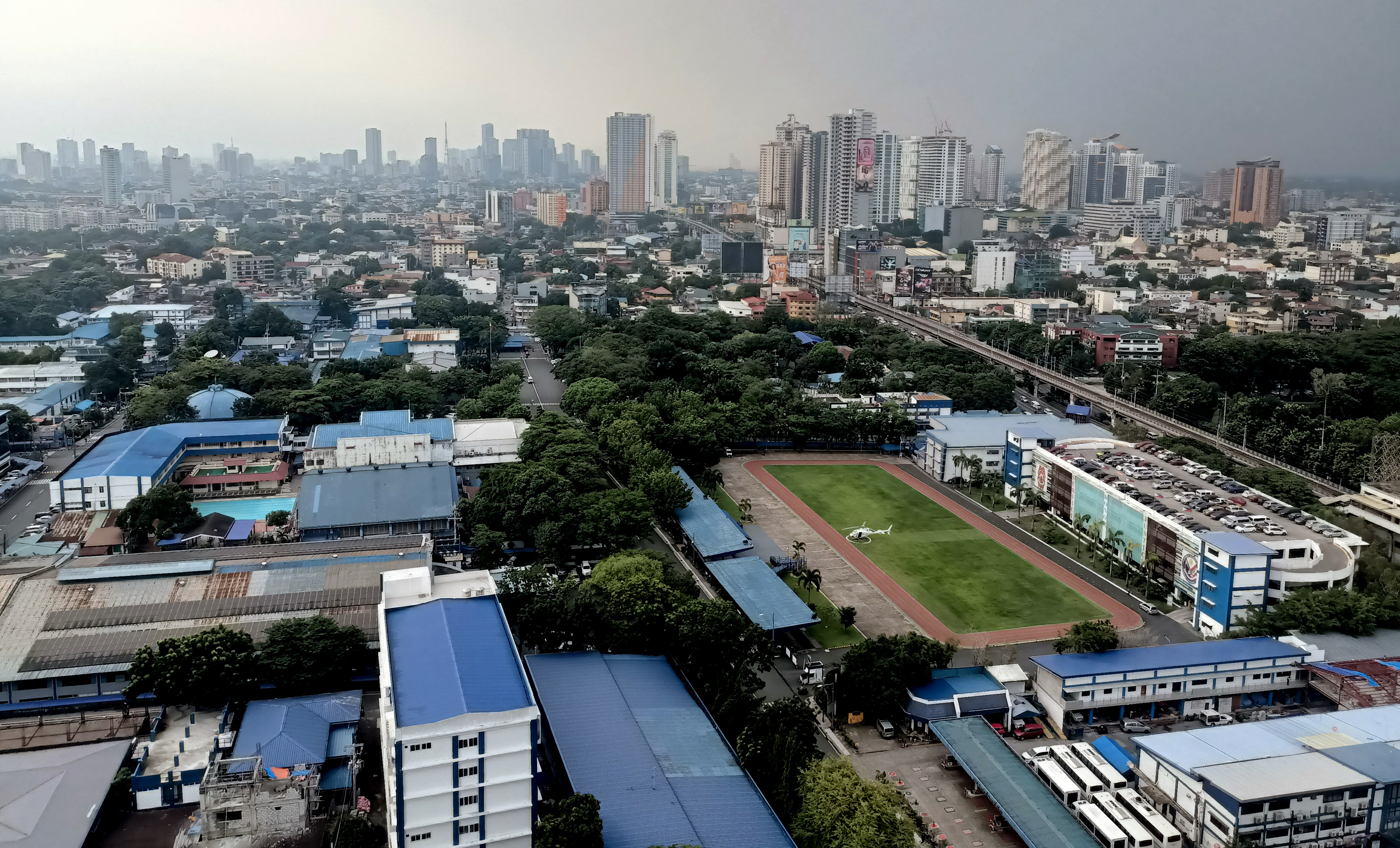
Camp Crame aerial view

Today, the camp serves as the headquarters of the Philippine National Police, the force established in 1991 as an entity separate from the AFP; despite the separation, however, the titles to the land on which Camp Crame stands were turned over to the PNP by the AFP only in July 2008.

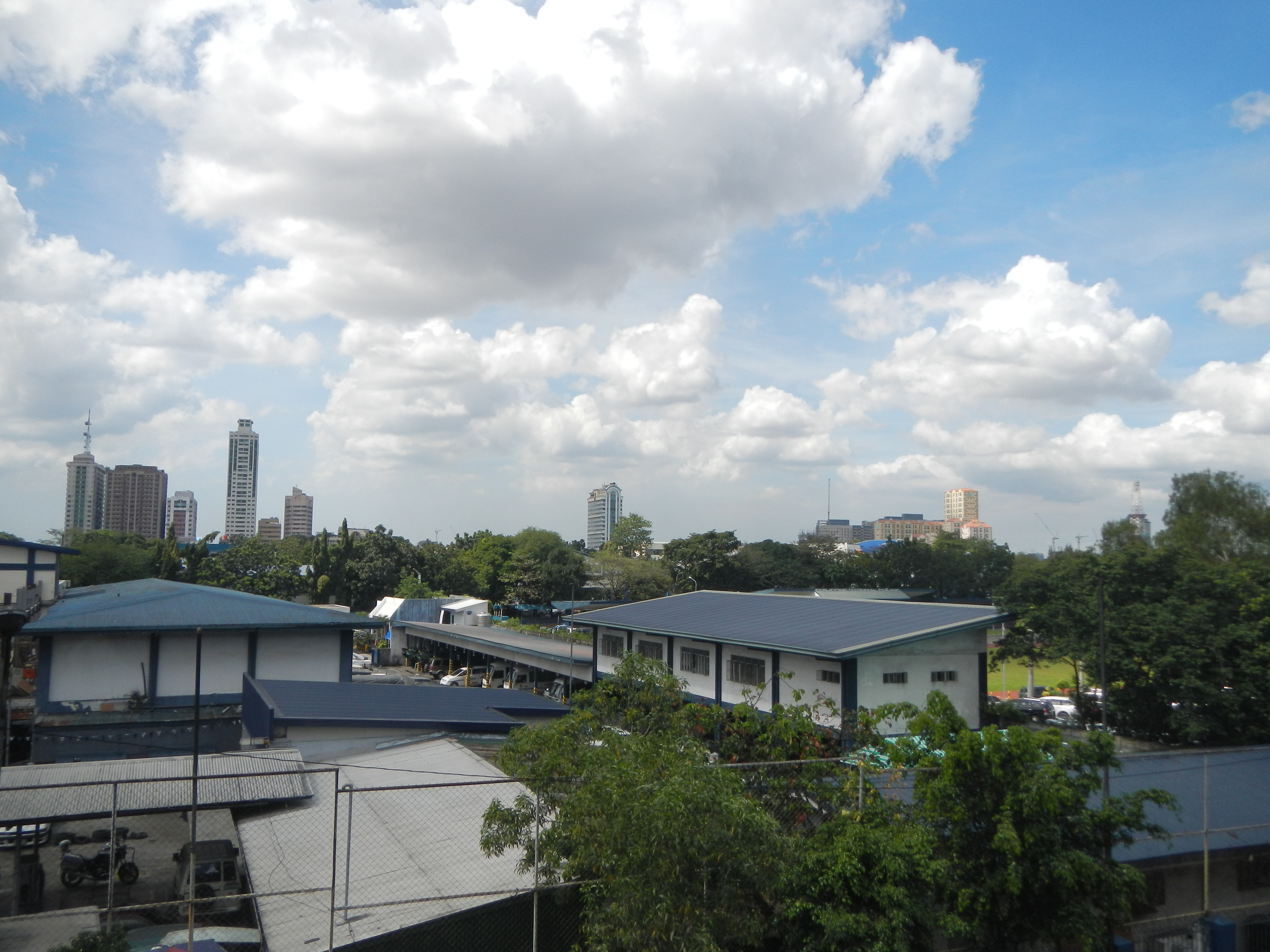
The camp's office buildings.

==== Custodial Center ====
Camp Crame host the PNP Custodial Center which serves as a detainment facility for high profile suspects. Several high-profile personalities have been detained at Camp Crame in recent years, among them deposed President Joseph Estrada. The ongoing trial for the Maguindanao Massacre is also held in a courtroom inside the camp, where primary suspect Datu Unsay mayor Andal Ampatuan Jr. is being detained. Australian Muslim preacher Musa Cerantonio was held here at one point during his deportation from the Philippines. Former Senator Leila de Lima was also detained here from 2017 to 2023, charged with allegedly taking bribes from drug dealers. Dismissed Bamban mayor Alice Guo, who is facing charges related to her alleged links with the Philippine Offshore Gaming Operator (POGO), was also detained here in September 2024.

As of September 2024, pastor Apollo Quiboloy is detained here for charges regarding child and sexual abuse offenses.

==== Renovations ====
The camp is currently undergoing renovation, starting with the renovation of the PNP Multipurpose Hall and the camp's swimming pool. There are also plans for the construction of a multi-storey building along the EDSA side of the camp to house the administrative offices of the PNP, as well as condominium buildings and commercial establishments for the general public.

== Recognition ==
In April 2011, the post was recognized by the National Historical Commission; a marker was placed on the facility with the presence of former President Fidel Ramos.
