= Philippine Constabulary Band =

- The Philippine Constabulary Band pictured at the Louisiana Purchase Exposition in 1904.
- Active: 1901–1942; 1946-1991
- Country: Insular Government of the Philippine Islands; Commonwealth of the Philippines; Republic of the Philippines
- Allegiance: United States of America; Republic of the Philippines
- Branch: Philippine Constabulary
- Type: Military band
- Role: Public duties
- Size: 85 personnel (1909), 100 personnel (1937)
- Nickname: "Taft's Own"
- Patron: William Howard Taft

Commanders
- Notable commanders: Walter Loving

The Philippine Constabulary Band was the principal military band of the Philippine Constabulary, and later, as the Philippine Army Orchestra, of the Army of the Commonwealth of the Philippines. Between its establishment in 1901 and dissolution during World War II, it registered a reputation for musical excellence both in the Philippines and the United States, and is credited with being the first band other than the United States Marine Band to provide the musical escort to the president of the United States during a U.S. presidential inauguration. The Philippine National Police Band from Camp Crame, considers the successor to the Philippine Constabulary Band. The Philippine Army Band considers itself as a successor too.

== History ==
=== Formation and early years ===
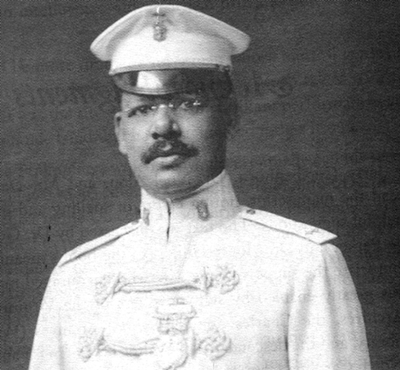
Walter Loving was the first director of the Philippine Constabulary Band.

The Philippine Constabulary Band was formed on the orders of Colonel Henry Allen, the first chief of the Philippine Constabulary. Walter Loving, a former United States Army regimental band leader who had been educated at the New England Conservatory of Music, successfully applied for the directorship of the new organization which saw its first public performance in late 1902 at the Manila Elks Club. The band's first members were recruited by Loving from community ensembles that performed in the small towns of Luzon, some of whom were former musicians in Spanish Army bands. Auditions for the ensemble were fierce; 300 clarinetists, for instance, tried out for just eight billets.

As the constabulary's only band, it was a fixture of ceremonial and social engagements at Malacañang Palace where it met with the appreciation of Governor-General of the Philippines William Howard Taft. Taft responded favorably to virtually all of Loving's appropriations requests for the band; his support of the group led to the unofficial moniker "Taft's Own."

=== St. Louis World's Fair ===
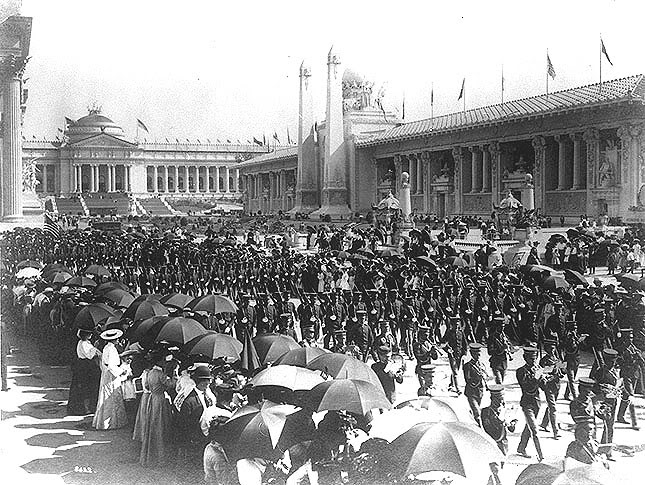
Either the Philippine Constabulary Band or the Band of the Philippine Scouts, leading the Philippine Scouts during a march-in at the 1904 Louisiana Purchase Exposition

The band's first overseas performance came just three years after its formation when it accompanied the Philippine Scouts to the Louisiana Purchase Exposition of 1904 in St. Louis, Missouri. A 4-company battalion of these Scouts, with many Filipino NCOs and enlisted among its ranks, had been sent to the fair to drill the manual of arms for President Theodore Roosevelt, who requested that the Constabulary Band play one of his favorite marches, The Garryowen, which it obliged as the president "clapped heartily." John Philip Sousa, who was in attendance at the fair, was among those who heard the Philippine Constabulary Band play and remarked, "I am simply amazed. I have rarely heard such playing."

=== 1909 U.S. presidential inauguration ===
The Philippine Constabulary Band assembles in a snowstorm prior to the 1909 U.S. presidential inaugural parade.

The Philippine Constabulary Band was the lead unit in the United States presidential inaugural parade of 1909, which saw its former patron William Howard Taft inaugurated as president of the United States. It was the first time a band other than the United States Marine Band served as the musical escort to the president of the United States. (The Band of the Philippine Scouts appeared at the 1905 inaugural of Theodore Roosevelt, but did not lead the procession.) The 1909 inaugural parade occurred in a record-setting snowstorm, and was the first time most of the bandsmen had seen snow. Afterwards, The New York Times wrote of the band's appearance:

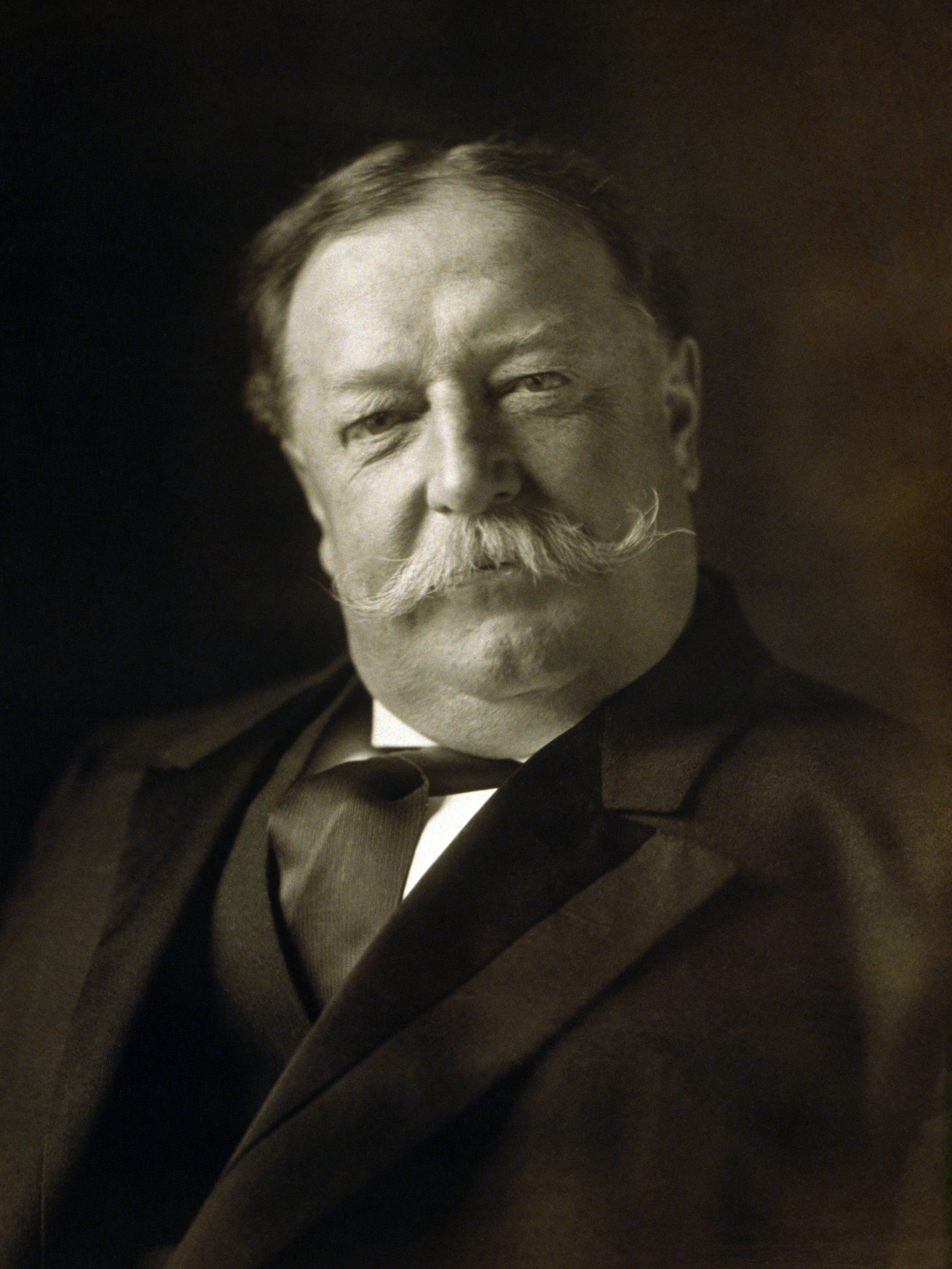
William Howard Taft, Governor-General of the Philippines, was an early patron of the Philippine Constabulary Band, which took-on the moniker "Taft's Own."

President Taft to them is still 'the big Governor,' and as an officer who is traveling with the organization expressed it last night, "the President is the only man on earth these little fellows would have tramped through that blizzard for." After their hard day's work as the musical escort for President Taft, the medical officers who have them in charge were apprehensive less some of them might develop pneumonia or other pulmonary trouble from exposure to weather so foreign to their native land.

The day after the inauguration the band was invited to perform for the president and Mrs. Taft at the White House, becoming the first band in history from outside the continental United States to perform at a White House reception. (It is also believed this may have been the first time an African-American conducted a musical performance at the White House, Loving being African-American.)

After its inaugural engagement, the band remained in the mainland United States for several months, performing at other public events. A concert at the New York Hippodrome met with a "rousing reception" in which "encore after encore" was demanded, the band finally concluding with the overture from Tannhäuser followed by the Stars and Stripes Forever. On April 17, 1909, the band returned to Washington at the request of Helen Taft to perform at the opening of West Potomac Park. Later, it appeared in Seattle at the Alaska-Yukon-Pacific Exposition to herald the arrival of President Taft for his inspection of the fairgrounds. The band then traveled to San Francisco, California, to depart for the return voyage to the Philippines. As their troopship was departing, Taft ordered his own vessel to pull alongside. Seeing the president's ship approach, the band struck up Hail to the Chief prompting Taft to shout back "goodbye, boys – I wish you a pleasant voyage!"

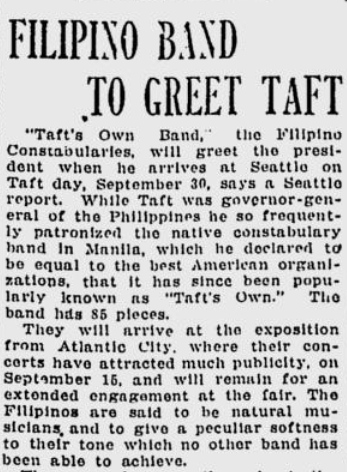
A 1909 story from the Spokane Daily Chronicle reports on the Philippine Constabulary Band's appearance at the Alaska-Yukon-Pacific Exposition in Seattle.

=== Panama Pacific International Exposition ===
The band's third major overseas performance came in 1915 when it was engaged to appear at the Panama Pacific International Exposition in San Francisco. Its reputation by then well-secured in the United States, the band remained stationed in California for nearly a year, during which time it performed 115 public concerts. During this time it again met John Philip Sousa, who on one occasion guest conducted the band and afterwards commented, "when I closed my eyes, I thought it was the United States Marine Band."

=== Changing directors ===
In 1915 Walter Loving sought, and was granted, a medical disability due to worsening tuberculosis. He was replaced as director of the band by Pedro B. Navarro. Navarro had been with the PC Band since 1902, served as Loving's assistant conductor since 1904, and took over when Loving fell ill during the 1915 Panama Pacific International Exposition. He was succeeded by José Silos in 1918. During this period the quality of the band suffered and, in 1920, Loving returned to the Philippines to rebuild the group. As part of his long-term plan to ensure the future stability of the band, he hand-picked bandsman Alfonso Fresnido to succeed him. Fresnido was sent to Ohio to study conducting at the Dana Music Institute (now the Dana School of Music at Youngstown State University) before returning to take over the band from Loving, who retired a second time in 1923.

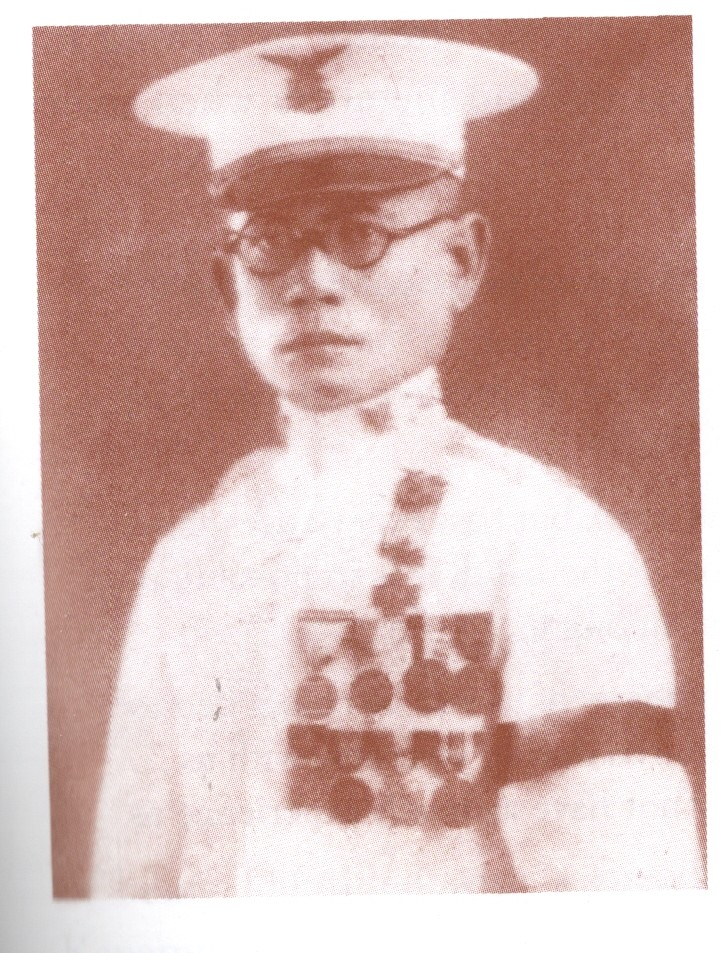
Pedro Navarro was the second director of the Philippine Constabulary Band.

=== Reorganization as Philippine Army Orchestra ===
With the establishment of the Commonwealth of the Philippines in 1935, the Constabulary Band was officially renamed the Philippine Army Orchestra and redesignated a Philippine Army unit. (After the Constabulary was reestablished, the band was not reassigned to it). Alfonso Fresnido continued as the band's director through 1937. That year, Walter Loving accepted an invitation from President Manuel L. Quezon to again take up direction of the unit at the rank of lieutenant-colonel in the Philippine Commonwealth Army and joint appointment as "Special Adviser to the President of the Philippines". The band premiered the Collectivista March (Marcha de los Collectivistas), a tribute march composed by Loving (music arranged by Msgt. Daniel Fajardo, assistant band conductor of the Philippine Constabulary Band 1933–1939) and dedicated to President Quezon, at Luneta Park later that year.

In 1939, the Philippine government sent the band to represent the commonwealth at the Golden Gate International Exposition in San Francisco. Loving retired for the third time the following year; he remained in Manila and would occasionally take up the baton as guest conductor.

=== Dissolution and legacy ===
The band ceased to exist following the Japanese occupation of the Philippines in 1942. During the course of hostilities, most of its members were killed.

After the war, which neither Loving nor Fresnido survived, the Philippine Army organized a new group, the "Philippine Army Band", as its premier musical ensemble under the direction of, at one time, Lieutenant (later, Colonel) Antonino Buenaventura, later on a National Artist for Music and dubbed the "March King of the Philippines" for his various march compositions.

The modern Philippine Army Band considers itself the successor to the Philippine Constabulary Band. According to it, "the PA Band is the fulfilment of the first American civil governor William Howard Taft’s promise of forming a Filipino military band that would be a counterpart of the famous US Marine Band." It wears the green uniforms of the army in formal occasions, as well as a historical uniform which debuted in the 1990s - rayadillo dress blue, which is worn with the straw hat for bandsmen and the pith helmet by the drum major and bandmaster, carrying on an additional tradition, that of the bandsmen of military bands and civil marching bands that played alongside men of the Philippine Revolutionary Army during much of the Philippine Revolution and the Philippine-American War. The insignia worn with the historical dress is the old official arms of the Revolutionary Army.

The PC Band itself was reconstituted postwar in 1946 under new leadership, and produced a number of LPs promoting Filipino music in the 1970s. The revived band's first bandmaster was then Captain Jose M. Campaña who led the band until 1966 when he retired from the service as full-fledged Colonel. He was honored posthumously as the father of the modern PC Band by then Chief of the Philippine Constabulary, Gen. Fidel V. Ramos. By the 70s its full dress uniforms were by then in the scarlet and gold mirroring that of the United States Marine Band but with AFP insignia and PC patches, it was also worn by guards of honour which the service provided. In 1974 the Integrated National Police Metropolitan Police Force Command Band was raised as part of the nationalization of the police departments as the official police band for Metro Manila, with its 5 divisions sporting its own bands. Today, the Philippine National Police Band, the official senior police band under the current Philippine National Police, also continues the heritage of the old PC Bands - from 1992 to 1996 it retained the uniform of the second PC Band, but with PNP rank shoulder boards/cuff markings.

== List of commanders ==
| Name | Dates of command |
|---|---|
| Walter Loving | 1902 to 1915 |
| Pedro Navarro | 1915 to 1917 |
| José Silos | 1917 to 1920 |
| Walter Loving | 1920 to 1923 |
| Alfonso Fresnido | 1923 to 1937 |
| Walter Loving | 1937 to 1940 |
| Alfonso Fresnido | 1940 to 1941 |

== Reputation and reception ==
The U.S. military periodical Army and Navy Life described the band as "one of the finest of all military bands in the world", and the Pacific Coast Musical Review considered the band "in a class by itself."

== See also ==
- Potenciano Gregorio
