= Philippine Constabulary =

Former Philippine gendarmerie force

Philippine Constabulary Hukbóng Pamayapà ng Pilipinas
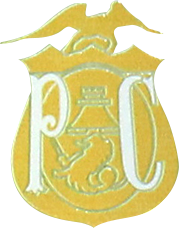
- Insignia of the Philippine Constabulary. Left (1901–1914), Right (1914–1975) and Center (1975–1991)
- Abbreviation: PC
- Motto: Always outnumbered but never outfought! Isang Bansa, Isang Diwa (One Nation, One Spirit)

Agency overview
- Formed: August 8, 1901; 125 years ago
- Preceding agency: Spanish colonial Guardia Civil
- Dissolved: January 29, 1991; 35 years ago
- Superseding agency: Philippine National Police

Jurisdictional structure
- National agency: Philippines
- Operations jurisdiction: Philippines
- Population: 90,000 (1991)
- General nature: Gendarmerie; Local civilian police
- Specialist jurisdiction: Paramilitary law enforcement, counter insurgency, riot control

Operational structure
- Headquarters: Camp Crame (1938–1991); Old Gagarin Barracks (1901–1938)

The Philippine Constabulary (PC; Filipino: Hukbóng Pamayapà ng Pilipinas, HPP; Spanish: Constabularía Filipina) was a gendarmerie-type military police force of the Philippines from 1901 to 1991, and the predecessor to the Philippine National Police. It was created by the American occupational government to replace the Spanish colonial Guardia Civil, happened on the 19th century history of the Philippines. It was the first of the four branches of the Armed Forces of the Philippines. On January 29, 1991, it was merged with the Integrated National Police to form the Philippine National Police.

== History ==
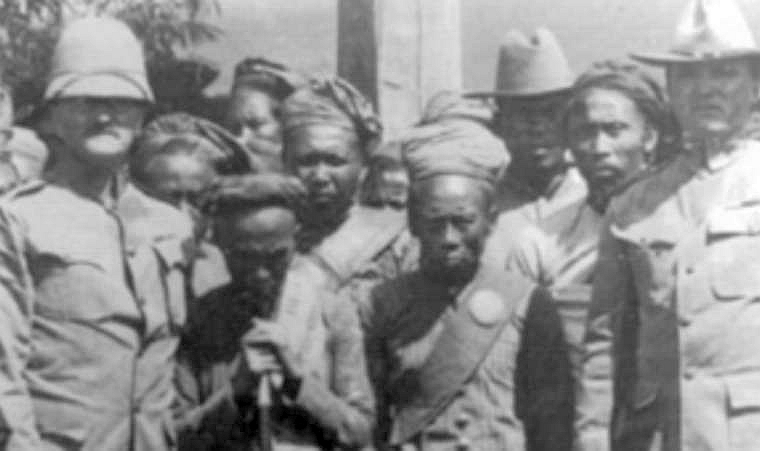
Cornelius C. Smith (far right), a recipient of the Medal of Honor, as commander of the Philippine Constabulary with Brig. Gen. John J. Pershing and Moro chieftains in 1910. Smith participated in expeditions against the Moro rebels for much of his time in the Philippines.

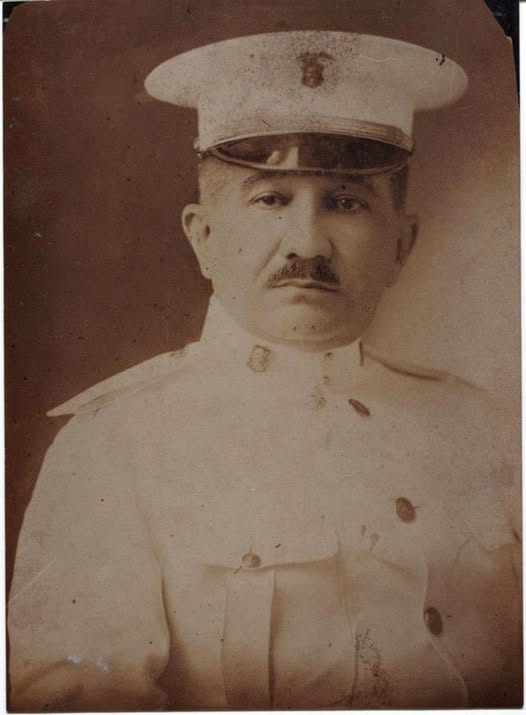
Former chief of the Philippine constabulary Rafael Crame from whom Camp Crame headquarters was named after.

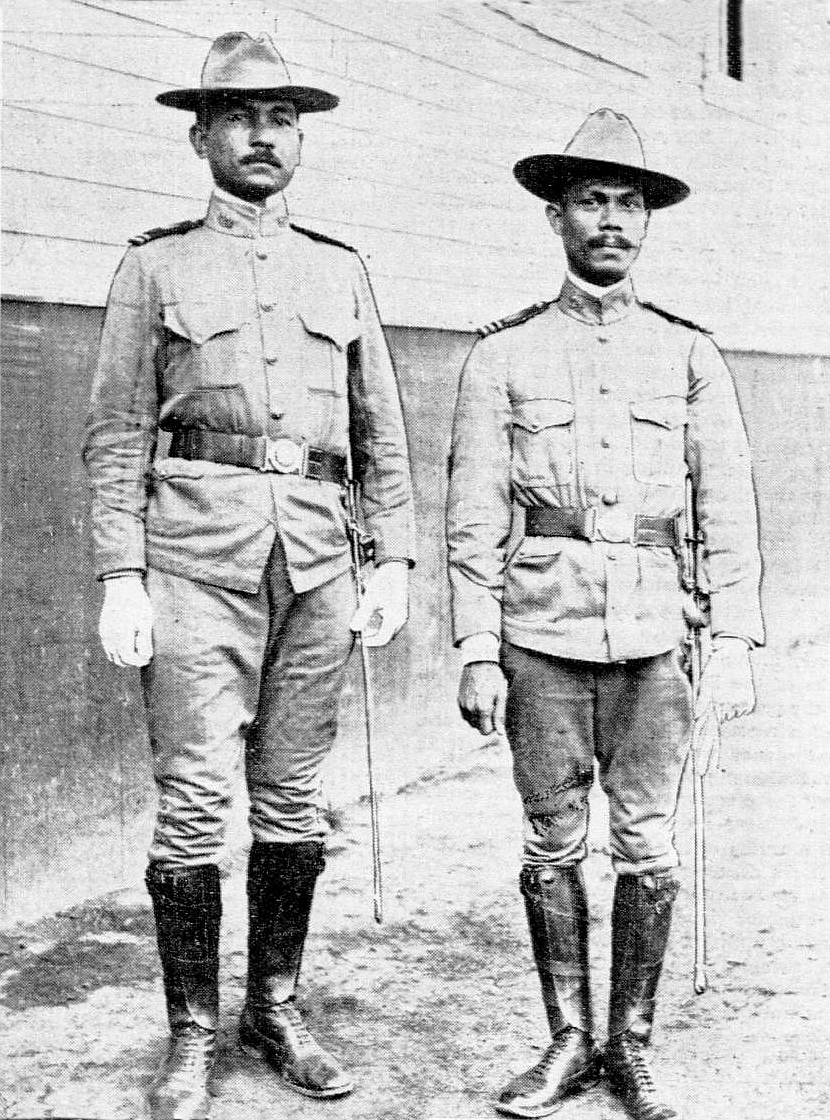
Two Constables posing for a photo in the New York Tribune in 1905.

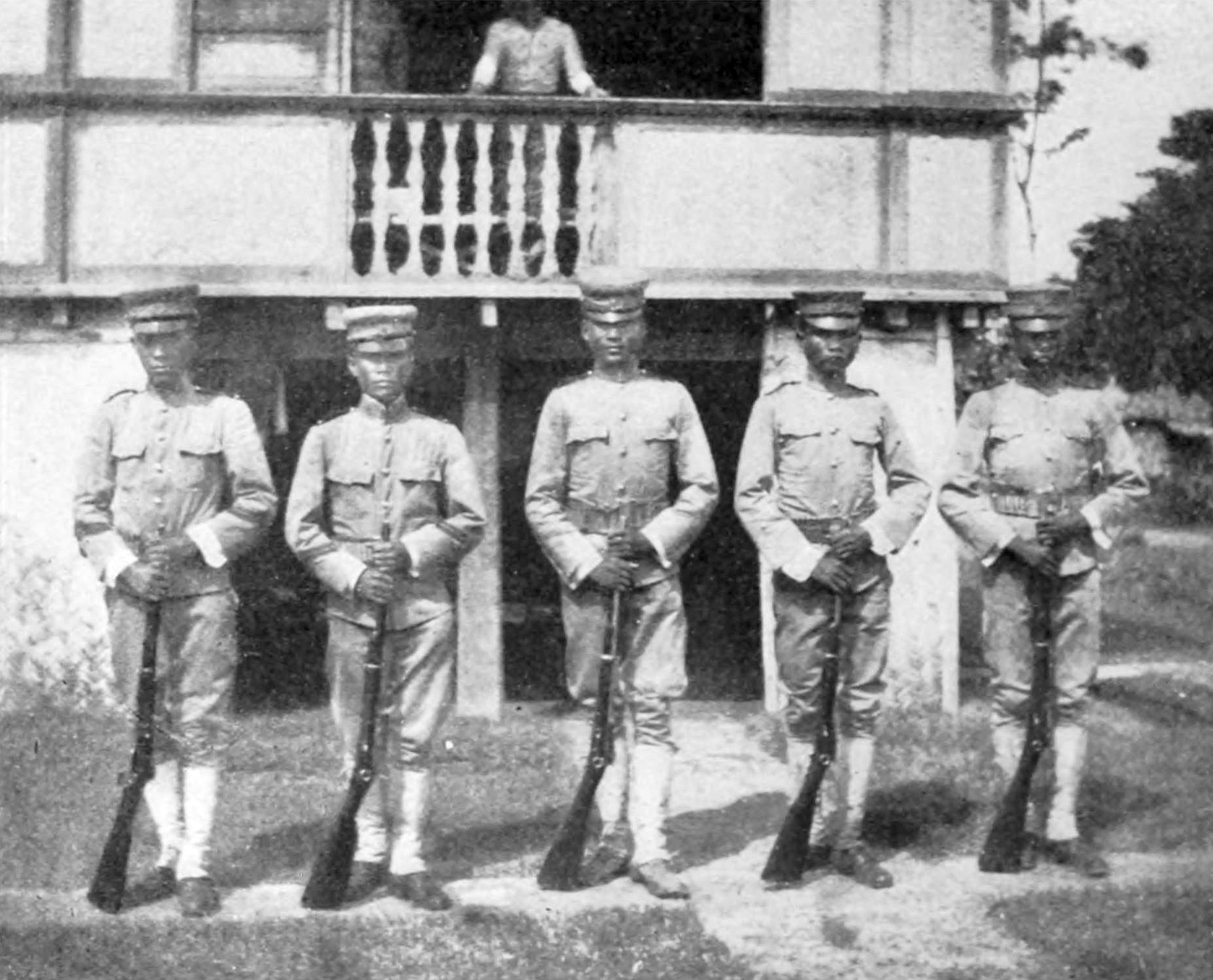
Philippine Constabulary in 1910

The Philippine Constabulary (PC) was established on August 18, 1901, under the general supervision of the civil Governor-General of the Philippines, by the authority of Act. No. 175 of the Second Philippine Commission, to maintain peace, law, and order in the various provinces of the Philippine Islands. By the end of 1901, a total of 180 officers had been commissioned.

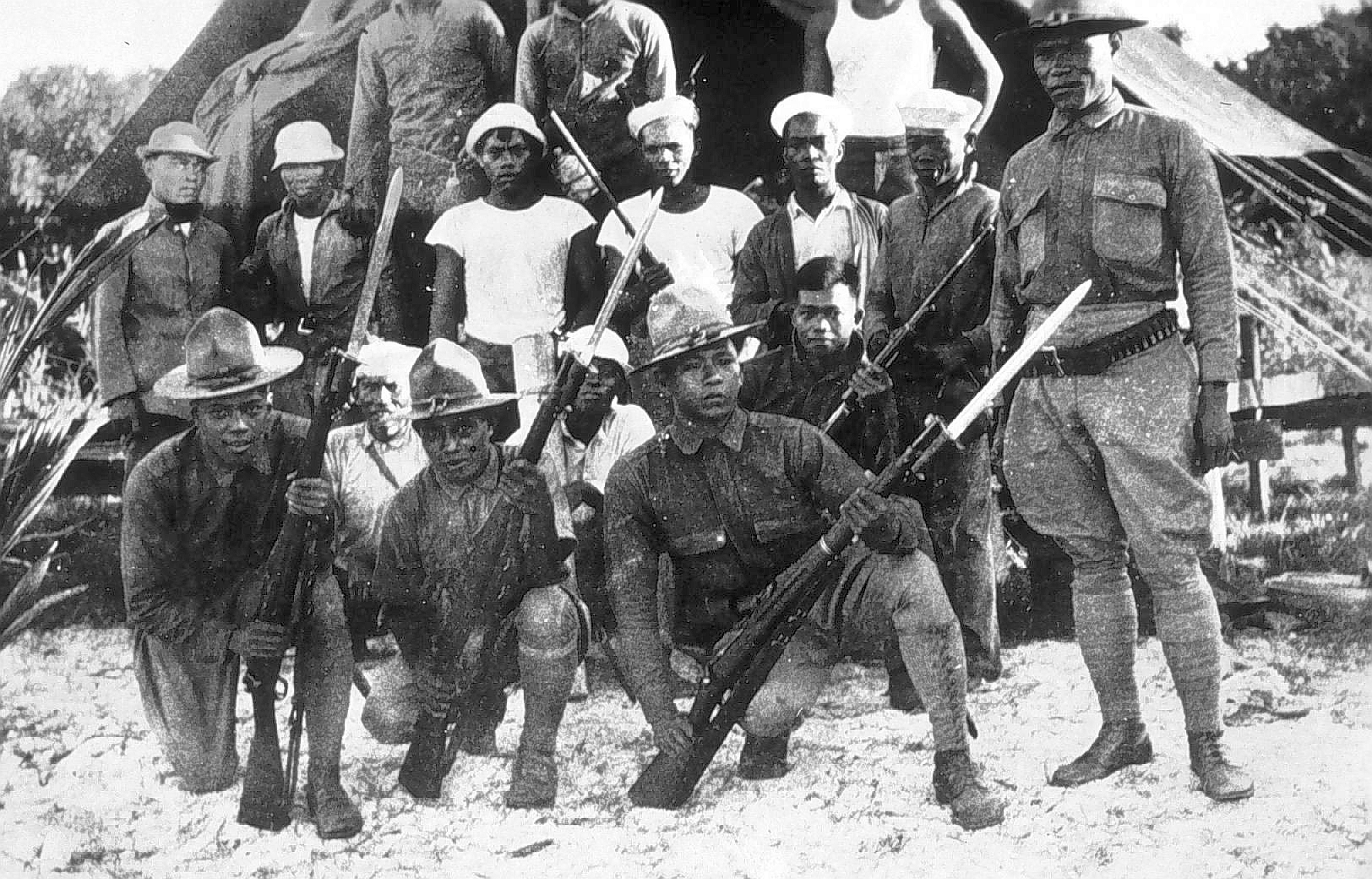
"The Philippine Constabulary guard with shore party of Hubert A. Paton. Off the Pathfinder", Philippines, 1926 from the Historic Coast & Geodetic Survey (C&GS) Collection, NOAA Photo Library.

The constabulary assisted the United States military in combating the remaining irreconcilable revolutionaries following the March 23 capture of General Emilio Aguinaldo and his April 1 pledge of allegiance to the United States. This phase of the Philippine–American War ended in Luzon by 1906, with the surrender and execution of one of its last remaining generals, Macario Sakay.

Continued disorder and brigandry prompted Governor-General William Howard Taft to maintain the PC to combat insurgents. Captain Henry T. Allen of the 6th U.S. Cavalry, a Kentucky-born graduate of West Point (Class 1882), was named as the chief of the force, and was later dubbed as the "Father of the Philippine Constabulary". With the help of four other army officers, Captains David Baker, W. Goldsborough, H. Atkinson, and J.S. Garwood, Captain Allen organized the force, trained, equipped and armed the men as best as could be done at the time. Although the bulk of the officers were recruited from among the U.S. commissioned and non-commissioned officers, two Filipinos qualified for appointment as 3rd Lieutenants during the first month of the PC: Jose Velasquez of Nueva Ecija and Felix Llorente of Manila. Llorente retired as a colonel in 1921 while Velasquez retired as major in 1927.

The Philippine Constabulary Band was formed on October 15, 1902, by Colonel Walter Loving upon the instructions of Governor-General Taft, who was known as a music lover. The 86-piece band toured the United States to great acclaim, leading the parade in Washington, D.C. to celebrate Taft's 1909 presidential inauguration, and performing at the 1904 Louisiana Purchase Exposition and the 1915 World's Fair. Before the First World War, the PC Band would serve as a source of national pride.

=== Philippine Military Academy ===
A school for the constabulary was established on February 17, 1905, at the Santa Lucia barracks in Intramuros. In 1908, the school was transferred to Baguio. In 1915 the school was renamed Academy for Officers of the Philippine Constabulary. In 1928, the school was renamed the Philippine Constabulary Academy. When the Philippine Army was created in 1936, the institution became the Philippine Military Academy. The school is the main source of regular officers of the Armed Forces of the Philippines (AFP), which before 1991 included those of the Philippine Constabulary.

=== Camp Crame ===
In 1935, a large tract of land was acquired in New Manila Heights, now part of Quezon City. It was given by the City of Manila government in exchange for the old Gagalangin barracks compound in Tondo. Part of this tract became Camp Crame, named after Brigadier General Rafael Cramé of Rizal Province who became the first Filipino appointed Chief of the Constabulary on December 17, 1917. Other parts of the tract became Camp Murphy (now Camp Aguinaldo), and Zablan Field, site the Philippine Constabulary Air Corps (PCAC).

=== Reorganized as a military organization ===
Under the National Defense Act of 1935, the PC became the backbone of the Philippine Army, later re-established after World War II and was known as both the Philippine Constabulary and as the Military Police Command in 1946. It consisted of soldiers trained in military police duties with nationwide jurisdiction.

The move to abolish the national police force and to make it a nucleus of a Philippine Army got underway when the Army of the Philippines was created in 1936. Thus, the transfer of the PC to the regular force of the new military organization was effected under the provisions of Sec. 18 of the National Defense Act, and pursuant to Executive Order No. 11 of President Manuel L. Quezon dated January 11, 1936. The Constabulary was inactivated on this date and was known as the Constabulary Division, Philippine Army. The PC was not gone but got submerged in a bigger organization. Thereafter, the insular police duties, formally reposed in the PC, were discharged by a "State Police" created by Commonwealth Act No. 88 dated October 26, 1936.

After turning over the former Constabulary duties to a State Police, which proved to be short-lived and unsuccessful, the Constabulary was revived as a military police force on June 23, 1938, by Commonwealth Act No. 343. By operation of the CA 343, the State Police was abolished and its military police duties reverted to the PC. President Quezon himself recommended to the National Assembly that the State Police be abolished and in its place the PC was to be reconstituted into a separate organization, distinct and divorced from the Philippine Army, which was for "national defense".

The PC once again existed as an independent force retaining all duties in maintaining peace and order and protection of life and property. One of the most significant provisions of the law re-creating it was that which provided that officers and enlisted men detached from the army and transferred to the PC shall retain their identity and legal rights and obligations as officers and enlisted men of the army; that the president may, at his discretion, transfer at any time any officer or enlisted man to and from the army to the Constabulary, respectively; and that all services performed in the Constabulary shall count for all legal purposes as military service. Thus, began the linear roster of officers for both the Constabulary and the Armed forces up until the PC was merged with the Integrated National Police in 1991.

=== World War II ===
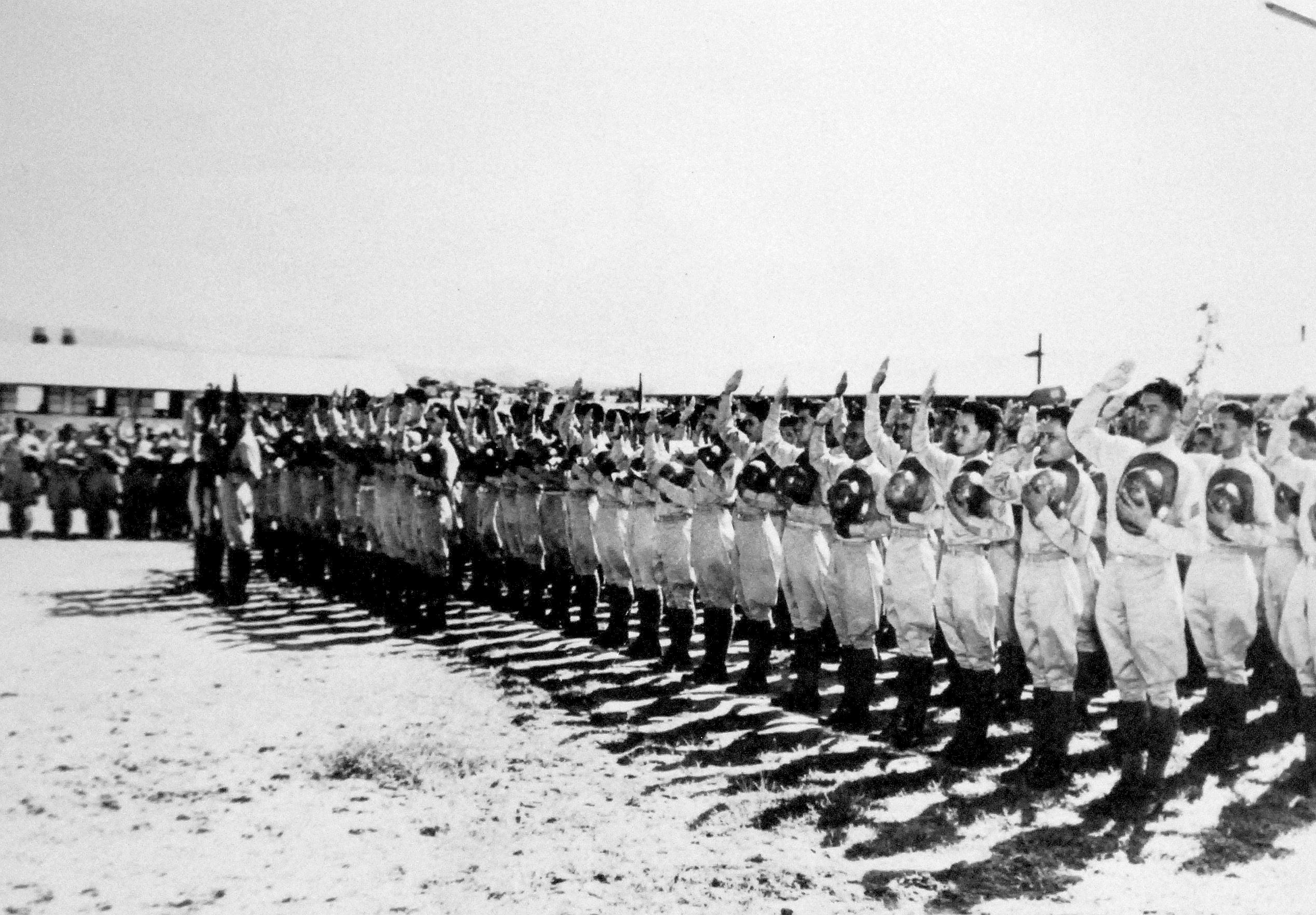
Members of the First Regiment swearing to the U.S. flag and to the cause of the United Nations. February or March 1942.

In May 1941, President Franklin D. Roosevelt proclaimed a state of emergency in the continental United States and all American overseas possessions including the Philippines. With the organization of the United States Army Forces in the Far East in July, the Philippine Commonwealth Army and the Constabulary prepared their combat units. The PC was inducted to the USAFFE and was formed into three infantry regiments for participation in national defense.

On October 15, the 1st PC Regiment was inducted into the USAFFE by Brig, Gen. George M. Parker in Camp Crame, after which it was moved to the Balara cantonment area in Quezon City, where the men were trained as a combat team on the regimental level.

The 2nd and 3rd Regiments were inducted into the USAFFE on November 17 and December 12, respectively. The 1st and the 2nd were assigned to safeguard public utilities vital to the survival of the growing population of the City of Greater Manila.

War broke out on December 8, 1941. The two PC regiments less the 2nd Battalion of the 1st which was ordered to proceed to Bataan immediately, were assigned in Manila to arrest all aliens believed to be sympathetic with the enemy. In addition, these units were ordered to safeguard centers of communication and all public utilities in the city and of securing the metropolitan area against subversive elements. Soon, a protective cordon around Manila was formed by units of the two PC regiments.

By January 1942, most of the "constables" were in the Bataan peninsula with other Fil-American troops. "On Bataan and Corregidor, in Aparri, Lingayen and Atimonan, everywhere in the islands were the invaders dread to set foot, Constabulary troops distinguished themselves in action against overwhelming odds."

On December 29, the 4th PC Regiment was activated and constituted by PC units from the provinces of Bataan, Bulacan, Nueva Ecija, Pampanga, Pangasinan, Tarlac, and Zambales. Two days later, the regiment was ordered to Bataan.

To prevent the unnecessary slaughter of his war-weary troops, Maj. General Edward P. King Jr., the commanding officer of the Southern Luzon Force, negotiated with the Japanese High Command the surrender of the Bataan-based Filipino American troops. Bataan fell on April 9, 1942, and thousands of Filipino-American servicemen who had defended it became prisoners of war. A large number of Constabulary men died in the battle and in the infamous Bataan Death March. Many more died at the concentration camp in Capas, Tarlac.

The Philippines was liberated late in 1944 and early in 1945. Thereafter, the problem of restoring peace and order from the general chaos and disorder arising from the war came up. The Constabulary went on active service with the Philippine Commonwealth Army under President Sergio Osmeña's Executive Order 21, dated October 28, 1944. In the reorganization, that followed, the Military Police Command (MPC), USAFFE, was created pursuant to USAFFE General Orders No. 50 Another Order, General Orders No. 51 dated July 7, 1945, redesignated the organization as MPC, AFWESPAC.

=== Bureau of Constabulary ===
After the fall of Manila, the Japanese established the Bureau of Constabulary as the Filipino national police force using former officers from the Philippine Constabulary. Jose de los Reyes was appointed director on February 5, 1943. He was succeeded by Guillermo B. Francisco on April 11, 1943, and Paulino Santos in August 1944.

According to Robert Lapham, an American officer who had headed to the jungles to fight instead of obeying General MacArthur's order to surrender and had become a guerrilla commander, constabulary chief Gen. Guillermo Francisco had been "de-Americanized" by the Japanese after the surrender of Bataan, after which, they "half trusted him to do their will". Francisco and his men pursued "bandits and cut-throats, which was good in itself and which allowed them to look good to their Japanese overlords, but it was known among many of his officers and some outsiders as well that he and most of his men were just waiting for an opportune time to change sides."

During the Japanese occupation, the enemy, through the use of force and threats, organized their version of the Philippine Constabulary which they called the Bureau of Constabulary; it was later renamed to match the pre-war Constabulary with the creation of the Second Republic. It was armed with small arms only such as the M1917 Enfield, the .450 British Bulldog revolver, and the Colt Police Positive. A handful of former PC officers and men were rounded up and forced to work with this outfit, with the threat that their loved ones would be harmed; majority of the men who escaped managed to find their way into the hills where they joined the resistance movement until liberation came in 1944.

It is a fact that much of the stigma that haunted the PC was the result of the establishment by the Japanese of their version of the Constabulary. Many had the wrong impression that the occupation Constabulary was the same force as that of the pre-war organization.

=== Post war era ===
A major revamp in the Armed Forces was effected on March 30, 1950, when President Elpidio Quirino issued Executive Order No. 308 which called for the merger of the Philippine Constabulary with the Armed Forces, making it one more major service command. This was the second time the PC returned to a military force. Due to the unstable peace and order conditions existing in the countrysides brought about by the resurgence of the Hukbalahap (Huk) which require more personnel strength, the Philippine Army was called upon to assist in the pacification drive with the employment of its combat arms – the Battalion Combat Teams or BCTs, with PC men absorbed by the BCTs. It was under E.O. 308 and according to Administrative Order No. 113, dated April 1, 1950, the PC was formally merged with the Armed Forces of the Philippines; the merger was completed on July 27, the same year. 12,000 men from the MPC to the PC.

Under the E.O., the power of executive supervision and all authority and duties exercised by the Secretary of Interior concerning the PC or its members were transferred to and exercised by the Secretary of National Defense. With the appointment, on American advice, of former USAFFE guerilla Rep. Ramon Magsaysay as Secretary of National Defense in September 1950 and the subsequent appropriation by Congress of more funds for the drive against the Communist movement in the Philippines, more BCTs were formed.

The delineation of the missions of the then four major services – Philippine Army, Philippine Constabulary, Philippine Navy, and Philippine Air Force – were underlined by EO No. 389 dated December 23, 1950, which abolished the Philippine Service Command and the Philippine Ground Force. Headquarters Armed Forces of the Philippines became known as "General Headquarters, Armed Forces of the Philippines"; while General Headquarters, Philippine Constabulary became known as "Headquarters, Philippine Constabulary", the nomenclature it had in the prewar years. Also, the major commands were abolished and in their places were activated the four major services. As defined in Executive Order (E.O.) No. 389, the main function of the PC was maintaining peace and order within the country and to be the country's national police force even though it was a branch then of the military.

In the reorganization that followed, the four military areas created under EO No. 94, series 1947, were not altered substantially but were nevertheless placed under the administrative and operational control of the AFP General Headquarters.

=== Marcos to martial law era ===
President Ferdinand Marcos sought to have a strong personal influence over the Armed Forces, including the PC, as soon as he became president in 1965, holding on to the portfolio of defense secretary in the first thirteen months of his presidency to develop what scholars have noted to be "a patronage system within the defense establishment." The portfolio afforded him direct interaction with the AFP's leadership, and to have a hand in the AFP's day-to-day operationalization. He also created Metropolitan Command (MetroCom) on July 14,1967 to operate in the City of Manila, Quezon City, Caloocan and Pasay, and in the municipalities of Las Piñas, Malabon, Marikina, Makati, Mandaluyong, Navotas, Parañaque, Pasig, Pateros, San Juan, and Taguig.

Upon the declaration of Martial Law in 1972, Marcos used the AFP as what the Davide Commission Report would later call his "martial law implementor," and "one of the vital supports of the regime." Upon the announcement of Martial Law in 1972, one of their earliest tasks was that of quickly arresting and containing Marcos' political opponents. The AFP was given many other functions, including assisting in the implementation of price controls imposed on key products like corn and rice, enforcing the rules of the national corn procurement program, assisting in the collection of rural and government bank loans, implementing the agrarian reform law, and various police functions such as collecting unlicensed firearms and enforcing curfews, and suppressing strikes, rallies, and other demonstrations.

In 1975, the PC officially integrated the nation's municipal and city police, fire and penitentiary services, which from 1974 onward formed the Integrated National Police, into the service, thus the PC became the Philippine Constabulary-Integrated National Police (PC-INP), as per the provisions of Presidential Decree 765, enacted on August 8 the same year, that formally fused the two services into one joint service, with joint command resting with the Chief of the PC.

Civilian and military historians alike agree that "human rights abuses by the troops became rampant" during the Marcos administration, as documented by international monitoring entities such as Amnesty International. Units often specifically cited in these reported incidents include the Metrocom Intelligence and Security Group, and the 5th Constabulary Security Unit (5CSU) which were under the Philippine Constabulary, as well as the Intelligence Service of the Armed Forces of the Philippines (ISAFP), the Presidential Security Unit, and the National Intelligence and Security Agency (NISA) were also accused of aiding these activities. Aside from human rights abuses, these units were also accused of hounding media entities, corporate management, and opposition groups with threats, intimidation, and violence.

Marcos' hold on power was effectively broken once enough of the Military withdrew their support from him in February 1986.

=== Post-Marcos era and dissolution ===
The need to assert civilian control of the military was a reform agenda which began being addressed almost as soon as Ferdinand Marcos was deposed by the 1986 People Power Revolution; within a year of Marcos' ouster, the 1987 Constitution of the Philippines enshrined the principle of civilian supremacy over the military. After the various coup attempts of the 1980s, the recommendations of the Davide Commission included the dissolution of the Philippine Constabulary as a service under the AFP. It was abolished in the early 1990s in a merger with the Integrated National Police.

In 1991, it was determined that a new civilian Philippine National Police was to be formed by merging the Integrated National Police into the Philippine Constabulary, with the PC forming the basis as it had the more developed infrastructure. The PC was then removed from the Ministry of National Defense and eventually civilianized, as part of the Department of the Interior and Local Government, through attrition and recruitment of new personnel.

In 2017, President Rodrigo Duterte contemplated reviving the Constabulary to augment the manpower of the Philippine Drug Enforcement Agency, with presidential spokesperson Ernesto Abella announcing the planned revival. This was never carried out after Duterte's term ended.

== Missions and duties ==
The PC's missions were as follows:

1. To preserve peace and order and enforce the law throughout the country and also to arrest law violators and those who will violate such laws;
2. Inspectional supervision over, and undertake the training of, municipal and city level police forces, fire departments, and jail services;
3. To assist civil government and semi-government agencies in the accomplishment of their missions;
4. To perform home defense in rear areas and such other services as the chief of staff, AFP may direct.

The PC covered a very extensive range of diversified missions that through the years did not fall under its primary responsibilities. By express provision of law, the PC enforced the motor vehicle law, fishing and games law, the alien law for registration and fingerprinting, and anti-dummy law, and the nationalization of retail trade law. By direction of the president, it enforced the tenancy law, the law on scrap metal, iron and gold, a ban on slaughter of water buffalo or carabao, and other laws. By deputation, it enforced the immigration law, customs law, forestry law, quarantine law, election law, public service law, and amusement law and weight and standards on rice. As a civic function, it performed in conjunction with the Department of Social Welfare and Development (DSWD) and the Red Cross disaster relief operations during natural calamities and the like, alongside other organizations in later years. The security of VIPs was a routine requirement for the constabulary.

== Organization ==
The chief of the Philippine Constabulary was, from 1975 onward, also the director-general of the Integrated National Police (the municipal police, fire, and jail force for the larger towns and cities).

The PC was organized on similar lines to the army, and consisted of a General Staff located at its General Headquarters at Camp Crame, Manila, and 12 Regional Commands (under a regional director) consisting of 104 Provincial Commands (under a Provincial Commander); these controlled the 450 PC Companies which performed all the day-to-day military police work.

The Regions were based on the country's political regions and directly controlled the various Highway Patrol, Rangers, and investigative groups.

The PC Regions would be later grouped into 4 PC Field Units or Command Zones (PCZs), each of which was headed by a Zone Commander (provinces are as of 1990):

- IPCZ – Abra, Aurora, Bataan, Batanes, Benguet, Bulacan, Cagayan, Ifugao, Ilocos Norte, Ilocos Sur, Isabela, Kalinga-Apayao, La Union, Mt. Province, Nueva Ecija, Pampanga, Pangasinan, Tarlac and Zambales
- IIPCZ – Albay, Batangas, Camarines Norte, Camarines Sur, Catanduanes, Cavite, Laguna, Marinduque, Mindoro Occidental, Mindoro Oriental, Palawan, Quezon, Rizal and Sorsogon
- IIIPCZ – Aklan, Antique, Bohol, Capiz, Cebu, Iloilo, Leyte and Southern Leyte, Masbate, Negros Occidental, Negros Oriental, Romblon, Samar, Eastern Samar and Northern Samar and Siquijor
- IVPCZ – Agusan del Norte, Agusan del Sur, Basilan, Bukidnon, Camiguin, Cotabato, Davao del Norte, Davao del Sur, Davao Oriental, Lanao del Norte, Lanao del Sur, Misamis Occidental, Misamis Oriental, Sulu, Surigao del Norte, Surigao del Sur, South Cotabato, Sultan Kudarat, Tawi-Tawi, Zamboanga del Norte and Zamboanga del Sur

The Metropolitan Command (METROCOM) who supervises the Metro Manila region is separated from the regional PC Zones (PCZs).

=== Ranks ===
Ranks of the PC followed those first of the United States Army and later on those used by the Armed Forces of the Philippines.

Originally the PC used the ranks and insignia of the United States Army upon its foundation and in its latter years it was more modelled on Philippine Army but with branch-specific shoulder board and sleeve insignia.

==== Officers ====
Philippine Constabulary Rank (1950–1991)
General¹
Lieutenant General²
Major General
Brigadier General
Colonel
Lieutenant Colonel
Major
Captain
First Lieutenant
Second Lieutenant

¹ – Can be attained if a PC officer was appointed as Chief of Staff, AFP

² – Can be attained if a PC officer was appointed as Vice Chief of Staff, AFP

==== Enlisted constables and NCOs ====
- Master Sergeant
- Technical Sergeant
- Staff Sergeant
- Sergeant
- Constable 1st Class
- Constable 2nd Class
- Constable

=== Headquarters organization ===
Headquarters Directorates:

1. Directorate for Personnel
2. Directorate for Human Resource and Doctrine Development
3. Directorate for Logistics,
4. Directorate for Research and Development
5. Directorate for Comptrollership,
6. Directorate for Plans,
7. Directorate for Police-Community Relations,
8. Directorate for Investigation and
9. Directorate for Special Staff

The Philippine Constabulary Rangers, or PC Rangers, were independent light infantry companies which served as a counter-insurgency force similar to United States Army Rangers and were organized into 12 large regional companies.

Constabulary Headquarters directly controlled many other services needed at a national level such as the Special Action Force, Central Crime Laboratory, White Collar Crime Group, and Office of Special Investigations (which was a counter-intelligence group).

The Constabulary also maintained the following units:

- PC/INP Air Unit
- Constabulary Boat Service
- Crime and Forensic Labs
- National Constabulary Investigations Service which acted in a similar way to the FBI before the NBI was reformed.
