= Mary "Rosebud" Ong =

Filipina Triad member and undercover agent

- Ong in the late 1990's
- Born: Mary Ong; 1 September 1956 (age 70); Binondo, Manila, Philippines
- Other names: Rosebud; Tai Ka Tse; Mary Ong-Gaba; Lily Cheung; Lily Wong; Baby Tsina; Ana Valera; Trinidad Tabora; Dolores Ong
- Occupations: financial services official; money launderer; police informant
- Years active: 1979 to 2000
- Employers: Binondo Central Bank; Hong Kong Police Force; Philippine National Police; Presidential Anti-Organized Crime Commission
- Allegiance: 14K Triad
- Criminal charges: organized crime, money laundering, arms trafficking, drug trafficking, kidnapping, fraud

Mary Ong (born 1 September 1956) is a Filipina former 14K Triad "Big Sister" (Cantonese: 大家姐) and money launderer who worked as an informant to the Hong Kong Police Force in the 1980s before being recruited as a Philippine National Police undercover agent by Ping Lacson in 1993, where she operated under the codename "Rosebud". Ong later entered the witness protection program after agreeing to testify against Lacson about his alleged involvement in crimes such as the 1998 Manila PAOCTF kidnap-for-ransom incident. Ong would go onto testify at a series of sensational Philippine Senate hearings to accuse senior PNP officers of trafficking multi-ton shipments of methamphetamine while running a kidnap-for-ransom scheme that resulted in several summary executions, whereas Ong was herself accused of being a rogue agent playing both sides and afterwards seeking immunity from prosecution for her own involvement in serious organised crime as well as protection from rival drug traffickers she had double crossed. Ong's unprecedented whistleblowing helped to expose corruption in the highest echelons of the Philippine government, with her testimony directly negatively affecting Lacson's approval rating and the resulting outcome of the 2004 Philippine presidential election.

== Early life ==
Mary Ong was born to an ethnic Chinese-Filipino ("Tsinoy") family in the Binondo district of Manila. Ong was the second child of Buan Ong and Ogay Lee Chua, who both migrated from mainland China to the Philippines as teenagers. Her father Buan ran an auto parts store from the ground floor of their house. Raised as a Catholic, Ong was noted as being a bright student at the Immaculate Conception Academy of Manila with a gift for bookkeeping. After leaving school, Ong obtained a MBA from the University of Santo Tomas and in 1979 started a decades long career in the Binondo Central Bank. Ong's main role with Binondo Central Bank was to reconcile transnational US dollar transactions during an era of Marcos dictatorship enforced foreign exchange controls, which allowed her to cultivate connections while on business trips to British Hong Kong and the wider Pearl River Delta region.

== Criminal career ==
Between 1979 and 1991, Ong laundered proceeds of crime worth billions of US dollars for various Triad syndicates in British Hong Kong, as well as smuggling firearms for 14K Triad members based out of the Hotel Lisboa in Portuguese Macau. Ong was a designated Triad "Big Sister" who ran her own crew of money mules between Hong Kong and Manila. Ong also worked as an informant for the Royal Hong Kong Police Narcotics Bureau in the 1980s.

In September 1992, Ong was arrested on drug trafficking charges in the Philippines for the attempted importation from Hong Kong via Ninoy Aquino International Airport of 22 kilograms of methamphetamine, and facing a potential death sentence agreed to become an undercover agent for then senior police official Ping Lacson the following year in return for her release from pre-trial detention. Ong would later claim Lacson specifically hired her as she could speak fluent Cantonese, Mandarin Chinese and Hokkien from her time working throughout East Asia as a Binondo Central Bank official. The drug trafficking charges against Ong were eventually dropped after the prosecution's chief witness and his lawyer were shot dead outside the Magallanes Shopping Center in Makati by Lacson associate Reynaldo Berroya.

Officially an agent of the Presidential Anti-Organized Crime Task Force, Ong would go onto act as an agent provocateur to set up various 14K Triad drug traffickers operating out of Metro Manila in sting operations organized by the Philippine National Police for a flat fee of $US40,000 per operation. Although the reward money allowed her to live an extravagant life and rent a mansion in the exclusive Greenhills district, Ong later discovered that her fees came from illegal sources such as rival traffickers wanting to get rid of a competitor, seized methamphetamine that had been resold by corrupt police officers, and ransoms paid for the individuals arrested in the stings. Ong's secondary role within the PAOCTF was to translate recorded wiretap conversations between various Hong Konger Triads. After purportedly witnessing PNP Superintendent John Campos (who was both her agent handler and common-law husband) personally torturing kidnap victims at a vacant condominium unit she owned on Roxas Boulevard, Ong became disillusioned with her role as a PAOCTF agent and decided to become a whistleblower on corruption within the PNP, which culminated in her testifying before the Philippine Senate Committee on Public Order and Dangerous Drugs.

Ong also claimed her relationship with Campos, who was 10 years her junior, had started to break down after he became addicted to the drugs he sized during police stings, and he was increasingly committing acts of domestic violence while high on methamphetamine. The final straw for Ong came in late May 1999 when as the result of a turf war she was abducted and blindfolded by rouge National Bureau of Investigation agent Martin Soriano, who was allegedly a drug trafficking rival of Campos, from Quezon City while attempting to retrieve money for a drug deal, and after begging for her life having being beaten she was later dumped in a rural area of San Mateo, Rizal. NBI agent Soriano was eventually sentenced to life in prison for the 2005 kidnapping of Carolyn Guillen from the Ambassador Hotel in Malate, Manila.

== Whistleblower ==
In July 2000, a PNP communiqué announced that PAOCTF operatives had reduced kidnapping cases by 29 percent, rescued 94 victims, arrested 73 perpetrators, and prosecuted 125 suspects in the previous 2 years. It also said 30 kidnapping incidents were thwarted and approximately ₱13.7 million in ransom money was recovered by the PAOCTF task force nationwide. However, Ong proceeded to make several claims regarding corruption in the PNP, narrating how Lacson had allegedly directed senior officer Francisco Villaroman to kidnap and then extort several Hong Konger suspected drug traffickers in the late 1990's. Ong first appeared anonymously in silhouette during a TV news interview to accuse Lacson of engaging in criminality during his time as PAOCTF commanding officer. In response to Lacson's challenge to publicly accuse him, Ong held a press conference on 25 November 2000 to repeat her accusations, also revealing that the Archbishop of Manila Jaime Sin had offered her sanctuary after senior PNP officer Reynaldo Acop had sent her death threats in relation to her whistleblowing.

In January 2001, Ong submitted to the Office of the Ombudsman a 22 page length sworn statement against high-ranking PNP officials such as Ping Lacson and his then deputy Michael Ray Aquino, alleging their involvement in drug trafficking, kidnapping for ransom and murder. The sworn statement specifically named Lacson, with Reynaldo Acop and John Campos his alleged accomplices, as the "principal by inducement" regarding the May 1998 purchase and subsequent distribution of 15 kilograms of methamphetamine worth ₱4.5 million. In March 2001, the National Bureau of Investigation recommended criminal charges be filed against Lacson and his co-accused for serious crimes such as:

- the kidnapping for ransom of
  - Zeng Jia Xuan
  - Hong Zhen Quiao
  - Zeng Kang Pang
  - James Wong
- the kidnapping for ransom and subsequent murder of
  - Chong Hiu Ming
  - Wong Kam Chong

In April 2001, in response to the NBI report and the earlier implication of PAOCTF members in the Dacer–Corbito double murder case, the PAOCTF was abolished by President Gloria Macapagal Arroyo's Executive Order #10. In May 2001, Lacson and 13 other individuals were subpoenaed by the Philippines Department of Justice to answer charges related to the kidnapping and murder of individuals identified in the earlier NBI investigation. In early August 2001, Ong travelled to mainland China with NBI director Samuel Fiji in an effort to convince an alleged teenaged former PAOCTF kidnap victim living in Xiamen to return to Manila and testify against Lacson's subordinates. In mid-August 2001, Ong's personal bodyguard Dominador "Teng" Bartolata was ambushed outside a gas station in Greenhills, San Juan by a team of PNP officers and assaulted by John Campos in an effort to make him reveal the safehouse Ong and her children were hiding in.

=== Philippine Senate hearings ===
At a late August 2001 Senate of the Philippines hearing on illegal drug trafficking, Ong asserted that Ping Lacson virtually turned the PNP headquarters at Camp Crame into the national distribution center for narcotics, claiming that approximately 8,000 kilograms of methamphetamine purchased from Hong Kong based Triads were distributed on a monthly basis by corrupt police officers in the late 1990s. Ong testified that she often flew out to Hong Kong to negotiate major drug deals between Triad bosses and rouge PNP officers, producing an airline manifest as evidence that Lacson traveled to Hong Kong in the company of fugitive Superintendent Michael Ray Aquino at relevant times. Ong estimated the annual income from narcotics sales by Camp Crame based officers to be ₱96 billion, of which ₱72 billion (equivalent at the time to approximately $1.8 billion US dollars) was retained by senior police officers and the rest wired to the suppliers in Hong Kong. Ong claimed all payments were made through Binondo Central Bank, and that the profits were split between Lacson, Superintendent John Campos, and Chief Superintendent Reynaldo Acop.

As per Ongs telling, on one occasion Superintendent Francisco Roman gave her ₱2 million in cash as a down payment for drugs, which she routed via Binondo Central Bank to suppliers in Hong Kong. The narcotics were thereafter handed over in hotel carpark in Malate, after which they were taken to Camp Crame and passed onto ethnic Chinese detainees being held on illegal drug charges to sell on the officer's behalf. Ong clarified that the detainees were drug wholesalers who sold the narcotics over the phone to their customers, and PNP officers would then deliver the individual consignments. Ong's allegations were partially corroborated by witness Rebecca Agana, who testified to having been coerced into selling 300 grams of methamphetamine on behalf of Camp Crame police officers after her arrest by anti-narcotics agents in 1998, in addition to witness PNP Officer Mabini Rosale, who testified to being ordered by Campos to transport several consignments of methamphetamine totalling 20 kilograms to San Pedro, Laguna based PNP officer Francis Duran for further distribution.

Ong testifying in September 2001 at the Philippine Anti-Graft Court regarding the kidnapping of Chinese nationals by rouge PNP officers

=== Philippine Anti-Graft Court hearings ===
Ong also testified in September 2001 at the Philippine Anti-Graft Court that in December 1998 she set up a number of alleged 14K Triad members (Lu Shao Min, Wang Jin Luan, Jin Plao Wang Chua, Li Jiaz Hu, Ah Chun, and Eduardo Ling Hing Ong) to be arrested in a PNP sting operation in an apartment at 62 Maria Clara Street in Quezon City, after which PNP Chief Superintendent Reynaldo Acop directed her to travel to Hong Kong to negotiate a ransom of ₱3 million and 10 kilograms of methamphetamine with senior Triad member Chong Hui Ming for their release. The men had been taken into custody after 30 grams of methamphetamine and several unlicensed firearms were discovered in their apartment.Ong was able to present records of phone calls between herself, PAOCTF members Superintendent Francisco Villaroman and Superintendent John Campos on relevant dates to back up her claims of negotiations in Hong Kong, while her brother Peter Ong, who acted as her chauffeur, testified to personally witnessing the surveillance of suspected drug traffickers in Manila and the subsequent PNP arrest operations. After the ransom and 10 kgs of drugs were allegedly handed over, three of the group (Eduardo Hong Ling Ong, Ah Chun, Li Jiaz Hu) were released after posting bail, and their criminal case was eventually dismissed a few months later after the arresting officers failed to appear in court for the preliminary hearing.

Witness Remus Garganera backed up Ong's testimony by claiming to have accompanied John Campos when ₱3 million was withdrawn from a Metrobank branch on Shaw Boulevard, after which they brought the money to Camp Vicente Lim, where the cash was split up between Acop, Villaroman, and the rest of the PAOCTF team. Garganera further claimed that the 10 kgs of methamphetamine was handed over to Campos at his house in Parañaque by Major Abogado, after which it was broken down into single kilogram bricks for resale. Garganera also testified that after Calvin Wong's abduction in October 1998 he was held hostage in Campos’s house in Don Bosco, Parañaque in order to extort money from his Triad boss Chong Hiu Ming, before one night being taken away by PNP Inspector Medel Poñe. Garganera further claimed that when he and Campos seen a TV news report a couple of weeks later about a dismembered body being found in Cavite, Campos remarked that it must have been Calvin Wong's.

According to Ong, in January 1999 Chong Hiu Ming was subsequently detained outside the Philippine Plaza Hotel by PNP officers working under Villaroman soon after arriving in Manila from Hong Kong, while Wong Kam Chong was abducted in March 1999 from the Damar Village in Quezon City after being connected to a 120 kilogram seizure of methamphetamine off Mindoro island in early 1999. Both Chong Hiu Ming and Wong Kam Chong were subjects of a joint Hong Kong Narcotics Bureau and PAOCTF surveillance operation at the time of their disappearance, with Campos monitoring a wiretap on Chong's phone for months before his abduction. As a result of the wiretap, in October 1998 Ong became aware that an even bigger 220 kilogram shipment had earlier been intercepted in Occidental Mindoro by officers working under Acop, which was not reported to the authorities. Ong alleged that both Chong and Wong were tortured by rouge PNP officers before eventually being summarily executed in May 1999, with their bodies being dismembered in the Province of Laguna and incinerated to dispose of the evidence. Ong admitted to fooling Chong and Wong on Campos' behalf into believing they were being released, by instructing them to dress in nice clothes at the safe house they were being detained in, and the last time she seen them alive was when Captain Avelino Abogado, Campos and Villaroman drove them off in a Mercedes-Benz van.

Ong told the court that she and Campos had travelled to Hong Kong to negotiate a ransom payment with Chong's relatives, with her acting as translator, and produced an official Hong Kong police report with Campos' picture to prove he was the person identified by Chong's family as the contact between them and the kidnapping gang. Ong also admitted that Wong Kam Chong was held hostage at an apartment she rented at the Villa Carolina Townhouses in Tambo, Parañaque. Ong submitted as evidence an October 1999 official letter from the Embassy of the People's Republic of China, asking Lacson to investigate Wong's abduction by "military looking men" and specially naming Acop, Villaroman, and Campos as the prime suspects in his disappearance. Ong further claimed that despite it being known that Wong told his wife Lao Yet Yet during ransom negotiations that he was being held hostage by Villaroman and Campos, the investigation into his abduction was personally assigned to Villaroman by Lacson. Ong went onto describe a November 1999 meeting she attended in Ortigas Center with Campos, Acop and Villaroman at the Edsa Shangri-La Hotel, where they discussed the consular letters regarding Wong's abduction. According to Ong, she was given ₱50,000 by Acop to take a holiday abroad until the heat died down, while Villaroman was gloating they were lucky Lacson had tasked him to head the investigation. Regarding ransom payments, Ong claimed that relatives of Chong had paid ₱2.5 million to secure his release, where as Wong's family had transferred ₱20 million, however both were killed regardless to prevent their kidnapping being reported.

On 26 March 1999, Ong was purportedly present in Parañaque when a PAOCTF team arrested four Chinese nationals (Zeng Jia Xuan, his wife Hong Zhen Qiao, his 13-year-old sister Zeng Kang San and his friend James Ong) before holding them hostage in a safehouse, and later witnessed a ₱7 million cash ransom being handed over for their release. Although the teenaged Zeng Kang San was safely returned to Xiamen, the remainder remained missing presumed dead after allegedly being killed on Acop's orders. Ong claimed to have overheard a telephone call between Lacson and Acop at Camp Vicente Lim on 18 May 1999, where Lacson berated Acop after learning the hostages were still alive and Acop assured him they would be "taken care of" the following day.An individual named Chan Ka Tseung was arrested in July 1999 by corrupt PNP officers in his home at San Juan Residences in Pasig, and after a ransom of ₱5 million demanded from Chan's wife (Wong Lai Ting) went unpaid he was purportedly executed the following month on Villaroman's orders, Ong added. Ong specifically named Cabanatuan City police officer Senior Inspector Medel Poñe as the PAOCTF's chief executioner, tagging him in the October 1998 abduction of Calvin Wong from the Century Park Hotel as well as the killings of kidnap victims.

City of Manila
Locations relevant to PAOCTF allegations
1 Camp Aguinaldo
2 Camp Crame
3 62 Maria Clara Street, Quezon City
4 Philippine Plaza Hotel
5 Damar Village, Quezon City
6 San Juan Residences, Pasig
7 Villa Carolina Townhouse condo

=== PAOCTF & PNP allegations ===
To back up her allegations, Ong submitted copious amounts of documentary evidence to both courts, such as cheques signed by Acop to provide the buy money for a drug bust in October 1998, as well as photocopies of the passports & airline tickets of Chinese nationals kidnapped by rouge PNP officers in the late 1990s. Regarding Lacson personally, Ong claimed to have spoken to him over the phone in September 1999 to seek payment of a ₱3 million reward she was owed for "Operation Plan Cyclops", and that he was well aware of the illegal activities committed by Acop and other subordinate PAOCTF officers. Ong also revealed that she had recently been invited to the United States to help US Customs agents investigate a US$7 million haul of cash that was confiscated from Lacson at the Canada–United States border, to assist in the investigation of Lacson for RICO statute violations and to see if the seized funds could be linked to any of her Philippine allegations against him. The court heard how an earlier report from US authorities had identified a Bank of America account at the Woodman Street branch in Van Nuys, California containing US$20 million in the name of Lacson's wife, while the Council of Philippine Affairs announced it had discovered a bank account under Lason's name in the Cayman Islands holding over US$20 million that had been opened in 1997.

Ong asserted that had Lacson escaped judicial scrutiny for so long because many Philippine lawmakers, senators and congressmen were fearful he had incriminating information against them, and revealed that Lacson had previously shown her documents seized from suspected drug trafficker Alfredo Tiongco that contained data relating to Senators Tito Sotto and Nikki Coseteng. PAOCTF members Chief Superintendent Reynaldo Acop, Superintendent Francisco Villaroman and Superintendent John Campos were directly accused by Ong of the kidnapping and summary execution of at least three ethnic Chinese drug trafficking suspects, as well as reselling illegal narcotics confiscated in police operations. Ong also made claims that a videotape of four Chinese individuals arrested by PAOCTF in 1998, and who were later murdered by PNP officers, being interrogated about money was handed over to anti-crime activist Teresita Ang-See but instead of sharing it with the authorities Ang-See delivered it to Acop instead. Ang-See later confirmed the tape existed, and described it depicting a handcuffed man being gruffly interrogated in a mixture of Mandarin Chinese and Hokkien about a missing ₱30 million. The fact the interrogator says "this is the Philippines, not Heilongjiang" led investigators to believe it was filmed locally, Ang-See added.

Ong also made further allegations about Remus Garganera, describing him as an associate of Superintendent Campos who helped them kidnap drug traffickers for ransom and of supervising a warehouse where illegal narcotics were stored on behalf of rouge PNP officers. Garganera confessed to the court that he had guarded kidnap victims for Campos after witnessing their abductions, adding that he helped to count the cash generated from the sale of methamphetamine by PAOCTF members on a near nightly basis. Garganera specifically described how both Chong Hiu Ming and Zeng Jia Xuan's group were held at Ong's rented condo at Villa Carolina Townhouse for several months, where they were often beaten while phoning their families asking for ransom payments. Ong maintained her reasons for testifying against PAOCTF members were to ensure justice was served and the law was upheld, revealing that in late August 2001 she had been offered a ₱10 million bribe by a senior PNP officer if she refused to testify against Lacson, while asserting that a different pair of PNP officials offered bribes of ₱2 million in November 1999 and ₱4 million in November 1999 if she would sign affidavits absolving Acop of any involvement in alleged drug trafficking activities and knowledge of illegal acts by PAOCTF members under his command. Ong also dismissed accusations from Acop that she was heavily involved in an illegal gambling operation in Manila, clarifying she ran a small neighbourhood numbers game after being left with no income after Acop failed to pay her reward money related to PAOCTF sting operations. Regarding assertions by John Campos that they were never in a romantic relationship, Ong claimed to possess a sex tape video featuring her and Campos that would prove her claims.

=== Lacson & Acop rebuttals ===
In response to Ong's allegations, LDP Senator Ping Lacson dismissed Ong as a scorned woman who was trying to get revenge on her former agent handler Campos for jilting her, while also making allegations about him on behalf of his enemies Roberto Lastimoso and Reynaldo Berroya in return for immunity from prosecution for pending Estafa cases, such as a ₱1.3 million lawsuit in Caloocan City for cheque fraud. Former PNP chief Roberto Lastimoso was likewise named by Lacson as having instructed Ong to spread false rumours about him, claiming that Lastimoso had even gifted her a luxury apartment in the Eisenhower condominium building in Greenhills as a reward.Lacson also asserted that she was an unreliable witness, highlighting that an earlier debrief with US Customs officials determined her not to be credible. The June 2001 report Lacson was referring to was in relation to a separate investigation into alleged secret bank accounts Lacson held in the United States of America, where Ong was flown to San Francisco as a corroborating witness in a proposed Federal money laundering case. The agents who interviewed Ong over four days determined that she was withholding vital information about her ongoing contacts with senior Triad members in Hong Kong, as well as being too eager to discuss financial compensation and immunity from prosecution for co-operating with American authorities. Lacson also denied accusations from military intelligence officer Victor Corpus that he had over US$700 million stashed in foreign bank accounts.

Reynaldo Acop likewise dismissed Ong's testimony and branded her a pathological liar who was deeply involved in criminality. Although Acop did admit paying Ong reward money in return for setting up targets for PNP sting operations, he denied authorising a ₱2 million payment for her to set up a drug deal with Hong Kong based Triad members, insisting that a United Coconut Planters Bank personal cheque for that amount signed by him on 10 October 1998 was an emergency loan in lieu of overdue payments from the PAOCTF, and was not a downpayment for 25 kilograms of methamphetamine as Ong claimed. Acop further alleged that Ong had in fact stolen ₱4.5 million in "show money" that was supposed to be used in a sting operation in 1998, as well as helping Triad boss Chong Yuk Sui enter the Philippines and obtaining driver's licenses for his underlings via corrupt Land Transportation Office officials. Regarding Wong Kam Chong's disappearance, Acop asserted that it was Ong herself who ordered another Triad to abduct him in an attempt to gain access to ₱500 million stashed in a Hong Kong bank account controlled by Wong, and subsequently authorising his murder to prevent the crime being reported.

== Murder of John Campos ==
Superintendent John Campos vehemently denied all of Ong's accusations against him, countering that his PAOCTF team was actually involved in the rescue of several kidnapped ethnic Chinese who were afterwards identified as suspected members of a Hong Kong-based crime syndicate. Campos claimed Ong had invented stories of police corruption in order to escape prosecution for her own crimes, and submitted a position paper to the Senate Committee on Public Order & Illegal Drugs asserting that:

- Ong was assigned to him as an agent and they posed as a couple during investigations, however she later became bitter after he rejected her romantic overtures
- Ong was named in kidnap victim's relatives sworn statements as the prime suspect in their disappearance, highlighting how it was Ong alone who conducted negotiations and made threats on the detainees lives, as well as providing her own bank account details for ransom payments to be sent to
- Ong only began making allegations against PNP officers after ₱4.5 million supplied by the Philippine Drug Enforcement Agency for a sting operation went missing
- Ong was making allegations against Ping Lacson to ruin his political career as a favour to Reynaldo Berroya, who had in the early 1990s killed the main witness in a drug trafficking case on Ong's behalf
- another reason for Ong's accusations against powerful PNP officers was to be placed in witness protection and have a government funded refuge from rival Triad drug traffickers who she had double crossed
- Ong also had several cases pending for massive credit card fraud, including an alleged US$200,000 fraud against American Express

Despite this, Ong had repeatedly contacted Campos to plead with him to inform on his former colleagues and join her at Camp Aguinaldo, where she had been living within the witness protection program under 24 hour armed guard due to threats to her life from rouge PNP officers after agreeing to testify against senior government officials. In October 2002, an armed intruder in a stolen AFP military uniform attempted to assassinate Ong inside her safe house but was arrested by her guards. In early December 2002, Campos allegedly called Ong to say Lacson had ordered her murder and that he wanted to also turn state's evidence against his superiors, however on 4 December 2002 Campos was shot dead by unknown gunmen outside a fast food restaurant in the Don Bosco district of Parañaque before he could turn himself in.

According to media reports, Campos was shot twice in the back and once in the head by a gunman firing an M16 rifle, while 29-year-old waitress Emily Dumlao was also killed in the crossfire. In response to Ong publicly accusing him of masterminding Campos' murder because he allegedly planned to testify against him, Lacson announced he had instructed his lawyers to raise a libel case against her. Campos was later buried with full military honors in his hometown of Cebu City. His funeral was attended by Ping Lacson, who described Campos as "his long lost son" and vowed to bring his killers to justice.

== Aftermath ==
=== Lacson, Acop & Villaroman ===
Although a resulting Senate Committee Report No. 66 recommended Ping Lacson be indicted for offenses such as "kidnapping, drug trafficking, and summary executions”, in August 2003 Lacson used his political influence to have the report permanently shelved. The report had found Lacson being guilty of "neglect of duty under the doctrine of command responsibility" regarding his command of both the PNP and the PAOCTF, while also recommending charges be filed against Chief Superintendent Reynaldo Acop, Senior Superintendent Francisco Villaroman and Superintendent John Campos for their involvement in the kidnapping of several ethnic Chinese individuals in the Metro Manila region.

In 2010, Villaroman was charged over his involvement in the murders of Chong Hiu Ming and Wong Kam Chong, whose partial remains had been unearthed in the Province of Cavite a few years previously. The Sandiganbayan Second Division court confirmed in 2001 that prima facie evidence had been proved against Acop and he was subsequently charged in 2002 along with several other PNP officers in relation to Ong's testimony. However by July 2011 all charges of bribery against Acop and Villaroman regarding the December 1998 PAOCTF raid were dismissed.

In 2017, Lacson claimed the Senate hearings of the early 2000s were part of a smear campaign triggered by supporters of the then incumbent President Gloria Macapagal Arroyo in order to ruin his political career, as he had planned to run against her in the 2004 Philippine presidential election. Lacson remarked that they succeeded in preventing him winning the election, as his positive 73% approval rating in December 2000 had crashed to negative 13% by August 2001.

=== Mary Ong ===
In February 2003, Ong was interviewed by investigative reporter Terry Gould regarding fugitive criminal Steven Lik Man Wong, who was subject to an Interpol Red Notice in relation to drug trafficking offences in Canada. Ong later signed an affidavit regarding meeting Wong, who was subordinate to Hong Kong's North Point district 14K Triad boss Chong Yuk Sui, while undercover on "Operation Viking" between 1994 and 1996 when she made an introduction to Consolacion Figueroa Coo, who was a Manila-based drug trafficker with connections to a prominent Cavite Province political family.

In November 2003, Ong began hosting an early morning radio show titled "Rosebud Against Illegal Drugs" on DWDD-AM. In 2004, Ong appealed to President Arroyo to force the PNP to pay her an alleged ₱4 million in unpaid reward money for her role in "Operation Plan Athena" and "Operation Plan Cyclops" in the late 1990s, adding that her house in Parañaque City had been foreclosed due to her being unable to pay the mortgage. In May 2008, Ong personally visited President Arroyo at Malacañang Palace to thank her for an upgrade to her living conditions while under protective custody.

Despite previously being admitted to the witness protection program for her own safety, Ong was removed from the program (allegedly after pressure from Lacson) in September 2011 and asked to vacate Camp Aguinaldo without her bodyguards after military intelligence reports assessed she was no longer under any threats. In July 2021, Ong and her brother Peter were arrested by undercover NBI agents after a sting operation in Pasay City for allegedly selling AstraZeneca vaccinations to ethnic Chinese customers for ₱7,000 per dose in violation of the Anti-Graft and Corrupt Practices Act.
