= 1998 Manila PAOCTF kidnap-for-ransom incident =

1998 Philippine police corruption scandal

- Location: 14.626304°N 121.002130°E; 62 Maria Clara Street, Quezon City, Metro Manila, Philippines
- Date: 6 December 1998; 22:30 (PST)
- Target: suspected 14K Triad members
- Attack type: Kidnapping
- Deaths: Calvin Wong; Chong Hiu Ming
- Victims: Lu Shao Min; Wang Jin Luan; Jin Plao Wang Chua; Li Jiaz Hu; Ah Chun; Eduardo Ling Hing Ong
- Perpetrators: Presidential Anti-Organized Crime Task Force; Mary "Rosebud" Ong
- Assailants: Cesar Aquino; Antonio Ventura; Ferdinand Apuli; Anthony Ong
- Motive: Kidnap-for-ransom
- Inquiry: September 2001 Philippine Anti-Graft Court hearings
- Accused: Ping Lacson; Superintendent Francisco Villaroman; Chief Superintendent Reynaldo Acop; Superintendent John Campos
- Convicted: 0

The 1998 Manila PAOCTF kidnap-for-ransom incident occurred at 62 Maria Clara Street in the Quezon City district of Manila, Philippines when corrupt Presidential Anti-Organized Crime Task Force members allegedly abducted and blackmailed several ethnic Chinese suspected of drug trafficking on the night of 6 December 1998. Although a ransom was allegedly paid by the men's employer in Hong Kong, he himself was purportedly later kidnapped and killed by corrupt police officers. The incident was later the subject of Philippine Senate hearings into illegal drug trafficking and political corruption.

== Background ==
Due to a dramatic rise in kidnapping-for-ransom crimes in the early 1990's, President Fidel V. Ramos created the Presidential Anti-Organized Crime Task Force to combat organized crime in the Philippines. Senior Superintendent Panfilo Lacson was assigned to head a unit focusing on kidnapping syndicates targeting Filipino Chinese citizens in the Metro Manila area. In 1993, Lacson recruited 37-year-old Mary "Rosebud" Ong, who had worked as a 14K Triad "Big Sister" (Chinese: 太姐) and money launderer before being arrested for drug trafficking, to act as an agent provocateur to set up various 14K Triad drug traffickers operating out of Manila in sting operations organized by the Philippine National Police for a flat fee of $US40,000 per operation. PNP Superintendent John Campos was assigned to Ong as her agent handler, where they often posed as a romantic couple during operations, and despite Campos being 10 years her junior he eventually became her common-law husband

== Maria Clara Street raid ==
In 1998, a joint Hong Kong Narcotics Bureau and PAOCTF surveillance operation identified a Hong Konger 14K Triad member named Chong Hiu Ming, who they suspected of being involved in the trafficking methamphetamine.PNP Superintendent Campos, who was a leading member of PAOCTF, had been monitoring a wiretap on Chong's phone for several months in the course of his investigations, and in October 1998 directed PAOCTF officers to arrest Chong's associate Calvin Wong at the Century Park Hotel in Manila. On the night of 6 December 1998, a PAOCTF team raided an apartment at 62 Maria Clara Street in Quezon City to arrest number of alleged 14K Triad members (Lu Shao Min, Wang Jin Luan, Jin Plao Wang Chua, Li Jiaz Hu, Ah Chun, and Eduardo Ling Hing Ong), who had been set up by Ong in a sting operation.The men were promptly taken into custody after 30 grams of methamphetamine and several unlicensed firearms were discovered in the apartment. Three of the group (Eduardo Hong Ling Ong, Ah Chun, Li Jiaz Hu) were released after posting bail, and their criminal case was eventually dismissed a few months later after the arresting officers (Cesar Aquino, Antonio Ventura, Ferdinand Apuli and Anthony Ong) failed to appear in court for the preliminary hearing. In January 1999, Chong Hiu Ming himself was subsequently detained outside the Philippine Plaza Hotel by PAOCTF operatives soon after arriving in Manila from Hong Kong. Neither Calvin Wong or Chong Hiu Ming were ever seen alive again. In 2001, Chong's wife Hung Chin Sum appealed to the Chinese government to investigate her husband's disappearance.

== Mary "Rosebud" Ong allegations ==
In July 2000, a PNP communiqué announced that PAOCTF operatives had reduced kidnapping cases by 29 percent, rescued 94 victims, arrested 73 perpetrators, and prosecuted 125 suspects in the previous 2 years. It also said 30 kidnapping incidents were thwarted and approximately ₱13.7 million in ransom money was recovered by the PAOCTF task force nationwide. However, after becoming disillusioned with her role as a PAOCTF agent, in January 2001 Ong submitted to the Office of the Ombudsman a 22 page length sworn statement against high-ranking PNP officials such as Ping Lacson and his then deputy Michael Ray Aquino, alleging their involvement in drug trafficking, kidnapping for ransom and murder. In March 2001, the National Bureau of Investigation recommended criminal charges be filed against Lacson and his co-accused for serious crimes, including kidnapping for ransom and subsequent murder of Chong Hiu Ming. In April 2001, in response to the NBI report and the earlier implication of PAOCTF members in the Dacer–Corbito double murder case, the PAOCTF was abolished by President Gloria Macapagal Arroyo's Executive Order #10. In May 2001, Lacson and 13 other individuals were subpoenaed by the Philippines Department of Justice to answer charges related to the kidnapping and murder of individuals identified in the earlier NBI investigation.

Ong testified in September 2001 at the Philippine Anti-Graft Court that in December 1998 she set up the alleged 14K Triad members arrested at Maria Clara Street, after which PNP Chief Superintendent Reynaldo Acop directed her to travel to Hong Kong to negotiate a ransom of ₱3 million and 10 kilograms of methamphetamine with senior Triad member Chong Hui Ming for their release. Ong was able to present phone records between herself, PAOCTF members Superintendent Francisco Villaroman and Superintendent John Campos to back up her claims of negotiations in Hong Kong, while her brother Peter Ong, who acted as her chauffeur, testified to personally witnessing the surveillance of suspected drug traffickers in Manila and the subsequent PNP arrest operations. After the ransom and 10 kgs of drugs were allegedly handed over, three of the group were released after posting bail, with their criminal case eventually being dismissed a few months later after the arresting officers failed to appear in court for the preliminary hearing.

Witness Remus Garganera backed up Ong's testimony by claiming to have accompanied John Campos when ₱3 million was withdrawn from a Metrobank branch on Shaw Boulevard, after which they brought the money to Camp Vicente Lim, where the cash was split up between Acop, Villaroman, and the rest of the PAOCTF team. Garganera further claimed that the 10 kgs of methamphetamine was handed over to Campos at his house in Parañaque by Major Abogado, after which it was broken down into single kilogram bricks for resale. Garganera also testified that after Calvin Wong's abduction in October 1998 he was held hostage in Campos’s house in Parañaque in order to extort money from his Triad boss Chong Hiu Ming, before one night being taken away by PNP Inspector Medel Poñe. Garganera further claimed that when he and Campos seen a TV news report a couple of weeks later about a dismembered body being found in Cavite, Campos remarked that it must have been Calvin Wong's.

According to Ong, in January 1999 Chong Hiu Ming was subsequently detained outside the Philippine Plaza Hotel by PNP officers working under Villaroman soon after arriving in Manila from Hong Kong. Chong Hiu Ming was the subject of a joint Hong Kong Narcotics Bureau and PAOCTF surveillance operation at the time of his disappearance.Ong alleged Chong was tortured by rouge PNP officers before eventually being summarily executed in May 1999, with his body being dismembered in the Province of Laguna and incinerated to dispose of the evidence. Ong admitted to fooling Chong on Campos' behalf into believing he was being released, by instructing him to dress in nice clothes at the safe house he was being detained in, and the last time she seen him alive was when Captain Avelino Abogado, Campos and Villaroman drove him off in a Mercedes-Benz van with another kidnap victim.Ong told the court that she and Campos had travelled to Hong Kong to negotiate a ransom payment with Chong's relatives, with her acting as translator, and produced an official Hong Kong police report with Campos' picture to prove he was one identified by Chong's family as the contact between them and the kidnapping gang. Regarding ransom payments, Ong claimed that relatives of Chong had paid ₱2.5 million to secure his release, however he was killed regardless to prevent his kidnapping being reported.

To back up her allegations, Ong submitted copious amounts of documentary evidence to the court, such as cheques signed by Acop to provide the buy money for a drug bust in October 1998, as well as photocopies of the passports & airline tickets of Chinese nationals kidnapped by rouge PNP officers in the late 1990's. Ong also made claims that a videotape of four Chinese individuals arrested by PAOCTF in 1998, and who were later murdered by PNP officers, being interrogated about money was handed over to anti-crime activist Teresita Ang-See but instead of sharing it with the authorities Ang-See delivered it to Acop instead.

== Lacson & Acop rebuttals ==
In response to Ong's allegations, LDP Senator Ping Lacson dismissed Ong as a scorned woman who was trying to get revenge on her former agent handler Campos for jilting her, while also making allegations about him on behalf of his enemies Roberto Lastimoso and Reynaldo Berroya in return for immunity from prosecution for pending Estafa cases, such as a ₱1.3 million lawsuit in Caloocan City for cheque fraud. Former PNP chief Roberto Lastimoso was likewise named by Lacson as having instructed Ong to spread false rumours about him, claiming that Lastimoso had even gifted her a luxury apartment in the Eisenhower condominium building in the exclusive Greenhills district as a reward.Lacson also asserted that she was an unreliable witness, highlighting that an earlier debrief with US Customs officials determined her not to be credible. Lacson also denied accusations from military intelligence officer Victor Corpus that he had over US$700 million stashed in foreign bank accounts.

Reynaldo Acop likewise dismissed Ong's testimony and branded her a pathological liar who was deeply involved in criminality. Although Acop did admit paying Ong reward money in return for setting up targets for PNP sting operations, he denied authorising a ₱2 million payment for her to set up a drug deal with Hong Kong based Triad members, insisting that a United Coconut Planters Bank personal cheque for that amount signed by him on 10 October 1998 was an emergency loan in lieu of overdue payments from the PAOCTF. Acop further alleged that Ong had in fact stolen ₱4.5 million in "show money" that was supposed to be used in a sting operation in 1998, as well as helping Triad boss Chong Yuk Soy enter the Philippines and obtaining driver's licenses for his underlings via corrupt Land Transportation Office officials.

== Aftermath ==
Although a resulting Senate Committee Report No. 66 recommended Ping Lacson be indicted for offenses such as "kidnapping, drug trafficking, and summary executions”, in August 2003 Lacson used his political influence to have the report permanently shelved. The report had found Lacson being guilty of "neglect of duty under the doctrine of command responsibility" regarding his command of both the PNP and the PAOCTF, while also recommending charges be filed against Chief Superintendent Reynaldo Acop, Senior Superintendent Francisco Villaroman and Superintendent John Campos for the involvement in the kidnapping of several ethnic Chinese individuals in the Metro Manila region.In 2017, Lacson claimed the Senate hearings of the early 2000's were part of a smear campaign triggered by supporters of the then incumbent President Gloria Macapagal Arroyo in order to ruin his political career, as he had planned to run against her in the 2004 Philippine presidential election. Lacson remarked that they succeeded in preventing him winning the election, as his positive 73% approval rating in December 2000 had crashed to negative 13% by August 2001.

In 2010, Francisco Villaroman was charged over his involvement in the murder of Chong Hiu Ming, whose partial remains had been unearthed in the Province of Cavite a few years previously. The Sandiganbayan Second Division court confirmed in 2001 that prima facie evidence had been proved against Acop and he was subsequently charged in 2002 along with several other PNP officers in relation to Ong's testimony. However by July 2011 all charges against Acop and Villaroman regarding the December 1998 PAOCTF raid were dismissed.

Superintendent John Campos vehemently denied all of Ong's accusations against him, countering that his PAOCTF team was actually involved in the rescue of several kidnapped ethnic Chinese who were afterwards identified as suspected members of a Hong Kong-based crime syndicate. Campos claimed Ong had invented stories of police corruption in order to escape prosecution for her own crimes, and in a position paper submitted to the Senate Committee on Public Order & Illegal Drugs asserted that Ong's motive for making accusations against powerful PNP officers was to be placed in witness protection and have a government funded refuge from rival Triad drug traffickers who she had double crossed. On 4 December 2002, Campos was shot dead by unknown gunmen outside a fast food restaurant in the Don Bosco district of Parañaque.

Since late 2000, Mary "Rosebud" Ong had been living under 24 hour armed guard at Camp Aguinaldo within the witness protection program due to threats to her life from rouge PNP officers after agreeing to testify against senior government officials. Ong was removed from the program (allegedly after pressure from Lacson) in September 2011 and asked to vacate Camp Aguinaldo without her bodyguards after military intelligence reports assessed she was no longer under any threats. In July 2021, Ong and her brother Peter were arrested by undercover NBI agents after a sting operation in Pasay City for allegedly selling AstraZeneca vaccinations to ethnic Chinese customers for ₱7,000 per dose in violation of the Anti-Graft and Corrupt Practices Act.
