= MISG =

MISG may refer to:

- The Mathematics in Industry Study Group, an annual workshop now held in Australia, under the wing of Australian and NZ Industrial Applied Maths ANZIAM
- Malaysian Islamic Study Group, a U.S.-based student organization
- Metrocom Intelligence and Security Group, the former military police intelligence unit of the Philippine Constabulary Metropolitan Command.
