= January 1987 Philippine coup attempt =

Failed military overthrow of President Corazon Aquino

| Date | January 27–29, 1987 |
| Location | GMA-7 and other media outlets in Quezon City, Sangley Point Air Station, Villamor Airbase, Camp Aguinaldo, Camp Crame |
| Result | Philippine government victory: Coup averted; Surrender of coup participants; Deposed President Ferdinand Marcos' return to the Philippines aborted |

Belligerents
| Philippines | Guardians Brotherhood, Inc |

Commanders and leaders
| (Philippines) Corazon Aquino; Rafael Ileto; Fidel Ramos; Renato De Villa; Rodolfo Biazon | Ferdinand Marcos; Oscar Canlas; Rodolfo Calzado |

Military support
| Armed Forces of the Philippines | Marcos loyalists from the AFP |

Casualties and losses
- 1 rebel soldier dead; 60 wounded

On January 27, 1987, a coup d'état against the government of Philippine President Corazon Aquino was staged by civilian and military supporters of Aquino's deposed predecessor, Ferdinand Marcos. The soldiers were members of the Armed Forces of the Philippines (AFP) who belonged to the Guardians Brotherhood, Inc (GBI) led by Colonel Oscar Canlas. They launched failed attacks on Philippine Air Force (PAF) installations at Villamor Air Base in Pasay and Sangley Point Air Station in Cavite, and occupied the GMA-7 television station in Quezon City for 61 hours before surrendering on January 29.

The coup was the third attempt to overthrow Aquino and was the first incident to produce a fatality. It was later surpassed by a subsequent coup attempt in August that year.

== Background ==
At the time of the coup, the Aquino government was grappling with several political crises such as the aftermath of the God Save the Queen Plot in November 1986, the gradual deterioration of relations with the Reform the Armed Forces Movement (RAM), a group of dissident soldiers and officers of the AFP that led by Colonel Gringo Honasan and Defense Minister Juan Ponce Enrile which helped install Aquino into the presidency during the People Power revolution which ended the Marcos dictatorship and forced him into exile in February 1986, the fallout from the Mendiola Massacre on January 22, 1987 which shattered her relations with the Left, and preparations for the plebiscite on the ratification of a new constitution on February 2.

=== Preparations and warnings ===
The personnel involved in the coup were members of the Guardians Brotherhood, Inc (GBI), a military organization which claimed membership of about 70 percent of the total AFP strength. Some of them also participated in the first coup attempt against Aquino's government at the Manila Hotel Siege in July 1986. They were also identified as supporters of former President Ferdinand Marcos, who after his overthrow had been living in exile in Hawaii, and were critical of the Aquino government's perceived lenient approach towards the communist insurgency in the Philippines. Subsequent investigations revealed that members of the GBI had been discussing plans for a coup and recruiting among personnel in Central Luzon and the PAF as early as December 1986.

On January 20, 1987, reports reached the Philippine Army of a plot to eliminate the AFP leadership and depose Aquino. Another plot hatched by RAM was reportedly discovered on January 24 but did not push through following a meeting between AFP Chief of Staff Fidel Ramos and RAM leaders Gringo Honasan and Eduardo Kapunan.

== Coup ==
In the early morning of January 27, 1987, about 400 rebel soldiers arrived in Manila from the military garrison in San Fernando, Pampanga, and branched out to seize their targets, namely the PAF headquarters in Villamor Air Base, Sangley Point Air Station and the GMA-7 television station, in a bid to overthrow Aquino and restore Marcos to the presidency. Government officials later claimed that they had also planned to forestall the constitutional plebiscite due on February 2. However, the rebels subsequently denied aiming to overthrow Aquino's government, saying that they were fighting against a communist takeover and protesting the presence of leftist officials in her cabinet.

A reinforcement unit from Central Luzon consisting of 111 personnel led by Colonel Reynaldo Cabauatan was prevented from linking up with the main rebel force after they were intercepted by government forces at the Balintawak Toll Plaza of the North Diversion Road.

=== Occupation of GMA-7 ===
GMA-7 studios

An advanced party of dissidents from the PAF arrived at the GMA Network Center at 1:30 am and herded 43 staff and visitors into the Talent Room. The main body of soldiers, led by Air Force intelligence officer Colonel Oscar Canlas, arrived at 5 am. In total, their strength was estimated to be at around 200 personnel, and were later augmented by about 100 civilian supporters of Marcos who had gathered outside, among them actors Elizabeth Oropesa, Alona Alegre, Annie Ferrer and Amay Bisaya. Although government forces managed to cordon off the area, clashes broke out between the civilian Marcos loyalists and counterdemonstrators who showed up.

At the same time, other nearby television stations, namely government-run PTV-4 and RPN-9 were also attacked by the rebels. Both stations were later secured by progovernment forces but remained off the air until noon.

=== Attacks on military facilities ===
Five officers and 69 soldiers assaulted Villamor Air Base, having only been discovered once they started unloading their weapons inside. They tried to seize several Huey and Sikorsky helicopters but were stopped after a fierce gun battle in which one rebel was killed. The rebels subsequently surrendered.

At Sangley Air Base, about 55 soldiers led by Lieutenant Colonel Rodolfo Calzado entered the facility, blocked the runway, and briefly held hostage the commanding general and his deputy before surrendering.

Another group of about 100 soldiers tried to launch an attack at AFP headquarters in Camp Aguinaldo, but were arrested. Several dozen rebels were reported to have barricaded themselves in a residential subdivision after a similar attack on Philippine Constabulary headquarters at Camp Crame failed. A civilian-military demonstration in support of the coup was broken up at Philippine Army headquarters in Fort Bonifacio and its participants were arrested.

=== Marcos' attempted return ===
Despite Marcos' denials of involvement, US and Philippine officials reported that during the coup, the Marcoses had leased a Boeing 707 from the Miami-based firm Pan Aviation owned by Lebanese arms dealer Sarkis Soghanalian, who had been indicted in a US court and was an associate of Saudi billionaire Adnan Khashoggi, himself a friend of former First Lady Imelda Marcos and a major figure in the Iran-Contra scandal. The manager of a military clothing shop said that Mrs. Marcos led an entourage to the store in anticipation of their return, buying just over $2,000 worth of merchandise that included its entire stock of camouflage military trousers, combat boots and olive-drab T-shirts. However, the plan was aborted on January 30 after the Marcoses were confronted by officials of the US State Department and reminded of an informal agreement they made with their hosts not to return to the Philippines.

As a precaution, the Aquino government ordered additional soldiers and helicopter gunships to Marcos' home province of Ilocos Norte during the coup, and deployed tanks to block the runway of Laoag International Airport.

=== Negotiations and end of the coup ===
By noon, it had become apparent that the only stronghold of the rebels was the GMA Network Center. However, plans by the government to storm the complex were prevented by the increasing presence of civilian supporters of the rebels who, despite the military blockade, simply went over the barriers and entered the premises. During this time Aquino urged the rebels at GMA-7 to surrender, while broadly hinting that "intensive military operations" were imminent. She also ordered the arrest of all rebel soldiers. The Archbishop of Manila, Cardinal Jaime Sin, also appeared on television to urge calm and asked people to stay home.

Attempts were made to use Canlas' former classmates in the Philippine Military Academy, as well as his wife and sons, who were cadets in the PMA, to contact him over the phone and on radio to persuade him to surrender, to no avail. However, Canlas subsequently became the subject of public ridicule when, after Canlas' wife went on the radio calling on him to surrender, another woman called the station, insisting that she was Canlas' real wife. Although the rebels released 37 station employees in the evening, the standoff continued into the next day, with the rebels allowing some 20 journalists inside the compound to see the situation and as protection against an attack.

At 3 am on January 28, Canlas met personally with Ramos at a van parked outside the compound. During conversations broadcast live on radio, Ramos sternly ordered Canlas to surrender, who responded that they were "willing to pay the price of our behavior," insisting that they were demonstrating against growing communist influence and not plotting to overthrow Aquino. After the failure of the negotiations, Canlas issued an open letter explaining their actions and calling for the overthrow of Aquino and the restoration of Marcos. After several hours, tear gas was fired at the complex and government soldiers were placed on standby to move in when RAM officers led by Honasan stepped in to mediate, warning Ramos that a violent assault would fatally undermine the AFP. During this time, Ramos, who had set up camp at a house next to the complex, and other officials were considering digging a tunnel under the station for elite forces to use in an assault, while Canlas and several of his supporters managed to issue a radio message demanding a stop to the tear gas attacks.

Following another round of lengthy negotiations, the rebels finally agreed to surrender, and at 9:00 a.m., on January 29, the civilian rebel supporters left the complex and were brought to the Northern Police District headquarters at Camp Karingal for processing, followed by Canlas and his troops at 4 pm. They were escorted by PMA Superintendent Brigadier General Rodolfo Biazon and detained in Fort Bonifacio.

The rebels boarded nine buses at the GMA-7 compound after waving goodbye from the station rooftop to remaining followers outside. Before entering the buses, the troops, cheering and raising clenched fists, emptied their ammunition clips from their weapons. On their way to Fort Bonifacio, they were escorted by 10 police motorcycles and four police cars and surrendered their firearms upon arrival. Before arriving at the fort, Canlas and 12 other officers were allowed to make a press conference at the Ministry of National Defense in Camp Aguinaldo, during which they insisted that they had not launched a rebellion and denied responsibility for the other attacks that occurred.

== Aftermath ==
=== Political and military repercussions ===
The insistence of government officials and the coup participants to avoid the word "surrender" in discussing their withdrawal from GMA-7, as well as Ramos' insistence that the rebels were "misguided elements" of the AFP, were seen as part of a face-saving way out of the coup, which highlighted the splits in the armed forces.

The constitutional plebiscite went ahead as planned on February 2, 1987, with 76% of voters approving the new Constitution, which came into effect that day. Its ratification was seen as a popular rebuke to the coup plotters.

=== Casualties and damage ===
The only fatality recorded during the coup was Private Daniel Hubag, who was killed while fighting for the rebel side at Villamor Air Base on January 27. Sixteen rebels were also injured in the assault on Villamor, while 35 people, mostly civilians, were injured during the three-day standoff at GMA-7. In total, nearly 60 people were injured during the coup.

Officials at GMA said the rebels left the building in disarray, with 'waste material and leftover food' strewn all over the floor and electronic equipment from the studios, personal valuables, and cash from the offices also missing. The channel was unable to broadcast for the three days of the coup, leading to losses of about P3 million. Its canteen was ransacked, losing P45,000. The government said they would compensate the station for damages incurred.

=== Prosecution of coup participants ===
Three hours after Canlas' surrender, Aquino announced that charges of rebellion would be placed on more than 100 civilian participants in the coup, most of which were later dropped. Canlas himself was detained until 1992, but was briefly released in 1989 to attend the graduation of his son Oscar Jr., at the PMA. In April 1987 another group of military dissidents attacked Fort Bonifacio in an attempt to release him and other detainees and overthrow Aquino. In May 1988, 106 military personnel were convicted for their participation in the coup, while in 1989, a court martial sentenced 14 military personnel to 6–12 years in prison for their role in the attack on Villamor Air Base.

On January 30, 1987, Ramos ordered the arrest of pro-Marcos officers Brigadier General Jose Maria Zumel, Colonel Rolando Abadilla and Colonel Reynaldo Cabauatan for alleged involvement in the coup. Abadilla, who was later accused of masterminding the coup, was arrested in July 1987, but was allowed to successfully run for vice governor of Ilocos Norte from prison in local elections held in January 1988. He was subsequently acquitted of the charges against him by a court martial in December 1988.

In 1991, Colonel Calzado was captured without resistance in Paco Park, Manila by the Philippine Air Force for leading the attack on Sangley Point, and was sentenced to 12 years in prison.

On August 28, 1992, Canlas and 15 other rebels who took part in the takeover of GMA were temporarily released from detention and placed in the custody of their respective service commanders on orders from Ramos, who was by then Aquino's successor as president. They were subsequently amnestied by Ramos.

== See also ==
- Coup attempts against Corazon Aquino

== Bibliography ==
- The Davide Fact-Finding Commission (1990). The Final Report of the Fact-Finding Commission (pursuant to R.A. No. 6832). Makati: Bookmark Inc. p. 118. ISBN 971-569-003-3.
