= Rolando Abadilla =

Filipino politician and military officer (died 1996)

Vice Governor of Ilocos Norte
- In office June 30, 1988 – June 30, 1992
- Governor: Rodolfo Fariñas
- Succeeded by: Mariano Nalupta Jr.

Personal details
- Born: Rolando N. Abadilla; 1941 or 1942 Espiritu, Ilocos Norte, Philippines
- Died: June 13, 1996 (aged 54) Quezon City, Philippines
- Party: Kilusang Bagong Lipunan
- Occupation: Politician, military officer
- Profession: Military officer
- Nickname(s): Rolly, Kabise

Military service
- Branch/service: Philippine Constabulary
- Years of service: 1965–1987
- Rank: Colonel
- Unit: MetroCom Intelligence and Security Group

Rolando “Rolly” Abadilla (died June 13, 1996) was a Filipino politician and Philippine Constabulary (PC) officer best known for heading the PC Metropolitan Command's Intelligence and Security Group under the dictatorship of Ferdinand Marcos, which became notorious for numerous documented human rights abuses.

After Marcos was ousted in the 1986 People Power Revolution, he was implicated in several coup attempts against President Corazon Aquino but was nevertheless elected to public office as vice governor of Ilocos Norte. He was assassinated in 1996 by the Alex Boncayao Brigade, a communist rebel group.

== Early life ==
Abadilla was born in Espiritu, now Banna, in Ilocos Norte, to a merchant family. His mother was a distant relative of Ferdinand Marcos.

== Military career ==
Abadilla graduated from the Philippine Military Academy in 1965 and joined the Philippine Constabulary special forces.

=== Operation Merdeka ===
Abadilla helped train Moro militants as part of a Philippine plot to infiltrate Sabah. He was subsequently accused of involvement in the trainees' murder during the Jabidah massacre in 1968 but was acquitted by a court martial.

=== Metrocom Intelligence and Security Group ===
Abadilla later transferred to the PC's Metrocom Intelligence and Security Group (MISG) and became its head in 1974. The group was notable for human rights abuses during the martial law era against anti-Marcos dissidents, including extrajudicial killings that were eventually known in Filipino slang as "salvagings". Among his deputies were Reynaldo Berroya and Panfilo Lacson. Abadilla was noted for being a favorite military official of Marcos.

=== Presence during the assassination of Ninoy Aquino ===
Abadilla was also accused of involvement in the assassination of Ninoy Aquino in 1983, having been present at the Manila International Airport, where the murder took place, immediately after the event. During the trial of military officers involved in Aquino's death, a witness who claimed that a soldier shot Aquino also claimed to have seen Abadilla talking to Rolando Galman, who the Marcos government alleged was Aquino's assassin, before he was killed by soldiers for allegedly killing Aquino. Abadilla denied the charges.

=== Marcos intermediary during the People Power Revolution ===
During the People Power Revolution in February 1986, Abadilla served as an intermediary of Marcos during negotiations with the rebellion's leaders, defense minister Juan Ponce Enrile and Armed Forces of the Philippines deputy chief of staff Fidel Ramos.

=== Coup attempts against Corazon Aquino ===
After Marcos was ousted, Abadilla was involved in plots to topple the government of President Corazon Aquino and restore Marcos to office, including the Siege of the Manila Hotel in July 1986 and the January 1987 Philippine coup attempt. He was arrested for his involvement in the latter coup in July 1987, but was acquitted by a court martial in December 1988.

== Political career ==
Even though imprisoned in 1987, Abadilla ran for Vice Governor of Ilocos Norte in 1988 as a candidate of Marcos' Kilusang Bagong Lipunan party and won. He supported efforts to repatriate Marcos' remains following his death in Hawaii in 1989. In 1992, he unsuccessfully ran for Governor of Ilocos Norte and lost again in a congressional race in the province in 1995.

Abadilla was also a member of the Presidential Anti-Crime Commission headed by Vice President Joseph Estrada during the administration of Fidel Ramos in the early 1990s.

== Personal life ==
Abadilla was married to Susan Samonte. One of their children, Maria Teresa Abadilla, became a Regional Trial Court judge in Manila. He also owned a trucking company. Several of his relatives continue to dominate politics in Banna, including his brothers Carlito and Jaime and nephew, Carlito II, who were former mayors of the town.

== Assassination ==
Abadilla was assassinated on June 13, 1996 at age of 54, after being shot in the middle of a traffic jam inside his car along Katipunan Avenue in Quezon City. He was shot 31 times using high-caliber pistols. His killing was claimed by the communist Alex Boncayao Brigade, which cited his role in human rights abuses during the martial law era. Five suspects, who subsequently became known as the "Abadilla 5", were arrested and convicted in 1999, following a controversial legal process that was criticized by Amnesty International for alleged irregularities and usage of torture.

Abadilla received a funeral with full military honors.

== Popular culture ==
Abadilla was portrayed by Ray Ventura in the film Ping Lacson: Super Cop.
