= Mohd Ridzuan Hashim =

Malaysian politician

Uztaz Haji Mohd Ridzuan Hashim
- محمد ريدزوان هاشم

Member of the Perlis State Legislative Assembly for Guar Sanji
- In office 2018–2025
- Preceded by: Jafperi Othman
- Succeeded by: Seat vacant

Personal details
- Born: Mohd Ridzuan bin Hashim; 12 February 1986 (age 40) Perlis
- Citizenship: Malaysian
- Party: PAS (till 2025, since 2026)
- Other political affiliations: Perikatan Nasional (2020-2025, since 2026)
- Spouse: Siti Khadijah Mustapha
- Occupation: Politician

Mohd Ridzuan bin Hashim is a Malaysian politician from PAS. He served as the Member of the Perlis State Legislative Assembly for Guar Sanji from 2022 to 2025.

== Political career ==
On 24 December 2025, Ridzuan's PAS membership was terminated as he and 2 other PAS and 5 BERSATU Members of Perlis State Legislative Assembly had sent a Statutory Declaration to pull back support from the then-Menteri Besar, Mohd Shukri Ramli. At the same time, his seat is declared vacant by the Speaker of Perlis State Legislative Assembly. On 1 February 2026, he and the other 2 PAS MLAs whose membership had been terminated applied to re-enter PAS, and the application was accepted.

== Election results ==
Perlis State Legislative Assembly
Year	Constituency	Candidate	Votes	Pct.	Opponent(s)	Votes	Pct.	Ballots cast	Majority	Turnout
2018	N13 Guar Sanji	Mohd Ridzuan Hashim (PAS)	3,199	42.19%	Afifi Osman (UMNO)	2,871	37.87%	7,725	328	83.67%
2018	N13 Guar Sanji	Mohd Ridzuan Hashim (PAS)	3,199	42.19%	Baridah Che Nayan (BERSATU)	1,512	19.94%	7,725	328	83.67%
2022	N13 Guar Sanji	Mohd Ridzuan Hashim (PAS)	6,717	74.20%	Rozieana Ahmad (UMNO)	1,616	17.85%	9,210	5,101	78.65%
2022	N13 Guar Sanji	Mohd Ridzuan Hashim (PAS)	6,717	74.20%	Hasparizal Hassan (PKR)	601	6.64%	9,210	5,101	78.65%
2022	N13 Guar Sanji	Mohd Ridzuan Hashim (PAS)	6,717	74.20%	Abdul Malik Abdullah (PEJUANG)	119	1.31%	9,210	5,101	78.65%
