= Philippine Constabulary Metropolitan Command =

Defunct regional military police unit

- Active: 1967–1991
- Country: Philippines
- Allegiance: Republic of the Philippines (1967–1991)
- Branch: Philippine Constabulary / Philippine National Police
- Type: Regional military police unit
- Garrison/HQ: Fort Bonifacio, Makati, Camp Bagong Diwa
- Nicknames: METROCOM (until 1986); CAPCOM (when renamed as Capital Command, 1987–1991)
- Engagements: Martial law in the Philippines; Mendiola massacre; 1987–1989 coups

Commanders
- Notable commanders: Brigeder General. Marino Filart (CAPCOM); Brig Gen. Alfredo Montoya (mid-60s to 1970s); Maj. Gen. Prospero Olivas (1980s); Brig. Gen. Victor Natividad (acting, '84 to '86); BGen. Ramon Montaño (CAPCOM); BGen. Alexander Aguirre (CAPCOM); BGen. Marino Filart (CAPCOM)

The Philippine Constabulary (PC) Metropolitan Command or MetroCom was created pursuant to Executive Order of President Ferdinand Marcos on July 14, 1967, to supplement police forces within the Greater Manila Area and combat all forms of criminal activity.

One of its notable unit was the Metrocom Intelligence and Security Group or MISG.

== Establishment and mission ==
In the late 1960s, mobile patrol coverage of the metropolitan Manila area was considered inadequate due to increasing crime which strained the capabilities of the local police forces. On July 14, 1967, President Ferdinand Marcos directed the organization of a special force to be known as the PC Metropolitan Command (MetroCom). It was to operate in the City of Manila, Quezon City, Caloocan and Pasay, and in the municipalities of Las Piñas, Malabon, Marikina, Makati, Mandaluyong, Navotas, Parañaque, Pasig, Pateros, San Juan, and Taguig. That time, MetroCom is also stationed in PC's main HQ, Camp Crame.

As crime continued to increase and become more severe in the greater Manila area, and smuggling and illegal fishing in Manila Bay became rampant, President Marcos issued Executive Order 120 on February 16, 1968, which expanded MetroCom into a Metropolitan Area Command (MAC). MetroCom proved to be an efficient force supporting the municipal and city police forces in the Manila area.

On July 8, 1974, President Marcos issued Presidential Decree No. 421, making MetroCom the basis for a regional police command for the future Metro Manila region. All local police departments within the capital area were joined under national government control as the Metropolitan Police Force (MPF) and overseen by the commander of MetroCom. On August 8, 1975, Presidential Decree 765 was issued to integrate the Philippine Constabulary with the Integrated National Police (INP) as a renewed service branch of the Armed Forces, not just for national defense but for the protection of public security and order. With this act, MetroCom and MPF were united under joint command. By November 1975, with the formal designation of the National Capital Region, MetroCom was extended to cover what was then the municipality of Valenzuela.

== Dissolution and replacement ==
Following the People Power Revolution in 1986, the PC-INP was replaced by the Philippine National Police (PNP) by an act of Congress in 1991. From 1986 to 1991, in line with the democratization of the police forces, MetroCom was renamed the PC Capital Region Command (PC CAPCOM).

In 1992, it was again renamed the PNP Capital Region Command (PNP CAPCOM), one formerly led by General Mariano "Marino" Filart. PNP CAPCOM was renamed in mid-1990s as National Capital Region Police Office (NCRPO).

== Equipment ==
The PC MetroCom used the Toyota Crown, the Datsun 2000, the Mini-Moke, and the Sakbayan..

== Notable officials and officers ==
=== Commanders, PC METROCOM/CAPCOM ===
- Brig Gen. Alfredo Montoya, MetroCom chief during the early days of Martial Law, and a "Rolex 12" member. (1967–1980)
- Maj. Gen. Prospero Olivas, MetroCom chief at the time of the assassination of Ninoy Aquino on 21 August 1983. He was charged and tried along with several other high-ranking officials over the murder but was acquitted in 1985. He defected to dissident military forces during the overthrow of President Marcos in the People Power Revolution in 1986 but was retired shortly afterwards and was linked to attempts to overthrow the government of President Corazon Aquino. He was already the chief by 1981. (1980–1984)
- BGen. Victor Natividad (1984–1986)
- BGen. Ramon Montaño, the commander of then renamed-Capital Command (CAPCOM). He is the commander when the Mendiola massacre happened and first part of coups against President Corazon Aquino. (1986–1989)
- BGen. Alexander Aguirre, succeed General Montaño. (1989–1990)
- BGen. Mariano "Marino" Filart, the last commander. (1990–1991)

=== Others ===
- Brig. Gen. Tomas Karingal, Chief of the MetroCom's Northern Police District (police unit for CAMANAVA area and then-includes Quezon City) from (1975–1984). He was assassinated by the New People's Army in 1984.
- Col. Rolando Abadilla, the commander of the Metrocom Intelligence and Security Group (MISG).
- Panfilo Lacson, a former Senator and retired police officer who served in the MISG as its deputy commander.
- Reynaldo Berroya, a deceased train administrator and retired police officer like Lacson, served in the MISG as its deputy commander.
- Roberto "Bobby" Ortega, a deceased local government politician and retired police officer like Lacson and Berroya, served in the MISG as its deputy commander.

== Sources ==
- The Constable, July 1971 Edition
