= Binondo Central Bank =

Dual exchange rate system

Agency overview
- Formed: November 1983
- Dissolved: February 26, 1986

The Binondo Central Bank (BCB) was a Filipino government dual exchange rate system that operated between 1983 and 1986. It was established to allow the government to narrow the rate gap by directly intervening in black market currency prices.

The government of the Philippines organized the BCB under then Trade Secretary Roberto Ongpin, with a mandate to close the gap between the US dollar vs the Philippine Peso's official guiding rate and the black market rate. Ongpin was later charged with illegally acquiring Philippine pesos through the BCB but this case was dismissed in 2016.

== History ==
The BCB was established in November 1983 at the time when the country was experiencing a debt crisis following the assassination of Benigno Aquino Jr. Financial institutions and banks were experiencing scarce foreign reserves at that particular period. It was organized by the Ferdinand Marcos government led by then Minister of Trade and Industry Roberto V. Ongpin with collaboration with other Filipino-Chinese businessmen.

Following the People Power Revolution, the organization was purportedly made defunct on February 26, 1986. However, during an August 2001 Senate of the Philippines hearing on illegal drug trafficking, former Philippine National Police undercover agent Mary "Rosebud" Ong alleged that BCB continued as an informal currency spot market run out of Manila’s Chinese district of Binondo, and was frequently used by businessmen to obtain foreign exchange for transactions they did not want to appear on the official Philippines financial system. Ong further alleged to have used the BCB in the late 1990's to facilitate billions of pesos worth of drug transactions with Hong Kong based 14K Triads on behalf of senior PNP officials such as Ping Lacson and Romeo Acop.

== Forfeiture case ==
Ongpin was charged by the Presidential Commission on Good Government in July 1987 with illegally acquiring ₱1,649,734 through the BCB. The prosecutors also asked the Sandiganbayan to order Ongpin for the money's return as well as charge him additional ₱50 billion in moral damages and ₱1 billion in exemplary damages. The other named defendants of the case were Imelda Marcos, Fabian Ver, as well as five of Ver's children.

They were alleged by the government at that time to have used the BCB in buying millions of US dollars for deposit in foreign banks for their own gain. The marking of exhibits was completed in 2001 while Ongpin finished his presentation of evidence in 2007. In April 2009, Ongpin asked the Sandiganbayan to dismiss the case saying that the government has failed to prove that he used the organization for his financial gain or caused " grave and irreparable damage" to the government. He filed a motion for the closure of the forfeiture case' filed against him in December 2009.

The case was dismissed in a ruling by the Sandiganbayan dated January 19, 2016.
