= Guar Sanji =

State constituency in Perlis, Malaysia

Guar Sanji (N13)
Perlis constituency

State constituency
- Legislature: Perlis State Legislative Assembly
MLA
Vacant
- Constituency created: 1984
- First contested: 1986
- Last contested: 2022

Demographics
- Electors (2018): 11,510

Guar Sanji is a state constituency in Perlis, Malaysia, that has been represented in the Perlis State Legislative Assembly.

The state constituency was created in 1984. It was first contested in 1986 and is mandated to return a single Assemblyman to the Perlis State Legislative Assembly under the first-past-the-post voting system. Since 2018, the State Assemblyman for Guar Sanji is Mohd Ridzuan Hashim from Parti Islam Se-Malaysia (PAS).

== Definition ==
=== Polling districts ===
According to the federal gazette issued on 31 October 2022, the Guar Sanji constituency is divided into 6 polling districts.

State constituency	Polling Districts	Code	Location
Guar Sanji (N13)	Guar Sanji	003/13/01	SK Arau
Guar Sanji (N13)	Kampong Sena	003/13/02	SK Jelempok
Guar Sanji (N13)	Behor Mentalon	003/13/03	SMK Syed Ahmad
Guar Sanji (N13)	Chemumar	003/13/04	SK Raja Perempuan Budriah
Guar Sanji (N13)	Serdang	003/18/05	SK Kampong Serdang
Guar Sanji (N13)	Changkat Jawi	003/13/06	SK Changkat Jawi

== Demographics ==
Ethnic breakdown of Guar Sanji's electorate as of 2022
1. Malay (96.8%)
2. Chinese (2.28%)
3. Other ethnicities (0.50%)
4. Indian (0.39%)

Total electors by polling district in 2016
Polling district	Electors
Guar Sanji	1,878
Kampong Sena	1,810
Behor Mentalon	1,261
Chemumar	1,035
Serdang	1,804
Changkat Jawi	743
Total	8,531
Source: Malaysian Election Commission

== History ==
Members of the Legislative Assembly for Guar Sanji
Assembly	No	Years	Member	Party
Constituency created from Oran, Bandar Arau and Kurong Anai
7th	N12	1986–1990	Taib Ismail	BN (UMNO)
8th	N12	1990–1995	Abdul Aziz Saad	BN (UMNO)
9th	N13	1995–1999	Arof Saad	BN (UMNO)
10th	N13	1999–2004	Ahmad Ali	PAS
11th	N13	2004–2008	Jafperi Othman	BN (UMNO)
12th	N13	2008–2013	Jafperi Othman	BN (UMNO)
13th	N13	2013–2018	Jafperi Othman	BN (UMNO)
14th	N13	2018–2020	Mohd Ridzuan Hashim	PAS
14th	N13	2020–2022	Mohd Ridzuan Hashim	PN (PAS)
15th	N13	2022–2025	Mohd Ridzuan Hashim	PN (PAS)
15th	N13	2025	Mohd Ridzuan Hashim	Independent
15th	N13	2025–present	Vacant	

== Election results ==
Perlis state election, 2022: Guar Sanji
Party	Candidate	Votes	%	∆%
PN	Mohd Ridzuan Hashim	6,717	74.20	▲74.20
BN	Rozieana Ahmad	1,616	17.85	▼20.02
PH	Hasparizal Hassan	601	6.64	▲6.64
PEJUANG	Abdul Malik Abdullah	119	1.31	▲1.31
Total valid votes		9,053	100.00	
Total rejected ballots		140		
Unreturned ballots		17		
Turnout		9,210	78.65	▼5.02
Registered electors		11,510		
Majority		5,101	56.35	▲52.03
PN hold		Swing		

Perlis state election, 2018: Guar Sanji
Party	Candidate	Votes	%	∆%
PAS	Mohd Ridzuan Hashim	3,199	42.19	▼1.67
BN	Afifi Osman	2,871	37.87	▼18.27
PKR	Baridah Che Nayan	1,512	19.94	▲19.94
Total valid votes		7,582	100.00	
Total rejected ballots		103		
Unreturned ballots		40		
Turnout		7,725	83.67	▼3.90
Registered electors		9,233		
Majority		328	4.32	▼7.96
PAS gain from BN		Swing		?

Perlis state election, 2013: Guar Sanji
Party	Candidate	Votes	%	∆%
BN	Jafperi Othman	4,235	56.14	▲0.96
PAS	Zulmi Sabri	3,308	43.86	▼0.96
Total valid votes		7,543	100.00	
Total rejected ballots		82		
Unreturned ballots		14		
Turnout		7,639	87.57	▲3.27
Registered electors		8,723		
Majority		927	12.28	▲1.92
BN hold		Swing		
Source(s) "Federal Government Gazette - Notice of Contested Election, State Legislative Assembly for the State of Perlis [P.U. (B) 185/2013]" (PDF). Attorney General's Chambers of Malaysia. 26 April 2013. "Federal Government Gazette - Results of Contested Election and Statements of the Poll after the Official Addition of Votes, State Constituencies for the State of Perlis [P.U. (B) 226/2013]" (PDF). Attorney General's Chambers of Malaysia. 22 May 2013.

Perlis state election, 2008: Guar Sanji
Party	Candidate	Votes	%	∆%
BN	Jafperi Othman	3,736	55.18	▲4.08
PAS	Ahmad Adnan Fadzil	3,034	44.82	▼4.08
Total valid votes		6,770	100.00	
Total rejected ballots		93		
Unreturned ballots		16		
Turnout		6,879	84.30	▼2.09
Registered electors		8,160		
Majority		702	10.36	▲8.16
BN hold		Swing		

Perlis state election, 2004: Guar Sanji
Party	Candidate	Votes	%	∆%
BN	Jafperi Othman	3,378	51.10	▲6.10
PAS	Ahmad Ali	3,233	48.90	▼6.10
Total valid votes		6,611	100.00	
Total rejected ballots		97		
Unreturned ballots				
Turnout		6,708	86.39	▲2.07
Registered electors		7,765		
Majority		145	2.20	▼7.80
BN gain from PAS		Swing		?

Perlis state election, 1999: Guar Sanji
Party	Candidate	Votes	%	∆%
PAS	Ahmad Ali	3,318	55.00	▲7.82
BN	Azib Saad	2,715	45.00	▼7.82
Total valid votes		6,033	100.00	
Total rejected ballots		123		
Unreturned ballots		1		
Turnout		6,157	84.32	▲6.68
Registered electors		7,302		
Majority		603	10.00	▲4.36
PAS gain from BN		Swing		?

Perlis state election, 1995: Guar Sanji
Party	Candidate	Votes	%	∆%
BN	Arof Saad	2,791	52.82	▼11.52
PAS	Bahari Ali	2,493	47.18	▲11.52
Total valid votes		5,284	100.00	
Total rejected ballots		91		
Unreturned ballots		5		
Turnout		5,380	77.64	▲0.97
Registered electors		6,929		
Majority		298	5.64	▼23.04
BN hold		Swing		

Perlis state election, 1990: Guar Sanji
Party	Candidate	Votes	%	∆%
BN	Abdul Aziz Saad	3,167	64.34	▲0.06
PAS	Bahari Ali	1,755	35.66	▼0.06
Total valid votes		4,922	100.00	
Total rejected ballots		184		
Unreturned ballots		0		
Turnout		5,106	76.67	▲3.19
Registered electors		6,660		
Majority		1,412	28.68	▲0.12
BN hold		Swing		

Perlis state election, 1986: Guar Sanji
Party	Candidate	Votes	%
BN	Taib Ismail	2,697	64.28
PAS	Mahamood Mohd Noor	1,499	35.72
Total valid votes		4,196	100.00
Total rejected ballots		177	
Unreturned ballots		0	
Turnout		4,373	73.48
Registered electors		5,951	
Majority		1,198	28.56
This was a new constituency created.
