= Metrocom Intelligence and Security Group =

Military intelligence unit of the Philippine Constabulary Metropolitan Command

- Active: 1967–1991
- Country: Philippines
- Allegiance: Republic of the Philippines (1967–1991)
- Branch: Philippine Constabulary
- Type: Military police intelligence unit
- Part of: Metropolitan Command (METROCOM)
- Garrison/HQ: Fort Bonifacio, Taguig
- Nickname(s): MISG

Commanders
- Notable commanders: Col. Rolando Abadilla

The Metrocom Intelligence and Security Group (MISG) was the branch of the Philippine Constabulary's Metropolitan Command under the administration of President Ferdinand Marcos. It was responsible for maintaining peace and order though its unit tasked with going after insurgents was linked to human rights violations at the time. It was headed by Rolando Abadilla.

== History ==
The MISG was formerly formed as the Metrocom Police Intelligence Service (MPIS). But when Abadilla was appointed, he expanded the group.

== Branches of MISG ==
The Branches of the MISG was Administration Branch, Police Intelligence Branch, Security Branch, Technical Intelligence Branch and Light Reaction Units.

== Notable Deputies ==
Colonel Abadilla's notable deputies are: Colonel Roberto "Bobby" Ortega, Colonel Reynaldo Berroya and then-Colonel Panfilo "Ping" Lacson.

== Notable cases ==
The MISG was assigned to rescue the then-kidnapped Robina Gokongwei, daughter of the tycoon John Gokongwei. The team assigned to save Gokongwei's daughther was Ping Lacson.
