= Guardians Brotherhood =

Filipino socio-civic fraternity

- GBI
- Founded: April 1976; 50 years ago Parang, Maguindanao del Norte
- Type: Professional
- Affiliation: Independent
- Status: Active
- Emphasis: Military
- Scope: International
- Nickname: Guardians
- Former name: Diablo Squad; Diablo Squad the Crime Busters
- Headquarters: Rosemont Executive Villas Blk1, Lot 11; Paoay, Ilocos Norte 2902; Philippines

The Guardians Brotherhood is a professional socio-civic service fraternity established in the Philippines in 1976. It is considered one of the country's largest and most respected fraternities, with members primarily drawn from the military, police, government services, law, legislature, judiciary, and security sectors.

At present, numerous factions and branches carry the name "Guardians," all under the umbrella of the Guardians Brotherhood. All of the branches stemmed from the Diablo Squad, which was founded by Sgt. Leborio "GMF Abraham" Jangao Jr., along with ten other members from the then Philippine Constabulary (now Philippine National Police). The group, which started as a military fraternal organization, eventually took in civilian members in 1980 with the so-called Magic Group ("Mg" Mark Skin) or Magic Five, which is composed of prosecutors and lawyers. In 1984, the then Diablo Squad Crime Busters changed and registered under the name Guardians Brotherhood Inc.

== History ==
Guardians Brotherhood was first known as the "Diablo Squad" (DS) organization in 1976 and originally had eleven members with Sgt. Leborio "GMF Abraham" Jangao, Jr., as its founder. As detachment commander at that time in Sitio Kidama, Parang, Maguindanao, Sgt Jangao conceived the DS as a fraternity of soldiers carrying with them the symbol of strong Brotherhood, Unity, Solidarity, and Oneness, and with these principles, he was able to convince his men to join the group.

In 1979, Sgt. Jangao met Capt. Gil "Lapu-Lapu" Taojo, Jr. and Capt. Anastacio "Patton" Labitad of the Philippine Army, in Lanao del Norte, and recruited them into the fraternity. In 1981, the DS was renamed into Diablo Squad, the Crime Busters (DSCB), with Lt. Gil ‘SGF Lapulapu” Taojo Jr. drafted the original Constitution and By-laws of the DSCB. Moreover, the original Magic Group, known as the Magic 5, was organized as the first civilian members of the DS Crime Buster. They were all lawyers who served as the Advisory Group of the DSCB Organization. The DSCB was registered under the name Diablo Squad Brotherhood Association Inc. in 1984.

At the time, the group was considered a threat to national security is “An Army within the Army" An Army doing Police Work or a Police doing Military Work not to be confused with the (MP) Military Police, raising the Phrase "the missiles are for the army, and the revolver is for the burglary", with more or less 25,000 members from the Armed Forces of the Philippines and Integrated National Police (now Philippine National Police). Then Lt. Gen.Fidel V. Ramos engineered the disbandment of the group. The officers renamed and registered the group as Guardians Brotherhood Inc.(GBI) with SEC Reg No. 123899 on December 10, 1984. Its constitution and bylaws were authored by Taojo.

Subsequently, the Guardians Centre Foundation Inc. (GCFI) was created as the financial arm of GBI to generate funds and or extend assistance to the members who are financially handicapped and the widows of members who died in combat. In 1986, some misguided elements of the AFP and members of GBI (Guardians Luzon) were deployed by RAM SFP YOU led by Col. Gregorio Honasan in a series of coup d’ etat against the administration of the late President Ferdinand Marcos and President Corazon Aquino.

The GCFI, without prior approval of the GBI hierarchy, was registered with the SEC Reg. No. 132118 in 1986, with Honasan as one of the incorporators. This misled some of its members about the existence of GBI, with the GCFI becoming the first “breakaway group” from the mother fraternal association.

Later in 1987, persecution against the GBI members by some unscrupulous Officers became especially severe during the time of General Rodolfo Biazon as Chief of Staff of the AFP. Some unscrupulous field commanders in Mindanao, particularly in the Army Commands, strictly and severely enforced the directive of the Higher Command that non–erasure of GBI markings shall mean non–reenlistment into the Regular Force of the AFP. Sensing the immediate needs of the GBI's Organic members (uniformed men and women in the AFP/PNP) protection, the group's Region XI Chapter hierarchy called for a Regional Convention sometime in 1989, purposely to circumvent the said unabated worsening situation. The focal point of the said amendment was centered on the conversion of the GBI organization from a military fraternity to a civilian-led organization known as a non-governmental organization similar to some other civilian organizations.

Sometime on May 11, 1991, MFGF Leborio “Abraham” Jangao Jr. called for a conference at Sta Ana Central Fire Station, Davao City purposely to implement the Constitution and Bylaws of the TRIAD: DSCB, GBI, and GMG, wherein Guardians Philippines Inc.(GPI) later became the umbrella organization without the benefit of SEC approval or the amendments of the original GBI and/or new registration. In 2000, then-Senator Gringo Honasan, the Interim National Chairman for Guardians Unification, hosted another National Guardians Unification Convention in Pasay City.

The result of the attempt to unify all factions of the Guardians or Guardians Unification was the establishment of the Philippine Guardians Brotherhood Inc. (PGBI). Unfortunately, the Founders opposed the Constitution and Bylaws of the PGBI as almost 85% of its provisions were copied from the PGI version promulgated during the Davao National Convention for Guardians Unification. Under the PGBI Constitution and Bylaws, the role and functions of the Founders are merely advisory and cannot hold vital or key positions in the Administration of the PGBI. Hence, adverse reaction from the Original Founders particularly FSGF Gil “Lapulapu” Taojo Jr. who was greatly disappointed on the outcome of the said Constitution and Bylaws supposedly for Guardians Unification. Hence, more branches and factions arise in the later years, all bearing the name of the "Guardians."

== Governance ==
The fraternity's headquarters are located in the Rosemont Executive Villas in Paoay, Ilocos Norte.

== Notable members ==
- Rodrigo Duterte – 16th President of the Republic of the Philippines, former mayor of Davao City, and lawyer
- Jesus Dureza – former Presidential Peace Adviser, lawyer, and broadcast journalist
- Paolo Duterte – Congressman and former vice mayor of Davao City
- Gregorio Honasan – Secretary of Department of Information and Communications Technology, politician, and former military officer
- PBGen. Hansel Marantan - chief of Highway Patrol Group
- Reynaldo Berroya – Undersecretary of Department of Transportation (Philippines), administrator of Light Rail Transit Authority, and police officer
- Guillermo Eleazar – former PNP Chief General
- Francis Escudero – former governor of Sorsogon, senator, and a lawyer
- Lito Lapid - senator and actor
- Manny Pacquiao – professional boxer and politician
- Avelino Razon – former Philippine National Police chief

== See also ==
- List of fraternities and sororities in the Philippines
