= Statutory declaration =

Legal statement of truth

A statutory declaration is a legal document defined under the law of certain Commonwealth nations and in the United States. It is similar to a statement made under oath, but it is not sworn.

Statutory declarations are commonly used to allow a person to declare something to be true for the purposes of satisfying some legal requirement or regulation when no other evidence is available. They are thus similar to affidavits, which, however, are made on oath.

Depending on jurisdiction, statutory declarations can be used for:

- Declarations of identity, nationality, marital status, etc. when documentary evidence is unavailable.
- Declaring the intention to change one's name.
- Affirming the provenance and nature of goods for export or import.
- Statements of originality for patent applications.

== Australia ==
Australian law defines a statutory declaration as a written statement declared to be true in the presence of an authorised witness. The Statutory Declarations Act 1959 governs the use of statutory declarations in matters involving the law of the Australian Commonwealth, Australian Capital Territory, and other territories but not including the Northern Territory.

Any person within the jurisdiction of this law may make a statutory declaration in relation to any matter. The declaration may be used in connection with matters of law, including judicial proceedings, but what weight is given to the declaration is a matter for the judge to decide.

Statutory declarations must be made in a prescribed form and witnessed by a person as specified in the Statutory Declarations Regulations 2023. Prescribed witnesses include people on the roll of the High Court or the Supreme Court of a State or Territory, legal or medical practitioners, justices of the peace, notaries public, police officers, military officers, registered members of certain professional organisations (e.g. National Tax Accountant's Association or Engineers Australia), and certain other Commonwealth employees.

Intentionally making a false statement as a statutory declaration is a crime equivalent to perjury, and punishable by fines and/or a prison sentence of up to four years.

The states and territories of Australia each have their own laws regarding statutory declarations.

== Canada ==
In Canadian jurisdictions, statutory declarations are statements of facts written down and attested to by the declarant before individuals who are authorized to administer oaths except that they are normally used outside of court settings. They have the same effect in law as a sworn statement or affidavit. In federal proceedings, the form is governed by the Canada Evidence Act. Similar provision is made by the various provinces for use in proceedings within their respective jurisdictions.

A person who makes a false declaration can be charged with perjury under the Criminal Code.

== United States ==
Although the terminology statutory declaration is not used frequently in the United States, unsworn declarations may invoke a statute that makes such a declaration the functional equivalent of a sworn affidavit.

== United Kingdom ==
Statutory declarations can be used as a method of legally changing one's name. They may be used by UK financial institutions to enable an asset of a relatively small value (usually less than £15,000) to be transferred to the executors of a will or other persons legally entitled to deal with or benefit from the estate of a person who has died.

=== England and Wales ===
Statutory Declarations Act 1835 (Note: The citation of this act by this short title was authorised by section 1 of, and the first schedule to, the Short Titles Act 1896. Due to the repeal of those provisions it is now authorised by section 19(2) of the Interpretation Act 1978.)
- Act of Parliament
- Parliament of the United Kingdom
- Long title: An Act to repeal an Act of the present Session of Parliament, intituled "An Act for the more effectual Abolition of Oaths and Affirmations taken and made in various Departments of State, and to substitute Declarations in lieu thereof, and for the more entire Suppression of voluntary and extra-judicial Oaths and Affidavits"; and to make Provisions for the Abolition of unnecessary Oaths.
- Citation: 5 & 6 Will. 4. c. 62
- Territorial extent: United Kingdom

Dates
- Royal assent: 9 September 1835
- Commencement: 1 October 1835 (Note: Section 22.)
Other legislation
Repeals/revokes	Declarations Act 1835
Amended by	Statute Law Revision Act 1874; Patents, Designs, and Trade Marks Act 1883; Statute Law Revision (No. 2) Act 1888; Statute Law Revision Act 1890; Perjury Act 1911; False Oaths (Scotland) Act 1933; Perjury Act (Northern Ireland) 1946; Pawnbrokers Act (Northern Ireland) 1954; Crown Estate Act 1961; Post Office Act 1969; Statute Law (Repeals) Act 1971; Statute Law (Repeals) Act 1973; Consumer Credit Act 1974; Magistrates' Courts Act 1980; Justice (Northern Ireland) Act 2002; Statute Law (Repeals) Act 2004

Status: Amended

Text of statute as originally enacted

Revised text of statute as amended

Text of the Statutory Declarations Act 1835 as in force today (including any amendments) within the United Kingdom, from legislation.gov.uk.

Under the Statutory Declarations Act 1835 (5 & 6 Will. 4. c. 62), a declaration can be made before anyone who is authorised by law to hear it (for example, a solicitor or legal executive), or before any justice of the peace. In addition, officers of the armed services with the equivalent rank of major and above, and British diplomatic and consular officers in post abroad, may authenticate a statutory declaration.

The person who hears the declaration need not enquire into the truth of it. That person's function is limited to hearing the declaration, and certifying that he or she has done so by signing it. If the declaration turns out to be untrue, the defendant making it may be punished for perjury.

The form of the statutory declaration is prescribed in the schedule to the act:

I (full name), do solemnly and sincerely declare that the contents of this declaration are true. And I make this declaration conscientiously believing the same to be true and by virtue of the provisions of the Statutory Declarations Act 1835.

A standard form is used for a statutory declaration; one copy will be given to the applicant and the other is held on file.

== See also ==
- Affidavit
- Sworn declaration
