= Francisco Villaroman =

Former police officer and politician

Director of Clark Development Corporation
- In office 2017–2018

Personal details
- Born: October 5, 1955
- Died: January 14, 2020 (aged 64) Quezon City
- Party: PMP (2018–2020)
- Other name: Frank
- Education: Philippine Military Academy
- Police career
- Service: Philippine National Police
- Allegiance: Philippines
- Divisions: Cagayan Valley Regional Police Office 2; Manila Police District
- Service years: 1979–2011
- Rank: Police Brigadier General

Francisco "Frank" Villaroman (October 5, 1955 – January 14, 2020) is a Filipino former police general and politician.

== Police career ==
Villaroman belongs to the Philippine Military Academy Matapat Class of 1979.

Before his graduation at PMA, he was chosen to join 5-man team of the Philippine Fencing Team who played for 8th Asian Games in Bangkok, Thailand. Villaroman also earned Masters of Management Major in Public Management in University of the Philippines, and Masters in Public Administration from 1993 to 1995 at the Manuel L. Quezon University.

In 1983, he earned Medal for Gallantry in Action, and in 1987, he earned his Distinguished Conduct Star, the second highest military award.

He served as head of intelligence and investigation branch of Bulacan Police, which he helped to neutralize Red Scorption Gang, chief of police of Caloocan. He also served as detective bureau head of Western Police District (WPD), and chief of regional intelligence and investigation division in Calabarzon in 2000s. He also served in Cagayan Valley Regional police headquarters as deputy.

On August 25, 2010, after the Manila hostage crisis, he was assigned as OIC chief of Manila Police District (formerly WPD) to replace Rodolfo Magtibay. But two days later, Villaroman was replaced by Roberto Rongavilla (a batchmate), as Villaroman was implicated to a case alleged involvement in the kidnapping of two Hong Kong drug suspects.

He served as regional director of Cagayan Valley Regional Police Office (PRO-2) from 2010 to 2011.

== Civilian and political career ==
After police career, Villaroman served as President Rodrigo Duterte's chief of the Davao City Public Safety and Command Center from 2013 to 2016. He also own and founded security agencies Black Mace 79 Security Agency Inc. and Voltron 79 Security Agency Inc. He also served as Duterte's anti-terrorism adviser.

He served as a director of Clark Development Corporation from 2017 to 2018.

In 2019, he ran as mayor of San Rafael, Bulacan, but lost to Cholo Violago, son of incumbent Cipriano Violago, who is tagged in the president's narco-list.

== Personal life ==
He is married with Judith Villamor Zaraspe and the couple have 3 children: Frederick, Farrah Clare, and Franco.

He died on January 14, 2020, in Quezon City, after battling colon cancer and interred in Davao City.

== Electoral performance ==
=== 2019 ===
San Rafael mayoral election
Party	Candidate	Votes	%
Lakas	Goto Violago	36,508	76.55
PMP	Frank Villaroman	11,180	23.44
Total votes		47,688	100
Lakas hold			
