= Position paper =

Essay which presents an opinion and arguments for it

A position paper (sometimes position piece for brief items) is an essay that presents an arguable opinion about an issue – typically that of the author or some specified entity. Position papers are published in academia, politics, law and other domains. The goal of a position paper is to convince the audience that the opinion presented is valid and worth listening to. Ideas for position papers that one is considering need to be carefully examined when choosing a topic, developing an argument, and organizing the paper.

Position papers range from the simplest format of a letter to the editor, through to the most complex in the form of an academic position paper. Position papers are also used by large organizations to make public the official beliefs and recommendations of the group.

== Academia ==
Position papers in academia enable discussion on emerging topics without the experimentation and original research normally present in an academic paper. Commonly, such a document will substantiate the opinions or positions put forward with evidences from an extensive objective discussion of the topic.

== Political science position paper ==
A position paper lies somewhere on a spectrum between a green paper and a white paper because it affirms opinions and proposes solutions without specifying exactly how they should be implemented.

Position papers can lead to a deep understanding of the views of another person or organization which is why they are commonly used by political campaigns, government organizations, in the diplomatic world, and in efforts to change values (e.g. through public service announcements) and organisational branding. They are used in the government of the European Union. They are an important part of the Model United Nations process.

== Law ==
In international law, the term for a position paper is an aide-mémoire, a memorandum setting forth the minor points of a proposed discussion or disagreement, used especially in undiplomatic communications.
