= Reynaldo Berroya =

Retired police general and deceased train administrator

Retired Police Director Reynaldo Berroya

Administrator of the Light Rail Transit Authority
- In office January 2021 – November 15, 2021

Personal details
- Born: Reynaldo Ignacio Berroya; March 11, 1947 Philippines
- Died: November 15, 2021 (aged 74)
- Education: Philippine Military Academy
- Police career
- Service: Philippine National Police
- Allegiance: Philippines
- Divisions: Police Regional Office 3 (Central Luzon); Intelligence Group
- Service years: 1969–2003
- Rank: Police Director

Ret. PMGen. Reynaldo "Rey" Ignacio Berroya (born March 11, 1947 – November 15, 2021) was a Filipino retired police officer who served as the Administrator of the Light Rail Transit Authority.

== Police service ==
=== Early years ===
Originally from Bulacan, Berroya was a cadet member of Philippine Military Academy Class of 1969 and subsequently served as Colonel Rolando Abadilla's deputy in the Metrocom Intelligence and Security Group of the Philippine Constabulary during the Martial Law era.

He joined the August 1987 coup attempt led by Colonel Gringo Honasan against President Corazon Aquino. Together with Major Manuel Divina, he led rebelling Philippine Constabulary officers in seizing Camp Olivas in San Fernando, Pampanga. Following the coup's failure, Berroya surrendered to authorities on November 27, 1987 and was sentenced in 1989 by a court martial to eight years imprisonment for his participation in the coup.

=== Task Force Lawin ===
After the administration of President Fidel V. Ramos created the Presidential Anti-Crime Commission (PACC) in 1993 and appointed then-Vice President Joseph Estrada as its chairman, Berroya was assigned to lead Task Force Lawin, while Philippine National Police (PNP) colonel Panfilo Lacson was the leader of Task Force Habagat. They led operations against kidnapping syndicates targeting Filipino Chinese people. However, Lacson later implicated Berroya as for plotting the kidnapping of Taiwanese businessman Jack Chou in 1993. On July 28, 1995, the Makati RTC convicted Berroya and two others for the abduction, and sentenced them to life imprisonment. The ruling was later overturned by the Supreme Court in 1997.

=== Aftermath ===
While stationed in the PNP Caraga Regional Office, Berroya was fired by Lacson, by then the Chief of the Philippine National Police, for being absent without official leave (AWOL). After the Second EDSA Revolution, Berroya implicated Lacson on the kidnapping of husband of whistleblower Mary "Rosebud" Ong. But Lacson, then a senatorial candidate responded that Berroya was Rosebud's "handler".

Berroya became the chief of the PNP Intelligence Group on July 14, 2001. Lacson commented that Berroya's appointment was a "mockery of the entire police service" and compared it to "appointing a convicted rapist and child molester to head the Department of Social Welfare and Development." On April 18, 2001, Berroya was appointed as regional director of the Central Luzon Regional Police Office and received his first star rank as Police Chief Superintendent.

== Civilian career ==
After retiring from the PNP in 2003, Berroya was appointed by President Gloria Macapagal-Arroyo to become head of the Land Transportation Office. Over the succeeding years, he held several other positions in government such as general manager of the Metro Rail Transit-3, head of the Land Transportation Franchising and Regulatory Board (LTFRB) and assistant secretary for special concerns and undersecretary for communications of the Department of Transportation and Communications.

Berroya was later appointed as a member of the board of the Light Rail Transit Authority (LRTA), and was unanimously named its administrator by the board in January 2017. He led efforts in improving the service of LRT-1 and LRT-2.

== Personal life and death ==
Berroya was married to environmentalist Inday Berroya and had two daughters. He was a member of the Guardians Brotherhood, a socio-civic service fraternity, and was nicknamed "SGF Cobra". He was friends with President Rodrigo Duterte, whom he openly endorsed during his presidential campaign in 2016.

Berroya died on November 15, 2021.
