= Sworn declaration =

Type of legally-binding declaration

A sworn declaration (also called a sworn statement or a statement under penalty of perjury) is a document that recites facts pertinent to a legal proceeding. It is very similar to an affidavit but is not witnessed nor sealed by an official such as a notary public. Instead, the person making the declaration signs a separate endorsement paragraph at the end of the document, stating that the declaration is made under penalty of perjury.

In legal proceedings, generally, facts that rely upon an individual's memory or knowledge are most reliably proven by having the person give testimony in court: he appears in person before a judge at a time and place known to other interested persons, swears that his testimony will be true, states his testimony so that all can hear it, and can be cross-examined by opposing parties. Generally, the written record of his testimony is taken down in written form by an official of the court, the court reporter.

In recent years, however, to provide for even greater economy of time and money, courts have increasingly allowed persons to omit the step of swearing before a notary public or official. Instead, the affiant puts a separate paragraph at the end of the document, such as the following (for United States federal courts):

I declare (or certify, verify, or state) under penalty of perjury that the foregoing is true and correct. Executed on (date).

Where allowed, such an endorsement gives the document the same weight as an affidavit, per 28 U.S.C. § 1746 The document is called a sworn declaration or sworn statement instead of an affidavit, and the maker is called a "declarant" rather than an "affiant", but other than this difference in terminology, the two are treated identically by the court.

A sworn declaration used in place of an affidavit must be specifically authorized by statute. The federal courts and a few states have general statutes allowing a sworn declaration in any matter where an affidavit can be used. In other cases, sworn statements are allowed for some purposes, but not others.

== See also ==
- Affidavit
- Oath
- Statutory declaration
