= Presidential Anti-Organized Crime Commission =

Government agency in the Philippines

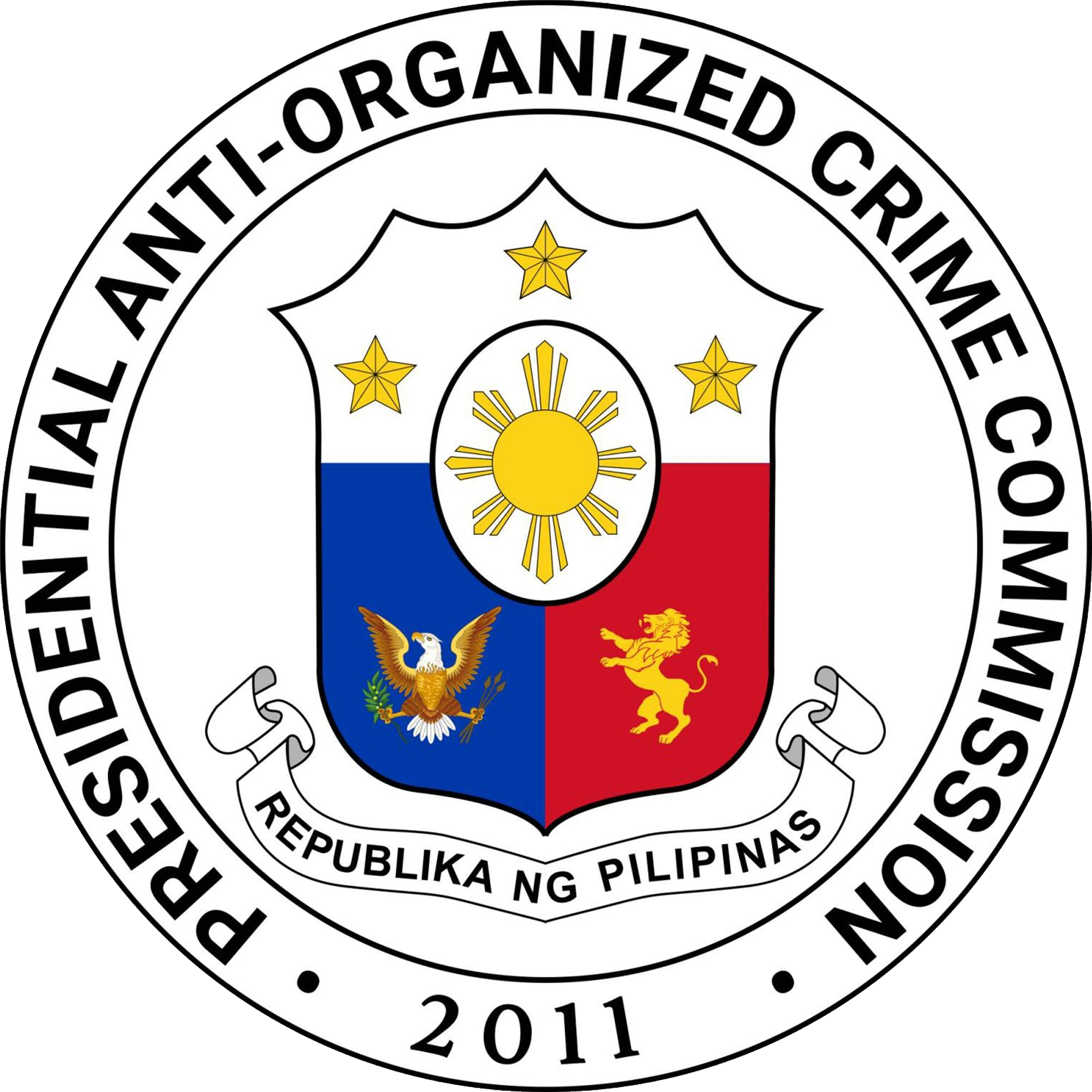
- Seal

Agency overview
- Formed: July 7, 1992 (as PACC); July 22, 1998 (as PAOCC)
- Jurisdiction: Philippines
- Headquarters: Camp Crame, Quezon City, Metro Manila
- Agency executive: Benjamin Acorda Jr., Executive director
- Parent agency: Office of the President of the Philippines
- Key documents: Executive Order No. 3, s. 1992; Executive Order No. 46, s. 2011

The Presidential Anti-Organized Crime Commission (PAOCC) is a government agency tasked to combat organized crime in the Philippines.

== History ==
=== PACC under Estrada ===
President Fidel V. Ramos issued Executive Order (EO) No. 3 on July 7, 1992 creating the Presidential Anti-Crime Commission (PACC). It was made when the proliferation of kidnapping-for-ransom crime is viewed as a national public concern. Ramos appointed Vice President Joseph Estrada as the chairman of the commission.

Estrada assigned Senior Superintendent Reynaldo Berroya to lead Task Force Lawin, while Senior Superintendent Panfilo Lacson was the leader of Task Force Habagat. They led operations against kidnapping syndicates targeting Filipino Chinese people.

However, Lacson later implicated Berroya as for plotting the kidnapping of Taiwanese businessman Jack Chou in 1993. On July 28, 1995, the Makati RTC convicted Berroya and two others for the abduction, and sentenced them to life imprisonment. The ruling was later overturned by the Supreme Court in 1997.

=== Kuratong Baleleng rubout ===
On May 18, 1995, PACC operatives chasing Kuratong Baleleng, a notorious syndicate known for robbing multiple banks in the Metropolitan Manila. The Anti-Bank Robbery Task Force of PACC is tasked to monitor Kuratong. The syndicate was spotted by the task force in a van and were pursued. A shootout occurred while the syndicate passed a road in Quezon City in the early morning until they reached Commonwealth Avenue, where they clashed with the police officers. In a press conference, reports said that the police officers had only intercepted the syndicate when they were routing to their hideout; the policemen involved did not sustain any injuries. Immediate investigation occurred which was led by Senate and a PNP directorate.

It was reported that some of the bodies of the syndicate members had been handcuffed behind their backs, and some police officers put two ArmaLites inside the van full of bullet holes. An insight to the story that contradicted the official report and affirmed that police had actually executed the bank robbers. Also, due to money involved in the case (Kuratong's robbed money), rumors spread that it had been a police-operated money heist for the Estrada.

=== PAOCC and PAOCTF ===
Estrada, shortly after succeeding Ramos as President, issued EO No. 8 on July 22, 1998 which abolished the PAAC and created the Presidential Anti-Organized Crime Commission (PAOCC) and the Presidential Anti-Organized Crime Task Force (PAOCTF). Panfilo Lacson was appointed to head both agencies.

In November 2000, Salvador "Bubby" Dacer and his driver, Emmanuel Corbito, were abducted in were abducted at the intersection of South Superhighway and Zobel Roxas Street at the city boundary of Makati and Manila, later killed, and their vehicle dumped. Three days later, Dacer's car was found abandoned in Maragondon, Cavite. Their charred remains, found in 2001 in Indang, in the same province, were positively identified. Lacson, then a candidate for Senate, who was implicated by some, denied his involvement. Some PAOCTF Luzon Unit members confessed that they have roles on the said abduction.

In a petition granted by the Court of Appeals in April 2002, P/Supt. Michael Ray Aquino, chief of operations of PAOCTF, P/Supt. Cezar Mancao II, and P/Sr. Supt. Teofilo Viña, chief of PAOCTF–Visayas, as well as another police officer, were charged as additional accused; Lopez brothers and Diloy were discharged, excluding Dumlao, to become state witnesses. Three former police generals were also included through a petition granted by the CA. Aquino, Dumlao, and Mancao were aides of then PAOCTF head Lacson.

In 2006, the Manila RTC, finding probable cause to prosecute Mancao, Aquino and 18 others for the murders, ordered the arrest of the two. But many years later, Aquino and Mancao were freed, while SPO3 Mauro Torres sentenced to life imprisonment without eligibility of a parole. Torres had admitted being the one who strangled the victims. Estrada and Lacson had been cleared of their involvement. Dumlao turned state witness in 2009 and was dropped from the list of the accused; the case against Aquino was dismissed by the Manila RTC in 2012. In January 2023, two of the suspects were arrested through warrants issued in 2001 by Manila RTC Branch 41: former SPO1 William Reed III in Pulilan, Bulacan and, nine days later, former SPO1 Rolando Lacasandile in Quezon City.

=== PAOCTF abolished ===
President Gloria Macapagal Arroyo on April 16, 2001, issued EO No. 10 abolishing PAOTCTF, which was headed then by PNP Deputy Chief Hermogenes "Jun" Ebdane. The PAOCC was retained. But by September 3, Rep. Abraham Mitra of Palawan proposed the abolishment of PAOCC to streamline bureaucracy.

=== Reorganization to present ===
The PAOCC underwent another reorganization on June 13, 2011, when EO No. 46 was issued by President Benigno Aquino III. Executive Secretary Paquito Ochoa was appointed by Aquino to be the director.

According to Police Director Benjamin Magalong, CIDG chief, four "discreet" inter-agency meetings were held to discuss and plan the raid between May and September 2014 which included the top officials of the CIDG, Philippine Drug Enforcement Agency, National Bureau of Investigation, and the Intelligence Service of the Armed Forces of the Philippines (ISAFP). Magalong narrated their first inter-agency meeting with De Lima on his proposed Cronus plan. He said he was surprised to see then Bureau of Corrections officer Rafael Ragos when no BuCor officials were supposed to be at the meeting. After pointing it out to De Lima, he said the secretary also appeared surprised and asked Ragos to leave. In another meeting, then BuCor chief Franklin Bucayu was permitted to sit in where he supposedly tried to discourage the PNP-CIDG from pushing through with the plan saying "You'll have a hard time." In a separate private meeting with Bucayo and then Presidential Anti-Organized Crime Commission (PAOCC) chief Reginald Villasanta, Magalong said Bucayo pleaded him not to carry out the raid saying "Benjie, I'm going to die!" He told Bucayo to talk to the secretary about his concern but that he would still proceed with preparing the operation. At the conclusion of the inter-agency planning, he said he was instructed by De Lima to just wait for the joint Letter of Instruction from her and Secretary of the Interior and Local Government Mar Roxas.

At a rare meeting with the secretary in an event after the planning sessions ended, Magalong said he approached De Lima to follow up on the instruction letter. He told her he was willing to be the ground commander for the operation to raid Bilibid, but the secretary again told him "Let's just wait, Benjie." Months have passed and no letter of instruction arrived. Magalong said he was shocked upon learning De Lima already carried out the Bilibid raid under a different plan (Oplan Galugad) on December 15, 2014. He expressed to the committee his dismay at being left out in the operation he proposed and planned with other PNP-CIDG and PDEA officers. Magalong said those who carried out the December 15 raid were only De Lima, Bucayo, Villasanta and General Marcelo Garbo of ISAFP with units of the PNP SAF and NCRPO (National Capital Region Police Office) as their main force. He added that none of them who were part of the planning in the CIDG and PDEA (except their K-9 dogs) were asked to take part or even advised. Magalong also expressed his frustration after finding out that some of the personalities inside the Bilibid were not included in the transfer to the NBI detention. Under the Cronus plan, he said the CIDG and PNP were supposed to raid one part of the prison controlled by Herbert Colanggo, while the other area controlled by Jaybee Sebastian would be raided by the PDEA and NBI. The high profile convicts would have also been brought and isolated in either Palawan or Zamboanga. He said none of them were implemented.

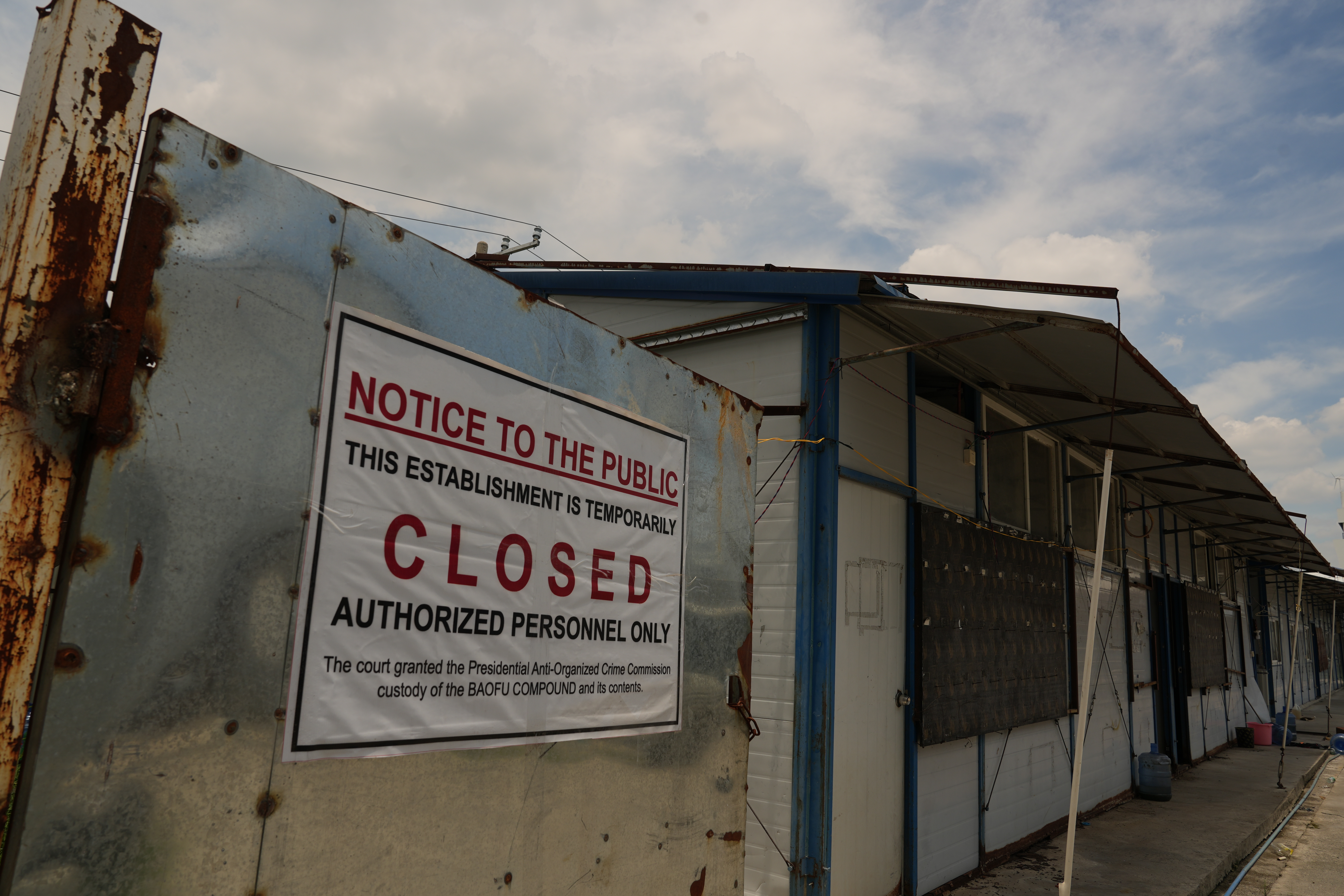
The PAOCC was granted permission by the courts to seize and close the Baofu POGO compound in Bamban, Tarlac.

PAOCC tackled the proliferation of illegal operations by Philippine offshore gaming operators (POGOs) or offshore gambling hubs in the 2020s. This led to the full ban of POGOs and the arrest of Bamban mayor Alice Guo.

== List of executive directors ==
=== As chairman of PACC (1992 to 1997) ===
Name	Term		Ref.
Name	Start	End	Ref.
Joseph Estrada	July 7, 1992	1997	

=== As director of PAOCC and PAOCTF (1998 to 2001) ===
Name	Term		Ref.
Name	Start	End	Ref.
PDGen. Panfilo Lacson	1998	2001	
PDDGen. Hermogenes Ebdane	2001	April 2001	

=== Executive directors of PAOCC (2011 to present) ===
Name	Term		Ref.
Name	Start	End	Ref.
Paquito Ochoa	June 2011	2013	
PCSUPT Reginald Villasanta	2013	2016	
Gilbert Cruz	January 2023	October 2025	
Benjamin Acorda Jr.	October 15, 2025	incumbent	
