= List of Case Unclosed episodes =

Case Unclosed was an informative news and public affairs television show in the Philippines aired every Thursday evenings by GMA Network. The show was hosted by Arnold Clavio, who previously hosted Emergency. Kara David served as the first host until March 5, 2009, when she was replaced by Clavio to host OFW Diaries.

The episodes of this programs featured different cases that are currently unsolved. The dramatization was directed by different Filipino film directors.

== List of episodes ==
=== Kara David ===
| No. overall | No. in season | Title | Directed by | Original release date |
|---|---|---|---|---|
| 1 | 1 | "Alaala ng Ozone (Memories of Ozone)" | Adolfo Alix, Jr. | October 2, 2008 |
The evening of March 18, 1996, turned to tragedy when a fire broke out in the Ozone Disco nightclub. There were 162 deaths and 95 injuries due to the resulting stampede. Some of the victims remain unidentified and the owner was held responsible for what happened.
| 2 | 2 | "Yaman ni Yamashita (Yamashita's Treasure)" | Tara Illenberger | October 9, 2008 |
One of the most controversial treasures of all time is Yamashita's treasure. Some of the treasures of General Tomoyuki Yamashita still exist. The discovery of the Golden Buddha by Roger Roxas in 1971 led to his imprisonment under dictator president Ferdinand Marcos.
| 3 | 3 | "Bakas ng Karahasan (Trace of Violence): The Chiong Murder Case" | Milo Tolentino | October 16, 2008 |
On July 16, 1997, sisters Marijoy and Jacqueline Chiong were kidnapped by unidentified persons in Cebu. Marijoy's body was found the next morning while Jacqueline remains missing. Some of the suspects came from some prominent families in Cebu.
| 4 | 4 | "The Hultman-Chapman double-murder case" | Raya Martin | October 23, 2008 |
On July 13, 1991, Maureen Hultman, Roland John Chapman and Jussi Leino were shot by Claudio Teehankee, Jr., son of former Supreme Court Chief Justice Claudio Teehankee, Sr. The case became controversial when Teehankee was released from jail.
| 5 | 5 | "Lihim ng 1897 (The Secrets of 1897)" | Paul Morales | October 30, 2008 |
On May 10, 1897, Andrés Bonifacio, known as the Supreme leader of the Katipunan, was executed, together with his brother Procopio, at Mount Buntis in Maragondon, Cavite after a military trial. Some say that Emilio Aguinaldo was responsible for the killings.
| 6 | 6 | "The Nida Blanca Murder Case" | Rember Gelera | November 6, 2008 |
On November 7, 2001, actress Nida Blanca was found dead in a building in Greenhills. Philip Medel, Jr. erroneously claims that her husband Roger Lauren Strunk, nicknamed "Rod", masterminded the crime. Strunk later died in 2007 when he reportedly fell from the second-floor balcony of a motel in Tracy, California, onto a parking lot 20 feet below. His death was ruled as suicide.
| 7 | 7 | "Kapatiran hanggang Kamatayan (lit. Fraternity Until Death or Brotherhood to Death) (also known by its English title "Death in the Fraternity")" | Rica Arevalo | November 13, 2008 |
Though many hazing cases were recorded, the 1991 death of Lenny Villa under the Aquila Legis Fraternity became the turning point for the Philippine government to sign into law RA No. 8409, known as the Anti-Hazing Law, in 1995. In 2007, Cris Mendez was killed during a hazing by members of the Sigma Rho fraternity. Both cases are still pending in court. The story focuses on the practice in most fraternities of testing the loyalty of initiates by forcing them to endure several challenges, including beatings, burnings, punchings, paddlings, and even the commission of heinous crimes like rape and sodomy.
| 8 | 8 | "Desaparecidos" | Alvin Yapan | November 20, 2008 |
The Martial Law years of the re-elected Ferdinand Marcos Sr. administration saw the disappearance and abductions of many activists with no traces of them nor their bodies. Similar incidents also occurred even after the ouster of Marcos and continued during the Arroyo administration.
| 9 | 9 | "Vizconde massacre" | Mark Shandii Bacolod | November 27, 2008 |
On June 30, 1991, Estrelita, Carmela and Jennifer Vizconde were killed inside their house in the BF Homes Subdivision of Parañaque City. Some of the suspects were initially acquitted. Four years later, Jessica Alfaro re-opened the case. But Hubert Webb, son of then-Senator Freddie Webb, was not in the Philippines when the murder occurred.
| 10 | 10 | "Dacer-Corbito murder case" | Charlie Bebs Gohetia | December 4, 2008 |
On November 24, 2000, PR man Bubby Dacer and his driver Emmanuel Corbito were kidnapped and were found dead four days later. S/Supt. Glenn Dumlao, one of the accused, named former S/Supt. Cezar Mancao and former S/Supt. Michael Ray Aquino as the brains behind the crime. Mancao and Aquino were members of Presidential Anti-Organized Crime Task Force, or PAOCTF, headed by then DGen. Panfilo Lacson.
| 11 | 11 | "Ang Pagkawala ni Geraldine Palma (The Disappearance of Geraldine Palma)" | Jay Abello | December 11, 2008 |
On August 16, 2007, the body of Geraldine Palma, a seven-year-old girl, was found in North Harbour packed in a luggage case. Some say that the nanny is responsible for her death. But there are speculations that the body found is not Geraldine Palma's.
| 12 | 12 | "Magsaysay plane crash" | Sigrid Andrea Bernardo | December 18, 2008 |
The whole Philippines and the world was shocked on March 17, 1957, when a Douglas C-47 crashed at Mount Manunggal in Cebu. One of the casualties was President Ramon Magsaysay. Officially, it was an accident due to mechanical problems. However, some claim that it was sabotage. Newspaper journalist Nestor Mata, the sole survivor in the crash, lived to tell the tale of what happened. He later died on April 12, 2018.
| 13 | 13 | "Case Unclosed: Balik Tanaw (Case Unclosed: Throwback)" | Unknown | December 25, 2008 |
This episode was the year-end special, showing three previous episodes of the show: "Yaman ni Yamashita", "Lihim ng 1897" and "Magsaysay Plane Crash".
| 14 | 14 | "Yearend Special" | Unknown | January 1, 2009 |
This episode was the Part 2 of the year-end special, showing nine previous episodes of the show: "Alaala ng Ozone", "Kapatiran hanggang Kamatayan", "Desaparecidos", "Hultman-Chapman Double Murder Case", "Dacer-Corbito Murder Case", "Nida Blanca Murder Case" "Vizconde Massacre", "Ang Bakas ng Karahasan: The Chiong Murder Case" and "Ang Pagkawala ni Geraldine Palma".
| 15 | 15 | "Gregorio del Pilar: Bayani o Berdugo? (Gregorio del Pilar: A Hero or Executioner?)" | Sari Lluch Dalena | January 8, 2009 |
On December 2, 1899, General Gregorio del Pilar was assassinated after the Battle of Tirad Pass.
| 16 | 16 | "Payatas Tragedy" | Eli Balce | January 15, 2009 |
On July 10, 2000, more than 300 people were buried alive when a mountain of garbage collapsed in Payatas. Although almost a decade has passed, no one has been held responsible and punished for what happened.
| 17 | 17 | "RCBC Massacre" | Joaquin Pedro Valdes | January 22, 2009 |
On May 16, 2008, ten lives were ended after a group of men robbed the RCBC Light and Science branch in Cabuyao, Laguna. Because victims were shot in the head, the case has been dubbed as the bloodiest bank robbery in the history of the Philippines.
| 17 | 17 | "Pestaño: suicide o murder? (Pestaño: suicide or murder?) (substitutely hosted by Ivan Mayrina)" | Maikel Cardoz | January 29, 2009 |
On September 27, 1995, Philippine Navy Ensign Philip Pestaño was found dead with a gunshot wound in his head. Officially, he committed suicide, but others say that he was murdered.
| 18 | 18 | "ULTRA Stampede (substitutely hosted by Rhea Santos)" | Anna Isabelle Matutina | February 5, 2009 |
On February 4, 2006, 73 people died and hundreds were injured in the stampede at the PhilSports Arena on the first anniversary of the ABS-CBN noontime show Wowowee. A bomb threat was speculated as the cause, but was denied by the authorities. To this day, no one has been held responsible for the tragedy. Worst of all, the Guinness World Records gave it the title of "the greatest death toll in a game show", a record which ABS-CBN still holds to this day. The question, "how do we get justice if the show's host Willie Revillame is now hosting in TV5 and later GMA?" remains unanswered.
| 19 | 19 | "Gumuhong mga Pangarap (Shattered Dreams) (substitutely hosted by Tina Panganiban-Perez)" | Sigfried Barros Sanchez | February 12, 2009 |
Education is believed to be the best legacy we can leave our children. So to ensure their children's future, thousands of Filipinos buy educational plans. In April 2005, however, 30,000 parents were alarmed when news broke out that Pacific Plans, Incorporated, one of the largest companies in the pre-need industry, had gone bankrupt and would not be able to pay for the tuition fees of its planholders.
| 20 | 20 | "Lucila Lalu: Chop Chop Lady" | Sandino Magno | February 19, 2009 |
Chop-chop. A term coined to describe what is done to easily and inconspicuously dispose of the remains of a murder victim. The term was first used in the Philippines when the dismembered body parts of Lucila Lalu were found in different cities in May 1967.
| 21 | 21 | "Jabidah Massacre" | Onin Tagaro | February 26, 2009 |
More than a hundred men… brought to the southern part of the Philippines to be secretly trained in guerrilla tactics… The year was 1967 and their mission was to infiltrate and invade Sabah, Malaysia. But early in the morning of March 18, 1968, something happened.
| 22 | 22 | "Plaza Miranda Bombing" | Kiri Lluch Dalena | March 5, 2009 |
August 21, 1983, has gone down in history as the day former Senator Ninoy Aquino was assassinated. But 12 years before Ninoy’s death, another event happened that left a deep mark on history: the Plaza Miranda Bombing.

=== Arnold Clavio ===
| No. overall | No. in season | Title | Directed by | Original release date |
|---|---|---|---|---|
| 1 | 24 | "Flor Contemplacion" | Jon Red | March 12, 2009 |
Flor Contemplacion, a 42-year-old maid, was hanged for murder. She was accused of killing Delia Maga, another OFW, and her four-year-old Singaporean ward. It was a bitter ending for Flor, as she was hanged at 6:00 on the morning of March 17, 1995, with three male drug traffickers. Suspects included Contemplacion herself, or that Delia's employer, a Singaporean Chinese man that was angry at Delia due to her negligence resulting in his son's death, killed Delia and framed Flor
| 2 | 25 | "Jailbreak" | Sasi Casas | March 19, 2009 |
On March 14, 2005, 6:30 a.m., a suspected member of the Abu Sayyaf was scheduled to be brought to court for an early hearing. As handcuffs were about to be put on him, he grabbed the jail guard's firearm and shot at other prison officers. Other imprisoned members of the Abu Sayyaf immediately got out of their cells, armed themselves and barricaded the second floor of the building at Camp Bagong Diwa in Bicutan where they were incarcerated. A prison riot and siege ensued, ending with all the Abu Sayyaf members, including some high-ranking members, killed, along with some jailguards and police officers.
| 3 | 26 | "Sino ang pumatay kay Ninoy? (Who Killed Ninoy?)" | Richard Somes | March 26, 2009 |
China Airlines flight 811 lands in Manila International Airport between late morning and early afternoon of August 21, 1983. Despite the heavy presence of more than 1,000 members of the military and police on the tarmac, along with three armed bodyguards escorting him, someone found an opportunity to fatally shoot Ninoy Aquino in the head. The man was identified as Rolando Galman at first, but reports say that Galman was innocent and made a scapegoat. Afterwards, his wife and his girlfriend vanished without a trace. The AVSECOM soldiers were later tried and imprisoned. Some were released later, but others died during the incarceration.
| 4 | 27 | "Bocaue Pagoda tragedy" | J. Pacena | April 2, 2009 |
On July 2, 1993, during the Bocaue River Festival, tragedy struck when around 500 people rode the floating pagoda, causing it to sink, killing more than 200. The pagoda float was way beyond its capacity. Despite hundreds of lives lost, no one seems to have been held accountable for the tragedy. But during the tragedy, heroism prevailed in the form of a Muslim scout volunteer named Sajid "Tansi" Bulig (1980–1993). However, after 21 years, the tradition resumed once more in 2014, with major improvements and more safe and secure measures.
| 5 | 28 | "Maricris Sioson: Namatay o Pinatay? (Maricris Sioson: Died or Killed?)" | Benji Garcia | April 16, 2009 |
On September 25, 1991, Maricris Sioson, a 22-year-old dancer, arrived in the Philippines in a casket. The Japanese government said that she died from hepatitis, but she had burns, bruises and stab wounds all over her body. Suspicion arose about her Japanese live-in partner.
| 6 | 29 | "Tara Santelices" | Jade Francis Castro | April 23, 2009 |
The night of August 6, 2008, was to be a night of joy for Ateneo de Manila University Political Science graduate Tara Santelices, as she was celebrating her birthday. On her way home to Cainta with her friend, Joee Mejias, an armed gunman mugged the jeepney they were on. Tara was shot in the head after struggling with the mugger over her bag. She was rendered comatose, and later died.
| 7 | 30 | "Dr. Jose Rizal: Kristo ng Lahing Kayumanggi? (Dr. Jose Rizal: Christ of Brown Race?)" | Ruelo Lorenzo | May 7, 2009 |
Dr. José Rizal is known as the Philippines' national hero. To some Filipinos, however, he is more than that. They consider Rizal to be the "Kristong Kayumanggi" or the "Brown Christ".
| 8 | 31 | "Cochise-Beebom Double Murder Case" | Aloy Adlawan | May 14, 2009 |
On the night of April 25, 1990, UP law graduate Ernesto "Cochise" Bernabe II and his beautiful girlfriend Anna Lourdes "Beebom" Castaños were abducted outside a restaurant where they planned to have dinner. After 19 years, the prime suspect, Rodolfo Manalili, was granted Executive Clemency although he was sentenced to double-life imprisonment.
| 9 | 32 | "Ang Pagkawala ni Edgar Bentain (The Disappearance of Edgar Bentain)" | Martin Cabrera | May 21, 2009 |
Edgar Bentain, a former PAGCOR employee became known as the one who caught then-Vice President Joseph Estrada on camera playing poker with some friends. Many years later on January 16, 1999, he just disappeared.
| 10 | 33 | "Wala na si "Neneng" ("Neneng" was Already Gone)" | Jeyow Evangelista | May 28, 2009 |
The death of a girl named Rosario Baluyot (renamed "Neneng") on November 29, 1987 wakes the country to the reality of pedophilia. Neneng and another child named Jessie Ramirez (renamed as Boyet) were sexually molested in a hotel by a foreigner named Heinrich Stefan Ritter, an Austrian medical doctor, in 1986. Ritter made Boyet masturbate and get an erection while he inserted an electric vibrator in Neneng's vagina when his penis did not fit, but the vibrator's screw broke off. Boyet sleepily saw the incident but ignored it. After the children were paid the next morning, seven months later, Neneng complained of pain in her private part. She was found unconscious on a rural sidewalk by a bystander, and with the help of a group led by a Filipino-American priest, Fr. Shay Cullen, an operation was done to remove the vibrator's screw in her cervix. Her condition worsened and she died of blood poisoning. Ritter was first convicted and sentenced for two years in prison, but the Supreme Court acquitted and deported him back to Austria. The story focused on pedophile cases. And the story goes to Pagsanjan, a thriving town for prostitution including young girls, teens and even young male rowers in Pagsanjan Falls. It also featured pictures of suspected trafficked kids.
| 11 | 34 | "Danyos (Human rights victims under Marcos dictatorship)" | Mario AV Guzman | June 4, 2009 |
More than two decades have passed since former President Ferdinand Marcos was ousted from power, but the shadow of his regime endures to this day. There are Martial Law victims requesting compensation.
| 12 | 35 | "Cherry Hills Tragedy" | Paolo Herras | June 11, 2009 |
Every family dreams to have a house of their own. This was the reason that Cherry Hills Subdivision was built for poor families who could not afford their own house. A tragedy suddenly struck the Cherry Hills residents on the night of August 3, 1999, when Typhoon Olga hits the Philippines. Because the subdivision was built on an unstable sloped ground, a landslide occurred, burying 300 homes and more than 50 people alive.
| 13 | 36 | "Brother Eli Paninirang Puri? (Brother Eli defamation person?)" | Michael Angelo Dangalan | June 18, 2009 |
Bro. Eli Soriano, the well-known televangelist and leader of Ang Dating Daan, was charged with raping Daniel Veridiano. The case was initially dismissed, but was refiled by former DOJ secretary Raul Gonzales. Today, Veridiano is a priest. Eli Soriano was in exile in Brazil, and he continued preaching while wanted in the Philippines for libel, perjury, and rape of Veridiano and others. Note: All copies of this episode was erased by MCGI for insulting their leader, and Bro. Eli Soriano, passed away in February 2021.
| 14 | 37 | "Olalia-Alay-ay Double murder case" | Ogi Suhatan | June 25, 2009 |
Kilusang Mayo Uno leader Rolando Olalia and his driver, Leonor Alay-ay, met their deaths in November 1986 when members of the Rebolusyonaryong Alyansang Makabansa were said to have killed them to wreak havoc. This was during the term of the late former President Cory Aquino, when coups d'états were being launched left and right. Suspects ranges from Government agents to disgruntled extreme leftists.
| 15 | 38 | "Antonio Luna" | Tara Illenberger | July 2, 2009 |
It was the height of the Philippine-American War, when rumours that Gen. Antonio Luna was going to launch a coup d'état against President Emilio Aguinaldo. On June 5, 1899, to prevent him from carrying out his alleged plan, soldiers close to the president hacked Gen. Luna to death. Strangely, not one of the soldiers involved in the general’s death was punished. He was shown being hacked to death by his own men.
| 16 | 39 | "PNP's Most Wanted Bong Panlilio" | EJ Salcedo | July 9, 2009 |
Jose Ma. "Bong" Panlilio was charged with the murder of brothers Albert Gutierrez and Ariel De Castro. Today, he is one of the PNP's Most Wanted criminals with a reward of 5 million pesos, with notices posted everywhere around the country. The PNP's search for Panlilio continues. He was later captured in Thailand in 2010.
| 17 | 40 | "Marlene Esperat" | Ron Bryant | July 16, 2009 |
Marlene Esperat, a former employee of the Department of Agriculture and a journalist, once dreamed of ridding the government agency she worked for of corruption. But on March 24, 2005, she was forever silenced by a single gunshot. Suspected are members of DA implied by Esperat in scams involving the department.
| 18 | 41 | "Antipolo Massacre" | Jerrold Tarog | July 23, 2009 |
Something strange happened in Sitio Kulasisi, San Luis, Antipolo, on December 3, 1993. The usually meek Winefredo Masagca went into rage and hacked five people to death. Many, including his own wife, thought he was possessed by evil spirits. But Police investigations revealed that he was a part of a heist at a farm, but had relented. He was silenced by his accomplices, who poisoned him, then murdered the sleeping neighbors in their house.
| 19 | 42 | "Tara Santelices (Part 2)" | Jade Francisco Castro | July 30, 2009 |
Tara Santelices died on July 27, 2009, after struggling to live for almost a year. Her story is told on the ABS-CBN show, Maalaala Mo Kaya in the episode "Gitara" (Guitar)
| 20 | 43 | "Melissa Roxas Story" | Ed Lejano | August 6, 2009 |
It was said to be Filipino-American Melissa Roxas’ worst nightmare: to be (allegedly) abducted and tortured. According to Melissa's account, the incident happened on May 19, 2009, when soldiers of the Armed Forces of the Philippines accused her of being a member of the New People’s Army.
| 21 | 44 | "Didith Reyes, Namatay o Pinatay? (Didith Reyes Died or Killed?)" | Earl Bontuyan | August 13, 2009 |
Many were shocked on December 10, 2008, to hear the news that former 1970s singer Didith Reyes died. The reports said she had a heart attack. Her only son, Arvey, thinks otherwise. He believes that the alleged constant beatings her mother experienced from her live-in partner, Eulogio Disongla, may have caused her death.
| 22 | 45 | "Naabong Kalinga (A Care for Children that Turned to Ashes)" | Cris Pablo | August 20, 2009 |
The midnight hours of December 3, 1998, were a time of tragedy. 28 people died and many others were rescued from the fire in the Associacion de Damas de Filipinas Settlement House. But, due to the aid of President Joseph Estrada, the Settlement House was reconstructed.
| 23 | 46 | "Overkill?" | Philip Espina | August 27, 2009 |
On November 7, 2005, a shoot-out occurred in Ortigas Avenue between members of a carnap group made up of sons of influential people and TMG. According to the Traffic Management Group of the Philippine National Police, three members of the Valle Verde Group, one of the known carnapping groups in Metro Manila, were killed by the police. The team leader is Hansel Marantan, infamous and notorious in cases like the shootout which killed a father and his daughter and the Atimonan Rubout case involving the security guards of a former Police Colonel and the police and soldiers led by Marantan.
| 24 | 47 | "Abadilla 5" | Borgy Torre III | September 3, 2009 |
On June 13, 1996, 5 men were responsible for the ambush and murder of Col. Rolando Abadilla in Katipunan Avenue, Quezon City. The suspects became known as the "Abadilla 5".
| 25 | 48 | "Ruby Rose Barrameda Story" | Vic Acedillo Jr. | September 10, 2009 |
Ruby Rose Barrameda-Jimenez, sister of former beauty queen Rochelle Barrameda, went missing on March 14, 2007. After two years, she was found in a steel case in a cement-filled drum in the sea in Navotas. The case is still open.
| 26 | 49 | "Laban ni Karen Vertido (The Battle of Karen Vertido)" | Pam Miras | September 17, 2009 |
Forty-two-year-old mother and wife Karen Vertido will never forget March 29, 1996. She claims that she was raped by her 60-year-old boss, Jose Custodio, on that date. Her grief continued when the court found Custodio not guilty of rape. In spite of the acquittal, she decided to brought her case to the United Nations. A first for a Filipina to do so.
| 27 | 50 | "Sisig Queen" | Hector Macaso | September 24, 2009 |
On April 16, 2008, Apong Lucing Cunanan was found dead inside her own home in Pampanga. Her husband and children suspect robbers came into the house to steal money and jewelry from the family vault and when they found out that she was awake, they killed her. But the police found evidences that point her husband killed her when they quarrel about her husband's obsession with gambling and the money she saved losing every time. Until now, the case is running while her husband is incarcerated.
| 28 | 51 | "Ang Pagragasa ni Ondoy (The Wrath of "Ondoy")" | Unknown | October 1, 2009 |
The Philippines was badly hit by Typhoon Ondoy. Metro Manila was heavily flooded on September 26, 2009, resulting to more than 200 deaths. Millions worth of properties were also damaged due to the raging floodwaters. With these casualties, many still wonder how it happened. What are the measures that should have been done to prevent Ondoy's wrath?, 4 years after Ondoy wrath on November 8, 2013, Super Typhoon Yolanda (strongest typhoon in history) make landfall in the Visayas region, resulting to more than 6,000 deaths.
| 29 | 52 | "Pyramid Scam" | Arnold S. Argaño | October 8, 2009 |
Because they were promised that the company would double their investments, many agreed to put their money in Multitel. Unfortunately, their get-rich-easy plans turned into one of the biggest scams in the country's history. It was called the Multitel Pyramiding Scam.
| 30 | 53 | "The December Shootout" | Elfardo | October 15, 2009 |
Tragedy struck in a Parañaque subdivision on December 5, 2008 when Jun De Vera and his daughter, Lia were killed after being allegedly caught in a crossfire between the police and a gang of criminals. Ten months after their death, Jun's widow Lilian is still crying for justice. She wants to know if there was foul play in the supposedly accidental shooting.
| 31 | 54 | "Ang Bakas ng Kahapon ni Lola (The Mark of the Past of the Grandmother)" | Arnold S. Argaño | October 22, 2009 |
It's been almost seven decades, but the worst memories of the comfort women from the Japanese Imperial army are still etched in their minds. They filed every possible case against them. Up to now, the government of Japan ignores their plea.
| 32 | 55 | "Glorietta Blast" | Ray Defrante Gibraltar | November 5, 2009 |
It has been two years since the Glorietta Mall explosion in Makati on October 19, 2007, but a lot of questions are still left unanswered. What caused the blast? Was it an accident or an act of terrorism? Until now, this case is still unclosed.
| 33 | 56 | "Ramon Pagdanganan Ambush: Sino ang may Sala? (Ramon Pagdanganan Ambush: Who is The Criminal?)" | Elfardo | November 12, 2009 |
The celebration of Calumpit, Bulacan’s fiesta two years ago on May 4, 2008 was suddenly cut short when the town’s former mayor, Ramon “Monching" Pagdanganan, younger brother of former Governor Obet Pagdanganan was ambushed. He died on the spot. Suspects include his political rival and members of NPA.
| 34 | 57 | "Walang Bakas, ang Kwento ni Ka Prudencio (No Trace, The Story of Ka Prudencio)" | Arnold Argaño | November 19, 2009 |
Prudencio Calubid along with his wife were abducted and tortured as they were going home in Samar on June 26, 2006. They say that they were abducted by the military and they are still missing and are presumed dead until now.
| 35 | 58 | "Bayani nga ba? (Is He Really a Hero?)" | Arnold Argaño | November 26, 2009 |
Some historians claim that during the last few days of December 1896, Rizal retracted all his strong views of corruption and abuse of power by the Spanish friars. If proven true, it can be a basis to question Rizal's status as our National Hero.
| 36 | 59 | "Hustisya ni Judge Gingoyon (Justice of Judge Gingoyon)" | Ric Reyes | December 3, 2009 |
Judge Henrick Gingoyon, is known for being the presiding judge in some of the most-talked issues in the Philippines, was shot dead in Bacoor, Cavite on New Year's Eve 2005. The suspect is still unknown.
| 37 | 60 | "Trahedya sa Perya (Tragedy at the Carnival)" | Arnold Argaño | December 10, 2009 |
On Christmas Day 2006, the Picardal family went to a carnival fair in Marikina. But tragedy struck Kimberly and Katherine Picardal. Reyes family was also present in the carnival, but the child was disabled by the tragedy. Both victims of the tragedy, Picardals helps Reyeses for the justice which still eludes them.
| 38 | 61 | "MV Doña Paz Tragedy" | Arnold Argaño | December 17, 2009 |
More than four thousand passengers from the provinces of Samar and Leyte boarded MV Dona Paz on December 20, 1987, all hoping to celebrate Christmas in Manila. Halfway through the travel, tragedy struck when an oil tanker collides the passenger ship. Until now, Sulpicio Lines never finished paying the damage caused by the accident.
| 39 | 62 | "Case Update" | Unknown | December 24, 2009 |
This was the year-end special, showing three previous episodes: "Dacer-Corbito Murder Case", "Ang Pagkawala ni Geraldine Palma" and "Ang Bakas ng Karahasan: The Chiong Murder Case".
| 40 | 63 | "The Mayor Resuello Murder Case" | Elfardo | January 7, 2010 |
On April 28, 2007, San Carlos, Pangasinan Mayor Julian Resuello was shot dead while attending their town fiesta.
| 41 | 64 | "Ballot Snatching" | Arnold Argaño | January 14, 2010 |
Teachers are said to be modern-day heroes during the election season. But in some cases, such momentous event could also have a tragic ending. It was dawn of May 9, 1995, when two men allegedly snatched the ballots from a group of election officers at Talaga Elementary School in Mabini, Batangas. In the middle of the commotion, Filomena Tatlonghari was shot by unidentified man.
| 42 | 65 | "The Roger Mariano Murder Case" | Arnold Argaño | January 21, 2010 |
On July 31, 2004, radio commentator Roger Mariano was ambushed by armed men while on his way home. After six years, there was no court decision on his case.
| 43 | 66 | "Ang Pagpaslang kay Ernest Santiago (The Murder of Ernest Santiago)" | Arnold Argaño | January 28, 2010 |
On December 16, 2007, fashion designer Ernest Santiago was found dead in Pagsanjan, Laguna after robbers invaded his house and killed him. After two years, the family of Santiago is still hoping for justice.
| 44 | 67 | "Bakas ng Trahedya (Marks of Tragedy)" | Unknown | February 4, 2010 |
In Part 1 of the special episode, Case Unclosed revisited the worst tragedies that besieged the nation. Cases of fire, maritime disasters and landslides that took thousands of lives and damaged millions of properties. Has anyone been made accountable for these tragedies?
| 45 | 68 | "Ang mga Kontrobersya ng Kasaysayan (The Controversies of History)" | Unknown | February 11, 2010 |
In Part 2 of the special episode, Case Unclosed revisited the controversies of history and showed the episodes "Antonio Luna", "Gregorio del Pilar, Bayani o Berdugo?", "Bayani nga ba?", "Lihim ng 1897", "Yaman ni Yamashita", "Desaparecidos", "Plaza Miranda Bombing" and "Magsaysay Plane Crash".
| 46 | 69 | "Karahasan laban sa mga Kababaihan (Violence against Women)" | Unknown | February 18, 2010 |
In the Part 3 of the special episode, Case Unclosed will revisit again the stories of violence against Women and showing the episodes are the following: "Nida Blanca Murder Case", "Sisig Queen", "Ruby Rose Barrameda Story", "Lucila Lalu: Chop-chop Lady" and "Didith Reyes: Namatay o Pinatay?".
| 47 | 70 | "Karahasan laban sa mga Kabataan (Violence against Youth)" | Unknown | February 25, 2010 |
In the final episode, Case Unclosed will revisit again the stories of violence against Youth and show the episodes are the following: "Ang Pagkawala ni Geraldine Palma" and "Wala na si "Neneng".
