= Presidency of Joseph Estrada =

Philippine presidential administration from 1998 to 2001

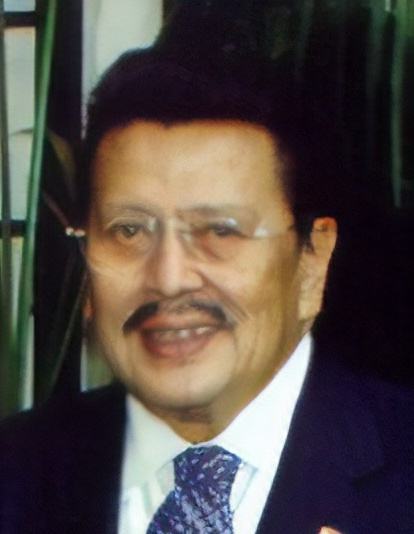
- Estrada in 1999
- Presidency of Joseph Estrada; June 30, 1998 – January 20, 2001
- President: Joseph Ejercito Estrada
- Vice President: Gloria Macapagal Arroyo
- Cabinet: See list
- Party: LAMMP
- Election: 1998
- Seat: Malacañang Palace, Manila
- Seal of the President of the Philippines (1986–1998)

Joseph Estrada began his presidency at noon on June 30, 1998, following his inauguration as the 13th president of the Philippines, succeeding Fidel Ramos. He was deposed on January 20, 2001, following the Second EDSA Revolution.

Estrada campaigned on a pro-poor platform. He ordered the removal of all sovereign guarantees on contracts for public projects which would require the sovereign Filipino people to assume the financial losses of private companies doing business with the government. He made efforts to clean the bureaucracy by ordering the immediate relief of corrupt officials in the military and police hierarchy. He ordered a wide-ranging investigation of all government contracts entered into by the previous administration to ensure these were above-board and directly advantageous to the citizenry. He also ordered the investigation of suspected big-time tax evaders including individuals who had contributed to his presidential campaign. He undertook an aggressive housing program on a national basis, targeting low-cost homes for the poor.

Estrada assumed office amid the Asian Financial Crisis and with agricultural problems due to poor weather conditions, thereby slowing the economic growth to -0.6% in 1998 from a 5.2% in 1997. The economy recovered by 3.4% in 1999 and 4% in 2000. The agricultural sector received greater priority, while the national government took steps to bring down the cost of medicine. His term was marked by a growth in foreign investments. He declared an "all-out-war" against the Moro Islamic Liberation Front (MILF), which led to the capture of the largest camp of the MILF.

In 2000, Estrada was accused of illegally accepting payoffs from various sources, including jueteng, a popular local numbers game, sparking a national controversy that led to the House of Representatives voting to impeach him. The Senate impeachment trial ended abruptly in mid-January 2001 after prosecutors staged a walk-out after the senators voted against the opening of a document that supposedly contained substantial evidence against Estrada. The decision drew protesters to EDSA, and the Armed Forces of the Philippines later withdrew their support. On January 20, 2001, Estrada resigned from office and fled Malacañang. Following the Supreme Court's decision upholding the legality of the Arroyo presidency, Estrada was arrested at his San Juan home on April 25, 2001, on the warrant of arrest issued by the Sandiganbayan for plunder charges.

== Election and inauguration ==
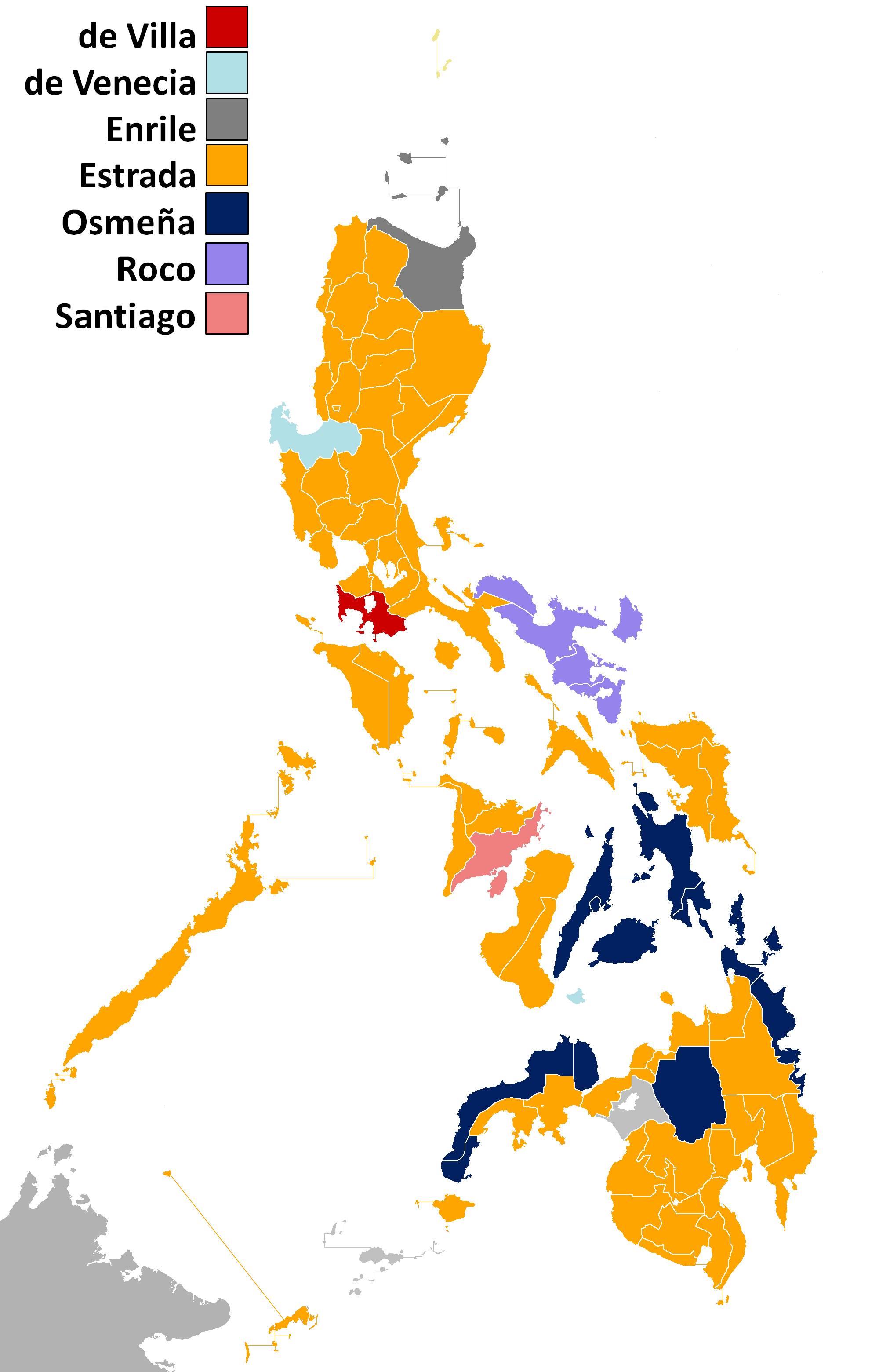
Results of the 1998 Philippine presidential election

Presidential and vice presidential elections were held in the Philippines on May 11, 1998. In the presidential election, Vice President Joseph Estrada won a six-year term as President by a landslide victory. In the vice-presidential race, Senator Gloria Macapagal Arroyo won a six-year term as Vice President, also by a landslide victory. This was the third election where both the president and vice president came from different parties.

Estrada was inaugurated on June 30, 1998, in the historical town of Malolos, Bulacan. Later that afternoon, Estrada delivered his inaugural address at the Quirino Grandstand in Luneta. In his inaugural address, Estrada said:

One hundred years after Kawit, fifty years after independence, twelve years after EDSA, and seven years after the rejection of foreign bases, it is now the turn of the masses to experience liberation. We stand in the shadow of those who fought to make us free- free from foreign domination, free from domestic tyranny, free from superpower dictation, free from economic backwardness.

== Major issues of presidency ==
=== Speeches ===
Estrada during his Third State of the Nation Address on July 24, 2000

- Inaugural Address, (June 30, 1998)
- First State of the Nation Address, (July 27, 1998)
- Second State of the Nation Address, (July 26, 1999)
- Third State of the Nation Address, (July 24, 2000)

=== Major acts and legislation ===
- Second RP-US Visiting Forces Agreement
- Philippine Clean Air Act of 1999 (Republic Act No. 8749) – designed to protect and preserve the environment and ensure the sustainable development of its natural resources
- Incentives for Regional Headquarters of Foreign Multinationals (Republic Act No. 8756) – The measure grants a host of incentives to multinational firms establishing their regional hubs in the country. It also provides a tax- and duty-free operating environment for them, and multiple entry visas to expatriates and their families, as well as a flat income tax rate of 15%.
- Retail Trade Liberalization Act (Republic Act No. 8762) – The bill dismantles 40 years of state protectionism over the country's retail trade industry and opens the sector to big foreign players.
- New General Banking Act (Republic Act No. 8791) – The measure opens up the local banking industry to foreign players after almost 50 years of having it exclusively reserved and protected for Filipino nationals.
- Electronic Commerce Act of 2000 (Republic Act No. 8792) – Outlaws computer hacking and provides opportunities for new businesses emerging from the Internet-driven New Economy
- New Securities Act (Republic Act No. 8799) – This law liberalizes the securities market by shifting policy from merit regulation to full disclosure. With its strengthened provisions against fraud, the measure is expected to pave the way for the full development of the Philippine equities and securities market.

== Administration and cabinet ==
=== Cabinet (1998–2001) ===
Office	Name	Term
President	H.E. Joseph Ejercito Estrada	June 30, 1998 – January 20, 2001
Vice-President	H.E. Gloria Macapagal Arroyo	June 30, 1998 – January 20, 2001
Executive Secretary	Ronaldo Zamora	July 1, 1998 – December 31, 2000
Executive Secretary	Edgardo Angara	January 6, 2001 – January 20, 2001
Secretary of Agrarian Reform	Horacio Morales, Jr.	July 1, 1998 – January 20, 2001
Secretary of Agriculture	William Dar	July 1, 1998 – May 24, 1999
Secretary of Agriculture	Edgardo Angara	May 25, 1999 – January 6, 2001
Secretary of Agriculture	Domingo F. Panganiban	January 8, 2001 – January 20, 2001
Secretary of Budget and Management	Benjamin Diokno	July 1, 1998 – January 20, 2001
Secretary of Education, Culture and Sports	Andrew Gonzalez	July 1, 1998 – January 20, 2001
Secretary of Energy	Mario Tiaoqui	July 1, 1998 – January 20, 2001
Secretary of Environment and Natural Resources	Antonio Cerilles	July 1, 1998 – January 20, 2001
Secretary of Finance	Edgardo Espiritu	July 1, 1998 – December 31, 1999
Secretary of Finance	Jose Pardo	January 2, 2000 – January 20, 2001
Secretary of Foreign Affairs	Domingo Siazon, Jr.	June 30, 1998 – January 20, 2001
Secretary of Health	Felipe Estrella, Jr.	June 30, 1998 – September 13, 1998
Secretary of Health	Alberto Romualdez, Jr.	September 14, 1998 – January 20, 2001
Secretary of the Interior and Local Government	Joseph Ejercito Estrada (in concurrent capacity as President)	July 1, 1998 – April 12, 1999
Secretary of the Interior and Local Government	Ronaldo Puno	April 12, 1999 – January 7, 2000
Secretary of the Interior and Local Government	Alfredo Lim	January 8, 2000 – January 19, 2001
Secretary of Justice	Serafin Cuevas	June 30, 1998 – February 11, 2000
Secretary of Justice	Artemio Tuquero	February 11, 2000 – January 20, 2001
Secretary of Labor and Employment	Bienvenido Laguesma	June 30, 1998 – January 20, 2001
Secretary of National Defense	Orlando S. Mercado	June 30, 1998 – January 20, 2001
Secretary of Public Works and Highways	Gregorio Vigilar	June 30, 1998 – January 20, 2001
Secretary of Science and Technology	William Padolina	June 30, 1998 – January 29, 1999
Secretary of Science and Technology	Filemino Uriarte	February 1, 1999 – January 1, 2001
Secretary of Science and Technology	Rogelio A. Panlasigui	January 2, 2001 – January 20, 2001
Secretary of Social Welfare and Development	Gloria Macapagal Arroyo	July 1, 1998 – October 3, 2000
Secretary of Social Welfare and Development	Dulce Sasuisag	October 4, 2000 – January 20, 2001
Secretary of Tourism	Gemma Cruz-Araneta	July 1, 1998 – January 19, 2001
Secretary of Trade and Industry	Jose Pardo	July 1, 1998 – 1999
Secretary of Trade and Industry	Manuel Roxas II	1999 – January 20, 2001
Secretary of Transportation and Communications	Vicente Rivera, Jr.	July 1, 1998 – January 20, 2001
Presidential Spokesperson	Sec. Fernardo Barican	June 30, 1998 – January 20, 2001
Press Secretary	Rodolfo Reyes	June 30, 1998 – April 12, 2000
Press Secretary	Ricardo Puno	April 13, 2000 – January 20, 2001
Malacañang Chief of Staff	Sec. Aprodicio Laquian	February 2000 – March 22, 2000
Head of the Presidential Management Staff	Leonora de Jesus	June 30, 1998 – 2000
Head of the Presidential Management Staff	Macel Fernandez	2000 – January 20, 2001
Chairperson of the Commission on Higher Education	Angel Alcala	June 30, 1998 – July 11, 1999
Chairperson of the Commission on Higher Education	Ester Garcia	July 12, 1999 – January 20, 2001
Director-General of the National Economic and Development Authority	Felipe Medalla	July 1, 1998 – January 20, 2001
Solicitor General	Ricardo Galvez	June 30, 1998 – January 20, 2001
Chairman of the Metropolitan Manila Development Authority	Jejomar Binay	July 1, 1998 – January 20, 2001
National Security Adviser	Alexander Aguirre	July 1, 1998 – January 19, 2001
Presidential Adviser on the Peace Process	Manuel Yan	June 30, 1998 – January 20, 2001
Lead Convenor of the National Anti-Poverty Commission	Horacio Morales, Jr.	December 1998 – October 2000
Lead Convenor of the National Anti-Poverty Commission	Dulce Saguisag	October 2000 – January 20, 2001
Chief of the Philippine National Police	Police Dep. Dir. Gen. Roberto Lastimoso (Note: Due to Santiago Aliño's unresolved retirement status, all of the succeeding PNP Chiefs (non-OIC) will only have rank of Police Deputy Director General (3-star rank).)	1998 – 1999
Chief of the Philippine National Police	Police Dep. Dir. Gen. Edmundo Larroza (OIC)	1999 – November 1999
Chief of the Philippine National Police	Police Dir. Gen. Panfilo Lacson (Note: Due to Santiago Aliño's unresolved retirement status, all of the succeeding PNP Chiefs (non-OIC) will only have rank of Police Deputy Director General (3-star rank). Panfilo Lacson has the rank of Police Deputy Director General until 2000.)	November 1999 – January 20, 2001
Chief of Staff of the Armed Forces of the Philippines	Gen. Joselino Nazareno	1998 – 2000
Chief of Staff of the Armed Forces of the Philippines	Gen. Angelo Reyes	2000 – January 20, 2001

=== Other cabinet-level and high posts ===
Cabinet level

- Executive Secretary
  - Ronaldo Zamora (1998–2000)
  - Edgardo Angara (2000–2001)
- Press Secretary
  - Rodolfo Reyes (1998–1999)
  - Ricardo Puno (1999–2001)
- Presidential Spokesman
  - Fernando Barican (1998–2001)
- Presidential Chief of Staff
  - Aprodicio Lacquian (1999–2000)
- Head of the Presidential Management Staff
  - Leonora de Jesus (1998–2000)
  - Macel Fernandez (2000–2001)
- Metropolitan Manila Development Authority Chairman
  - Jejomar Binay (1998–2001)

Others

- Flagship Programs
  - Robert Aventajado (1998–2001)
- Director General, Philippine National Police
  - Gen. Roberto Lastimoso (1998–1999)
  - Gen. Edmundo L. Larroza, Officer-in-Charge (1999)
  - Gen. Panfilo Lacson (1999–2001)

== Supreme Court appointments ==
Estrada nominated the following to the Supreme Court of the Philippines:

1. Justice Bernardo P. Pardo – September 30, 1998
2. Hilario Davide, Jr. – Chief Justice November 30, 1998 (an associate justice since 1991)
3. Justice Arturo B. Buena – January 5, 1999
4. Justice Minerva P. Gonzaga-Reyes – January 5, 1999
5. Justice Consuelo Ynares-Santiago – April 6, 1999
6. Justice Sabino R. De Leon, Jr. – October 12, 1999
7. Justice Angelina Sandoval-Gutierrez – December 22, 2000 (his last SC justice appointee)

== Pardons ==
Estrada granted pardon to the following:

- Rodolfo Dominguez Quizon, Jr. (September 28, 1998) – convicted of arson

== Domestic policies ==
=== Economy ===
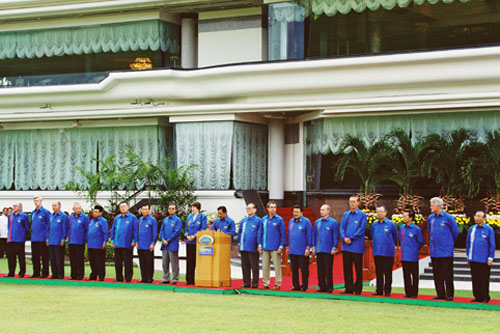
Estrada (7th from right) during the APEC summit in 2000.

Even with its strong economic team, the Estrada administration failed to capitalize on the gains of the previous administration. Estrada's administration was severely criticized for cronyism, incompetence, and corruption, causing it to lose the confidence of foreign investors. Foreign investors' confidence was further damaged when, in his second year, Estrada was accused of exerting influence in an investigation of a friend's involvement in stock market manipulation. Social unrest brought about by numerous bombing threats, actual bombings, kidnappings, and other criminal activities contributed to the economy's troubles. Economic performance was also hurt by climatic disturbance that caused extremes of dry and wet weather.

Toward the end of Estrada's administration, the fiscal deficit had doubled to more than ₱100 billion from a low of ₱49 billion in 1998. Despite such setbacks, the rate of GNP in 1999 increased to 3.6 percent from 0.1 percent in 1998, and the GDP posted a 3.2 percent growth rate, up from a low of −0.5 percent in 1998. Debt reached ₱2.1 trillion in 1999. Domestic debt amounted to ₱986.7 billion while foreign debt stood at US$52.2 billion.

Unemployment increased from 10.3% in 1998 to 11.2% in 2000. Endo contractualization and labor export became more prevalent while the minimum wage remained stagnant. Labor strikes during Estrada's presidency were dispersed violently.

=== Masa format on radio ===
During his term, Estrada ordered to the National Telecommunications Commission to adopt a Filipino language-based radio format known as masa. Named for his icon Masa (or Masses), all radio stations adopted the masa format since 1998, as DJ's wanted to replace English language-based stations immediately to air OPM songs and requests. After his term in 2001, several FM stations continued to adopt the masa format nationwide.

=== Saguisag Commission ===
To investigate the alleged anomalies of the Ramos administration, Estrada created the "Saguisag Commission" headed by former Senator Rene Saguisag. Ramos, however, refused to appear before the commission, for he argued that the jurisdiction lies in the court.

In the so-called Centennial Expo scam, Mr. Ramos claimed the Senate committee that conducted the probe "never closed the case" because it did not issue any final report. Instead, he rued, Estrada created an administrative fact-finding commission headed by former Senator Rene Saguisag. But six former government officials during his administration who were implicated in the Centennial Expo scam were subsequently "exonerated" by the Ombudsman in October 1998. Former Vice President Salvador Laurel, who chaired the Centennial Expo and was among the principal accused in this case, however, died before he could be exonerated, Mr. Ramos rued.

In the Smokey Mountain case, he said, he appeared in 2000 before the public hearing of the House committee on good government chaired by then Rep. Ed Lara whose panel cleared the project as valid and legal. Subsequently, he said, the Supreme Court ruled 13–0, with 2 abstentions, in favor of the project. The SC also upheld the legality and constitutionality of the project and dismissed the petition filed against it by Sen. Miriam Defensor Santiago.

In the questioned Masinloc power project, he said, the Joint Congressional Oversight Committee looked into the privilege speech of then Sen. Aquilino Pimentel, Jr. on Ramos' alleged influence that this power plant be sold to a consortium connected with Malaysian Prime Minister Mahathir Mohamad.

=== Agrarian reform ===
The Estrada administration widened the coverage of the Comprehensive Agrarian Reform Program (CARP) to the landless peasants in the country side, distributing more than 266,000 hectares (660,000 acres) of land to 175,000 landless farmers, including land owned by the traditional rural elite. (Total of 523,000 hectares to 305,000 farmers during his 2nd year as president). In September 1999, he issued Executive Order 151, also known as Farmer's Trust Fund, which allows the voluntary consolidation of small farm operation into medium and large scale integrated enterprise that can access long-term capital. Estrada launched the Magkabalikat Para sa Kaunlarang Agraryo or MAGKASAKA. The Department of Agrarian Reform forged into joint ventures with private investors into agrarian sector to make FBs competitive.

In 1999, a huge fund was allocated to agricultural programs; one of these is the Agrikulturang Maka Masa, through which it achieved an output growth of 6 percent, a record high at the time, thereby lowering the inflation rate from 11 percent in January 1999 to just a little over 3 percent by November of the same year.

=== Anti-crime Task Forces ===
In 1998, by virtue of Executive Order No. 8, Estrada created the Presidential Anti-Organized Crime Task Force (PAOCTF) to minimize, if not totally eradicate, car theft and worsening kidnapping cases in the country. With the help of this task force, the Philippine National Police achieved a record-high trust rating of +53 percent. Estrada also created the Philippine Center on Transnational Crime (PCTC) in 1999, with the objective of formulating and implementing a concerted of action of all law enforcement, intelligence and other government agencies for the prevention and control of transnational crime.

In November 2000, during the Juetenggate scandal of Estrada, high officials of the PAOCTF–Cezar Mancao, Michael Ray Aquino, Glen Dumlao, and PAOCTF chief Panfilo Lacson—were implicated in the murder of publicist Salvador Dacer and his driver Emmanuel Corbito in Cavite. Dacer at that time was accused to be behind a black propaganda against Estrada–a charge Dacer denied.

=== Death penalty ===
The death penalty law in the Philippines was reinforced during the incumbency of Estrada's predecessor, Fidel Ramos. This law provided the use of the electric chair until the gas chamber (method chosen by government to replace electrocution) could be installed. However, the electric chair was destroyed some time prior due to a typhoon, leaving only a blackened scorch mark. Some sources have said it had burnt out the last time it had been used.

The first execution by lethal injection took place under Estrada's administration. On February 5, 1999, Leo Echegaray, a house painter, was executed for repeatedly raping his stepdaughter. He was the first convict to be executed since the re-imposition of death penalty in 1993. His execution induced once again a heated debate between the anti and the pro-death penalty forces in the Philippines with a huge majority of people calling for the execution of Echegaray.

The Estrada administration supported death penalty as the antidote to crime. The opposition maintained that the death penalty is not a deterrent and that there have been studies already debunking the deterrence theory. Legislators and politicians refused to heed the recommendation of the Supreme Court for Congress to review the death penalty riding on the popularity of the pro-death penalty sentiment.

Six years after its re imposition, more than 1,200 individuals have been sentenced to death and seven convicts have been executed through lethal injection.

From 1994 to 1995 the number of persons on death row increased from 12 to 104. From 1995 to 1996 it increased to 182. In 1997 the total death convicts was at 520 and in 1998 the inmates in death row was at 781. As of November 1999 there are a total of 956 death convicts at the National Bilibid Prisons and at the Correctional Institute for Women.

As of December 31, 1999, based on the statistics compiled by the Episcopal Commission on Prisoner Welfare of the Catholic Bishops Conference of the Philippines, there were a total of 936 convicts interned at the National Bilibid Prisons and another 23 detained at the Correctional Institute for Women. Of these figures, six are minors and 12 are foreigners.

On January 4, 2000, Estrada rejected a last-minute appeal from convicted rapist Alex Bartolome, who became the last person to be executed in the country. Estrada called a moratorium in 2000 to honor the bimillennial anniversary of Jesus' birth.

=== Sovereign guarantees ===
Estrada immediately ordered the removal of all sovereign guarantees on contracts for public projects which would require the sovereign Filipino people to assume the financial losses of private companies doing business with the government. Records showed that until January 20, 2001, Estrada did not sign a single government contract with a sovereign guarantee.

=== Charter change ===
Under Estrada, there was an attempt to change the 1987 constitution, through a process termed as CONCORD, or Constitutional Correction for Development. Unlike Charter change under presidents Ramos and Arroyo, the CONCORD proposal, according to its proponents, would only amend the 'restrictive' economic provisions of the constitution that is considered as impeding the entry of more foreign investments in the Philippines.

There were objections from opposition politicians, religious sects and left wing organizations based on diverse arguments such as national patrimony and the proposed constitutional changes would be self-serving. Like his predecessor, Estrada's government was accused of pushing Charter change for their own vested interests.

=== War against the MILF ===
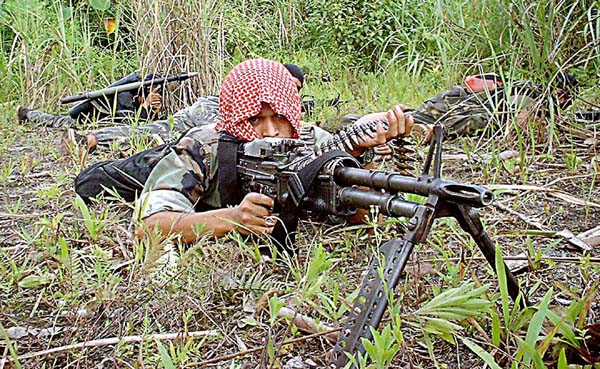
An MILF soldier trains with an M60 machine gun.

During the Ramos administration a cessation of hostilities agreement was signed between the Philippine Government and the Moro Islamic Liberation Front (MILF) in July 1997. This was continued by a series of peace talks and negotiations in Estrada administration. However the Moro Islamic Liberation Front (MILF), an Islamic group formed in 1977, seeks to be an independent Islamic State from the Philippines, and despite the agreements, a sequence of terrorist attacks against the military and civilians still continued. Such of those attack are 277 violations committed, kidnapping a foreign priest, namely Father Luciano Benedetti, the occupying and setting on fire of the municipal hall of Talayan, Maguindanao; the takeover of the Kauswagan Municipal Hall; the bombing of the Lady of Mediatrix boat at Ozamiz City; and the takeover of the Narciso Ramos Highway. The Philippine government also learned that the MILF has links with Al-Qaeda. Because of this, on March 21, 2000, Estrada declared an "all-out-war" against the MILF. During the war the Catholic Bishops' Conference of the Philippines (CBCP) asked Estrada to have a cease-fire with MILF, but Estrada opposed the idea arguing that a cease-fire would cause more terrorist attacks. For the next three months of the war, Camp Abubakar, headquarters of the MILF, fell along with other 13 major camps and 43 minor camps, and then all of which became under controlled by the government. The MILF leader Salamat Hashim fled the country and went to Malaysia. The MILF later declared a Jihad on the government. On July 10 of the same year, the President went to Mindanao and raised the Philippine flag symbolizing victory. After the war the President said, "... will speed up government efforts to bring genuine and lasting peace and development in Mindanao". In the middle of July the president ordered the military to arrest top MILF leaders.

High on the list of priorities was the plight of MILF guerrillas who were tired of fighting and had no camps left to report to. On October 5, 2000, the first massive surrender of 669 MILF mujahideen led by the renegade vice mayor of Marugong, Lanao del Sur Malupandi Cosandi Sarip and seven other battalion commanders, surrendered to Estrada at the 4th ID headquarters in Camp Edilberto Evangelista in Cagayan de Oro. They were followed shortly by a second batch of 855 surrenderees led by MILF Commander Sayben Ampaso on December 29, 2000.

The war with the MILF was severely criticized by foreign and media observers. Agriculture Secretary Edgardo Angara bridled at the high cost of Mindanao specifically the diversion of resources from military operations that eat away from the agriculture modernization program. Angara was quoted as saying "What General Reyes asks, he gets". Moreover, the fighting in Mindanao destroyed more than P135 million worth of crops and 12,000 hectares of rice and corn fields.

== Foreign policies ==
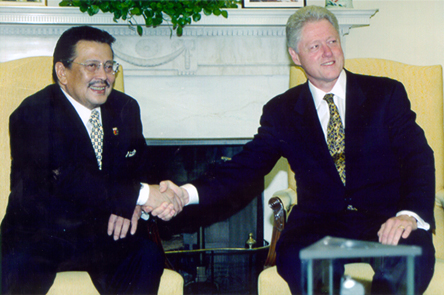
Estrada with U.S. President Bill Clinton at the Oval Office

The Estrada administration upheld the foreign policy thrusts of the Ramos administration, focusing on national security, economic diplomacy, assistance to nationals, and image-building. The Philippines continued to be at the forefront of the regional and multilateral arena; it successfully hosted the ASEAN Ministerial Meeting in July 1998 and undertook confidence-building measures with China over South China Sea issue through a meeting in March 1999. Estrada strengthened bilateral ties with neighboring countries with visits to Vietnam, Thailand, Malaysia, Singapore, Hong Kong, Japan, and South Korea.

The country also sent a delegation of 108 observers to the Indonesian parliamentary elections, and engaged in cooperative activities in the areas of security, defense, combating transnational crimes, economy, culture, and the protection of OFWs and Filipinos abroad.

=== RP-US Visiting Forces Agreement ===
In 1999, a Visiting Forces Agreement (VFA) with the United States was ratified in the Senate. The first VFA was signed under President Ramos in 1998, and the second was subsequently signed under Estrada; the two agreements came to effect a year later. The primary effect of the Agreement is to require the U.S. government to: notify Philippine authorities when it becomes aware of the apprehension, arrest or detention of any Philippine personnel visiting the U.S.; and when so requested by the Philippine government, to ask the appropriate authorities to waive jurisdiction in favor of the Philippines, except cases of special interest to the U.S. departments of State or Defense.^{[VIII 1]}

The Agreement contains various procedural safeguards which amongst other things establish the right to due process and proscribe double jeopardy^{[VIII 2–6]}. The agreement also, among other provisions, exempts RP personnel from visa formalities and guarantees expedited entry and exit processing^{[IV]}; requires the U.S. to accept RP driving licenses^{[V]}; allows RP personnel to carry arms at U.S. military installations while on duty^{[VI]}; provides personal tax exemptions and import/export duty exclusions for RP personnel^{[X, XI]}; requires the U.S. to provide health care to RP personnel^{[XIV]}; and exempts RP vehicles, vessels, and aircraft from landing or ports fees, navigation or overflight charges, road tolls or any other charges for the use of U.S. military installations^{[XV]}.

=== Third informal ASEAN summit ===
Estrada hosted the third Informal ASEAN summit at the Philippine International Convention Center (PICC) from November 24–28, 1999. He met with the leaders of the nine ASEAN member-countries and three dialogue partners of the regional grouping, namely China, Japan and the Republic of Korea. The leaders of the 10-member ASEAN and their three dialogue partners vowed to further broaden East Asia cooperation in the 21st century to improve the quality of life of peoples in the region; they also agreed to strengthen cooperation in addressing common concerns in the area of transnational issues in the region.

== Controversies ==
=== 1998 ===
==== Subic Bay leadership dispute ====
After winning the 1998 presidential elections on May of that year, newly elected president Estrada issued Administrative Order No. 1, which ordered the removal of Dick Gordon as chairman of the Subic Bay Metropolitan Authority (SBMA). Estrada appointed Felicito Payumo, Gordon's critic and congressman of Bataan as new chairman. Gordon refused to step down, stating that his re-appointment from the Ramos administration gave him civil service protection. The removal process was not easy; hundreds of volunteers and paid people barricated the gates of SBMA and Gordon locked himself inside the SBMA Administrative Office Building 229. After this, Gordon was dubbed a dictator because he rebelled against an executive order. The issue sparked the interest local and foreign press known as the Showdown at Subic.

Gordon filed for a temporary restraining order before the local court. The local court of Olongapo granted Gordon's request but Payumo's party filed an appeal before the Court of Appeals (CA). The CA reversed the local court's ruling and it was affirmed by the Supreme Court. With the Supreme Court decision, Gordon called Payumo and turned over the reins of SBMA at the Subic Bay Yacht Club two months later on September 3, 1998. Together with the Subic volunteers, they cleaned up the facility.

==== Textbook scam intervention ====
In 1998, Estrada allegedly appointed a cousin, Cecilia de Castro, as presidential assistant. The President denied knowing her in the wake of the textbook scam in 1998. The President later intervened in the investigation of the said scam.

=== 1999 ===
==== The Philippine Daily Inquirer ads pullout ====
Estrada criticized the Philippine Daily Inquirer, the nation's most popular broadsheet newspaper, for "bias, malice and fabrication" against him. In 1999, several government organizations, pro-Estrada businesses, and movie producers simultaneously pulled their advertisements in the Inquirer. The presidential palace was widely implicated in the advertising boycott, prompting sharp criticism from international press freedom watchdogs.

==== The Manila Times controversy ====
Estrada launched a libel suit against the country's oldest newspaper the Manila Times over a story that alleged corruption in the awarding of a public works project. After a personal apology from an owner was published, the libel suit was dropped. Within three months the Manila Times was sold to a "housing magnate with no previous newspaper experience".

==== BW Resources scandal ====
BW Resources, a small gaming company listed on the Philippine Stock Exchange (PSE) and linked to people close to Estrada, experienced "a meteoric rise" in its stock price due to suspected stock price manipulation. The ensuing investigation led only to further confusion when the head of the compliance and surveillance group of the PSE and his entire staff resigned saying "I believe I can no longer effectively do my job." The events created a negative impression. "The BW controversy undermined foreign investor confidence in the stock market" and "also contributed to a major loss of confidence in the Philippines among foreign and local investors on concerns that cronyism may have played a part."

==== PCSO funding controversy ====
The Philippine Center for Investigative Journalism has reported that there are 66 corporate records wherein Estrada, his wife, mistresses and children are listed as incorporators or board members. Thirty-one of these companies were set up during Estrada's vice-presidential tenure and one when he assumed the presidency. Based on the 1998 and 1999 financial statements, 14 of the 66 companies have assets of over ₱600 million.

On October 15, 1998, First Lady Loi Ejercito, registered with the Securities and Exchange Commission her private foundation—the Partnership for the Poor Foundation, Inc.—which provides relief and livelihood to the poor. A few months after its incorporation, the foundation received ₱100 million from the Philippine Charity Sweepstakes Office (PCSO) as donation. The donation far exceeded the PCSO's combined donation of ₱65 million to regular beneficiaries like orphanages and hospitals. The complainants consider this a conflict-of-interest. The donation of government funds to the private foundation of the First Lady was also found to have been delivered to their legal residence in San Juan, Metro Manila.

==== Midnight Cabinet ====
Estrada was reported by his Chief of Staff Aprodicio Laquian to have allegedly spent long hours drinking with shady characters as well as "midnight drinking sessions" with some of his cabinet members during meetings. Members of the so-called midnight cabinet included Ilocos Sur Governor Chavit Singson, Caloocan Representative Luis 'Baby' Asistio, and BW Resources Corp. head Dante Tan.

==== Estrada mistresses ====
During the juetenggate scandal, Estrada's critics claimed that Estrada's mistresses received financial benefits from the President.

==== Hot cars scandal ====
Valenzuela Representative Magtanggol Gunigundo II exposed the assignment of Estrada of some seized luxury vehicles and SUVs to his Cabinet secretaries and favored political allies through an obscure office "Presidential Retrieval Task Force." Estrada initially resisted his critics' calls to return the "hot cars" to the Bureau of Customs, and challenged them to file a case against him. But, by November, he withdrew his earlier decision and instructed the Customs to dispose the vehicles through an auction.

=== 2000 ===
==== Juetenggate scandal ====
Chavit Singson in October 2000 alleged he gave Estrada ₱400 million as payoff from illegal gambling profits. On October 16, 2000, he accused Estrada, as the "lord of all jueteng lords" for receiving 5 million pesos protection money from jueteng every month during his term of presidency.

==== Dacer–Corbito double murder case ====
Salvador "Bubby" Dacer, publicist in the Philippines, and his driver, Emmanuel Corbito, were abducted in Makati, the business district of Manila. They were later killed, and their vehicle dumped. In 2001, a number of arrests were made.

The ultimate reasons for Dacer's murder remain a subject of debate. Fidel Ramos has publicly accused his successor, Estrada, of giving the original order—Estrada was mired in a corruption scandal at the time, and according to some reports, Estrada believed Dacer was helping Ramos destabilize his rule.

=== 2001 ===
==== Second envelope suppression ====
On January 17, 2001, the impeachment trial of Estrada moved to the investigation of an envelope containing evidence that would allegedly prove acts of political corruption by Estrada; senators allied with Estrada moved to block the evidence. The conflict between the senator-judges, and the prosecution became deeper, but then Senate Majority Floor Leader Francisco Tatad requested to the Impeachment court to make a vote for opening the second envelope. The vote resulted in 10 senators in favor of examining the evidence, and 11 senators in favor of suppressing it. After the vote, Senator Aquilino Pimentel, Jr. resigned as Senate President and walked out of the impeachment proceedings together with the 9 opposition Senators and 11 prosecutors in the Estrada impeachment trial. The 11 administration senators who voted YES to block the opening of the second envelope remained in Senate Session Hall together with the members of the defense. They were chanted with "JOE'S COHORTS" where their surnames were arranged.

== Impeachment trial ==
Presidency of Joseph Estrada
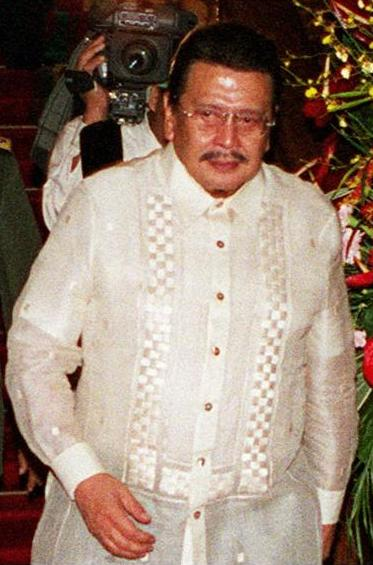
- President Estrada in 2000.
- Accused: Joseph Estrada, 13th President of the Philippines
- Proponents: House Minority Leader Feliciano Belmonte Jr.
- Date: November 13, 2000 – January 20, 2001 (2 months and 1 week)
- Outcome: Impeachment trial aborted.; Declared as resigned by the Supreme Court and left office on January 20, 2001.
- Charges: Graft and corrupt practices; Betrayal of public trust; Culpable violation of the constitution

Impeachment vote by the House of Representatives (November 13, 2000)
- Votes in favor: 115 / 257 (45%)
- Not voting: 142 / 257 (55%)
- Result: Impeachment successful

=== Corruption charges ===
The Estrada presidency was soon hounded by charges of plunder and corruption. Estrada was reported by his Chief of Staff Aprodicio Laquian to have allegedly spent long hours drinking with shady characters as well as "midnight drinking sessions" with some of his cabinet members during meetings. In October 2000, an acknowledged gambling racketeer, Luis "Chavit" Singson, governor of the province of Ilocos Sur, alleged that he had personally given Estrada the sum of 400 million pesos ($8,255,933) as payoff from illegal gambling profits, as well as 180 million pesos ($3,715,170) from the government price subsidy for the tobacco farmers' marketing cooperative.

=== Officers of the trial ===
==== House prosecution panel ====
House prosecutors
Chief prosecutor Sonny Belmonte (Lakas, Quezon City)	Joker Arroyo (Independent, Makati)	Sergio Apostol (Lakas, Leyte)	Bobby Tañada (Liberal, Quezon City)
Oscar Moreno (Lakas, Misamis Oriental)	Raul Gonzalez (Nacionalista, Iloilo City)	Oscar Rodriguez (LAMP, Pampanga)	Salacnib Baterina (LAMP, Ilocos Sur)
Roan Libarios (LAMP, Agusan del Norte)	Clavel Martinez (Lakas, Cebu)	Antonio Nachura (Liberal, Samar)	

==== Defense counsel ====
===== Private defense =====
- Raymond Fortun
- Sigmund Fortun
- Retired Chief Justice Andres Narvasa
- Ex‑Justice Secretary Serafin Cuevas
- Former Manila Chief Prosecutor Jose Flaminiano

===== Court-appointed defense =====
- Prospero Crescini
- Former Judge Irene Jurado
- Ex‑Justice Manuel Pamaran
- Noel Malaya

=== Impeachment proceedings ===
On November 13, 2000, 115 members of the House of Representatives signed an impeachment complaint against Estrada on charges of graft and corruption, betrayal of public trust, and culpable violation of the Constitution. The impeachment complaint attained at least 85 signatures, or one third of the House of Representatives as required in the Constitution. With the signature threshold reached, the impeachment complaint constitutes as the formal Articles of Impeachment against Estrada and was transmitted to the Senate without a plenary vote. The articles of impeachment were then transmitted to the Senate and an impeachment court was formed, with Chief Justice Hilario Davide, Jr. as presiding officer.

Major television networks pre-empted their afternoon schedules to bring full coverage of the Impeachment Trial.

During the trial, the prosecution presented witnesses and evidence to the impeachment court regarding Estrada's involvement in an illegal numbers game, also known as jueteng, and his maintenance of secret bank accounts. Estrada's legal team denied such allegations including his ownership of an account under the name "Jose Velarde". In February 2001, at the initiative of Senate President Aquilino Pimentel, Jr., the second envelope was opened before the local and foreign media, and it contained a document stating that Jaime Dichavez and not Estrada owned the "Jose Velarde Account".

Ilocos Sur Governor Luis "Chavit" Singson was one of the witnesses who testified against Estrada. Estrada and the Singson were said to be "partners" in-charge of the operations of illegal gambling in the country. Singson feared that he would be charged and stripped of power (there have been talks about the governor making a deal with the opposition... he was to help incriminate Estrada and he would be compensated for his service), but he was offered immunity by anti-Estrada lawmakers. He was then asked to accuse Estrada of having committed several illegal acts. Vice-President of then Equitable-PCI Bank Clarissa Ocampo testified that she saw Estrada sign the false name "Jose Velarde" on the banking document and this was also witnessed by Apodicio Laquian.

According to a 2004 Transparency International report, Estrada was ranked the world's tenth most corrupt head of government, and being the second Philippine Head of State after Marcos in terms of corruption.

== EDSA II ==
=== Protests ===
On the evening of January 16, 2001, the impeachment court, whose majority were political allies of Estrada, voted not to open an envelope that was said to contain incriminating evidence against the president. The final vote was 11–10, in favor of keeping the envelope closed. The prosecution panel (of congressmen and lawyers) walked out of the Impeachment Court in protest of this vote. Others noted that the walkout merited a contempt of court which Chief Justice Hilario Davide Jr., intentionally or unintentionally, did not enforce. The afternoon schedule of television networks covering the Impeachment were pre-empted by the prolongation of the day's court session due to the issue of this envelope. The evening telenovelas of networks were pushed back for up to two hours. That night, anti-Estrada protesters gathered in front of the EDSA Shrine at Epifanio de los Santos Avenue, not too far away from the site of the 1986 People Power Revolution that overthrew Ferdinand Marcos. A political turmoil ensued and the clamor for Estrada's resignation became stronger than ever. In the following days, the number of protesters grew to the hundreds of thousands.

On January 19, 2001, the Armed Forces of the Philippines, seeing the political upheaval throughout the country, decided to withdraw its support from the president and transfer its allegiance to the vice president, Gloria Macapagal Arroyo. The following day, the Supreme Court declared that the seat of presidency was vacant.

=== Resignation ===
At noon, the Supreme Court declared that Estrada "constructively resigned" his post and Chief Justice Davide swore in the constitutional successor, Gloria Macapagal Arroyo, as President of the Philippines. Prior to Estrada's departure from Malacañang, he issued a press release which included:

...I now leave Malacañang Palace, the seat of the presidency of this country, for the sake of peace and in order to begin the healing process of our nation. I leave the Palace of our people with gratitude for the opportunities given to me for service to our people...

On January 18, 2008, Joseph Estrada's Pwersa ng Masang Pilipino (PMP) placed a full-page advertisement in Metro Manila newspapers, blaming EDSA 2 of having "inflicted a dent on Philippine democracy". Its featured clippings questioned the constitutionality of the revolution. The published featured clippings were taken from Time, New York Times, The Straits Times, Los Angeles Times, Washington Post, Asia Times Online, The Economist, and the International Herald Tribune. Former Supreme Court justice and Estrada appointee as chairwoman of the Philippine Charity Sweepstakes Office Cecilia Muñoz-Palma opined that EDSA 2 violated the 1987 Constitution.
