= Michael Aquino =

Michael Aquino may refer to:

- Michael A. Aquino (1946–2019), former US military officer and founder of the Temple of Set
- Michael Ray Aquino, former Filipino intelligence officer
