= Dacer–Corbito double murder case =

Filipino murder victim

Dacer–Corbito murders
- Dacer (left) and Corbito
- Location: Kidnapping: Near Makati–Manila boundary, Metro Manila, Philippines; Murders: Indang, Cavite, Philippines
- Date: November 24, 2000; 25 years ago
- Attack type: Kidnapping, murder
- Deaths: Salvador "Bubby" Dacer; Emmanuel Corbito
- Perpetrator: Members of the Presidential Anti-Organized Crime Task Force
- Accused: PAOCTF officers including: P/Supt. Michael Ray Aquino (chief of operations; case against him dismissed); P/Sr. Supt. Teofilo Viña (chief of PAOCTF–Visayas; deceased); P/Supt. Glenn Dumlao (deputy chief for operations of PAOCTF–Luzon; name was dropped from the list); P/Supt. Cezar Mancao II (acquitted); P/C. Insp. Vicente Arnado
- Convictions: Life imprisonment (Torres)
- Convicted: SPO3 Mauro Torres (in 2017)

The Dacer–Corbito double murder case is one of the unsolved murders that occurred in the Philippines during the administration of Joseph Estrada.

In 2000, Salvador "Bubby" Dacer and his driver, Emmanuel Corbito, were abducted in Metro Manila, later killed, and their vehicle dumped. Since 2001, a number of arrests were made.

== Background ==
The ultimate reasons for Dacer's murder remain a subject of debate. Former President Fidel V. Ramos has publicly accused his successor, President Joseph Estrada, of giving the original order — Estrada was mired in a corruption scandal at the time, and according to some reports, Estrada believed Dacer was helping Ramos destabilize his rule.

== Victims ==
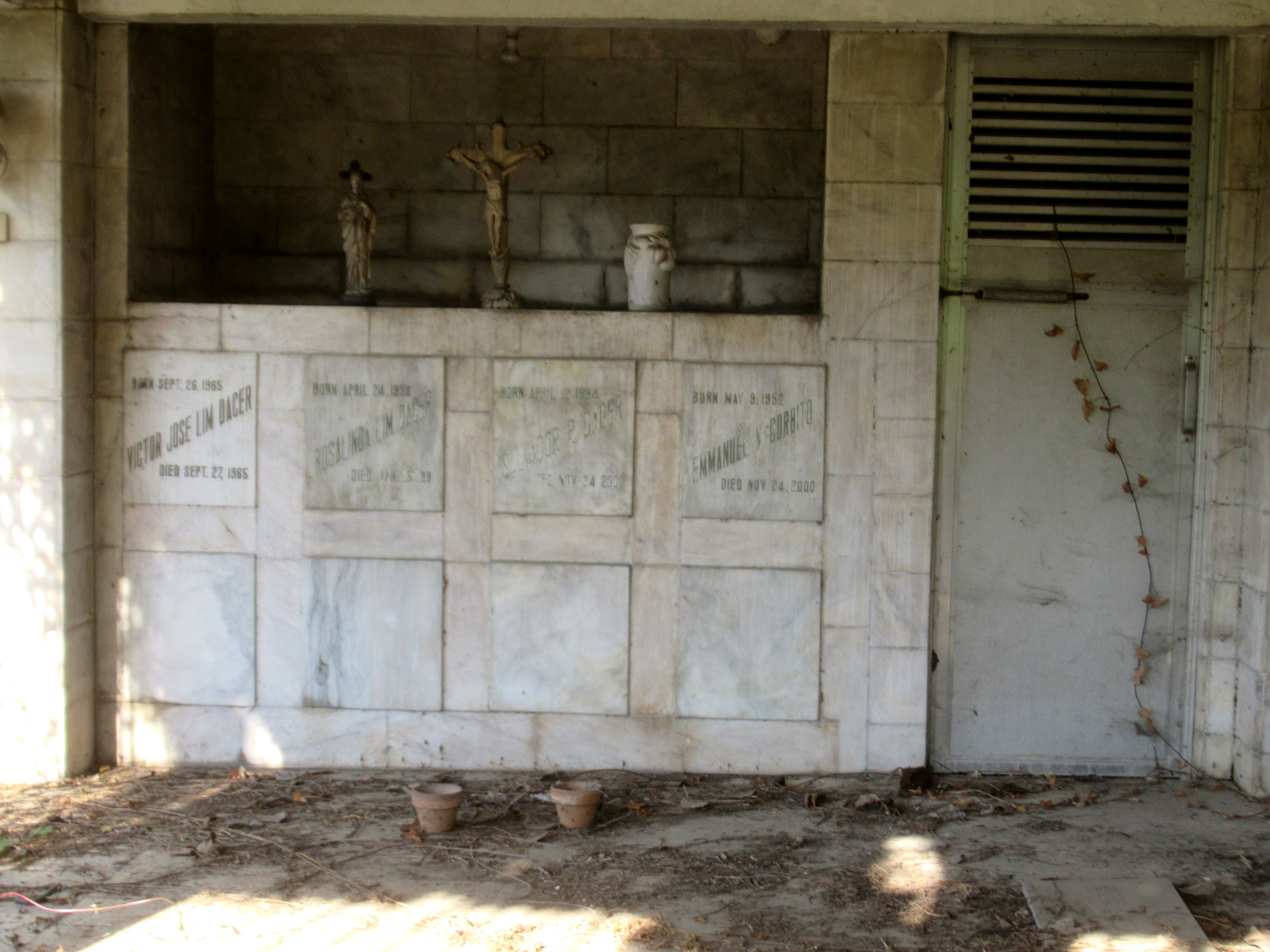
Grave of Dacer (2nd from right) and Corbito (right) at the Himlayang Pilipino Memorial Park, Quezon City

Salvador "Bubby" Dacer (April 12, 1934 – November 24, 2000) was a publicist from Albay. His clients included many of the top figures in the country's politics, notably Presidents Fidel V. Ramos and Joseph Estrada (incumbent at the time of the crime), as well as in the police. He is the uncle of broadcast journalist Kaye Dacer.

Emmanuel Corbito (May 9, 1952 – November 24, 2000), meanwhile, was Dacer's driver.

Prior to their deaths, Dacer was summoned in Malacañang by Estrada as he was accused of being behind the impeachment of the latter.

== Events ==
=== Kidnapping and murder ===
On November 24, 2000, Dacer and Corbito, while on their way to the former's office at the Manila Hotel, were abducted at the intersection of South Superhighway and Zobel Roxas Street at the city boundary of Makati and Manila. Later in the night, they were reportedly killed by strangulation and their bodies were burned. Three days later, Dacer's car was found abandoned in Maragondon, Cavite. Their charred remains, found in 2001 in Indang, in the same province, were positively identified. (Note: Citations generally concerning the kidnapping and murder:)

=== Testimonies ===
Members of the Presidential Anti-Organized Crime Task Force (PAOCTF) were the suspects as claimed by Jimmy Lopez, a PAOCTF civilian agent and former barangay captain, and Alex Diloy, in a press conference on March 29, 2001. A day prior, the two, both farmers in Indang, had been captured in a raid by National Bureau of Investigation agents, whom later led by them to a creek where they found the remains.

The PAOCTF at the time of the crime was directly under then Philippine National Police chief and then candidate (later elected senator) Panfilo Lacson, who denied his involvement in any illegal abduction.

The two admitted their participation in the crime and identified twelve other co-conspirators including four PAOCTF members, particularly, SPO4 Marino Soberano (according to the NBI, was present in the raid near Dacer's house and the crime) and SPO3 Mauro Torres.

Lopez recounted that a group led by Soberano arrived, with the victims, at his home on the afternoon after the abduction. He brought them to the garage of his brother, William. At evening, the group left as he stayed behind.

Diloy, narrating the disposal of the corpses in the nearby creek, admitted preparing a pyre. He witnessed William, Torres, and Digo de Pedro, identified as an incumbent councilor in Indang, strangle the victims to death; their bodies were set afire, burning for about half an hour. Thereafter, he left the group as he walked toward Binakayan. He revealed receiving cash twice after the killings.

P/Sr. Supt. Teofilo Viña, PAOCTF–Visayas chief and Lacson's former aide, was first alleged by the NBI as the mastermind; also pointed by the two farmers as the team leader of the involved PAOCTF agents who might gave final order for the execution of the victims. An airline passenger manifest had reportedly showed that Viña left Cebu for Manila, staying from a day prior to the abduction until the following night. On the other hand, P/Supt. Glenn Dumlao, deputy chief for operations of PAOCTF–Luzon, was also alleged as the one who ordered the execution. Meanwhile, Soberano and Torres later testified that the abduction was ordered by P/C. Insp. Vicente Arnado; this was supported by SPO1 Ruperto Nemeno of PAOCTF–Luzon, who confessed to his role in the abduction.

=== Later developments on the case ===
A testimony of a former ranking official of the PAOCTF led to the capture of seven agents allegedly linked to the case.

In late March of 2001, the NBI charged at least twelve men of double murder, including Lopez brothers, Diloy, de Pedro, and four police officers, before the Department of Justice. The twelve, already either in detention or in police custody, were among the 22 PAOCTF officers and civilian agents, which also included Arnado and Dumlao, in the charges filed by the DOJ before the Manila Regional Trial Court in May. Nemeno surrendered to the PNP a day before the trial court, on May 28, issued arrest warrants against the twenty-two; while Dumlao was arrested a week later.

In August, the trial court ordered the release of one of them, mistakenly identified as a suspect, from detention. In November, the case was transferred to Manila RTC Branch 18 from Branch 41 after the inhibition of the latter's judge.

In a petition granted by the Court of Appeals in April 2002, P/Supt. Michael Ray Aquino, chief of operations of PAOCTF, P/Supt. Cezar Mancao II, and P/Sr. Supt. Teofilo Viña, chief of PAOCTF–Visayas, as well as another police officer, were charged as additional accused; Lopez brothers and Diloy were discharged, excluding Dumlao, to become state witnesses. Three former police generals were also included through a petition granted by the CA.

Aquino, Dumlao, and Mancao were aides of then PAOCTF head Lacson.

In 2006, the Manila RTC, finding probable cause to prosecute Mancao, Aquino and 18 others for the murders, ordered the arrest of the two.

The three had fled to the United States but were later extradited upon request by the Philippine government. Mancao and Dumlao (for his second time) were arrested there in 2008. Meanwhile, Aquino, arrested in 2005 due to an unrelated espionage case, was extradited in 2011.

Mancao later agreed to turn state witness, but in 2011, the CA declared him unfit to serve as such, citing mistakes in his affidavits. He was subsequently removed from the Witness Protection Program. He escaped from the custody of the NBI in 2013; he surrendered to the police in 2017. He was acquitted later that year.

Estrada and Lacson had been cleared of their involvement. Dumlao turned state witness in 2009 and was dropped from the list of the accused; the case against Aquino was dismissed by the Manila RTC in 2012.

In January 2023, two of the suspects were arrested through warrants issued in 2001 by Manila RTC Branch 41: former SPO1 William Reed III in Pulilan, Bulacan and, nine days later, former SPO1 Rolando Lacasandile in Quezon City.

=== Conviction ===
In September 2017, Manila RTC Branch 18, while acquitting Mancao and Soberano for lack of evidence, convicted former SPO3 Mauro Torres, sentencing him to life imprisonment without eligibility of a parole. Torres had admitted being the one who strangled the victims.

=== United States court ruling ===
In January 2014, a district court in North Carolina, United States ordered former P/Supt. Aquino to pay Dacer's daughters $4.2 million in damages. The daughters used the Torture Victim Protection Act, allowing US courts to hear human rights abuse cases committed outside the said country.

== Aftermath ==
The Presidential Anti-Organized Crime Task Force, a special police unit, was created by President Estrada through Executive Order No. 8 in the beginning of his term, taking over from the defunct Presidential Anti-Crime Commission which Estrada had headed while being the Vice President. Due to the implication of its members in the case, as well as in other crimes, his successor Gloria Macapagal Arroyo ordered to abolish the task force in 2001. Since then, no actions had been taken against its members.

By 2009, at least three of the respondents in the case are already dead. Viña was shot to death in Tanza, Cavite in 2003. Jimmy Lopez met the same fate in Trece Martires City in 2009.

Mancao was appointed as chief of the Department of Information and Communications Technology–Cybercrime Investigation and Coordination Center in 2020.

Dumlao was reinstated to the PNP in 2012 and became the police's anti-kidnapping chief four years later.

Aquino, by 2022, is working with businessman Ricky Razon.

== In popular culture ==
The case was featured on the tenth episode of television program Case Unclosed, aired on GMA Network in 2008.

== See also ==
- List of kidnappings
- List of unsolved murders (2000–present)
