= Cherry Hills subdivision landslide =

1999 landslide in Rizal, Philippines

- Date: August 3, 1999
- Time: 20:00 PST/UTC+08:00
- Location: Antipolo, Rizal, Philippines; 14°37′01.45″N 121°11′45.78″E
- Deaths: 58
- Missing: 1

On the night of August 3, 1999, a massive landslide occurred in Cherry Hills subdivision in Antipolo, Rizal, Philippines that resulted to about 60 deaths and 378 houses buried. The landslide was primarily caused by the heavy rains associated with Typhoon Ising (Olga) and neglect by the developers and government officials in assessing the site's vulnerability to geohazards.

== Background ==
Cherry Hills subdivision was home to hundreds of families paying-off low cost, concrete houses. The subdivision was owned and developed by Tirso Santillan, president of Philippine-Japan Solidarity (Philjas) Corporation, which had previously been given a contract by the Housing and Land Use Regulatory Board (HLURB) to develop the area by 1992 but was given an extension of up to March 1999 due to delays. Following complaints by lot buyers, an inspection by the HLURB had previously found that Philjas failed to follow the plan in its contract, including amenities such as landscaping, entrance gate and water tanks.

== Topography ==
The subdivision was located in Antipolo, Rizal and was situated in an elevated terrain cut along the perches of the Sierra Madre mountains. It was also flanked by two subdivisions on its sides. The eastern summit was at elevation of 255 meters while the western side was at elevation of 233 meters. The subdivision cut from the mountain side was approximately 26 meters at its deepest.

The subdivision encompassed five hectares with paved roads. The subdivision consisted of light-roofed one or two-storey houses with hollow block wall construction that are either single-detached or row houses.

== Event ==
Before the landslide, several residents started evacuating the area when cracks began manifesting on the walls of their houses. Tell-tale signs about a possible impending slide was rumored, and ominous signs of changes in elevation and ground movements were observed. Three days before the landslide, rainfall measurements totaled 523.3 millimeters, equivalent to 120 days of normal rainfall during the rainy season, and was reported to have broken a 35-year record. This was primarily due to the onslaught of Typhoon Ising (Olga) and its enhancement of the southwest monsoon.

On August 3, 1999, the landslide occurred as other residents were preparing to evacuate due to heavy rain, trapping them inside their homes as uphill houses and 45,000 cubic meters of mud, rocks, and concrete buried low-lying areas. At least 58 people died, while 300 homes were destroyed and 378 families were left homeless.

== Investigation ==
Philjas claimed that the landslide was trigged by excess rainwater that had seeped into Hill 255 and was aggravated by ground fissures caused by renovations done by residents, who in turn accused Philjas of using substandard materials. However, Philjas officials later acknowledged that quarrying by the company on a mountain that left a 20-foot high hanging wall made the site unstable and that they had failed to present a geohazard assessment before commencing construction. It was also later found that the subdivision was built on a 27% slope rather than the 15% claimed that Philjas.

A study by geologists at the University of the Philippines also attributed the cause to the geological setting of the area, noting that its soil was oversaturated with water as it consisted of alternating porous and impervious rocks as well as a significant amount of clays "of probably the swelling type." They also cited the natural slope of the ground, sparse vegetation, and pre-existing fractures in the bedrock, and concluded that a geological survey could have avoided the event, which geologists said was probably not conducted to save on construction costs. A further inspection by the Mines and Geosciences Bureau found that the site also did not have a proper drainage system and was vulnerable to ground slippage because of the dangerous slope to its west.

An investigation by the Philippine Senate concluded that the disaster was not caused by force majeure, but occurred as a result of the negligence of Philjas and government agencies, which failed to enforce rules on the construction of low–cost housing. Among those named in its report were the HLURB and the Antipolo city government.

== Aftermath ==
In December 1999, the Office of the Ombudsman recommended the dismissal of five housing and environment officials for "gross neglect" and the suspension of 13 other housing, environment and city officials in relation to the disaster.

In 2001, a court ordered the arrest of Philjas president Santillan, his general manager Hiroshi Ogawa, and assistant general manager Eleazar Rodriguez. The charges were dismissed by the Antipolo prosecutor's office before it was reopened by the Justice Department in 2002. In 2004, Santillan and Rodriguez pleaded not guilty to charges of reckless imprudence, while Ogawa went into hiding, followed later by Rodriguez. As of 2011, the case had not yet been resolved.

In 2002, the HLURB ordered Philjas to pay damages estimated at P89 million and return payments previously made by the residents. Philjas then gave each family P15,000, and another P10,000 to those who lost a member.

The disaster led the Department of Environment and Natural Resources to issue an administrative order in 2000 requiring developers of housing projects and other infrastructure projects to conduct a geohazard assessment before they are issued a license.

The unaffected parts of the subdivision continue to be an inhabited residential area.

== In popular culture ==
The incident was featured in a 2009 episode of Case Unclosed, an incident-crime documentary show from GMA Network.
