= Mancao =

1993 Filipino film

- Official movie poster
- Directed by: Felix E. Dalay
- Written by: Humilde "Meek" Roxas; Jojo Lapus
- Produced by: Lily Y. Monteverde; Victor Villegas
- Starring: Phillip Salvador
- Cinematography: Ver Dauz
- Edited by: Renato de Leon
- Music by: Mon del Rosario
- Production companies: Regal Films; Moviestars Production
- Distributed by: Regal Films
- Release date: December 2, 1993
- Running time: 108 minutes
- Country: Philippines
- Language: Filipino

Mancao is a 1993 Philippine biographical action film directed by Felix E. Dalay. The film stars Phillip Salvador in the title role. The film is based on the life of former policeman Cezar Mancao and his encounter with Red Scorpion Gang leader Joey de Leon.

The film is streaming online on YouTube.

== Cast ==
- Phillip Salvador as Captain Cezar Mancao
- Gabby Concepcion as Joey de Leon
- Snooky Serna as Maricar Mancao
- Edgar Mortiz as Boggart
- Ramon Christopher as Bimbo
- Jon Hernandez as Marcelo
- Amado Cortez as Mancao's Father
- Luz Valdez as Mancao's Mother
- Roberto Pagdanganan as himself
- Vicente Vinarao as himself
- Pantaleon Dumlao as himself
- Everlino Nartates as himself
- Lito Legaspi as Mayor
- Zandro Zamora as Lt. Vargas
- Romy Diaz as Ka George
- Roldan Aquino as Atty. Andaya
- Edwin Reyes as Bert
- Honey Policarpio as Ninfa

== Production ==
The film was planned to be about Red Scorpion Gang leader Joey de Leon with Phillip Salvador portraying his role. However, it was scrapped due to public demand and replaced with a biographical film about Cezar Mancao, portrayed by Salvador, and his encounter with de Leon.
