= Typhoon Olga (1999) =

Pacific typhoon in 1999

Typhoon Olga (Ising)
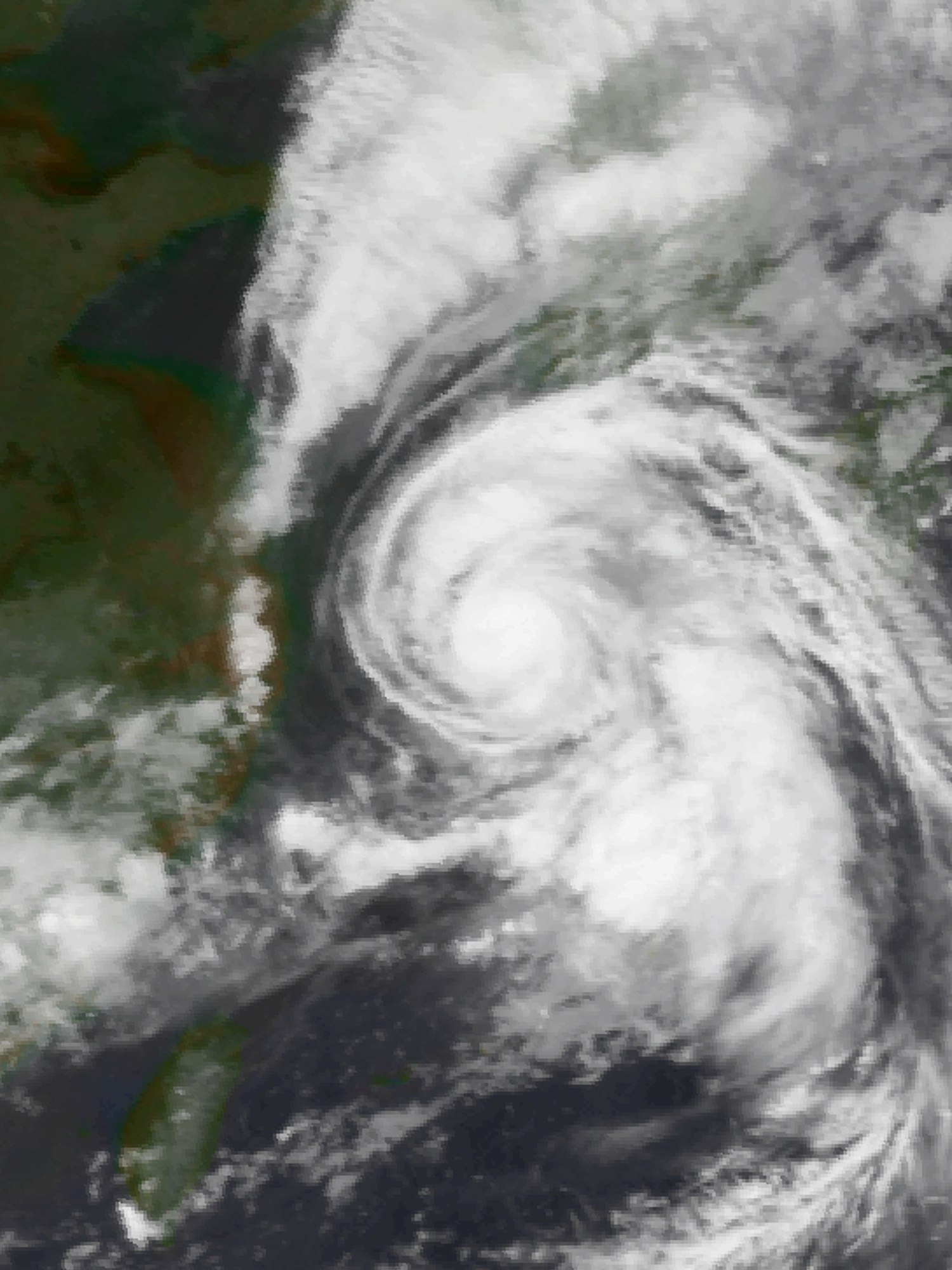
- Typhoon Olga at peak intensity on August 2

Meteorological history
- Formed: July 29, 1999
- Extratropical: August 3, 1999
- Dissipated: August 5, 1999

Typhoon
- 10-minute sustained (JMA)
- Highest winds: 120 km/h (75 mph)
- Lowest pressure: 970 hPa (mbar); 28.64 inHg

Category 1-equivalent tropical cyclone
- 1-minute sustained (SSHWS/JTWC)
- Highest winds: 150 km/h (90 mph)

Overall effects
- Fatalities: 266 total
- Damage: $657 million
- Areas affected: Caroline Islands; Philippines; Ryukyu Islands; Korea
- Part of the 1999 Pacific typhoon season

Typhoon Olga, also known in the Philippines as Typhoon Ising, was a destructive and deadly typhoon that hit Korean Peninsula in 1999. Olga killed 106 people in Korea and caused $657 million in damages.

== Meteorological history ==
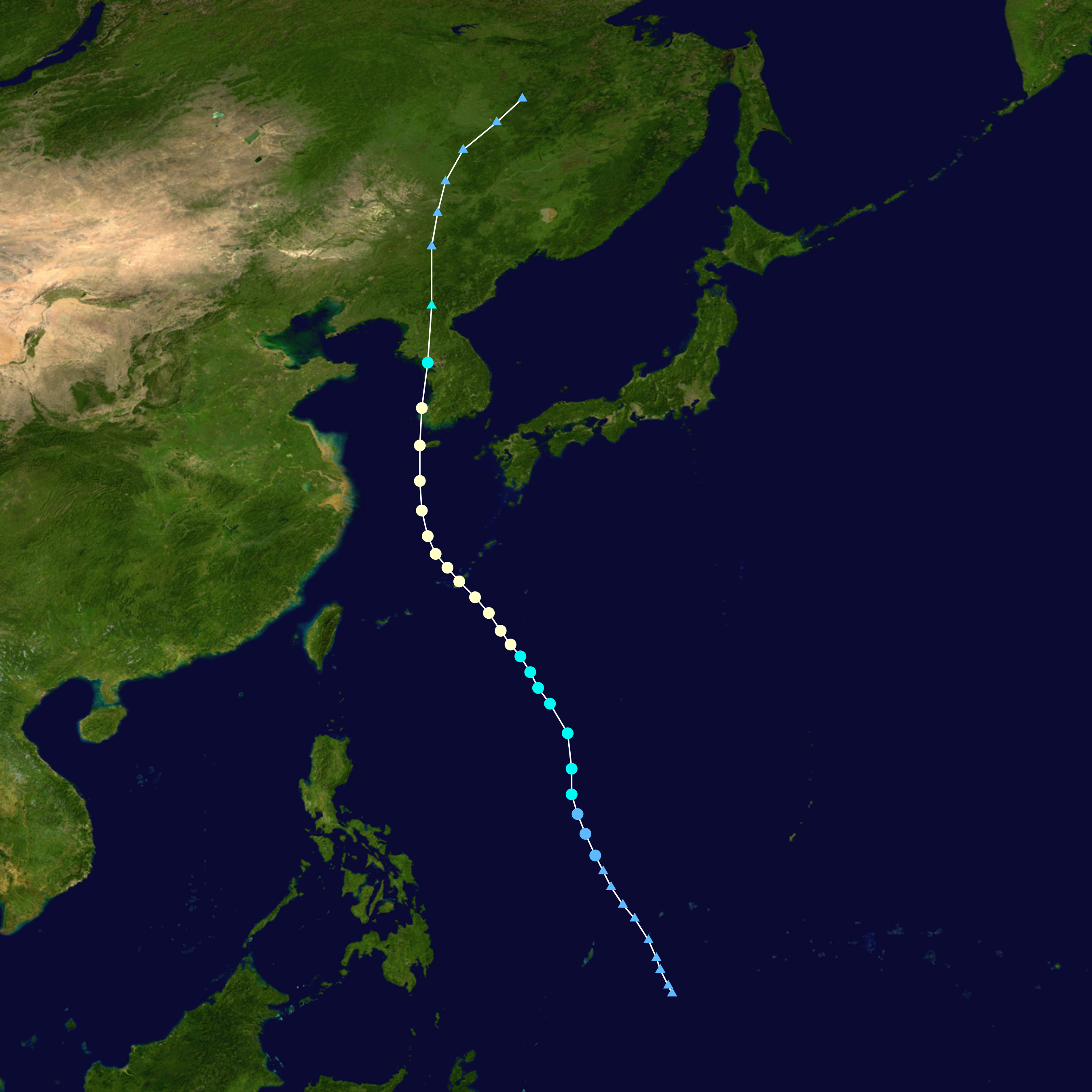
Map plotting the storm's track and intensity, according to the Saffir–Simpson scale Map key Saffir–Simpson scale Tropical depression (≤38 mph, ≤62 km/h) Tropical storm (39–73 mph, 63–118 km/h) Category 1 (74–95 mph, 119–153 km/h) Category 2 (96–110 mph, 154–177 km/h) Category 3 (111–129 mph, 178–208 km/h) Category 4 (130–156 mph, 209–251 km/h) Category 5 (≥157 mph, ≥252 km/h) Unknown Storm type Tropical cyclone Subtropical cyclone Extratropical cyclone, remnant low, tropical disturbance, or monsoon depression

On July 26, a disturbance began to develop at the eastern end of a well-defined monsoon trough well to the east of the Philippines. The convection within the disturbance increased as it moved to the north and Tropical Depression 11W formed on July 29. The system continued to intensify, becoming Typhoon Olga two days later as it approached Okinawa Island. On August 1, Olga made landfall on the Japanese island as a typhoon, weakening slightly as it passed over the island. As it moved to the north-northwest it intensified to its peak with 150 km/h (93 mph) winds as it approached Korea. The storm was beginning to weaken as it passed to the west of Cheju Island on August 3 and it made a second brief landfall on the T'aean Peninsula before moving north in the Yellow Sea. The storm made its final landfall in North Korea as a strong tropical storm later that day with 100 km/h (62 mph) winds and became extratropical soon after. Both the JMA and PAGASA considered Olga a typhoon, with PAGASA naming the storm Ising before the JTWC issued its first warning on the developing system.

== Impact ==
Although Typhoon Olga never approached the Philippines closely, it was responsible for heavy rains over much of Luzon that displaced 80,000 and killed 160 people, 60 of which coming from a landslide that occurred in Antipolo, a suburban city outside Metro Manila. Olga passed over Okinawa, with winds of 80 km/h (50 mph) recorded at Kadena Air Base, causing minimal damage. Torrential rain of up to 600 mm (24 in) fell on the Korean Peninsula, with the highest totals falling near the border between North and South Korea. The resulting floods and landslides caused 64 fatalities in South Korea and wind gusts of 96 km/h (60 mph) were reported near Seoul. The flooding in South Korea destroyed about 400 km^{2} (150 sq mi) of rice paddies and 8,500 homes, leaving 25,000 people homeless. The Red Cross reported a further 42 deaths and 40,000 were made homeless from flooding in North Korea. That same flooding worsened the ongoing food shortages across the country. Typhoon Olga brought the heaviest rains recorded in Korea for 25 years and caused a total of $657 million of damage in South Korea.

== See also ==
- Other storms of the same name
- 1999 Pacific typhoon season
- Typhoon Haikui (2012) – another typhoon which indirectly affected the Philippines by enhancing the monsoon and caused widespread flooding.
- Typhoon Gaemi (2024) – another typhoon that also never impacted the Philippines but caused widespread intense rains due to the enhancement of southwest monsoon.
- Typhoon Yagi (2024) – another typhoon which affected the Philippines and caused widespread flooding in Luzon areas and massive landslide in Rizal province.
