= Case Unclosed =

Philippine television documentary show

- Title card
- Genre: Documentary
- Presented by: Kara David; Arnold Clavio
- Country of origin: Philippines
- Original language: Tagalog
- No. of episodes: 70 (list of episodes)

Production
- Running time: 19–32 minutes
- Production company: GMA News and Public Affairs

Original release
- Network: GMA Network
- Release: October 2, 2008 – February 25, 2010

Case Unclosed is a Philippine television documentary show broadcast by GMA Network. Originally hosted by Kara David, it premiered on October 2, 2008. Arnold Clavio served as the final host. The show concluded on February 25, 2010, with a total of 70 episodes.

The show is streaming online on YouTube.

== Hosts ==
- Kara David
- Arnold Clavio

== Accolades ==
Accolades received by Case Unclosed
| Year | Award | Category | Recipient | Result | Ref. |
|---|---|---|---|---|---|
| 2009 | Public Attorney's Office Awards | Best Public Affairs show | Case Unclosed | Won | |
| 2009 | Volunteers Against Crime and Corruption | Outstanding TV Program | Case Unclosed | Won | |
