= Cezar Mancao =

Filipino former police officer

- Born: Cezar Ochoco Mancao
- Political party: MAYPAGASA (2019); Aksyon Demokratiko (2010)
- Police career
- Service: Philippine National Police
- Divisions: Presidential Anti-Organized Crime Task Force (PAOCTF)
- Service years: 1986–2003
- Rank: Police Senior Superintendent

Cezar Ochoco Mancao II (sometimes misspelled as Cesar Ochoco Mancao II) is a former Filipino police officer.

== Police career ==
Graduate of PMA class of 1986, when in his early years as police officer, he faced the Red Scorpion Gang leader Alfredo "Joey" de Leon.

He was formerly known as one of Panfilo Lacson's deputy chief of operations of Presidential Anti-Organized Crime Task Force (PAOCTF) and Task Force Habagat.

== Dacer-Corbito case ==
=== Conviction ===
==== Early in 2002 to 2010 ====
In 2002, Chief Superintendent Glenn Dumlao said that he, Mancao, and Senior Superintendent Michael Ray Aquino were the top architects and executioners of murdering Buddy Dacer. In a petition granted by the Court of Appeals (CA) in April 2002, he with Aquino, then-chief of operations of PAOCTF, and P/Sr. Supt. Teofilo Viña, chief of PAOCTF–Visayas, as well as another police officers, were charged as additional accused. Mancao and Aquino escaped the country by August 2001, thus declared as officers in AWOL.

In 2006, the Manila RTC, finding probable cause to prosecute he, Aquino and 18 others for the murders, ordered the arrest of the two. Mancao was arrested in 2008 in the United States while working as a real estate agent. Mancao's lawyer was Ferdinand Topacio.

Mancao later agreed to turn state witness and pointed his former superior Lacson and President Joseph Estrada as the primary suspects, as Mancao said that they are ordered on an "Operation Delta" that designed to kill Dacer. Lacson believes that Mancao was used by Gloria Macapagal Arroyo, then-President who is criticized by Lacson. That is also caused for Lacson to escape abroad.

But in 2011, the CA declared him unfit to serve as such, citing mistakes in his affidavits. He was subsequently removed from the Witness Protection Program. He escaped from the custody of the NBI in 2013; he surrendered to the police in 2017. He was acquitted later that year.

==== United States court ruling ====
In a petition granted by the Court of Appeals in April 2002, he was included as additional accused, with PS/Supt. Michael Ray Aquino, and P/Sr. Supt. Teofilo Viña, chief of PAOCTF–Visayas, as well as another police officers.

In January 2014, a district court in North Carolina, United States was ordered him with former P/Supt. Aquino to pay Dacer's daughters $4.2 million in damages. The daughters used the Torture Victim Protection Act, allowing US courts to hear human rights abuse cases committed outside the said country.

== Political life ==
Mancao run for congressman of the 1st District of Compostela Valley in the 2010 polls, but lost. He later run for a party-list spot within the banner of Kilusang MAYPAGASA with the initiative of police officer's welfare, and peace and order, but lost again.

He was named head of DICT’s cybercrime center with the rank of Executive Director V.

== Popular culture ==
Mancao was featured in 1993 film Mancao starring Philip Salvador that features his encounter the syndicate Red Scorpion Gang leader Joey de Leon.
