= Michael Ray Aquino =

Filipino former police officer

- Police career
- Service: Philippine National Police
- Divisions: Presidential Anti-Organized Crime Task Force (PAOCTF)
- Rank: Police Senior Superintendent

Michael Ray Aquino is a former intelligence officer in the police force of the Philippines.

== Police career ==
He was formerly known as one of Panfilo Lacson's deputy chief of operations of Presidential Anti-Organized Crime Task Force (PAOCTF), and Task Force Habagat. In 2001, Aquino went on the run in the United States of America after he was accused of involvement in the Dacer–Corbito double murder case. He was eventually extradited to the Philippines in 2011, however all charges were dismissed in by the Manila RTC in 2012.

== Executive career ==
Aquino, by 2022, is working with businessman Ricky Razon. Aquino was notable for roles as VP for Solaire Resort and later for Apex Mining directorship.

== Conviction ==
=== Information leaking ===
He was convicted of helping to transmit classified information stolen from U.S. Vice President Dick Cheney's office to opposition leaders in the Philippines. Aquino faced a jail sentence of between 70 and 87 months plus a $250,000 fine. On July 17, 2007, he was sentenced to six years and four months in prison by U.S. District Judge William H. Walls.

=== United States court ruling (Dacer-Corbito) ===
In a petition granted by the Court of Appeals in April 2002, he was included as additional accused, with P/Supt. Cezar Mancao II, and P/Sr. Supt. Teofilo Viña, chief of PAOCTF–Visayas, as well as another police officers.

In January 2014, a district court in North Carolina, United States ordered former P/Supt. Aquino to pay the daughters of Salvador Dacer $4.2 million in damages. The daughters used the Torture Victim Protection Act, allowing US courts to hear human rights abuse cases committed outside the said country.
